= List of governors of Kasaï (former province) =

Belgian Congo provinces in 1920

Belgian Congo provinces in 1933 after Léopoldville and Lusambo (Kasaï) had been separated

The present Kasaï Province created in 2015 when Kasai-Occidental was partitioned

This list of governors of Kasaï includes governors or equivalent officeholders of the Congo-Kasaï/Kongo-Kasaï province established in the Belgian Congo in 1918. On 1 October 1933 it was split into the Lusambo and Léopoldville provinces. Lusambo included the Kasaï and Sankuru districts of Congo-Kasaï and parts of the Léopold II District (Équateur) and Lomami District (Katanga). On 27 May 1947 Lusambo was renamed Kasaï, which became an autonomous province of the Congo republic on 30 June 1960.

On 14 August 1962 Kasaï was divided into five new provinces: Lomami, Luluabourg, Sankuru, Sud-Kasaï and Unité Kasaïenne. On 25 April 1966 Luluabourg and Unité Kasaïenne were united to form Kasaï-Occidental, while Lomami, Sankuru, and Sud-Kasaï were united in the new province of Kasaï-Oriental. Kasaï-Occidental was split in 2015 into the Kasaï-Central and Kasaï provinces.

== Congo-Kasaï (1922–1932) ==
The governors (or equivalent) of Congo-Kasaï Province were:

| Start | End | Officeholder | Title |
|---|---|---|---|
| 18 October 1918 | 1922 | Léon Guilain Bureau (1869–1944) | Deputy governor-general |
| 1922 | 1925 | Alphonse Engels (1880–1962) | Deputy governor-general |
| 1925 | 19 June 1929 | Alphonse Engels (1880–1962 | Governor and deputy governor-general |
| 19 June 1929 | 5 January 1932 | Joseph Beernaert (1883–1950) | Governor and deputy governor-general |
| 17 August 1932 | 30 September 1933 | Paul Ermens (1884–1957) | Governor and deputy governor-general |

== Lusambo (1933–1947) ==
The governors (or equivalent) of Lusambo Province were:

| Start | End | Officeholder | Title |
|---|---|---|---|
| 1 October 1933 | 17 August 1940 | Constant Wauters | Commissioner |
| 11 September 1940 | 1941 | François Wenner | Commissioner |
| 1941 | 9 June 1944 | François Wenner | Governor |
| July 1944 | 1945 | Albert-Émile de Beauffort | Governor |
| 7 February 1945 | 21 September 1945 | René P. Preys | Governor |
| 21 September 1945 | 1947 | Léon A. Hofkens | Governor |

== Kasaï (1947–1962) ==
The governors (or equivalent) of Kasaï Province were:

| Start | End | Officeholder | Title |
|---|---|---|---|
| 1947 | 19 July 1948 | Léon A. Hofkens | Governor |
| 19 July 1948 | 11 April 1952 | Firmin Peigneux | Governor |
| 11 April 1952 | 27 March 1955 | Roger Le Bussy | Governor |
| 20 April 1955 | 27 September 1955 | Jean Paelinck (1906–1961) | Governor |
| 1 October 1955 | 22 June 1958 | Antoine Lamborelle | Governor |
| 1 July 1958 | 1960 | Louis De Jaegher (1908–1973) | Governor |
| 1960 | 31 May 1960 | L. Henrotaux | Governor (acting) |
| 31 May 1960 | 30 June 1960 | Marcel Matterne | General Extraordinary Commissioner |
| 30 June 1960 | December 1961 | Barthélemy Mukenge (1925–2018) | President (1st time) |
| January 1962 | May 1962 | André Lubaya (d. 1968) | President |
| 9 June 1962 | 14 August 1962 | Barthélemy Mukenge | President (2nd time) |

== See also ==
- List of governors of Kasaï-Occidental
- List of governors of Kasaï Oriental Province
- Lists of provincial governors of the Democratic Republic of the Congo
