= List of governors of Kasaï-Occidental =

Kasai-Occidental

This list of governors of Kasaï-Occidental includes governors or equivalent officer holders of the Kasaï-Occidental province created in the Republic of the Congo in 1966 by combining the provinces of Luluabourg and Unité Kasaïenne, which became the districts of Lulua District and Kasaï District. It also includes governors of the preceding provinces. In 2015 the province was split into the Kasaï-Central and Kasaï provinces.

== Luluabourg Province governors ==
The governors (or equivalent) of Luluabourg Province were:

Start	End	Officeholder	Title
September 1962	September 1963	François Luakabwanga (1st time)	President
September 1963	25 September 1964	André Lubaya (d. 1968)	President
25 September 1964	December 1965	François Luakabwanga (2nd time)	President, then from 1965 Governor
January 1966	18 April 1966	Constantin Tshilumba	Governor
18 April 1966	25 April 1966	François Luakabwanga (3rd time)	Governor

== Unité Kasaïenne governors ==
The governors (or equivalent) of Unité Kasaïenne were:

Start	End	Officeholder	Title
September 1962	December 1963	Grégoire Kamanga	President
January 1964	December 1965	François Minga Mbengele	President, then from 1965 Governor
January 1966	25 April 1966	Robert William Mbombo	Governor

== Kasaï-Occidental governors ==
The governors (or equivalent) of Kasaï-Occidental were:

Start	End	Officeholder	Title
25 April 1966	3 January 1967	François Luakabwanga	Governor
3 January 1967	9 August 1968	Paul Muhona	Governor
9 August 1968	23 December 1970	André William Ntikala	Governor
23 December 1970	24 February 1972	Daniel Monguya Mbenge	Governor
24 February 1972	19 March 1974	Henri-Désiré Takizala (1936–2000)	Commissioner
19 March 1974	10 February 1976	Ngoma Ntoto Bwangi	Commissioner
10 February 1976	20 October 1976	Ndebo-a-Kanda-di-Ne Kenza	Commissioner
7 May 1977	21 January 1978	Mpika Masamba Ngolomiso	Commissioner
21 January 1978	18 January 1980	Konde Vila Kikanda	Commissioner
18 January 1980	27 August 1980	Kamakanda N'koma	Commissioner
27 August 1980	19 March 1983	Kyembwa wa Lumona	Governor
19 March 1983	1 January 1985	Zamundu Agenong'Ka	Governor
1 January 1985	1986*	Bangala Basila (b. 1943)	Governor
20 July 1988	19..	Bomandeke Bonyeka (b. 1937)	Governor
19..	19..	Mpambia Musanga Bekaja (b. 1935)	Governor
19..	19..	Janvier Tshibuabua Kapya (b. c.1953)	Governor
*Oct 1997	1999	Pascal Tshitoka Ngalamulume	Governor
1999	April 2006	Claudel Lubaya	Governor
April 2006	16 October 2006	Gilbert Tshiongo Tshibinkubuka wa Tumba	Governor
16 October 2006	16 March 2007	Mutombo Bakafwa Nsenda	Governor
16 March 2007	2 March 2011	Trésor Kapuku Ngoy	Governor
June 2007	August 2007	Hubert Mbingho	Governor (acting)
2 March 2011	18 April 2011	Hubert Mbingho	Governor (acting)
18 April 2011	6 June 2012	Hubert Kabasubabo (b. 1961)	Governor
6 June 2012	9 February 2013	Jean Mwamba	Governor (acting)
9 February 2013	29 October 2015	Alex Kande Mupompa (b. 1950)	Governor

== See also ==
- List of governors of Kasaï (former province)
- Lists of provincial governors of the Democratic Republic of the Congo
