= Lulua =

Lulua may refer to:

- Lulua (beetle), a genus of beetles in the subfamily Prioninae
- Lulua River
- Lulua District
- Lulua Province (proposed)
- Lulua Province (former)
- Lulua Mosque, Egypt
- Lulua people
