= History of the Kasai region =

This is a history of the Kasai region in the Democratic Republic of Congo and of the political divisions which have occupied it since human settlement began.

== Earliest residence ==
Not much is known of pre-Bantu residence in the region, although it is likely that Pygmies once dwelled in Kasai.

== Belgian rule ==
Belgian rule in Kasai, post-Leopold, eventually saw the consolidation of the region as a single political unit. In 1919, Bas-Congo, Moyen-Congo, Kasaï, Kwango and Sankuru districts (out of 22 districts created in the Belgian Congo) were merged into Congo Kasai, one of four provinces created that year. In 1933 Kasaï and Sankuru (the two eastern districts of the former vice government general of Congo-Kasaï) and parts of the districts of Léopold II (in Equateur) and Lomami (in Katanga) were separated to form the new Congolese province of Lusambo (after 1947, Kasai); in turn, Bas-Congo, Kwango, Léopoldville and the major part of Lake Léopold II became the new province of Léopoldville.

In 1957, the capital of Kasai was moved from Lusambo to Luluabourg.

== End of Belgian rule ==
In 1960, the Democratic Republic of the Congo declared independence from Belgium. However, it was beset by a number of secessions and bitter civil war.

== Secession of South Kasai ==
The South Kasai region sought independence in similar circumstances to neighboring Katanga during the Congo Crisis. Ethnic conflicts and political tensions between leaders of the central government and local leaders plagued the diamond-rich region. On 14 June 1960, days before the colony was to become independent, officials declared the independence of Kasai (not of Congo) and proclaimed the Federal State of South Kasai. On 8 August 1960, the autonomous Mining State of South Kasai was proclaimed with its capital at Bakwanga. Albert Kalonji was named president of South Kasai and Joseph Ngalula was appointed head of government. Lumumba was determined to quickly subdue the renegade provinces of Kasai and Katanga. Dissatisfied with the UN, Lumumba followed through on his threat to request military assistance from the Soviet Union, who responded with an airlift of Congolese troops to invade Kasai. A bloody campaign ensued causing the deaths of hundreds of Baluba tribesmen and the flight of a quarter of a million refugees. Lumumba's decision to accept Soviet help angered the US, who via the CIA increasingly supported Mobutu and Kasa-Vubu.

=== Congolese forces re-conquer South Kasai ===
On December 30, 1961, after a four-month military campaign, troops of the Congolese central government re-conquered South Kasai and arrested Kalonji, thus ending the South Kasai secession.

== Post civil war ==
Under the subsequent regime of Joseph Mobutu (Mobutu Sese Seko), the former South Kasai was divided to discourage separatist sentiment or activity; most of the territory was allocated to Kasai-Oriental, while the rest of the historic Kasai region was renamed Kasai-Occidental.

== Post Mobutu ==
In 2006, the new Constitution re-divided the region into five new provinces:

- Kasai oriental
- Lomami
- Sankuru
- Kasai
- Lulua

In 2007, two cases of the Ebola haemorrhagic fever were announced in the region.
