= Louis De Jaegher =

Belgian colonial administrator

Governors of Kasaï
- In office 1 July 1958 – 17 February 1960
- Preceded by: Antoine Lamborelle
- Succeeded by: L. Henrotaux (acting)

Personal details
- Born: 30 July 1908 Nieuwpoort, Belgium
- Died: 22 February 1973 (aged 64) Ixelles, Belgium
- Occupation: Colonial administrator

Louis de Jaegher (30 July 1908 – 22 February 1973) was a Belgian colonial administrator. He was governor of Kasaï Province in the Belgian Congo from 1958 to 1960, just before the country became independent as the Republic of the Congo (Léopoldville).

== Early years (1908–1930) ==
Louis Auguste Jules Frans De Jaegher was born in Nieuwpoort, Belgium, on 30 July 1908. His parents were François Joseph Jules Marie de Jaegher and Juliette Louise Marie Paul. He married Cécile Dutrieu. He studied the humanities at the Royal Atheneum in Antwerp. In October 1926 he was admitted to the Colonial University of Belgium, graduating in July 1930.

== Territorial administrator (1930–1946) ==
On 1 September 1930 De Jaegher was appointed territorial administrator 2nd class. He reached Boma on 26 September 1930. He was assigned for his internship to Baseka Bongwalanga Territory in Lulonga District, Équateur Province. In August 1931 he was appointed head of the Ekota Bosaka Territory in Équateur District. In June 1932 he transferred to the Bakutu Bosaka Territory in Tshuapa District. He left Boma on leave on 6 October 1933, and returned on 23 March 1934. His second term was spent in the territories of Ekota Bakutu and Boende in Tshuapa District.

De Jaegher left on leave from 23 April to 8 October 1937, then returned to Boende Territory in Tshuapa District. In addition to his functions as territorial administrator he was deputy judge of the district court and auxiliary judge at the Court of First Instance in Coquilhatville. During World War II (1939–1945) Belgium was invaded on 10 May 1940. Between then and 20 April 1947 De Jaegher took only three short leaves totalling nine months, two in South Africa and one in Kivu. On 1 July 1942 De Jaegher was promoted to senior territorial administrator. He was assigned to the Congo-Ubangi District on 12 June 1944. He was made administrator of Bumba Territory.

== District commissioner (1946–1955) ==
On 12 April 1946 De Jaegher turned to Tshuapa as intern for the grade of district commissioner, and on 20 March 1947 his internship ended and he became district commissioner of Tshuapa. On 20 April 1947 he flew to Belgium for leave. He married on 12 July 1947, and left for the Congo with his wife on 17 January 1948. He was temporarily appointed assistant to the commissioner of the Congo-Ubangi District, then on 15 April moved to Equateur District to assume his duties in Coquilhatville, where his daughter Suzanne was born. De Jaegher left with his family for Antwerp on 23 October 1951, returning on 8 November 1951. This term he was assigned to the Tanganika and Lualaba districts of Katanga Province. On 1 July 1951 he was confirmed as District Commissioner, and on 15 March 1952 was assigned to the Sankuru District in Kasai Province. He went on leave on 13 February 1955.

== Provincial commissioner / governor (1955–1960) ==
On 1 July 1955 De Jaegher was appointed provincial commissioner, and reached Luluabourg by air plane on 26 September 1955 with his family. On 14 January 1958 he left for Belgium on leave, returning to Luluabourg on 4 June 1958. The governor, Antoine Lamborelle, retired and De Jaegher was appointed governor of the Province of Kasai on 1 July 1958. On 20 June 1959 the journal KASAI published a letter from chief Kalamba Mangole Sylvestre and Barthélemy Mukenge, president of the Lulua–Frères association. It called on the Belgian government to unite the Lulua in a single kingdom under one chief, and to recognise the property rights of land belonging to the Lulua. It also stated that the Baluba should recognize Lulua rights and submit to Lulua customary authority, or else return to their original lands.

At De Jaegher's request the assistant district commissioner M.A. Dequenne, the first burgomaster M. Hentgen and the Provincial Director of Indigenous Affairs met on 29 June to discuss the Lulua-Baluba conflict and the Lulua claims. A 9-page draft confidential report was completed on 8 July. It was stolen that evening, communicated to activists of the Muluba Solidarity Movement, then put back where it had been found. The report caused outrage among the Baluba. On 9 July a three page letter from Evariste Kalonji and Justin Kasanda violently protesting "the scandalous attitude of the Belgian Colonial Administration" was sent to the presidents of the Belgian Chamber and Senate, with copies to King Baudouin, the Minister of Congo, the Governor General in Kalina and the Governor of the Province of Kasai. On 7 August De Jaegher received a delegation of leaders from Léopoldville, consisting of Patrice Lumumba (Mouvement National Congolais), Bertin-Onésime Tumba (Interfédérale) and Barthélemy Mujanayi (Mouvement solidaire Muluba).

== Last years ==
De Jaegher held office as governor until going on leave on 17 February 1960. He was replaced by L. Henrotaux as acting governor. He died in Ixelles on 22 February 1973. He had been made a member of the Order of Leopold II on 18 April 1949, and an officer of the order on 9 May 1950.

== Sources ==
- Belgium (1950), Belgisch staatsblad
- "Congo (Kinshasa) Provinces", Rulers.org
- "L'affaire Kalonji et les problèmes du Kasai", Courrier Hebdomadaire du CRISP (31): 9–18, 1959, doi:10.3917/cris.031.0009
- Lemborelle, A. (15 May 1976), "JAEGHER (DE)" (PDF), Biographie Belge d'Outre-Mer (in French), vol. VII–C, Académie Royale des Sciences d'Outre-Mer
