= Lulua Province =

Lulua Province may refer to:

- Lulua Province (proposed)
- Lulua Province (former)
