= Kinshasa Central Market =

Coordinates: 4°18′37″S 15°18′45″E

- Zando
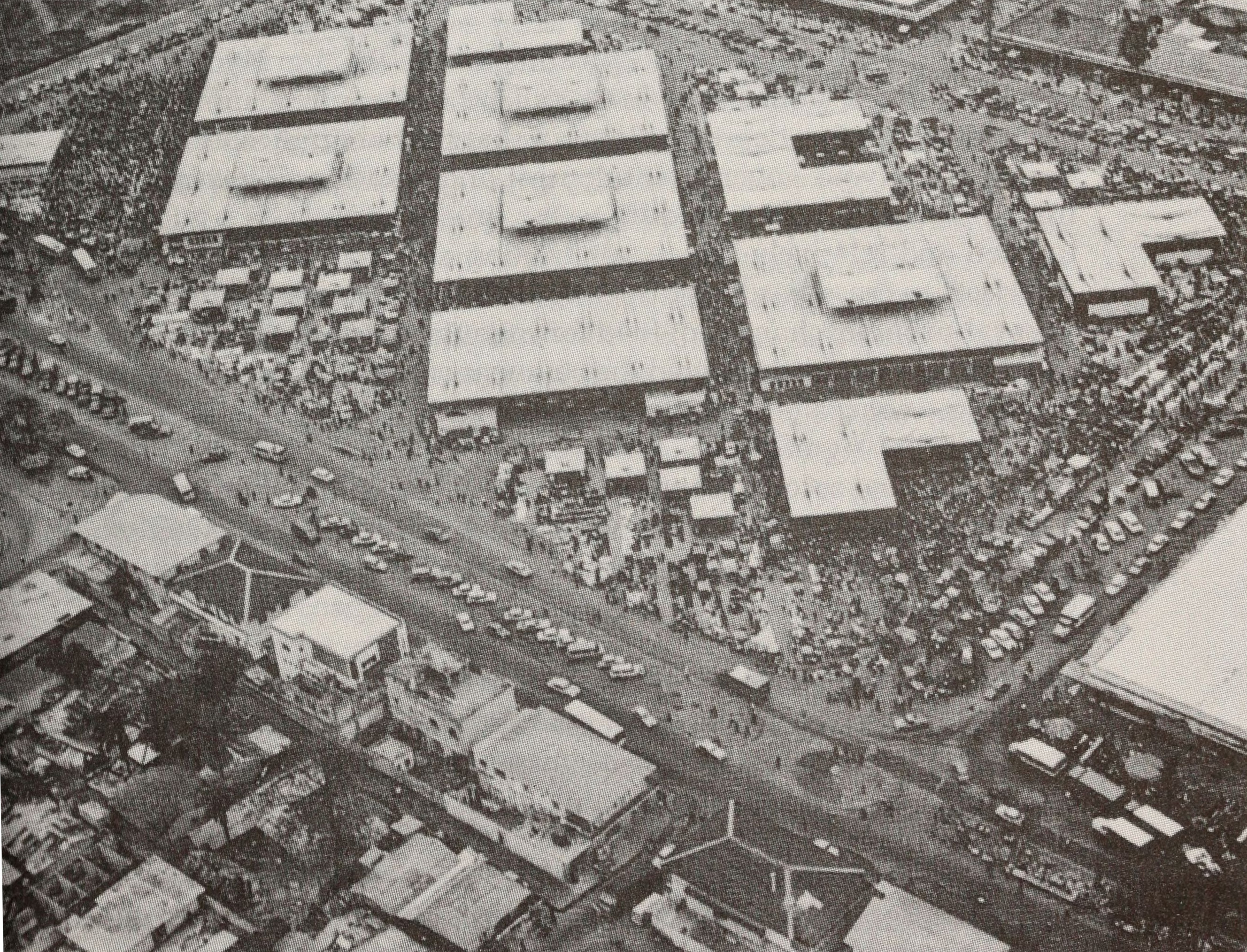
- Kinshasa Central Market during the 1970s in what was then Zaire
- Former names: Marché Publique

General information
- Location: Kinshasa, Democratic Republic of the Congo
- Opened: 1944; 82 years ago

Other information
- Seating capacity: 35,000 vendors

The Kinshasa Central Market (French: Marché Central de Kinshasa, formerly Marché Publique), also known colloquially as Zando ya Monene or Zando in Lingala, is a marketplace located in Kinshasa, Democratic Republic of the Congo. Spanning approximately 72.5 hectares in the city center, it is one of the city's most prominent and historic marketplaces. Its known for its variety of manufactured goods and larger retail outlets.

Initially inaugurated in January 1944 under Belgian colonial rule by Vice Governor General Paul Ermens and District Commissioner Roger Le Bussy, the market underwent significant transformation following Congolese independence, including a complete demolition and reconstruction in 1968, as part of Mobutu Sese Seko's authenticité campaign, which promoted national identity and sought to reduce foreign corporate influence. During Mobutu's presidency, the market was Kinshasa's largest trading center until it was eventually eclipsed by the Marché de la Liberté under President Laurent-Désiré Kabila. As of May 1989, the market accommodated 15,500 vendors. By 2020, that number had risen to 35,000 vendors.

On 20 January 2021, the marketplace was temporarily shut down for rehabilitation work by the provincial Minister of Agriculture, Kanza Ne Kongo, who represent Governor Gentiny Ngobila Mbaka.

== Geography ==
=== Location and environment ===
The Kinshasa Central Market spans approximately 72.5 hectares in the heart of Kinshasa. It is strategically situated in a densely populated urban area and is bordered by multiple neighborhoods (quartiers) and communes. To the north, it adjoins the Révolution and Commerce neighborhoods along Commerce Avenue in the Gombe commune; to the south, it borders the Madimba and Bitshiaku-Tshiaku neighborhoods along Kilosa Avenue in the communes of Kinshasa and Barumbu. The eastern boundary runs along Kasaï Avenue, adjacent to the Bitshiaku-Tshiaku and Commerce neighborhoods in Barumbu and Gombe, while to the west, it is bounded by the Ngbaka and Golf neighborhoods along Kasa-Vubu Avenue, within the communes of Kinshasa and Gombe.

The market is located on the low-lying plains of Kinshasa at an elevation of under 300 meters above sea level. The topography is predominantly flat, with gradients ranging between 0 and 4%, which contributes to poor natural drainage. This results in recurrent flooding, particularly during the rainy season, as the water table in some areas rises to ground level, causing capillary action and saturation of the soil. The terrain is composed mainly of sandy soils with clay content, which become excessively dusty in the dry season and muddy during the rains.

Although the surrounding area includes botanical and zoological gardens, the market itself lacks significant vegetation. It lies within Kinshasa's tropical climate zone, characterized by a distinct rainy season and dry season, with average temperatures ranging from 28 °C to 30 °C. The Bitshakutshaku River, a minor tributary of the Congo River, flows through the vicinity of the market.

== Organization and operation ==
The governance of the market is defined by Decree No. SC/0027/BGV/CO/Ju/NB/2006 of 28 June 2006, which establishes the administrative and functional framework for its operation. It falls under the jurisdiction of the city-province of Kinshasa, with the governor formally designated as the urban authority responsible for appointing market administrators and regulating their organization and operations. However, governance has evolved within the national context of decentralization, a process that was initiated in 2007. Under this system, urban markets are now considered a provincial matter. The provincial governor, no longer appointed by the president but elected by the provincial assembly and shares responsibility with various provincial ministers for the enforcement of decrees related to the market, including those overseeing finance, small and medium enterprises, decentralization, population, and security.

The provincial assembly also ensures the good governance of the market, which is legally categorized as a public revenue-generating entity. In theory, this governance structure makes the market an exclusive responsibility of the city and its provincial institutions. In practice, however, governance is often complicated by informal interventions from actors at the national level, particularly from the central government and the Presidency, which exert influence over market affairs to pursue their own interests.

As part of efforts to modernize the market's infrastructure and operations, the city of Kinshasa entered into a build–operate–transfer (BOT) agreement in 2005 with SAFRICOM (Société Africaine de Commerce), a private company owned by Lebanese entrepreneur Hassan Mourad. Under this agreement, SAFRICOM undertook the renovation of the market, while maintaining its traditional architectural form, and assumed managerial responsibilities, including the recruitment of operational staff to optimize revenue collection. However, this arrangement was terminated unilaterally on 7 November 2019 by the newly elected governor, Gentiny Ngobila Mbaka, who cited lack of transparency and allegations of financial mismanagement with SAFRICOM and political figures associated with the prior administration.

The management framework is divided into three main bodies:

- Management Committee: Administers the quotidian affairs of the market. It consists of a managing director, an assistant administrator in charge of administration and finance, and another assistant administrator responsible for technical matters. All members of this triad are appointed and may be dismissed at the discretion of the Governor of Kinshasa.
- Financial Unit: Tasked with fiscal oversight, this unit encompasses an accounting inspector appointed by the central government, a budget officer, and a delegated authorizing official designated by the urban directorate. This unit ensures compliance with financial regulations and manages the allocation and control of market revenues.
- Technical cells and specialized services: These are governmental service extensions operating within the market under the supervision of the management committee. Their functions align with those prescribed by national laws and urban administrative directives. The services include representatives from various ministries and state bodies:
  - Ministry of National Economy
  - Ministry of Industry and Development of Small and Medium-sized Enterprises, Small and Medium-sized Industries (Ministère de l'Industrie et Développement des Petites et Moyennes Entreprises, Petites et Moyennes Industries)
  - Ministry of Budget
  - Ministry of Agriculture and Livestock
  - Ministry of the Environment and Nature Conservation
  - Ministry of Public Health (Hygiene and Health Division)
  - Ministry of the Interior and Security (National Police)
  - Agence Nationale de Renseignements (ANR), under the Presidency of the Republic

=== Practical norms ===
==== Informal leasing, stall management, revenue distribution, and deviations ====
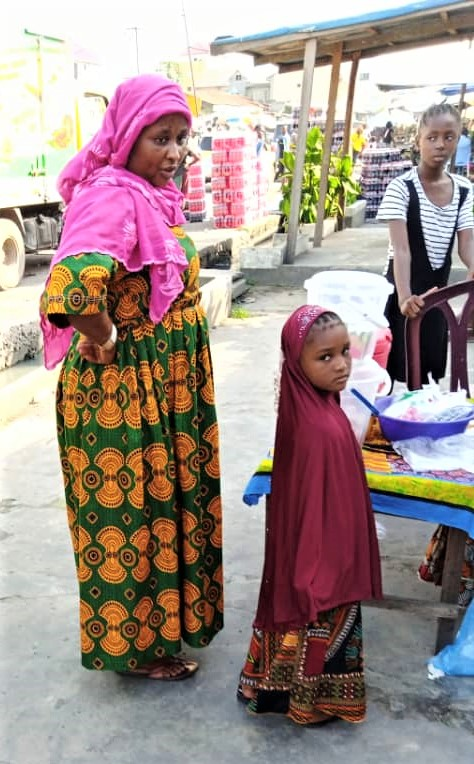
A woman dressed in a traditional African dress with a bright pink headscarf beside her young daughter wearing a maroon hijab and a patterned skirt in Kinshasa.

Vendors wishing to rent a shop in the market are officially required to pay a rental guarantee and a monthly rent set by urban government decree. These shops may not be sublet, nor can lease agreements be transferred informally. In contrast, stallholders do not pay a guarantee or monthly rent; instead, they pay a daily occupancy fee, which is also regulated by decree. Despite these rules, enforcement is often inconsistent. In practice, vendors sometimes transfer their usage rights informally, and enforcement of abandonment clauses (e.g., losing a stall due to prolonged absence) is irregular.

Official decrees establish a revenue-sharing formula for stall rental fees: 5% to the urban treasury, 65% for market operations and sanitation, 20% for the city hall's market management board, and 5% each for the local commune and vendors' unions. However, this distribution is frequently compromised. Administrators often divert funds to satisfy informal demands from senior public officials, political patrons, or clientelist networks. This reallocation reduces the resources available for market maintenance and operations. Vendors' unions frequently report not receiving their designated shares, and in some instances, administrators have opted to pay undeclared commissions to union delegates directly, undermining the unions' financial independence and organizational strength.

==== Sanitation tax, revenue manipulation, and identification form fees ====
A "sanitation tax" was introduced to address sanitation challenges and compensate for revenue shortfalls through a memorandum of understanding between the market administration and the Congo National Vendors' Union (Le Syndicat national des Vendeurs du Congo). This surcharge, initially set at 100 FC and later raised to 200 FC per stall, was meant to be used 80% for sanitation and 20% for union activities and pavilion chiefs. However, as with other revenue allocations, enforcement of this arrangement was weak, with widespread deviations from the agreed distribution.

Though not mandated by any legal instrument, market administrators introduced a $5 fee per vendor for identification forms, arguing the need for census and regulatory purposes. The imposition of this fee sparked competition between the provincial Ministries of the Interior and Finance over revenue ownership. A compromise was reached via the creation of a liaison committee, comprising officials from the urban government, market administration, and vendors' unions, which led to a new informal revenue-sharing scheme. Over time, the identification fee became a recurrent tool for raising funds, diverging further from any formal legal mandate.

==== Delegated authority and pavilion chiefs ====
Another key practical norm is the delegation of regulatory power to chefs de pavillons (pavilion chiefs), vendor-representatives who informally manage space allocation and order within specific product clusters (e.g., clothing, food, electronics). While the structure lacks legal recognition, it remains influential, having originated during Mobutu Sese Seko's presidency when unions were banned. Even after the legalization of unions in 1997, this structure endured due to its embeddedness in market culture. The role of pavilion chiefs resembles that of customary authorities in Congolese land law, functioning as locally legitimate actors in a system of community-based governance. No vendor can occupy a new space without the consent of the respective pavilion chief.

While official regulations require vendors to pay a daily stall fee for the right to occupy a stall within the market, informal practices have developed that diverge from this framework. In reality, pavilion chiefs often impose additional occupancy fees on vendors. These unofficial fees are retained by the pavilion chiefs, who in turn pay commissions to market administrators and occasionally to representatives of vendor unions. Such commissions act as a form of informal protection against administrative sanctions. This practice has evolved into a localized norm, encapsulated in a Lingala proverb: "the totem animal must be consumed by all those who know the law prohibiting its consumption", suggesting a tacit complicity among all actors aware of these unofficial arrangements. Within market jargon, the term kosomba mesa (literally "to buy a stall") is used, though the verb "to buy" signifies gaining a degree of informal control or autonomy over a selling space, rather than legal ownership.

Vendors, with the backing of pavilion chiefs, may also transfer or sublet their occupancy rights to others. These transactions often involve additional informal fees to ensure the new occupant’s name is entered into the pavilion chief’s register, thereby legitimizing the handover.

== History ==
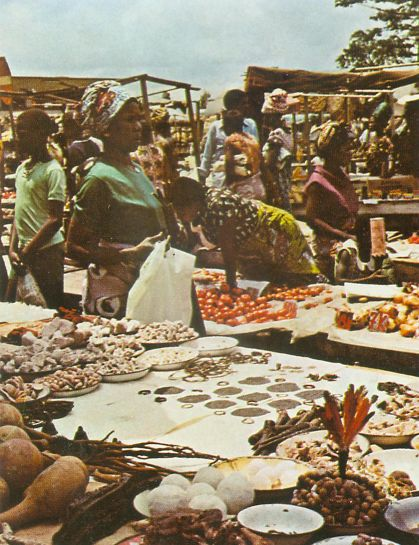
Kinshasa Central Market, ca. 1974

The Kinshasa Central Market, originally known as Marché Publique or colloquially as the "Native" or "Public" market, was inaugurated in January 1944 during the Belgian colonial period. The official opening was presided over by Vice Governor General Paul Ermens and District Commissioner Roger Le Bussy. The market was established to accommodate the commercial needs of the African population as urban growth and colonial segregation policies intensified. It was situated a few hundred meters southeast of the existing "covered" market, which had itself been relocated in 1933 from a railway right-of-way to facilitate the construction of Boulevard du 30 Juin, notably at the intersection of Tombalbaye and Mpolo Maurice avenues.

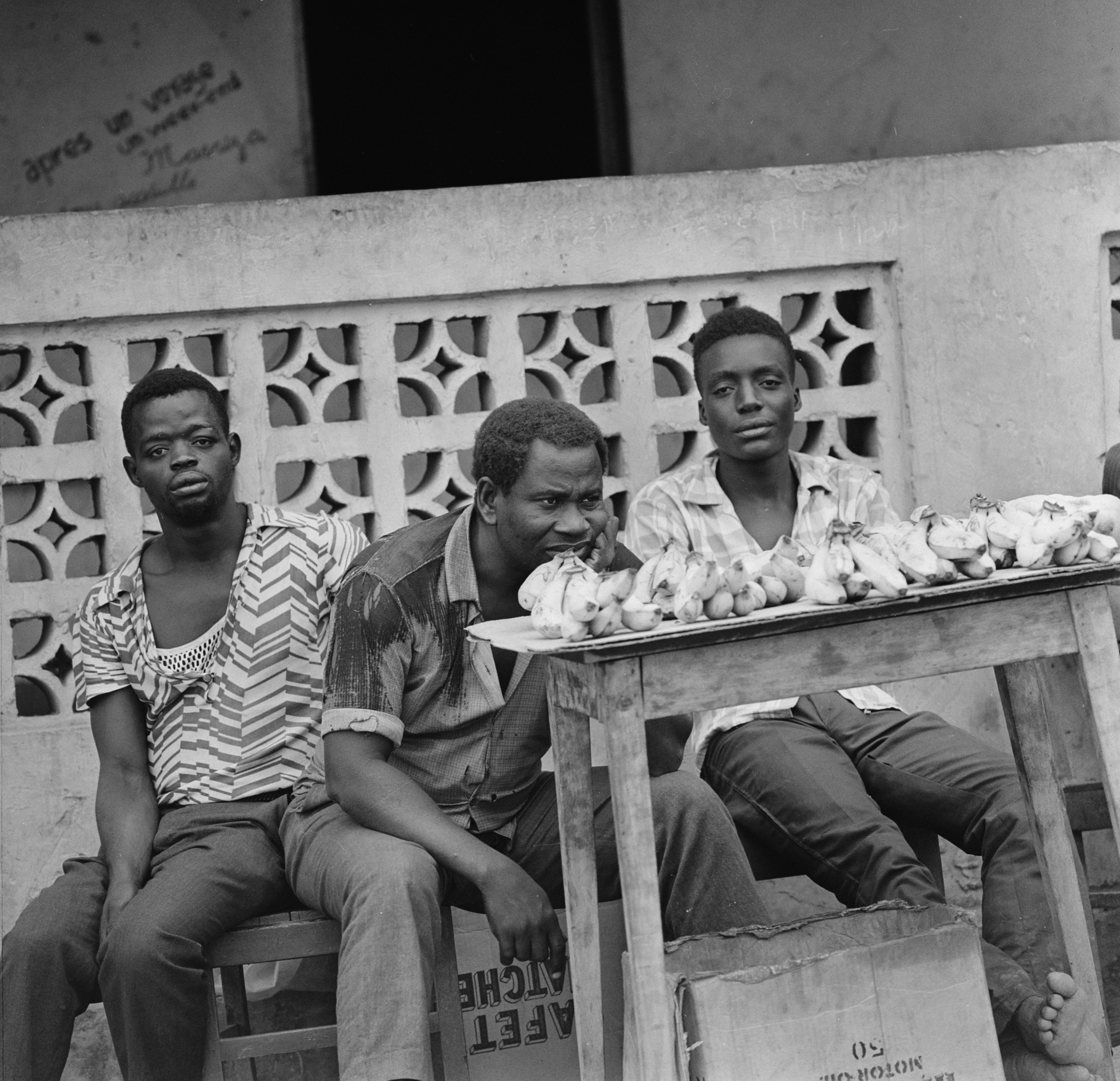
Three men seated beside a low wooden table displaying small banana bunches for sale, in front of a wall featuring perforated concrete blocks. Zaire, circa 24 October 1973.

This relocation reflected broader urban planning strategies that aimed to keep the growing European commercial district separate from the cités indigènes, neighborhoods designated for the Congolese population. The newly established marketplace, characterized by Art Deco architecture, initially housed approximately 1,200 vendors and served around 10,000 daily visitors. Its layout, with concrete stalls, contrasted with the Mediterranean style of the neighboring Marché Coupole (now known as African Lux), located across from what is today Kinshasa City Hall. Despite hesitations among some Europeans about integrating commercial spaces with the local Congolese population, colonial administrators, particularly the Comité Urbain (an advisory body chaired by the Commissaire de District), opted to avoid constructing new public infrastructure within the city proper. Instead, they relied on spaces like the market, adjacent parks, and the zoo as urban buffers. In November 1948, a restaurant was opened within the market to cater to Congolese patrons, offering meals at low prices, around 4 Belgian-Congo franc (approximately 10 US cents at the time).

Following Congo's independence in 1960, the market underwent major transformation. In 1968, the original building was demolished and rebuilt as Zando under President Mobutu Sese Seko's Authenticité policy, which aimed to reappropriate and exalt indigenous culture while systematically eradicating colonial influence with a distinctly Zairean identity. The new structure was built by local firms Collestins and SAFRICAS using more permanent construction materials. During this reconstruction, vendors temporarily relocated their activities to the Kasa-Vubu Bridge. In 1970, ten closed-roof pavilions, four open pavilions (known locally as papillotes), two public toilet blocks, and two administrative buildings were inaugurated and occupied. These facilities were designed to accommodate 3,500 vendors, in accordance with the prescriptions of Ordinance-Law No. 001 of 1 May 1970. However, rapid rural exodus, urban unemployment, and population growth soon overwhelmed the market's intended capacity, pushing the number of sellers to over 20,000. This surge led to chronic issues with overcrowding, informal occupation, and logistical strain.

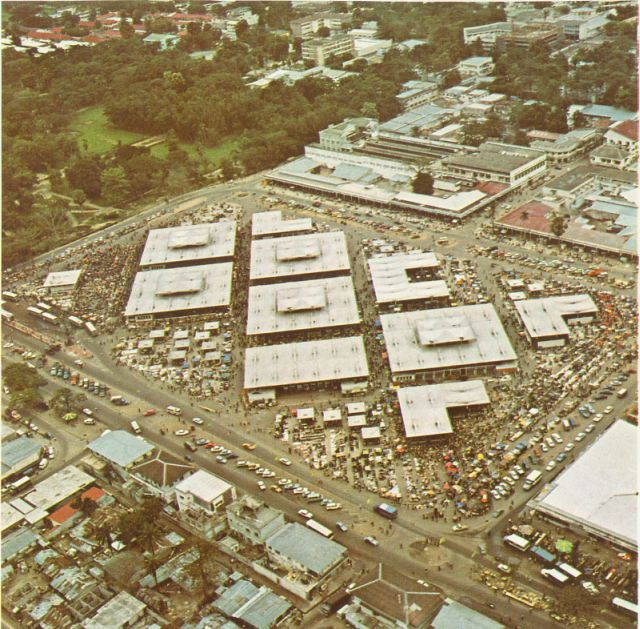
The Kinshasa Central Market in 1974

During the 1980s, as economic liberalization took root, foreign business ownership resurged, with Lebanese, Pakistani, and Indian traders taking the place of former European merchants. This period also marked the beginning of the market's spatial overflow, particularly along Lowa Avenue. Between 1983 and 1993, further liberalization of commodities and privatization of the economy opened the door to increasing numbers of Asian and Middle Eastern traders, followed by West Africans, further expanding commerce onto Kato Avenue. The 1990s ushered in an era of political instability, with the arrival of the AFDL (Alliance of Democratic Forces for the Liberation of Congo) in 1997, contributing to significant demographic shifts and a boom in informal economic activity. The market expanded beyond its official boundaries, spilling over into Luvua and Lac Moero Avenues. While these areas were not formally part of the Kinshasa Central Market, they became key zones for commercial overflow.

From 2004 onwards, the market's informal sprawl continued to grow. As a result of sustained economic hardship, vendors progressively occupied new zones, including Itaga, Tshuapa, Mbomu, Usoke, Kilosa, and Dodoma Avenues, as well as a major stretch of Luambo Makiadi Avenue (formerly Bokasa Avenue), reaching up to its intersection with Kabambare Avenue. By 2008, this expansion, which had reached Itaga Avenue, indicated a significant shift in the scale and structure of commercial activity in Kinshasa. Today, an entire neighborhood of the Kinshasa commune functions as an extended market zone, dominated by informal and semi-formal commerce.

== Rehabilitation ==
=== Intermittent initiatives ===
The first significant attempt at renovation occurred in October 2005 under the auspices of Opération Coup de Pounder, a campaign launched by Kinshasa City Hall to rehabilitate deteriorating public infrastructure. While some buildings within the market were restored, the operation met with resistance from vendors, who voiced concerns over disruption to their businesses. By January 2008, however, the market had once again fallen into disrepair, with widespread unsanitary conditions reported both inside and along the adjacent Kasa-Vubu and Rwakadingi avenues. In August 2009, a more extensive redevelopment initiative began, targeting all pavilions within the marketplace. Pavilion 9 was among the first to undergo renovation, and its occupants were evicted. The eviction, however, was controversial, as no alternative sites for relocation had been arranged for the displaced vendors. By 2014, despite generating over $4,000 in daily tax revenue from approximately 13,000 stalls, the market continued to suffer from unhygienic conditions. Only a single waste disposal truck was available to manage the estimated eight cubic meters of waste produced daily. This led to complaints from vendors, who criticized market administrators for mismanagement, as piles of refuse, standing water, and mud routinely flooded the surrounding avenues, including Ecole, Marais, Bokasa, and Lake Moero.

In 2016, accessibility issues compounded the market's deterioration. Roads that were expected to alleviate congestion, such as Avenue Flambeau and sections of Colonel Ebeya and the Kin-Mazière roundabout, became impassable due to potholes and structural collapse. Although rehabilitation work was underway on Commerce Avenue, nearby roads such as Bokassa, Ecole, and Plateau Avenues remained in poor condition, affecting both pedestrian and vehicular access. To address the chronic lack of sanitation, several local residents near the market began constructing private public toilets by 2017, charging between 500 and 1,000 Congolese francs for access. These facilities were reportedly cleaner and better maintained than those managed by the market authorities and were visited daily by 100 to 200 individuals.

=== Administrative conflicts and major rehabilitation ===
In 2005, the City of Kinshasa entered into a build–operate–transfer (BOT) contract with SAFRICOM (Société Africaine de Commerce), a private enterprise led by Lebanese businessman Hassan Mourad. Under this agreement, SAFRICOM was granted the responsibility to renovate the central market while preserving its traditional architectural layout and managing its operations. SAFRICOM also handled revenue optimization by recruiting operational facilitators to supervise and collect daily market fees. However, the partnership between SAFRICOM and the city administration became increasingly strained over the years. On 7 November 2019, Governor Gentiny Ngobila Mbaka, newly elected at the time, unilaterally terminated the BOT agreement, citing SAFRICOM's alleged failure to meet its contractual obligations. This led to a major legal and administrative dispute. In March 2020, the governor ordered the demolition of around one hundred shops constructed by SAFRICOM, claiming they were unauthorized and did not conform to the original agreement. SAFRICOM, in response, contested the move and invoked Article 20 of the BOT contract, which specified that termination required six months' notice and the involvement of a liaison committee. The matter escalated to the national level, prompting interventions by the Deputy Prime Ministers in charge of the Interior and Justice, as well as the Council of State, all of whom issued a stay of the governor's demolition order.

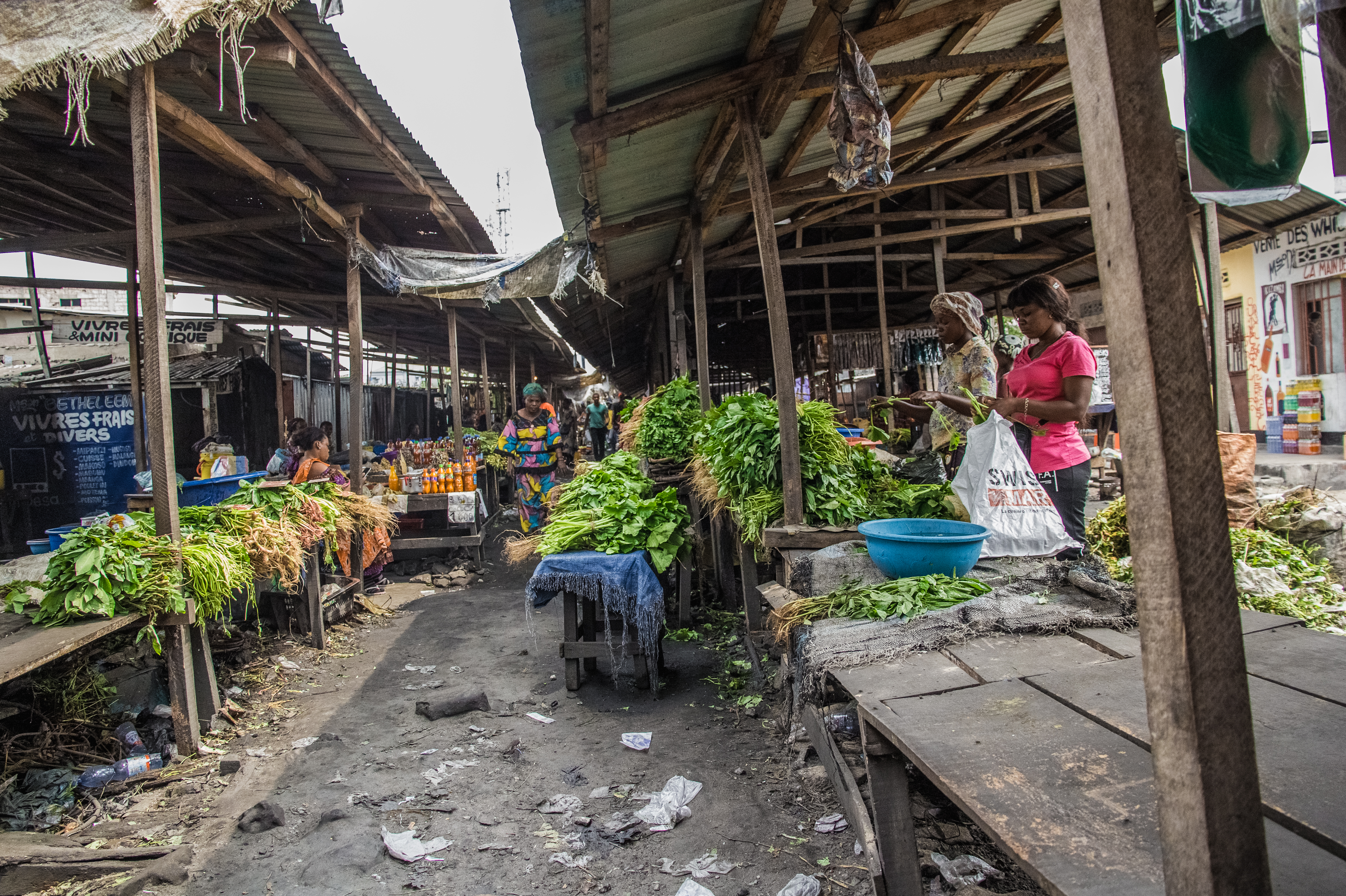
Vendors selling vegetables

Following a prolonged period of conflict and failed negotiations, provincial authorities moved forward with the rehabilitation of the market. On 20 January 2021, Kanza Ne Kongo, the provincial Minister of Agriculture acting on behalf of Governor Ngobila, formally launched renovation works at the site. The market had long been criticized for substandard sanitary conditions, including the absence of public toilets and severely obstructed drainage systems. Producing an estimated nine tons of waste daily, the facility lacked the infrastructure for proper waste disposal. The proposed redevelopment plan aimed to accommodate 62,000 vendors across a 40,000-square-meter area. It included modernized features such as organized vendor pavilions, a sanitation system, a medical facility, fire services area, banking institutions, and dedicated waste disposal units. On 18 March, the demolition of the old structures commenced. The closure displaced roughly 20,000 vendors, many of whom were relocated to nearby markets, including those at Avenue de la Libération (formerly 24 Novembre), Itaga, and Kalembe-Lembe. The decision to close the market triggered strong opposition. Vendors organized protests, one of which culminated in a large demonstration at Kinshasa City Hall. Police used tear gas to disperse the protest, leading to arrests and heightened tensions. In response to the political and social pressure, Governor Ngobila authorized the creation of a marché de crise (crisis market) near the original site. Initially, a reduced number of vendors were allowed to trade in the streets bordering the construction area under the supervision of vendors' union leaders, who organized daily cleaning and basic orders. As reconstruction delays extended over time, an increasing number of vendors reoccupied the surrounding streets and alleys near the market. This informal arrangement eventually evolved into a semi-structured temporary market managed by an ad hoc administrative office. A chargé de mission (project manager) was appointed to oversee operations, reportedly a maternal uncle of Governor Ngobila.

Further developments were announced on 16 October 2024, when Governor Daniel Bumba Lubaki unveiled plans to rehabilitate the road network surrounding the Kinshasa Central Market. The targeted roads such as Bokasa, Kasa-Vubu, Rwakadingi, Kabinda, and Kabambare avenues, were slated for resurfacing to improve traffic flow and contribute to the broader modernization of the market environment. The start date for this infrastructure work was yet to be determined and was said to be contingent on the smooth relocation of remaining vendors and the clearance of construction zones.
