= De Jaegher =

Dejaegher or De Jaegher is a Flemish surname. It has also been anglicized as DeJaegher. Notable people with the surname include:

- Bob DeJaegher (1923–2007), American politician
- Henri De Jaegher (1893–1970), Belgian cyclist
- Louis De Jaegher (1908–1973), Belgian colonial administrator
- Jasper Dejaegher (born 2001), Belgian cyclist
