= Jean Paelinck (administrator) =

Belgian colonial administrator

Governors of Kasaï Province
- In office 20 April 1955 – 27 September 1955
- Preceded by: Roger Le Bussy
- Succeeded by: Antoine Lamborelle

Governors of Katanga Province
- In office January 1956 – September 1958
- Preceded by: René Wauthion
- Succeeded by: André Schöller

Personal details
- Born: 1906 Hasselt, Belgium
- Died: 1961 (aged 54–55) Brussels, Belgium
- Occupation: Colonial Administrator

Jean Paelinck (1906–1961) was a Belgian colonial administrator. In the Belgian Congo he was appointed governor of Kasaï Province in 1955, then Katanga Province in 1956.

== Early years ==
Jean Henri Paelinck was born in Hasselt in 1906. His parents were Henri Paelinck, an accountant, and Irène Dumoulin, a seamstress. He was the first child and only boy, but had three sisters. He studied at the Royal Athenaeum and then at the Koloniale Hogeschool in Antwerp, graduating in 1928. He married Elvira Alexina Coopman on 30 July 1928.

== Colonial career ==
Paelinck left for the Congo in September 1928. He moved through the ranks. In 1949 he was appointed district commissioner of Lusambo. In 1950 he was transferred to Kabinda District. He was made provincial secretary in Lusambo and Jadotstad in 1951, and in Elisabethville in 1953. In 1954 Paelinck was appointed provincial commissioner in Elisabethville.

Paelinck succeeded Roger Le Bussy as governor of Kasaï Province on 20 April 1955. He left office on 27 September 1955, and was succeeded by Antoine Lamborelle. In January 1956 he succeeded René Wauthion as governor of Katanga Province. He held office until September 1958, when he was succeeded by André Schöller.

== Last years ==
Paelinck returned to Belgium in 1958. He settled in Brussels, where he died in 1961.

== Sources ==
- "Congo (Kinshasa) Provinces", Rulers.org
- "Paelinck, Jean (1906-1961)", hasel.be (in Dutch)
