= Léon A. Hofkens =

Belgian colonial administrator

Governor of Lusambo / Kasaï
- In office 21 September 1945 – 19 July 1948
- Preceded by: René P. Preys
- Succeeded by: Firmin Peigneux

Personal details
- Born: 13 October 1894 Brussels, Belgium
- Died: 9 January 1972 (aged 77) Taintignies, Rumes, Hainaut, Belgium
- Occupation: Teacher, colonial administrator

Léon A. Hofkens (13 October 1894 – 9 January 1972) was a Belgian colonial administrator. He was governor of Lusambo / Kasaï in the Belgian Congo from 1945 to 1948.

== Life ==
Léon Hofkens was born in Brussels, Belgium, on 13 October 1894. He obtained a normal school diploma, and worked for six years as a teacher in Brussels. In July 1920 he joined the territorial service in the Belgian Congo. Hofkens' first assignment was as a territorial agent in the territory of Lodja, Sankuru District. During his second term he was territorial administrator of Lusambo, then of Dimbelenge, a new territory that he was responsible for organizing. In 1927 he was made deputy district commissioner of Sankuru. From 1931 to 1933 he was deputy district commissioner of Bas-Congo District, then from 1934 to 1941 titular district commissioner of Bas-Congo.

At the start of World War II (1939–1945), in the second half of 1939 the administration was concerned about the politico-religious Mission des Noirs (Mission of the Blacks) movement, associated with Kimbanguism and the Salvation Army. On 5 December 1939 Marcel Maquet wrote to governor general Pierre Ryckmans opposing measures of clemency to Kimbanguists who renounced that movement, then returned to it. On 10 December 1939 Hofkens gave secret instructions to administrators in Bas-Congo in which he confirmed that he thought the Mission des Noirs was xenophic and subversive, but proposed that the natives who followed the movement should not be seen as vulgar delinquents, but as being engaged in a dangerous adventure. Persuasion was the way to bring them to their senses, rather than repression. He proposed that repeat offenders be subject to relatively small fines or penal servitude, proportional to the offense, and the leader of a village or organizer of a meeting should be punished rather than all the people.

Hofkens' 7th term started in 1941, when he was appointed provincial commissioner of Sankuru, holding office until 1943. In 1945 the districts of Kasai (capital at Luebo), Sankuru (capital at Lusambo) and Lomami (capital at Kabinda) were reorganized in the Kasaï Province, with its capital at Luluabourg. Hofkens was appointed governor of Lusambo Province on 21 September 1945. He replaced René P. Preys. In 1947 the name of the province was changed to Kasaï Province. Hofkens held office until 19 July 1948. He was replaced by Firmin Peigneux.

Hofkens was made a member of the Royal Order of the Lion on 8 April 1947. On 20 August 1949 Leon-A.-F. Hofkens, honorary provincial governor, was promoted to the rank of commander of the order. Hofkens died in Taintignies, Hainaut, Belgium, on 9 January 1972.

== Sources ==
- Belgium (1949), Belgisch staatsblad
- "Congo (Kinshasa) Provinces", Rulers.org
- Gille, A. (20 November 1972), "HOFKENS (Léon)", Biographie Belge d'Outre-Mer (in French), vol. VII–B, Académie Royale des Sciences d'Outre-Mer, pp. col. 192–195
- Zana Etambala, Mathieu (2005), "L'Armee du Salut et la Naissance de la 'mission Des Noirs' au Congo Belge, 1934 – 1940", Annales Aequatoria (in French), 26, Honoré Vinck: 67–164, JSTOR 25836854
