= Firmin Peigneux =

Belgian colonial administrator

Governor of Kasaï Province
- In office 19 July 1948 – 11 April 1952
- Preceded by: Léon A. Hofkens
- Succeeded by: Roger Le Bussy

Personal details
- Born: 1904 Moha, Wanze, Liège, Belgium
- Died: 1968 (aged 63–64) Huy, Liège, Belgium
- Occupation: Colonial administrator

Firmin Peigneux (1904–1968) was a Belgian colonial administrator. He was governor of Kasaï Province in the Belgian Congo from 1948 to 1952.

== Life ==
Firmin J. A. Peigneux was born in 1904 in the village of Moha, Liège. His parents were Arthur Joseph Peigneux (1876–1942) and Flore Lega (1879–1952). He joined the colonial service and arrived in the Belgian Congo in 1925 at the age of 21. Peigneux spent his entire colonial career in the southwest of the Belgian Congo, in Bas-Congo, Léopoldville and Kasaï. In 1926 his supervisor said in an evaluation report, "This officer has the qualities needed to become an elite administrator in the short term." He was sensible, tactful and thoughtful in his dealings with the natives, and that had earned him the confidence of leaders and elders.

Pierre Ryckmans travelled through Bas-Congo District in 1930–1931 investigating labor conditions. He reached the territory of Thysville on 6 November 1930, where Peigneux was the administrator 1st class. He found that censuses had badly under-counted dependent women and children, and excessive numbers of Africans were being employed by the European companies and on the railway. The north of the territory, near the river, held the center of Kimbanguism. Peigneux showed Ryckmans examples of Kimbanguist chants, psalm-like hymns that proclaimed the glory of the pure and the confusion of the unfaithful, Black and White, when Jesus would return. They interpreted the Old Testament curses against evil kings as allusions to missionaries and administrators.

Peigneux became commissioner of Kwango District, with capital at Kikwit. He became Governor of Kasaï Province on 19 July 1948, replacing Léon A. Hofkens. He held office until 11 April 1952, and was replaced by Roger Le Bussy. Peigneux had been recalled to Belgium for health reasons. He was one of the few provincial governors who were openly socialist in their views. Peigneux was admitted to the Order of Léopold on 15 November 1946. He was promoted to the rank of officer on 19 October 1949.

Peigneux's signature as a director, and that of governor Hector Martin, appears on notes of the Central Bank of Belgian Congo and Rwanda-Burundi (Banque Centrale du Congo Belge et du Ruanda-Urundi) between 1956 and 1958. In 1957 he was elected a member of the International Institute of Differing Civilizations. He was a member of a commission of inquiry sent to Rwanda in January 1960 to report on the violence there in November 1959. He died in 1968 in Huy, Liège at the age of 64.

== Publications ==
- Firmin Peigneux (1953), L'Evolution économique des populations congolaises, Bruxelles: Fondation Louis de Brouckère, p. 48

== Sources ==
- "20 francs Type 1956", Numizon
- "500 francs Type 1957", Numizon
- "1000 francs Type 1958", Numizon
- Baret, Monique, "Firmin PEIGNEUX (1904-1968)", Genealigie Monica – via Genealogy Online
- Belgium (1949), Belgisch staatsblad
- "Congo (Kinshasa) Provinces", Rulers.org
- Institute News / Nouvelles de l'Institut Civilisations, vol. 7, Institut de Sociologie de l'Université de Bruxelles, 1957, pp. 306–323, JSTOR 41231314
- Peigneux, F.; Malengreau, G.; Frédéricq, S. (26 February 1960), Rapport de la Commission d'Enquete de Janvier 1960 au Rwanda (PDF), Brussels
- Vanderlinden, Jacques (2007), Main-d'œuvre, Eglise, Capital et Administration dans le Congo des années trente (PDF), Fontes Historiæ Africanæ (in French), vol. I, Academie Royale Des Sciences D’outre-mer
- Van Reybrouck, David (9 May 2019), Congo (in Spanish), Penguin Random House Grupo Editorial España, ISBN 978-84-306-1978-8
- Vanthemsche, Guy (1999), "De Belgische socialisten en Congo 1895-1960", TGSB (in Dutch), 4 (2), doi:10.21825/br.v4i2.2790
