= Lecithocera semnodora =

Scientific classification
- Kingdom: Animalia
- Phylum: Arthropoda
- Class: Insecta
- Order: Lepidoptera
- Family: Lecithoceridae
- Genus: Lecithocera
- Species: L. semnodora

Binomial name
- Lecithocera semnodora Meyrick, 1933

Synonyms
- Torodora semnodora (Meyrick, 1933)

Species of moth in the genus Lecithocera

Lecithocera semnodora is a moth in the family Lecithoceridae. It was described by Edward Meyrick in 1933. It is found in the Democratic Republic of the Congo in the provinces of Katanga, Kasai-Occidental and Équateur.
