= Constant Wauters =

Belgian colonial official

Commissioner of Lusambo
- In office 1 October 1933 – 17 August 1940
- Preceded by: Paul Ermens
- Succeeded by: François Wenner

Personal details
- Born: 25 April 1889
- Occupation: Colonial administrator

Constant Wauters (born 25 April 1889) was a Belgian colonial official. He was commissioner of Lusambo Province in the Belgian Congo from 1 October 1933 to 17 August 1940.

== Life ==
Constant Joseph Antoine Wauters was born on 25 April 1889. He entered the colonial service on 29 September 1910.

In 1927 Wauters was urban commissioner of Léopoldville. He was concerned that the slum-like Cité Indigène was too close to the European town, and potentially a source of disease. He proposed four related policies for African townships: they should be separated from the European quarters by a "neutral zone"; sanitation should be provided for; they should be compact rather than fragmented; and they should adhere to standard construction approaches. Wauters favored having all the houses built by one firm rather than leaving it up to the residents, but did not want the government directly involved in construction of housing.

Wauters was named Commissaire général assistant to the governor of the province of Congo-Kasaï on 1 April 1930. On 4 June 1931 Wauters temporarily assumed the role of governor of Congo-Kasai in place of Joseph Beernaert, who was temporarily replacing Governor General Auguste Tilkens. Due to disturbances among the African population, Wauters asked for reinforcements and changed the stature of the Kikwit and Kandale territories from Occupation to Police Operation. Wauters was active in directing the forces of Congo-Kasaï as the revolt of the Pende people progressed. Order had been restored by September 1931.

The administrative reform of 1933 rearranged the four original provinces into six new provinces, created a single deputy governor general, and removed this title from the heads of the provinces, who were now called provincial commissioners. Wauters was among them. On 1 October 1933 he succeeded Paul Ermens, governor of Congo-Kasaï, as commissioner of the new province of Lusambo, which was formed from the eastern part of Congo-Kasaï, a small part of Equateur Province and the Lomami District of Katanga Province. He left office on 11 September 1940 and was succeeded by R. Wenner.

In 1949 Wauters published a 384-page book L'ésotérie des Noirs dévoilée about the Bukishi of the Basonge people living along the Lomami River. His main interest was in the secret knowledge of the Bukishi rather than their sociological function. He saw their doctrine as being concerned with understanding and experiencing the ultimate reality as a vital force, and interpreted their texts in terms of symbolic meaning, but he left in doubt the authenticity of this interpretation.

== Publications ==
- Constant Wauters (c. 1916), "Notes sur les Basonge Lusambo", Papiers Guebels Archives historiques MRA
- C. Wauters, Gouverneur de Province honoraire du Congo belge (1949), L'ésotérie des Noirs dévoilée, Bruxelles: Éditions européennes, p. 384

== Sources ==
- "Congo (Kinshasa) Provinces", Rulers.org
- Lusamba Kibayu, Michel (2008), La Typologie des quartiers dans l'histoire du développement de Léopoldville-Kinshasa en République Démocratique du Congo
- Maquet, J. J. (October 1949), L'ésotérie des Noirs dévoilée : Review of Books, vol. 19, International African Institute
- Vanderlinden, Jacques (15 April 1994), Pierre Ryckmans 1891-1959: Coloniser dans l'honneur, De Boeck Supérieur, ISBN 978-2-8041-1881-5
- Vanderstraeten, Louis-François (2001), La répression de la révolte des Pende du Kwango en 1931 (PDF) (in French), Academie Royale des Sciences d’Outre-mer
