= Roger Le Bussy =

Belgian colonial administrator

Governor of Kasaï
- In office July 1952 – June 1954
- Preceded by: Firmin Peigneux
- Succeeded by: Jean Paelinck

Personal details
- Born: 12 February 1901 Herstal, Belgium
- Died: 13 September 1967 (aged 66)
- Occupation: Colonial administrator

Roger Le Bussy (12 February 1901 – 13 September 1967) was a Belgian colonial administrator. He was governor of Kasaï Province in the Belgian Congo from 1952 to 1954.

== Early years and family ==
Roger Le Bussy was born on 12 February 1901 in Herstal, Belgium. His parents were Louis le Bussy (1869–1957) and Maria Anna Julie Henriette Nina Dollard (1873–1938). His family included coal miners, needle makers and merchants of iron, lead and alum. He attended the Faculty of Political and Administrative Sciences at the Colonial University of Antwerp from 1921 to 1924. He married Emma Dulac, with whom he had one child, Paul. His second marriage was in 1931 to Emma Bodson, with whom he had another child, Roger.

== Colonial career ==
Le Bussy's first term of duty in the Belgian Congo was from September 1924 to October 1927. His internship was in the Équateur Province. He was then made a territorial administrator 2nd class in the Lake Leopold II District. In July 1927 he was promoted to territorial administrator 1st class. Le Bussy was head administrator of the Inongo Territory when he wrote a report on 27 September 1927 about the Ntombankole, a sub-tribe of the Ntomba people. He traced their history from their origins in the southern region of Lake Tumba to their settlement around Lake Leopold II. His second term was from June 1928 to July 1931. He was again assigned to Inongo Territory in Lake Leopold II District. In January 1930 he was promoted to principal territorial administrator.

Le Bussy was once more assigned to Lake Leopold II District for his third term, starting in December 1931. On 10 November 1933 he was appointed deputy judge of the Lake Leopold II district court. In July 1934 he was appointed attaché to the secretary general of AIMO (Affaires Indigènes et Main-d'Oeuvre: Indigenous and Labor Affairs). He went on leave from December 1934 to July 1935. On his return he was again principal territorial administrator, and in March 1937 was assigned to Léopoldville Province. Le Bussy was appointed district commissioner 2nd class in July 1938. He took leave in Europe from January to July 1939.

On his return le Bussy was appointed urban district commissioner of Léopoldville. At the start of World War II (1939–1945) the colonial government decided to draw up a five-year plan for the development of Léopoldville. The plan centered on the main boulevard. First a roundabout had to be developed around the site of the Albert I monument, followed by the drainage network and the road in front of the station. Work went slowly. On 24 September 1941 Le Bussy ordered that funds for construction of a bridge were to be diverted to coating the boulevard in vibrated concrete. The boulevard became the first axis of the city to have sanitary facilities. In January 1944 le Bussy and Vice Governor General Paul Ermens inaugurated the new native market in Leopoldville. It was to the southeast of the old covered market, moved there to let the European commercial district expand.

Le Bussy was promoted to district commissioner 1st class in February 1943. Due to the wartime occupation of Belgium by Germany, his leave was in Astrida, Rwanda, and lasted only from February to April 1943. His sixth term of service lasted from April 1943 to October 1945. From June 1946 to June 1949 Le Bussy was commissioner of Uele District. From December 1949 to December 1951 he was assigned to the governor of Kivu Province. Le Bussy returned after leave in March 1952, and in July 1952 was promoted to provincial governor and placed in charge of Kasai Province. He replaced Firmin Peigneux. He was relieved of his duties due to unfitness for colonial service in June 1954. He formally left office on 27 March 1955, and was replaced by Jean Paelinck. He died on 13 September 1967.

== Sources ==
- Cocatrix, Anne-Laure (2013), Boulevard du 30 Jun, histire et perspectives d'avenir (Thesis) (in French), Free University of Brussels
- "Congo (Kinshasa) Provinces", Rulers.org
- "Le Bussy, Robert", Africamuseum.be
- lebussy, "Roger le Bussy", Geneanet
- Mwana Mboka (6 February 2011), Kinshasa Then and Now
- Philippe, René (1953), "Les Ntomb'e Njale du Lac Léopold II", Aequatoria, 16e Année (2), Honoré Vinck: 41–48, JSTOR 25838289
- Yans, Maurice (1963), "Le chateau et le bien rural d'Oulhaye à Saint-Georges-sur-Meuse" (PDF), Chronique Archéologique du Pays de Liège (in French)
