= François Wenner =

Belgian colonial administrator

Commissioner, then governor of Lusambo Province
- In office 11 September 1940 – 9 June 1944
- Preceded by: Constant Wauters
- Succeeded by: Albert-Émile de Beauffort

Personal details
- Born: 19 July 1889 Ettelbruck, Grand Duchy of Luxembourg
- Died: 4 December 1965 (aged 76) Luxembourg, Grand Duchy of Luxembourg
- Occupation: Soldier, colonial administrator

François Wenner (19 July 1889 – 4 December 1965) was a Belgian colonial administrator. He was commissioner / governor of Lusambo Province in the Belgian Congo from 1940 to 1944.

== Early years ==
François Wenner was born on 19 July 1889 in the Grand Duchy of Luxembourg. He entered the Belgian army, leaving as a commandant in 1918. He joined the colonial service on 4 July 1920.

== Colonial service ==
Wenner left for the Congo in 1920 as a colonial administrator at Lebo, Bas-Uélé, and then in the Sankuru region. He was appointed district commissioner, first class on 1 January 1929. He was district commissioner of Sankuru District, with headquarters at Lusambo from September 1931 to January 1932.

On 11 September 1940 Wenner succeeded Constant Wauters as commissioner of Lusambo Province. His position was renamed to governor in 1941. He left office on 9 June 1944, and was succeeded by R.P. Preys. In 1947 he was appointed governor of Équateur in place of Van Hoeck, the interim governor who had replaced Eugène J.F. Henry. In 1950 he was replaced by Luc Breuls de Tiecken.

== Last years, death and legacy ==
Wenner was made a member of the Royal Order of the Lion on 8 April 1947. On 20 August 1949 he was promoted to commander of the order. On 17 April 1957 F. Wenner, honorary provincial governor of the Belgian Congo, was among the guests at the inauguration of the Franco-Belgo-Luxembourgeoise tourism exposition. Wenner died in 1964. He had two children, a daughter Sanki (1921–2001) and a son Jean-Paul (1930–2001). He made an important collection of African art, including the famous statue of Tulantshedy Matak, Kuba Regent, who lived in the 17th century. He exhibited this statue at the Antwerp exhibition of 1937 with 16 other royal Kuba statues.

== Sources ==
- Belgium (1949), Belgisch staatsblad
- "Commissaire de district de Sankuru, François Wenner., 1931 sept. - 1932 janv.", AfricaMuseum
- "Congo (Kinshasa) Provinces", Rulers.org
- Grunne, Bernard de (11 December 2002), "Description du lot 136 : Cinq coupes Kuba et une cuillère en calebasse", Auction.fr
- Luxembourg (April 1957), "L'inauguration d'une Exposition touristique Franco-Belgo-Luxembourgeoise" (PDF), Bulletin de Documentation
- Vanderstraeten, Louis-François (2001), La répression de la révolte des Pende du Kwango en 1931 (PDF) (in French), Academie Royale des Sciences d’Outre-mer
