= Barthélemy Mukenge =

Congolese politician (1925–2018)

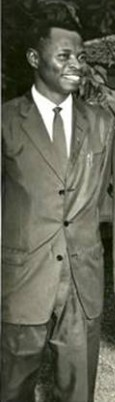
- Mukenge in 1960

President of Kasaï Province
- In office 11 June 1960 – January 1962
- In office July 1962 – September 1962

Personal details
- Born: 3 August 1925 Kalomba, Kamuandu Sector, Dibaya Territory, Belgian Congo
- Died: 4 July 2018 (aged 92) Kananga, Democratic Republic of the Congo
- Party: Union National Congolaise; Mouvement Populaire de la Révolution

Barthélemy Mukenge Nsumpi Shabantu (3 August 1925 – 4 July 2018) was a Congolese politician who served as President of Kasaï Province from 11 June 1960 to January 1962 and July to September 1962. He was a president of the Association des Lulua-Frères, a Lulua ethnic syndicate, and a leading member of the Union National Congolaise. Though initially allied with nationalist Patrice Lumumba, he later denounced him and aligned himself with more moderate politicians. Following the division of Kasai Province in late 1962, Mukenge became Minister of Health and Minister of Social Affairs of the new Luluabourg Province. He later served as Governor of Kivu Province and on the Political Bureau of the Mouvement Populaire de la Révolution. He withdrew from politics in 1974 and died in 2018.

== Biography ==
Barthélemy Mukenge was born on 3 August 1925 in the village of Kalomba, Kamuandu Sector, Dibaya Territory, Belgian Congo. A Lulua, he was related to the paramount chief, Sylvestre Mangole Kalamba. He fathered 14 children. He underwent three years of education at the Mikalayi normal school. In 1959 Mukenge became the director of the primary school of the Notre Dame Catholic mission in Luluabourg. He served as president of the Association des Lulua-Frères and was a leading member of the Union Nationale Congolaise (UNC) party, adhering to its "moderate and more traditionalist" faction. He frequently criticised the Belgian colonial Governor of Kasaï Province, De Jaeger.

=== President of Kasai Province ===
Following the general elections in May 1960, Mukenge entered a political alliance with Mouvement National Congolais leader Patrice Lumumba, giving him a majority anti-Luba coalition in the provincial assembly. As a result, on 11 June Mukenge was elected President of Kasaï Province, carrying 50 of the 70 assembly votes. He attempted to form a government of unity, but prominent Luba politician Joseph Ngalula weakened his efforts by refusing to join his cabinet. Luba politicians declared their own provincial government on 14 June. Mukenge announced his completed government two days later. He was also elected to the Senate, but forfeited his seat to focus on his provincial responsibilities. Upon taking office he encouraged ethnic reconciliation in Kasai, and when the Congo Crisis broke out the following month he attempted to calm the disorders and encouraged European residents to remain in the country. When on 9 July the Luluabourg garrison mutinied and the local Europeans barricaded themselves in a factory, he unsuccessfully attempted to get both factions to negotiate. In August he appealed to the central government to purge the mutineers from the army and to put down Albert Kalonji's secession in the southern portion of the province. Worried about economic conditions in the province, Mukenge led a delegation to Kivu Province in September to discuss the economy and in November agreed to dispatch another one to Katanga. He participated in the constitutional negotiations of the Léopoldville Conference of January 1961, the Tananarive Conference of March, and the Coquilhatville Conference of May.

When an ideological split formed in his government over a fracture in national politics between the nationalist Lumumba and more moderate elements in the capital, Mukenge sided with the moderate Minister of Interior, Luhata. This led another one of his ministers, Albert Onya, and numerous Batetela to accuse him of facilitating the arrest of Lumumba in Kasai by central government authorities. The people of the Sankuru region aligned themselves with Lumumba, and consequently Mukenge's government neglected them and withheld funds to the area. In February 1961, while on a diplomatic mission in Brussels, he denounced his past ties with Lumumba, saying "We Lulua, we have entered into an electoral and post-election alliance with Lumumba, but since then we have regained our freedom." He also appealed to the Belgian government to mediate between hostile Lulua and Luba factions and requested economic aid for Kasai, warning that "The Lumumbists are in danger of exploiting hunger and unemployment at home if the Free World does not help us." When Lumumbist troops from the rebellious "Free Republic of the Congo" entered Luluabourg unopposed, he wired a message to the city's garrison, calling for the "mobilisation of the population of Kasai" to "repel" the incursion. In November 1961 mutinous troops raped and harassed several Belgians in Luluabourg. Many Europeans then attempted to leave Kasai, but Mukenge prohibited them from doing so, contributing to the state of panic among the white population.

Mukenge was unseated by the provincial assembly and replaced by André Lubaya in January 1962. He characterised his deposition as a "coup d'etat" and contested the election of Lubaya on the grounds that several unqualified provincial deputies had cast votes and demanded that Parliament reverse the result. He returned to the office in July and held it until September. In August he appealed for Kasaians, specifically the Lulua, to remain calm and place their trust in his government so that "all misunderstandings can be ironed out."

=== Later life ===
In late 1962 Kasai Province was subdivided; a new Province of Luluabourg was established. On 18 September François Luakabuanga was elected President and Mukenge became his Minister of Health and Minister of Social Affairs. In late October 1961 he and several Lulua leaders made a symbolic union with Kalonji in an attempt to end the Luba-Lulua ethnic conflict. On 10 May 1963 the provincial assembly delivered a motion of censure against Luakabuanga, dismissing him from office. Mukenge offered himself as a candidate for the presidency of the province, but was disregarded by the assemblymen in favor of Lubaya. Under Joseph-Desiré Mobutu's presidency, he acted as Governor of Kivu for four and a half years. He later served on the Political Bureau of the Mouvement Populaire de la Révolution and was a member of the Legislative Council. From 1970 until 1972 he was a state inspector. Mukenge retired from politics in 1974. He died at 03:00 on 4 July 2018 in Kananga (formerly Luluabourg) at the age of 92. An avenue in the city is named after him.
