= Dibaya =

- Commune
- Location in the Democratic Republic of the Congo
- Coordinates: 6°30′S 22°56′E
- Country: DR Congo
- Province: Kasai-Central
- Territory: Dibaya

Population (2009)
  - Total: 5,213
- Time zone: UTC+2 (Central Africa Time)

Dibaya is a small town in Kasai-Central province of southern Democratic Republic of the Congo. As of 2009 it had an estimated population of 5,213. Dibaya has an airport with regular flights to Kinshasa, Kikwit and Angola.

As a result of the Kasaï-Central clashes, between February 9, 2017 and February 13, 2017, 101 Kamwina Nsapu militia members were killed by the Armed Forces of the Democratic Republic of the Congo in Dibaya.
