= André Lubaya =

André Guillaume Lubaya
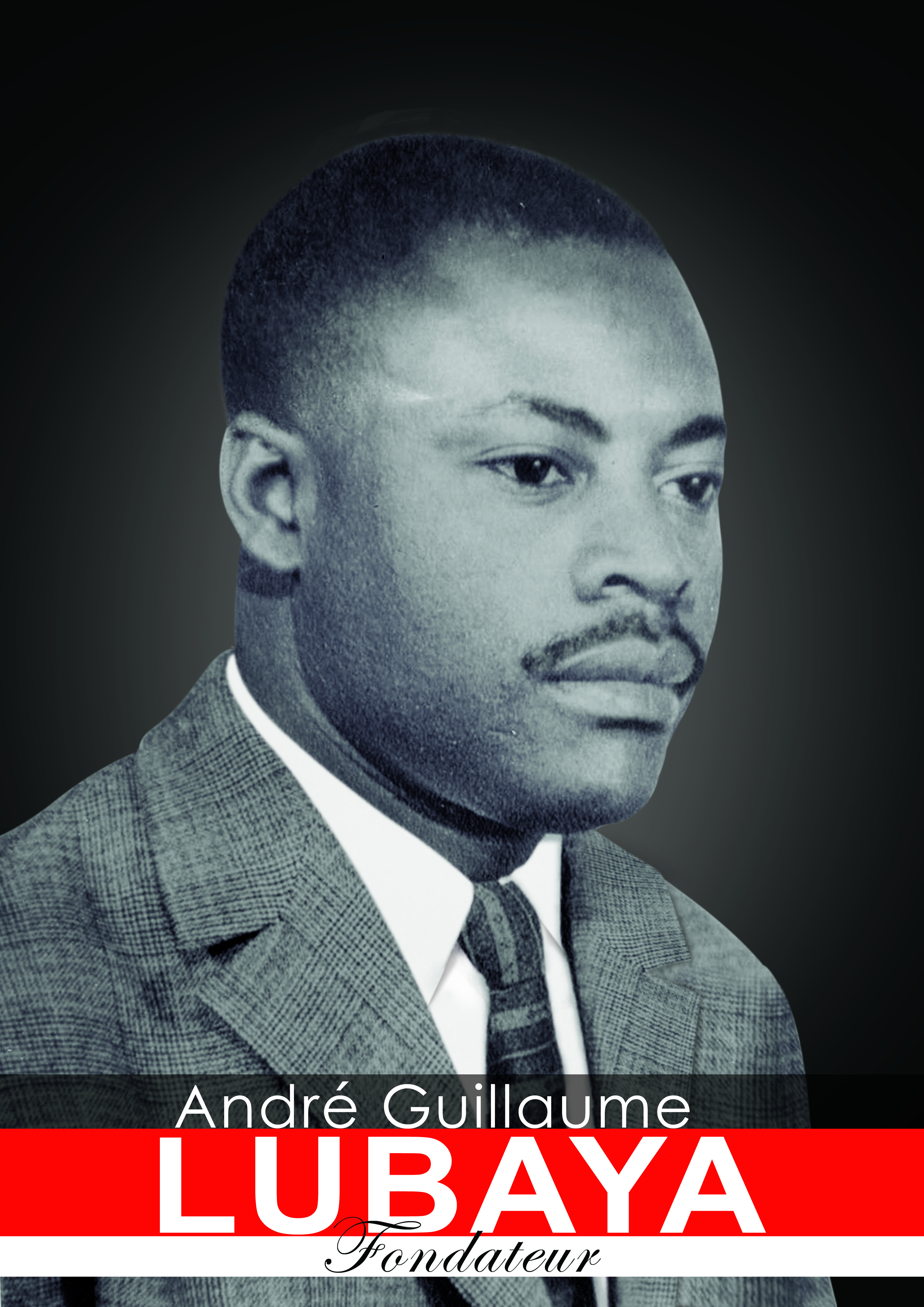

Minister of Economy of the Democratic Republic of the Congo
- In office November 1965 – 2 May 1968
- President: Joseph-Désiré Mobutu

President of Kasai Province
- In office January 1962 – July 1962
- Preceded by: Barthélemy Mukenge

Minister of Interior of Luluabourg Province
- In office 18 September 1962 – May 1963
- Preceded by: Barthélemy Mukenge

Personal details
- Born: 28 March 1932 Kazumba Territory, Kasai Province, Belgian Congo
- Died: 2 May 1968 (aged 36) Democratic Republic of the Congo
- Party: Union National Congolaise; Union Démocratique Africaine

André Guillaume Lubaya (28 March 1932 – 2 May 1968) was a Congolese politician who served twice as the President of Kasai Province and later as the Minister of Economy of the Democratic Republic of the Congo. He was the founder of the African Democratic Union (UDA) political party.

== Biography ==
André Lubaya was born on 28 March 1932 in the Kazumba Territory, Kasai Province, Belgian Congo to a Bena-Ngoshi (Lulua) family. His father was Catholic and his mother was Protestant.

In the 1960 general elections, Lubaya won a seat on a Union National Congolaise (UNC) ticket in the Chamber of Deputies with 9,946 preferential votes. On 2 August 1961 a new government under Cyrille Adoula was presented to Parliament for a vote of confidence. Lubaya joined a few other deputies in expressing concerns about the government's sincerity in guaranteeing the safety and freedom of expression of the parliamentarians. He was the only deputy not to vote in favor of investing the government; he abstained.

In December 1961 the Kasai Provincial Assembly elected Lubaya Provincial President. He was seated the following January, replacing Barthélemy Mukenge. Both were members of the Lulua-dominated UNC, but while Lubaya was a member of the "modernist and revolutionary" tendency in the party, Mukenge adhered to the "moderate and more traditionalist" faction. Under Lubaya's rule more attention was given to the needs of the population of the Sankuru region, which were neglected by his predecessor. His government took a legalistic approach towards its work. Mukenge meanwhile contested the election of Lubaya on the grounds that several unqualified provincial deputies had participated in the election and demanded that Parliament reverse the result. He returned to the office in July 1962, causing Lubaya to appeal to the United Nations Operation in the Congo for security. The following month he relinquished their protection. Soon thereafter the provinces of the Congo were divided up and a new Luluabourg Province was created. A power struggle over the Luluabourg government ensued. On 18 September a government under François Luakabuanga was installed. Lubaya hesitantly accepted the post of Minister of the Interior. Seven days later at the inaugural ceremony, Lubaya delivered a speech denouncing the fact that he had not been made Provincial President.

On 11 May 1963 the provincial assembly, following a motion of censure against Luakabuanga, elected Lubaya as President before police interrupted the session and arrested several deputies. As a result, 12 other deputies traveled to the capital and lobbied for Parliament to confirm Lubaya's investiture, which occurred in an extraordinary session in August. However, shortly thereafter Central Government Minister of Interior Joseph Maboti arrested Lubaya and affirmed the legitimacy of Luakabuanga's government. Lubaya fled to Brazzaville where he joined other nationalist dissidents on 3 October in founding the Conseil National de Libération (CNL), a revolutionary organisation with the goal of overthrowing the Congolese government. He was given the responsibility of managing the organisation's internal affairs.

On 18 October 1965 Lubaya was appointed Minister of Economy of the Congo.

Lubaya did not approve of Mobutu's coup in 1965 and refused to join his party, the Mouvement Populaire de la Révolution. Nevertheless, he became Mobutu's Minister of Economy. In October 1966 Lubaya introduced a resolution in the Chamber that urged the government to break off diplomatic relations with Portugal—which was suspected of supporting rebellion from Angola—and close all foreign consulates in the country. It passed unanimously.

Meanwhile, Lubaya felt increasingly marginalised by the Lulua paramount chief, Kalamba Mangole. He announced his break from the UNC in a speech and subsequently organised his own party, the Union Démocratique Africaine. UNC leader Alphonse Ilunga then allegedly reported Lubaya's opposition to Mobutu's regime. In 1968 Mobutu made an official visit Luluabourg during which he announced that a plot to overthrow his regime was being orchestrated by several Kasai senators. He initiated an investigation and personally instructed his agents to bring in Lubaya, dead or alive, with an offer of 500 zaires to the individual who fulfilled the request. Lubaya was arrested on 2 May and brought to a military camp where he was summarily executed. His family never received the body.
