= List of provinces of the Democratic Republic of the Congo by Human Development Index =

This is a list of 11 former provinces of the Democratic Republic of the Congo (from 1997 to 2015) by Human Development Index as of 2025 with data for the year 2023.

Rank	Province	HDI (2023)
Medium human development
1	Kinshasa	0.623
Low human development
2	Nord-Kivu	0.543
3	Sud-Kivu	0.532
–	Democratic Republic of the Congo	0.522
4	Bas-Congo	0.521
5	Orientale	0.508
6	Katanga	0.507
7	Bandundu	0.499
8	Equateur	0.498
9	Kasai Oriental	0.492
10	Maniema	0.472
11	Kasai-Occidental	0.446

== See also ==
- List of countries by Human Development Index
