= Tananarive Conference (1961) =

The Tananarive Conference was held in Tananarive, Malagasy Republic between various leaders in the ongoing Congo Crisis in March 1961. The meeting took place shortly after the assassination of Patrice Lumumba in January and sought to resolve the conflict, especially between the First Congolese Republic government in Léopoldville and the secessionist State of Katanga in Elizabethville. A third party—Lumumba ally Antoine Gizenga, headquartered in Stanleyville—did not attend and rejected the result.

The parties resolved that the Congo would be split into a federated state under the loose leadership of Joseph Kasa-Vubu. The plan was ultimately scuppered, due in part to the opposition of the Stanleyville Lumumbists.

== Plan ==
The meeting was held from March 8-12 in Tananarive, the capital city of the Malagasy Republic. It was convened in the context of the assassination of Patrice Lumumba as well as the United Nations Security Council Resolution 161 from February 21, which explicitly allowed the use of force by the United Nations Operation in the Congo (ONUC) as a last resort. M. Crawford Young wrote that the conference coincided with Moïse Tshombe's peak of power. Tshombe sought the outcome of a confederation and was the only negotiator that was allowed to bring in an outside legal counselor that could help draft such a constitution. Representatives from Leopoldville put up little opposition to Tshombe's drafted government.

The participants included South Kasai premier Albert Kalonji, Évariste Kimba, Jean Bolikango, incumbent Prime Minister Joseph Ileo, Barthélémy Mukenge, and Cleophas Kamitatu. Antoine Gizenga did not attend. Tshombe said to the press that he had been seeking "certain reassurances" before agreeing to attend. On March 12, the group released the format for the Congolese state as decided at Tananarive. It would be:

A council of states composed of the president of the confederation (Kasa-Vubu) and presidents of member states (Tshombe, Kalonji, etc. . . .) will determine the general internal and international policies of the confederation. An executive body called the coordinating body between states will carry out the council's decisions.

In the new confederation, Leopoldville would shift to be a federal capital. The conference participants also sent a note of protest to the deployment of UN Peacekeepers.

== Aftermath ==
Though the conference was based on nearly unanimous agreement of the outcome, the plan faltered when its drafters returned to the Congo. Of the unique nature of the conference, Crawford Young wrote:

It is astounding that those articles of confederation could have been unanimously accepted by the participants. The Alice-in-Wonderland character of this meeting is above all a commentary on the utter demoralization of the participants at this nadir of Congolese history.The wave of political murders in Elisabethville, Bakwanga, and Stanleyville; the lack of any promising avenue of escape from the political impasse; the cumulative impact of months of disorder and insecurity alone make plausible this momentary surrender.

Antoine Gizenga publicly dismissed the plan for a confederation. He instead voiced support for the existing form of government with Kasa-Vubu as president and himself as the co-equal prime minister, succeeding the delegitimized and assassinated Lumumba. In April, the parties had another conference at Coquilhatville in the Congo. The Coquilhatville discussions rejected the consensus at Tananarive and instead preserved the previous form of government, with additional recognition to the national unity platform of the Lumumbists.
