= Lulua District =

- District
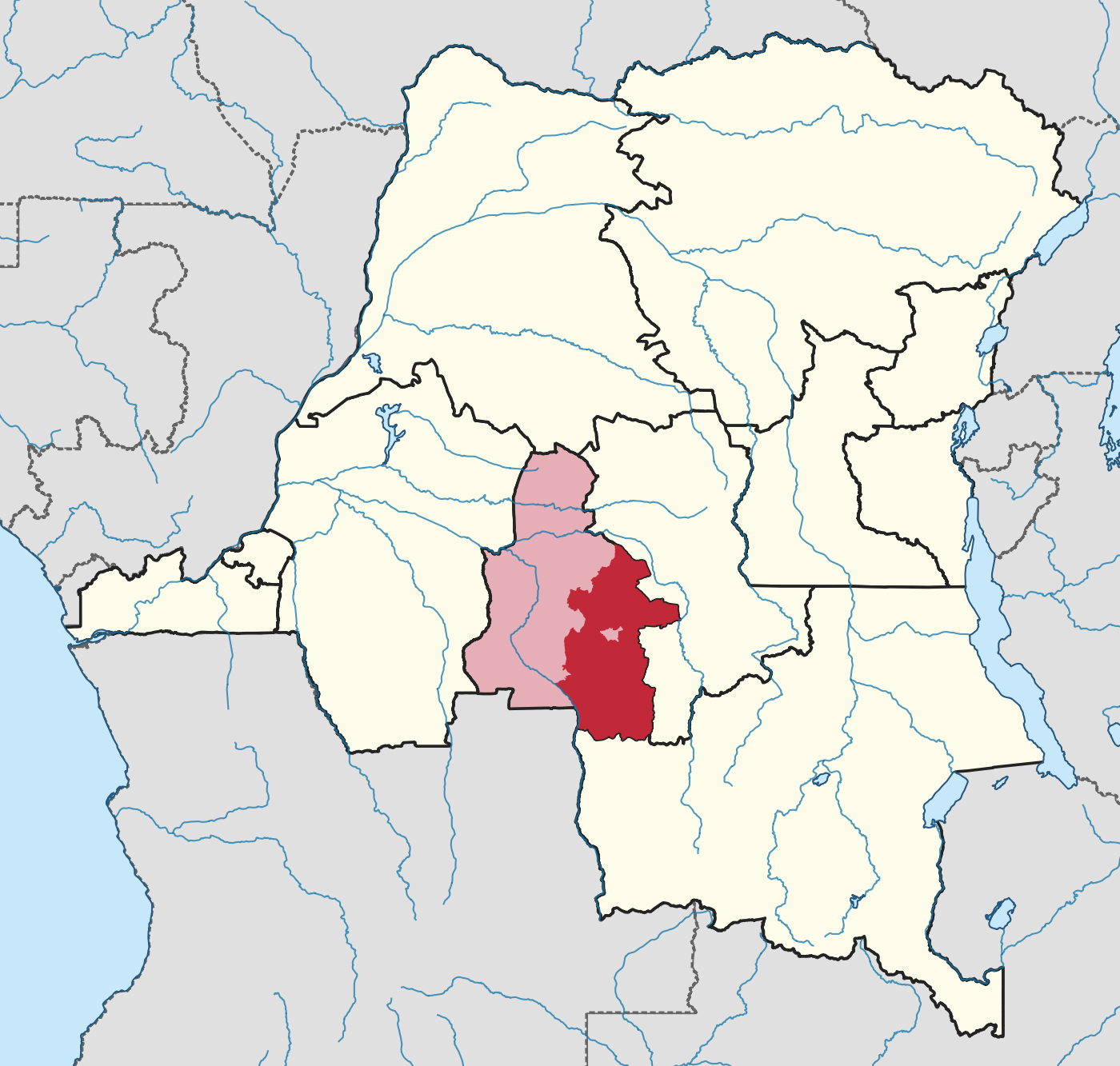
- Lulua district in Kasai-Occidental province (2014)
- Coordinates: 05°54′S 21°27′E
- Country: Democratic Republic of the Congo
- Province: Kasai-Occidental
- District: Lulua

Area
  - Total: 48,100 km^{2} (18,600 sq mi)

Lulua District (French: District de la Lulua) was a district of the Belgian Congo and the Democratic Republic of the Congo. The city of Kananga (formerly known as Luluabourg) was at the center of the district, but had a separate administration. In 2015 Lulua District became the province of Kasaï-Central.

== Territories ==
The district was divided into five territories:

- Demba
- Dibaya
- Dimbelenge
- Kazumba
- Luiza

== History ==
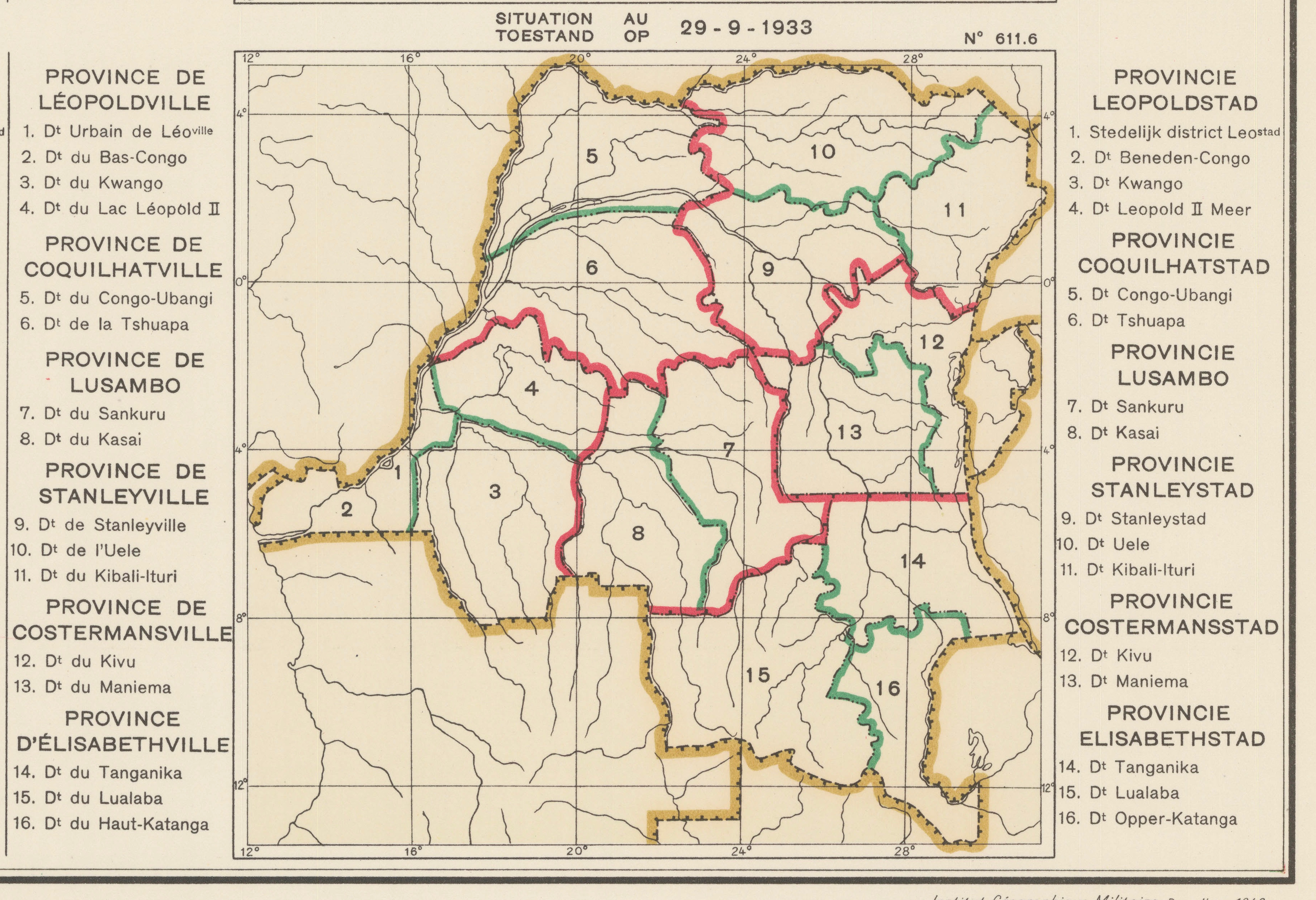
1933 districts before Lulua had been split out from southeast Kasai

In 1933 the original four provinces of the Belgian Congo were reorganized into six provinces, named after their capitals, and the central government assumed more control. Congo-Kasaï province was split, with the eastern part renamed Lusambo Province. The number of districts in the colony was reduced to 15. Lusambo Province contained the districts of Sankuru to the east and Kasai to the west. Lusambo Province was renamed Kasai Province in 1947 and some of the districts were divided up.

A 1955–1957 map shows that Sankuru District had been divided into a smaller Sankuru District to the north and a new Kabinda District to the south, while Kasai District had been divided into a smaller Kasai District to the west and a new Lulua district to the southeast. Lulua District bordered Sankuru District to the north, Kabinda District to the east, Haut-Lomami District to the south, the Portuguese territories to the southwest and Kasai District to the west. The area was 48,100 square kilometres (18,600 sq mi) out of a total of 323,100 square kilometres (124,700 sq mi) for Kasai province as a whole.

Luluabourg province was created in 1962 from the former Kasai Province. It was incorporated into Kasai-Occidental in 1966 under the Mobutu regime. Presidents (from 1965, governors) of Luluabourg province were

- September 1962 - September 1963 François Luakabwanga (1st time)
- September 1963 - 25 September 1964 André Lubaya (d. 1968)
- 25 September 1964 - December 1965 François Luakabwanga (2nd time)
- January 1966 - 18 April 1966 Constantin Tshilumba
- 18 April 1966 - 25 April 1966 François Luakabwanga (3rd time)

Lulua was one of 25 new provinces specified in the country's Constitution (effective 18 February 2006). Lulua District would be combined with the city of Kananga to form the new province, and Kananga would be the capital. This was completed in 2015, forming the new province of Kasaï-Central.

== Sources ==
- Atlas général du Congo / Algemene atlas van Congo (in French and Dutch), Belgium: Institut Royal Colonial Belge, 1948–1963, OCLC 681334449
- Brass, William (8 December 2015), Demography of Tropical Africa, Princeton University Press, ISBN 978-1-4008-7714-0
- Bruneau, Jean-Claude (30 June 2009), "Les nouvelles provinces de la République Démocratique du Congo : construction territoriale et ethnicités", L'Espace Politique, 7 (2009–1), doi:10.4000/espacepolitique.1296, archived from the original on 2020-08-20
- "Constitution de la République démocratique du Congo: Article 2". Wikisource. Archived from the original on 2011-10-25.
- Lemarchand, René (1964), Political Awakening in the Belgian Congo, University of California Press, GGKEY:TQ2J84FWCXN, archived from the original on 21 May 2024
- Omasombo Tshonda, Jean (2015), Mongala : Jonction des territoires et bastion d'une identité supra-ethnique (PDF), Musée royal de l’Afrique centrale, ISBN 978-9-4922-4416-1, archived (PDF) from the original on 2020-10-26
- "RDC : le Kasaï-Occidental démembré", Radio Okapi (in French), 18 July 2015, archived from the original on 13 August 2015
