= Henri De Jaegher =

Belgian cyclist (1893–1970)

Personal information
- Born: 7 November 1893 Lovendegem, Belgium
- Died: 7 October 1970 (aged 76)

Cycling career
- Sport: Cycling
- Role: Rider

Henri De Jaegher (7 November 1893 – 7 October 1970) was a Belgian racing cyclist. He rode in the 1922 Tour de France.
