= Kasaï region =

Region of the Democratic Republic of Congo

- Historical region
- Etymology: Kasai River
- Map of the former province of Kasaï
- Country: Democratic Republic of the Congo
- Provinces: Kasaï Province, Kasaï-Central, Sankuru, Kasaï-Oriental, Lomami Province

Area
  - Total: 325,433 km^{2} (125,650 sq mi)

Population (2017)
  - Total: 13,816,000 (est.)
  - Density: 42.454/km^{2} (109.96/sq mi)
- Demonym: Kasaians
- Largest City: Mbuji-Mayi
- Languages: French, Tshiluba

The Kasaï region (also referred to as the Greater Kasaï region, Greater Kasaï, Grand Kasaï, or simply Kasaï) is a geographic and cultural region in south-central Democratic Republic of the Congo. Once a single province, it now comprises the provinces of Kasaï Province, Kasaï-Central, Sankuru, Kasaï-Oriental, and Lomami Province. It shares its name with the Kasai River.

Historically, the Kasaï region has been a stronghold for the Union for Democracy and Social Progress (UDPS) party. As an opposition stronghold, it experienced both political and economic marginalization by the central government. This long-running resentment of the central government's remoteness and corruption exploded into a rebellion, triggered by the official rejection of a local chief, Kamwina Nsapu, who in August 2016 was killed by security forces. After UDPS candidate Félix Tshisekedi's victory in the 2018 presidential election, most militia members surrendered and returned to their communities of origin.

Until 2015 Kasai region was divided administratively into two provinces, Kasai-Occidental and Kasai-Oriental. After 2015, the former Districts within these provinces were in some cases combined with cities that had been independently administered, and their status was elevated to the five current provinces.

== History ==
=== Pre-Bantu residence ===
Not much is known of pre-Bantu residence in the region, although it is likely that Pygmies once dwelled in Kasai.

=== Belgian colonization ===
Belgian rule in Kasai, post-Leopold, eventually saw the consolidation of the region as a single political unit. In 1919, Bas-Congo, Moyen-Congo, Kasaï, Kwango and Sankuru districts (out of 22 districts created in the Belgian Congo) were merged into Congo Kasai, one of four provinces created that year. In 1933 Kasaï and Sankuru (the two eastern districts of the former vice government general of Congo-Kasaï) and parts of the districts of Léopold II (in Equateur) and Lomami (in Katanga) were separated to form the new Congolese province of Lusambo (after 1947, Kasai); in turn, Bas-Congo, Kwango, Léopoldville and the major part of Lake Léopold II became the new province of Léopoldville.

In 1957, the capital of Kasai was moved from Lusambo to Luluabourg.

=== End of Belgian rule ===
In 1960, the Democratic Republic of the Congo declared independence from Belgium. However, it was beset by a number of secessions and bitter civil war.

=== Secession of South Kasai ===
The South Kasai region sought independence in similar circumstances to neighboring Katanga during the Congo Crisis. Ethnic conflicts and political tensions between leaders of the central government and local leaders plagued the diamond-rich region. On 14 June 1960, days before the colony was to become independent, officials declared the independence of Kasai (not of Congo) and proclaimed the Federal State of South Kasai. On 8 August 1960, the autonomous Mining State of South Kasai was proclaimed with its capital at Bakwanga. Albert Kalonji was named president of South Kasai and Joseph Ngalula was appointed head of government. Lumumba was determined to quickly subdue the renegade provinces of Kasai and Katanga. Dissatisfied with the UN, Lumumba followed through on his threat to request military assistance from the Soviet Union, who responded with an airlift of Congolese troops to invade Kasai. A bloody campaign ensued causing the deaths of hundreds of Baluba tribesmen and the flight of a quarter of a million refugees. Lumumba's decision to accept Soviet help angered the US, who via the CIA increasingly supported Mobutu and Kasa-Vubu.

=== Congolese forces re-conquer South Kasai ===
On December 30, 1961, after a four-month military campaign, troops of the Congolese central government re-conquered South Kasai and arrested Kalonji, thus ending the South Kasai secession.

=== Post civil war ===
Under the subsequent regime of Joseph Mobutu (Mobutu Sese Seko), the former South Kasai was divided to discourage separatist sentiment or activity; most of the territory was allocated to Kasai-Oriental, while the rest of the historic Kasai region was renamed Kasai-Occidental.

=== Post Mobutu ===
In 2006, the new Constitution re-divided the region into five new provinces:

- Kasai oriental
- Lomami
- Sankuru
- Kasai
- Lulua

In 2007, two cases of the Ebola haemorrhagic fever were announced in the region.

=== 2017 rebellion ===
In spring 2017, long-running resentment of central government's remoteness and corruption exploded into a rebellion, triggered by official rejection of a local chief, Kamwina Nsapu, who in August was killed by security forces. In the fighting that followed, nearly 1.4 million people were displaced, among them around 850,000 children, leading to a hunger crisis across the region as subsistence farmers were unable to plant crops.
