= Joseph Ngalula =

Congolese writer and politician

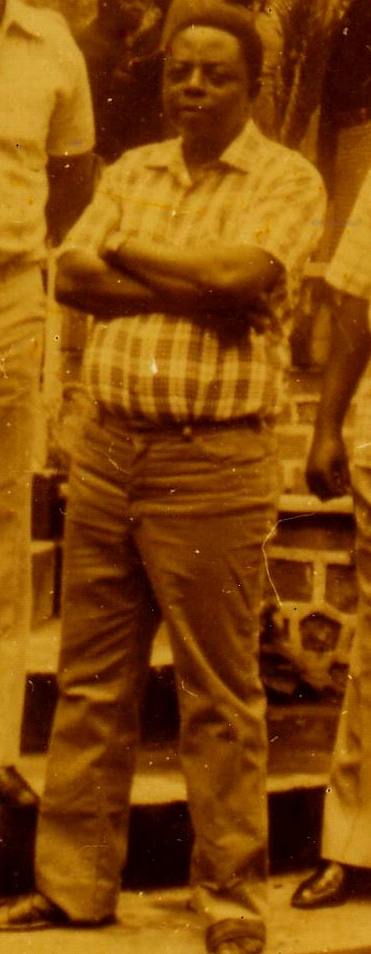
- Joseph Ngalula in the 1980s

Minister of Education of the Republic of the Congo
- In office August 1961 – April 1963
- Prime Minister: Cyrille Adoula

Personal details
- Born: 12 December 1928 Lusambo, Belgian Congo

Joseph Ngalula Mpandajila (born 12 December 1928) was a Congolese writer and politician who played a prominent role in the Kasai secession of the early 1960s.

== Biography ==
Joseph Ngalula was born on 12 December 1928 in Lusambo, Belgian Congo to a Baluba family. He undertook six years of primary education and five years of professional courses. He was fluent in English and French. He served as editor of the publication Presence Congolaise, a weekly paper written by and for the Congolese population, which was placed as an insert within Le Courrier d'Afrique. In June 1960 Barthélemy Mukenge was elected President of Kasai Province by the provincial assembly. Unhappy with the results, on 14 June the assembly opposition declared their own provincial government under Ngalula. On 16 June 1960 Ngalula was appointed Kasai Minister of Economic Affairs by Mukenge without consultation. On 9 August Albert Kalonji declared that the south-eastern region of the province was seceding to form the Autonomous State of South Kasai and appointed Ngalula its Prime Minister.

In July 1961 the relationship between the two deteriorated, and Ngalula was driven into exile. Since he had been the person chiefly responsible for the organisation of the state, South Kasai's administration broke down following his departure. He subsequently established his own political party, the Democratic Union, to oppose the Kalonjists. In August 1961 he was appointed Minister of Education under Prime Minister Cyrille Adoula. He held the post until April 1963.

Ngalula was one of the Members of Parliament who signed an open letter to Zaire's President Mobutu Sese Seko in 1980. Later, he co-founded the opposition party UDPS, together with Étienne Tshisekedi, Marcel Lihau, and others. Because of his engagement in the political opposition to Mobutu, he was imprisoned, banished, and pardoned several times.

There exists confusion over Ngalula's fate. According to some sources, he died on 5 February 2001 from a heart attack. Despite this, Emizet François Kisangani's historical dictionary of the Congo claims that Ngalula went on to be elected to the Senate in 2007. However, in a more recent edition of the same work, Kisangani omits this and instead states that Ngalula already died in 1990.
