= Paul Ermens =

Belgian colonial official

Paul-Charles Ermens
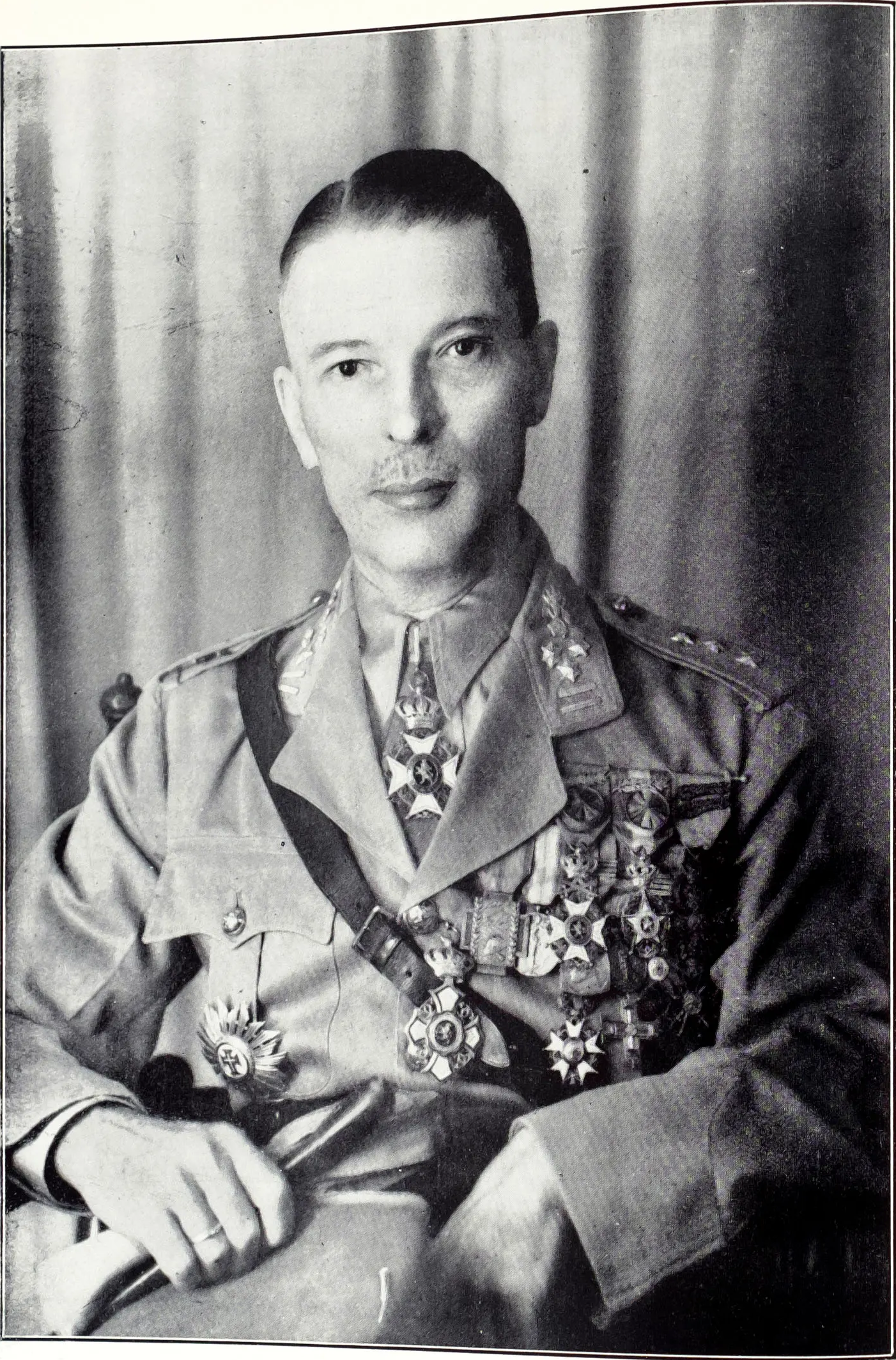
- Born: June 8, 1884; Brussels, Belgium.
- Died: November 1, 1957 (aged 73); Brussels, Belgium.
- Military career
- Allegiance: Belgium; Belgian Congo
- Branch: Force Publique
- Rank: Lieutenant general
- Conflicts: World War I; East African campaign; World War II; Siege of Saïo
- Awards: Commemorative Medal of the 1914–1917 African Campaigns

Governor of Congo-Kasaï
- In office 17 August 1932 – 30 September 1933
- Preceded by: Joseph Beernaert
- Succeeded by: Constant Wauters

Paul-Charles Ermens (June 8, 1884 – November 1, 1957) was a senior Force Publique officer, Vice-governor general of the Belgian Congo and Commander of the Force Publique. His most famous post was when he served as the commander of the Force Publique in World War II.

== Career ==
He graduated in 1903 from the Belgian Royal Military Academy and joined the Royal grenadiers regiment. In 1914 he was an officer in the Force Publique, on August 4, 1914, he was promoted to Captain-commandant. He commanded the 3rd battalion of the Force Publique in the East African Campaign (World War I), for his service he was awarded the title of knight in the Order of the African Star. In 1918 he became Commander of the Force Publique in East Africa. In 1925 he became General and was appointed as commander of the Force Publique. In 1930 he didn't agree with the plans to reform the Force Publique and returned to Belgium. In 1932 he was appointed as vice-governor general of the Belgian Congo and governor of Congo-Kasaï, and became the assistant of governor general Pierre Ryckmans. During World War II he was appointed as Lieutenant general and Commander of the Force Publique. After the war he was reappointed as vice-governor general until the end of his career.

== Honors and awards ==
- Order of Leopold, rank Grand Officer (Belgium)
- Order of the Crown, rank Commander (Belgium)
- Order of the African Star, rank Grand Officer (Belgian Congo)
- Royal Order of the Lion, rank Commander (Belgian Congo)
- Belgian War Cross 1940-1945 with Palm
- Belgian War Cross 1914-1918 with Palm
- Legion of Honour, rank Officer (France)
- Order of the Bath, rank Knight (United Kingdom)
- Distinguished Service Order (United Kingdom)
- Military Order of Christ, rank Commander (Portugal)
- Order of St. Sylvester, rank Commander (Vatican)
- Commemorative Medal of the 1914–1917 African Campaigns
- 1940–1945 African War Medal
