= Luluabourg Province =

Former province of the Democratic Republic of the Congo

Coordinates: 05°53.82′S 22°26.93′E

Luluabourg Province was created in 1962 from Kasai province. It was incorporated into Kasai-Occidental Province in 1966 under the Mobutu regime. It was recreated as the Lulua Province in 2009. It was named after its main city, Luluabourg, which is now known as Kananga.

Presidents (from 1965, governors) of Luluabourg province were:

- September 1962 – September 1963, François Luakabwanga (1st time)
- September 1963 – 25 September 1964, André Lubaya (d. 1968)
- 25 September 1964 – December 1965, François Luakabwanga (2nd time)
- January – 18 April 1966, Constantin Tshilumba
- 18 – 25 April 1966, François Luakabwanga (3rd time)

== See also ==
- Kasaï-Central, the current province that corresponds to the Luluabourg Province
