= Dibaya Territory =

Dibaya
- Territory
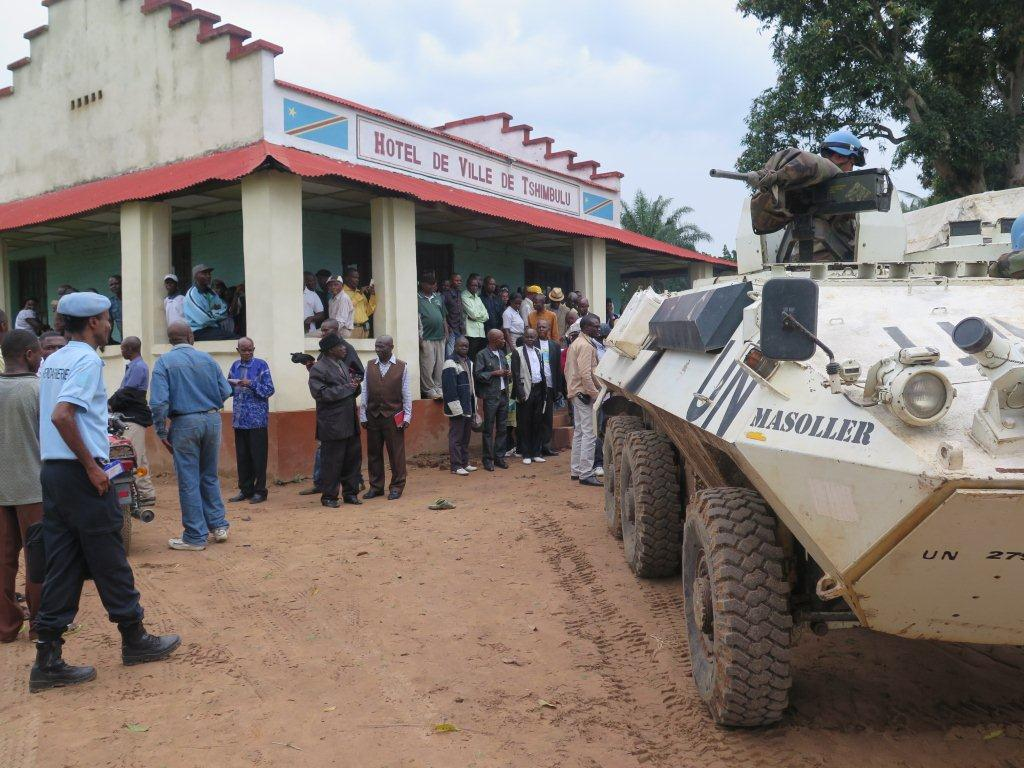
- Tshimbulu, Central Kasai. South East of Kananga in Tshimbulu, MONUSCO reaffirms its commitment to promoting dialogue
- Interactive map of Dibaya
- Country: DR Congo
- Province: Kasaï-Central

Area
  - Total: 7,605 km^{2} (2,936 sq mi)

Population
  - Total: 1,115,025
  - Density: 146.6/km^{2} (379.7/sq mi)
- Time zone: UTC+2 (CAT)

Dibaya is a territory in Kasai-Central province of the Democratic Republic of the Congo.
