= Lulua people =

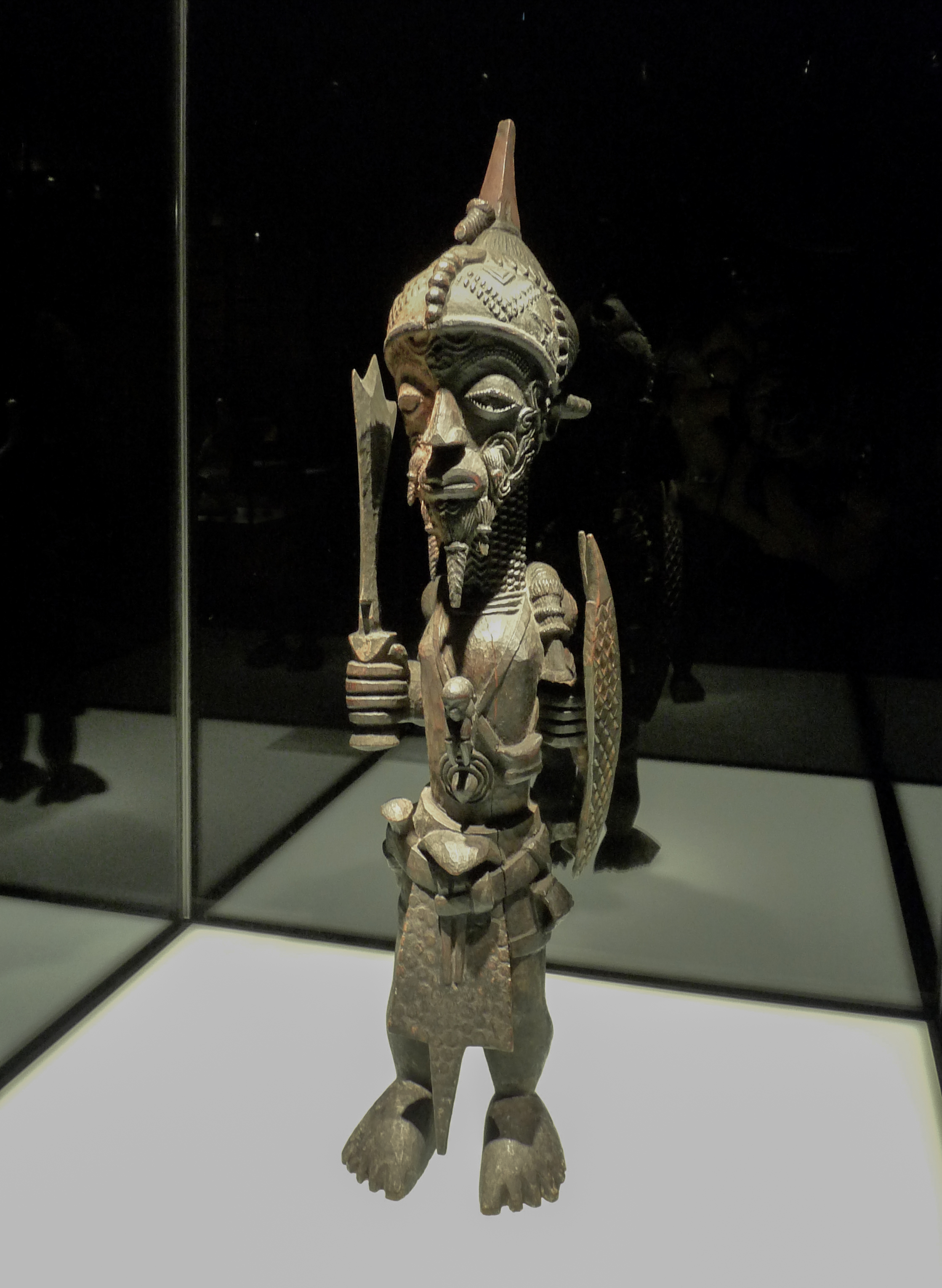
A 19th century statue of a Lulua war chief, Ethnologisches Museum Berlin.

The Lulua people are a Bantu ethnic group settled along the Lulua River valley in south central Kasai-Occidental province, Democratic Republic of the Congo. The Lulua are in fact a collection of small groups whose home bordered by the larger Luba state and the related Songye people and Chokwe people, with whom they share a very similar culture, history, and language.

Lulua lands are bordered on the south by other small ethnic groups, including the Mbagani, Lwalwa, Southern Kete, and the Salampasu. Rural Lulua remain mostly farmers.

== History of Lulua identity ==
The name Lulua seems to have appeared in the last quarter of the 19th century, previously these groups simply being ethnically Luba people outside the Luba (or Baluba) political structure. Georges Nzongola-Ntalaja, in his history of Congo, describes the history Lulua ethnicity as an invented ethnicity.

There is no better example of the invention of ethnicity or, in other words, of how artificial ethnic identities can be than the Lulua--Baluba conflict. [p.103]

In fact, the Lulua share language, matrilineal inheritance, and many other cultural traits with the Luba people and the Kondji or Luntu peoples. All three have been considered subgroups of the Luba, tracing their origins back to the Luba empire based in Katanga.

In the 19th century, the Chokwe—another related group—identified a disparate collection of neighboring farming and hunting groups in the area between the Upper and Lower Kasai and Lulua Rivers as the "Beena Luluwa" (singular, "Mwena Luluwa") meaning "people by the Luluwa." The powerful Luba empire in the 18th century helped push these small Luba hunting groups into their present home, according to oral sources, coming from the west. Their collective identity was limited to the institution of the "Kalamba", a judge and war leader to whom these small groups turned to in times of internal or external conflict. Nineteenth century European missionaries and travelers contributed to this process of ethnic differentiation from the Luba, defining these small communities in contradistinction to the states of their neighbors. Father A. Van Zandijcke, a Belgian missionary, reported that until 1870 there was no agreed collective name for the Lulua, with each kinship group or chieftaincy identifying themselves independently. By the first decade of the 20th century, the coming of Belgian colonialism along with pressure from the Luba empire and other neighbors, began to develop a Lulua collective identity.

Land disputes with neighbors helped lend a both a collective identity as well as feeding ethnic conflict, as did the Belgian colonial policy of formalising a "kingship", in the style of their neighbors, for the Lulua. The tensions of the late colonial period finally culminated it what has been called the "Lulua--Baluba War", as communal violence exploded on 11 October 1959.

== The Lulua–Baluba War ==
During the Congo Crisis at independence, there were violent conflicts with other ethnic groups, especially in the area of Kananga/Luluabourg's large self identified Lulua community. In the late 19th century, Baluba demographic pressures drove Lulua groups into what became the Belgian colonial area of Luluabourg, later Kananga. From the 1920s, Baluba farmers from South Kasi began relocating again into more fertile Lulua lands in Kananga. Following the Second World War, Belgium began to grant some limited forms of local self-government to the Congolese. At the same time, educated Lulua, concerned by the relative political power of the Luba/Baluba ruling classes led by Sylvian Mangole Kalamba, formed an ethnic educational and political group called The Lulua Brothers (Lulua Freres) to pressure the colonial authorities. In December 1957, Baluba candidates won a number of municipal elections in Luluabourg, raising fears from Lulua elites that they were being displaced. Mobilizing politically around their Lulua identity, Lulua leaders swept the 1960 legislative elections for the provincial parliament. The Lulua led administration then proposed a plan to evict 100,000 ethnic Baluba farmers back to South Kasai. Ethnic based riots broke out in response on 11 October and escalated. This violence fed into already brewing political split between Lumumba's Congo nationalist MNC versus regionalists Albert Kalonji from Kasai and Moise Tshombe, president of Katanga Province, was a precipitant of the South Kasai secession of the Congo Crisis. In Lulua territories, central government troops and United Nation peacekeepers were rushed in to quell violence. These areas became the frontline for government forces, sandwiched as it was between both the South Kasai and the Katanga secessionist states. When order was finally reestablished in the Lulua majority area in February 1962, some 3000 to 7000 were dead in both communal violence and military action. The Congo Crisis would burn on until November 1966.

== Arts ==
Lulua arts are highly prized in the international collectors market. Lulua carved wood figures are identified with distinctive and extensive portrayal of scarification patterns (despite the fact that Lulua scarification traditions largely died out in the 19th century).

Carved figures serve a number of spiritual and decorative roles and are known for their refined artistry, while Lulua wooden masks are confined to secret society rituals and are made to be disposed after use.

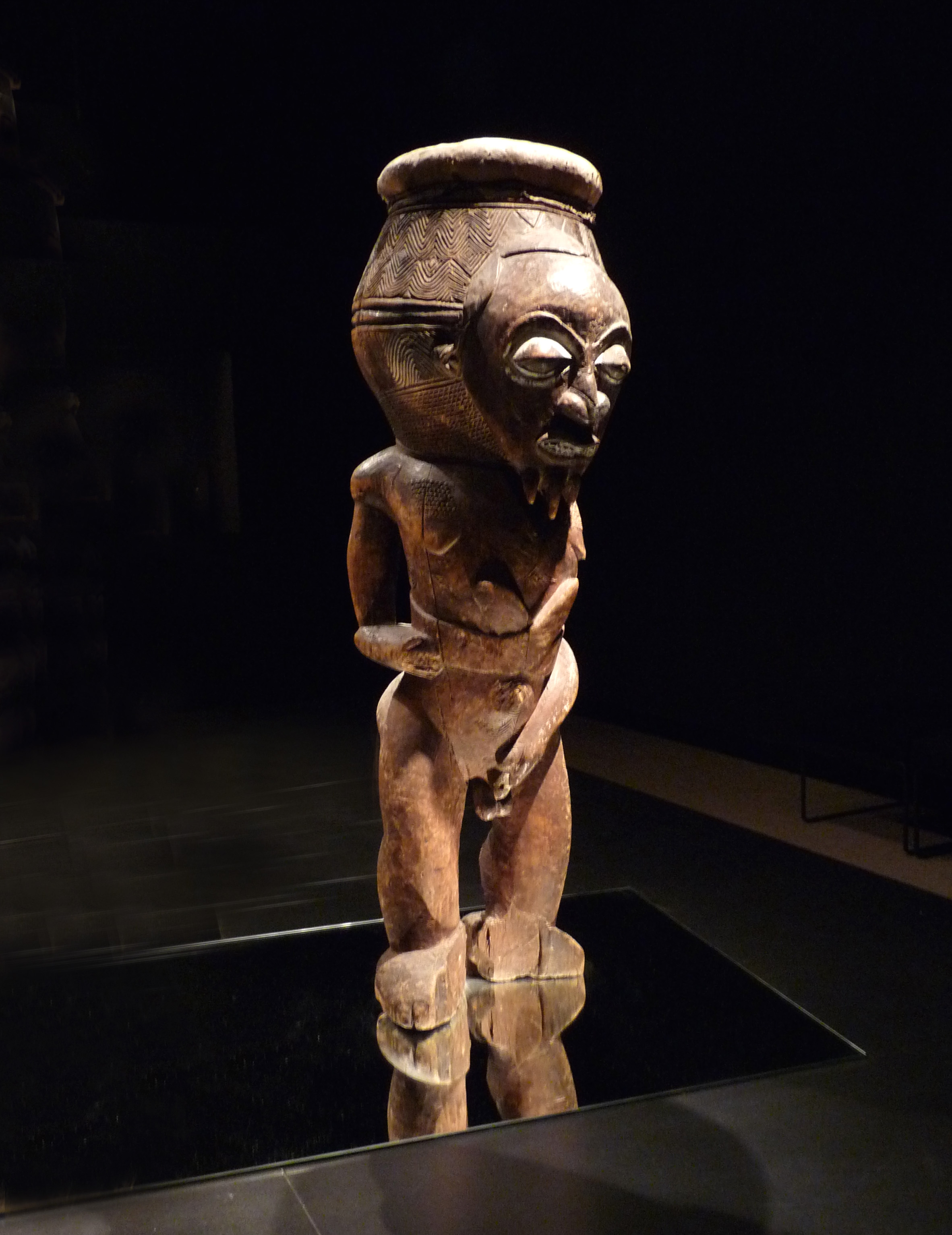
Tambour (Ethnological Museum of Berlin)

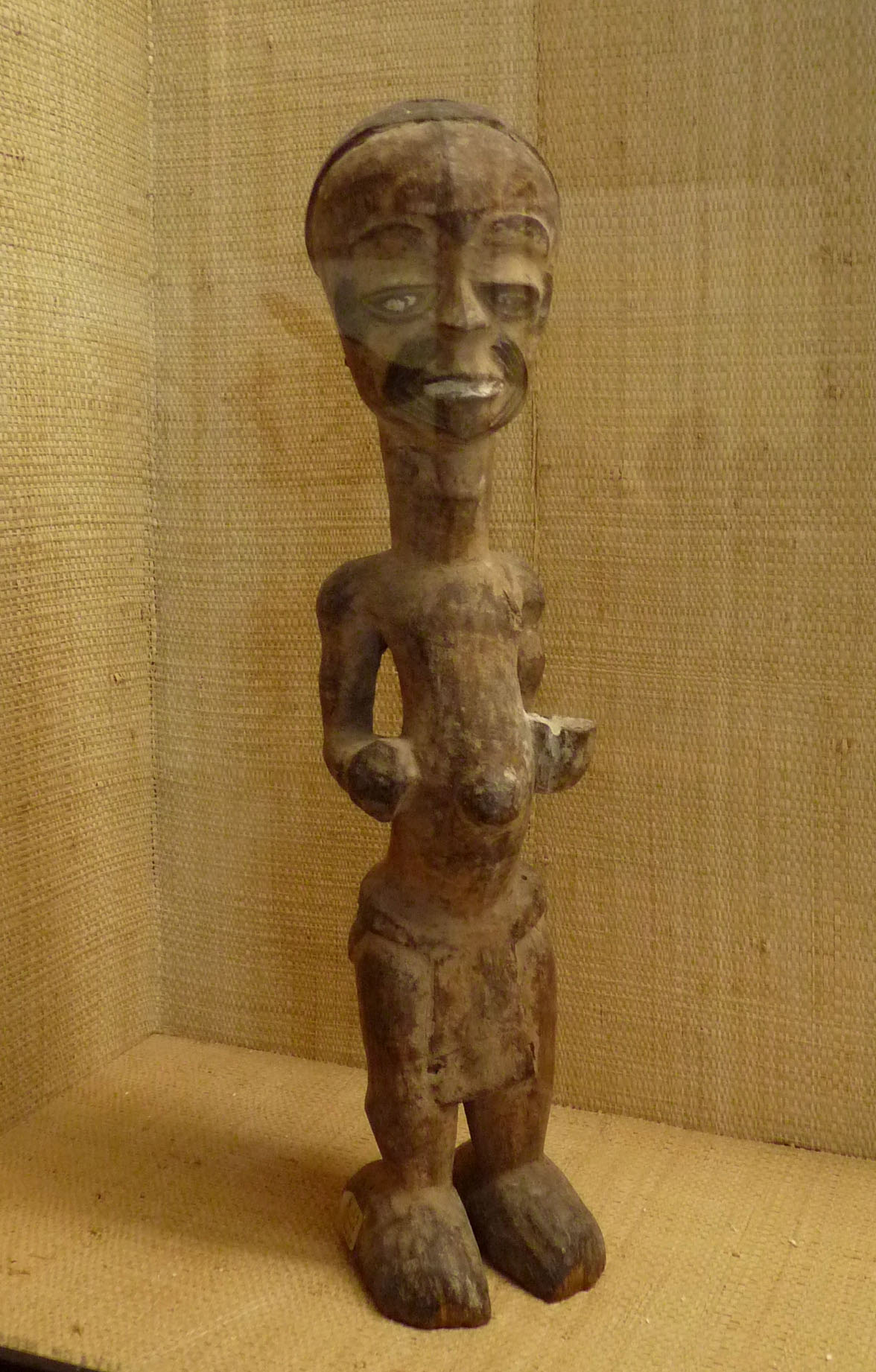
Statuette (Musée africain de l'île d'Aix)

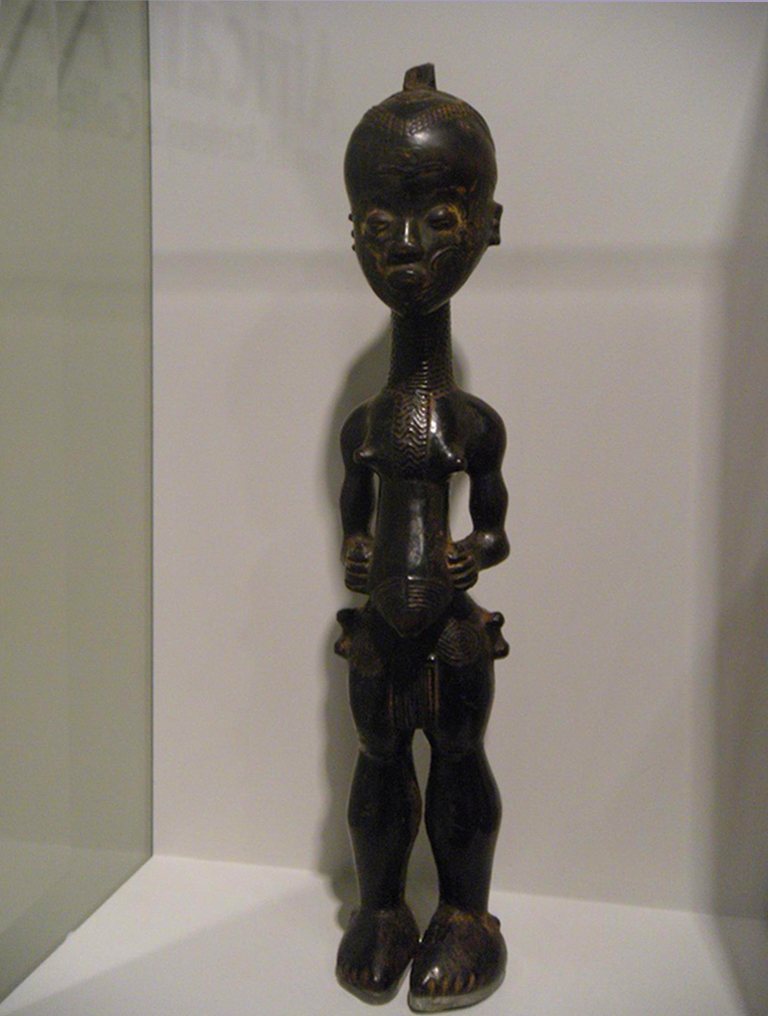
Female Figure, Democratic Republic of the Congo, Bena Lulua people, 19th century
