= Kasai-Occidental =

Kasaï-Occidental Kasai Wa Mubuelu
- Former province of the Democratic Republic of the Congo
- Seal

- Coordinates: 05°54′S 22°27′E
- Country: Democratic Republic of the Congo
- Region: Kasai region
- Established: 25 April 1966
- Dissolved: 2015
- Capital: Kananga
- Largest city: Kananga
- Districts: Lulua District, Kasaï District: 2 Cities: Kananga, Tshikapa; 10 Territories

Government
  - Body: Government of Kasaï-Occidental
  - Governor: Alex Kande Mupompa
  - Legislature: Provincial Assembly of Kasai-Occidental
  - Type: Unicameral

Area
  - Total: 154,742 km^{2} (59,746 sq mi)
  - Rank: 5th

Population (2010 est.)
  - Total: 5,366,068
  - Rank: 8th
  - Density: 34.6775/km^{2} (89.8144/sq mi)
- Demonym: Kasaian

Languages
  - Official: French
  - National: Tshiluba
- Time zone: UTC+02:00 (Congo eastern time)
- HDI (2019): 0.401; Low11th

Kasaï-Occidental (French for "Western Kasai"; Luba-Lulua: Kasai Wa Mubuelu) was one of the eleven provinces of the Democratic Republic of the Congo between 1966 and 2015, when it was split into the Kasaï-Central and the Kasaï provinces.

== History ==
The province of Kasaï-Occidental was established in 1966 by regrouping the provinces of Luluabourg and Unité Kasaïenne which in turn were created 1962 when the historical Kasaï Province was divided in five provinces namely Lomami, Sankuru, Sud-Kasai, Luluabourg, Unité-Kasaïenne. The former provinces of Luluabourg and Unité-Kasaïenne correspond to the current districts of Lulua District and Kasaï District. Since its formation the provincial seat is Kananga (formerly Luluabourg) which was also the seat of the Kasaï Province between 1957 and 1962. The Province of Lusambo precedes the current entity, it was created 1933 by carving out the districts of Kasai and Sankuru from the Province of Congo-Kasaï, one of the four provinces established in 1924. The province of Lusambo changed its name to Kasaï Province in 1947 its provincial seat was still Lusambo until 1957 when it was moved to Luluabourg (now Kananga). The Province of Kasai existed until it was subdivided in 1962 into 5 provinces.

The Province derives its name from the Kasai River which flows through the Kasaï District from south to north. The river is the second longest in DR. Congo and a major tributary of the Congo River. The Kasaï river was variously called Enzzadi, Nsadi, Nzadi, Kassabi, Kasye, Kassaba by the different local tribes (Luba, Tshokwe, Lunda, etc..), latter European explorers came to use the name Kasaï to refer to the river.

== Geography ==
Kasaï-Occidental borders the provinces of Bandundu to the west, Équateur to the north, Kasai-Oriental to the east, and Katanga to the southeast. To the south it borders the country of Angola. The province is crossed by many major rivers: Kasai, Lulua, Loango, Sankuru, Lukeni, etc...

== Divisions ==
The province is divided into the Kasaï and Lulua districts, with their headquarters in the towns of Luebo and Tshimbulu. Cities with independent administrations are Kananga in the Lulua district and Tshikapa in the Kasai district. The Kasai district is divided in five territories:

Kamonia Territory seat Kamonia and is further divided in nine sectors:

- Bakwa-Nyambi
- Bapende
- Kasai-Kabambayi
- Kasai-Longotshimo
- Kasai-Lunyeka
- Kasadisadi
- Lovua-Longotshimo
- Lovua-Lushiku
- Tshikapa

The tshikapa sector should not be confused with the city of Tshikapa which is administered independently

Luebo Territory seat Luebo, divided in five sectors:

- Luebo
- Luebo-Kabambayi
- Luebo-Lulengele
- Luebo-Wedi
- Ndjoko-Punda

Mweka Territory seat Mweka; the entire territory is covered by one sector that of Bakuba.

Ilebo Territory seat Ilebo, divided in four sectors:

- Basongo
- Malu-Malu
- Mapangu
- Sud-Banga

Dekese territory seat Dekese, divided in two sectors:

- Ndengese-ikolombe
- Yaelima

Cities and towns, with their 2010 populations, are:

| Name | Pop. 2010 | Coordinates |
|---|---|---|
| Dekese | 3,241 | 3°27′S 21°24′E |
| Demba | 21,019 | 5°31′S 22°16′E |
| Dibaya | 3,857 | 6°31′S 22°52′E |
| Dimbelenge | 3,815 | 5°33′S 23°07′E |
| Ilebo | 72,059 | 4°19′S 20°37′E |
| Kabeya-Kamwanga | 30,027 | 6°16′S 22°38′E |
| Kananga | 967,007 | 5°53′S 22°24′E |
| Kazumba | 4,109 | 6°25′S 22°02′E |
| Luebo | 29,167 | 5°21′S 21°25′E |
| Luiza | 15,259 | 7°12′S 22°25′E |
| Mankanza | 18,134 | 7°24′S 22°40′E |
| Mweka | 55,155 | 4°50′S 21°34′E |
| Tshikapa | 524,293 | 6°25′S 20°46′E |
| Tshimbulu | 19,384 | 6°29′S 22°51′E |

Under the 2006 constitution, Kasaï-Occidental was to have been divided into two provinces by 18 February 2009. Kasai District and the city of Tshikapa were to combine and become a new Kasai Province, and Lulua District would be combined with the city of Kananga to form the new Lulua Province. As of 24 May 2014, this had not taken place.

== Demographic ==
=== Languages ===
French is the official language. Tshiluba also known as the Luba-Kasai language is spoken by about 6.3 million people in the Kasai region. It is the primary spoken language in the province and it is natively spoken in the cities of Kananga and Tshikapa, also in the Demba territory, dimbelenge territory (Except the Lukibu sector), Dibaya territory (except the Tshishilu sector), Kazumba territory (except the Kavula, Bashi-mboyi, and Tshitadi sectors) in Kamonia territory (Except the Bapende, Lovua-Lushiku, lovua-longatshimo, and Kasai-Longatshimo sectors), and in the Luebo territory (except some area in the northwest on the town of lwebo). Tshiluba is used as a first or second language in many towns outside its native area notably in the towns of Luebo, mweka, Ilebo, Kakenge, Luiza, Kamonia, etc...

Others natively spoken languages are:

- Lele (Cishilele/Ushilele) is spoken in the Territory of Ilebo except in the south part precisely in the south part of the Sud-Banga Sector.
- Kuba (Bushong, Cikuba) is spoken throughout the Mweka Territory.
- Pende (Gipende) is spoken in the Bapende sector in the Kamonia Territory.
- Wongo in the southern part of the Sud-Banga sector in the Ilebo Territory.
- Lwalwa is spoken in the Kabalekese sector in the Luiza Territory.
- Kete Nord (Cikete) is spoken in the northwest of Luebo territory including the town of luebo (historically, though the current language is Ciluba); in some parts of the sectors of Luebo-Wedi and Ndjoko-Punda.
- Kete Sud (Cikete) is spoken in the Dibaya Territory exclusively in the Tshishilu sector; also in the Luiza territory in the Bambayi, bushimayi, and Kalunga Sectors.
- Salampasu (Cisalampasu)in the Luiza territory in the sectors of: Lueta, Loatshi, Lusanza, and some part of Kalunga.
- Bindji sud (Mbangani) in the sectors of Kavula, Bashi-Mboyi, and Tshitadi in the Kazumba territory.
- Bindi nord (Cibindji) is spoken in the sector of Lukibu in the Dimbelenge Territory.
- Ngongo in some part of the ndegese-ikolombe sector in the Dekese territory.
- Songomeno is spoken in the southern part of the Dekese territory between the Lukeni and Sankuru rivers.
- Dengese is spoken in the dekese territory in the north beyond the Lukeni river.

=== Religion ===
The major religion is Christianity, with Catholicism being the largest faith.

== See also ==
- List of governors of Kasaï-Occidental
- Kasai-Oriental
- Kasai region
