= Kasaï-Central =

Province of the Democratic Republic of the Congo

Kasaï-Central Province du Kasaï Central (French)
- Province
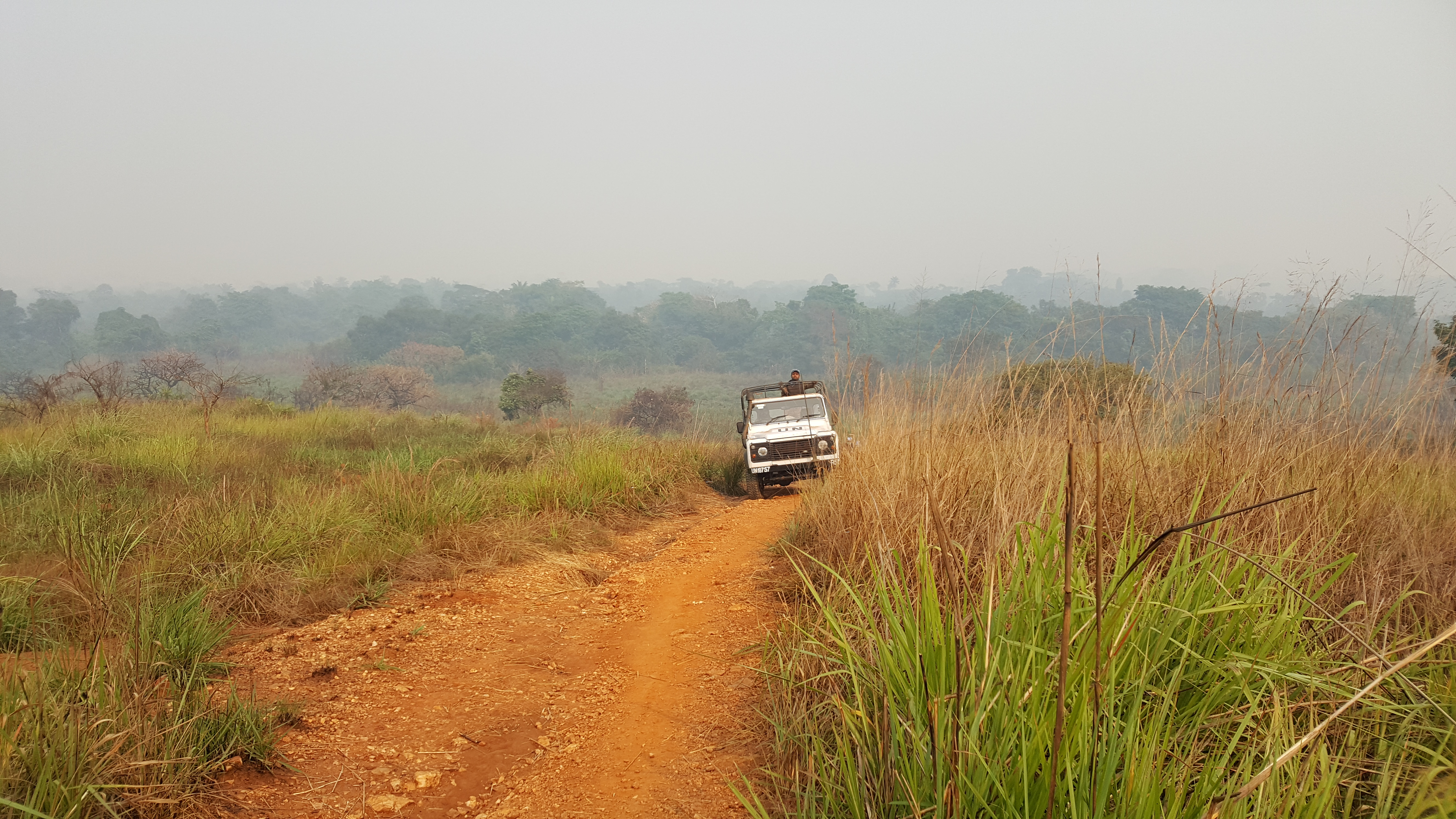
- View of the Congolian Savanna

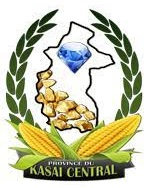
- Seal

- Coordinates: 5°54′S 22°27′E
- Country: Democratic Republic of the Congo
- Created: 2015
- Named after: Kasai River
- Capital: Kananga

Government
  - Governor: Joseph Moïse Kambulu

Area
  - Total: 59,111 km^{2} (22,823 sq mi)
  - Rank: 19th

Population (2024)
  - Total: 4,211,190
  - Rank: 8th
  - Density: 71.242/km^{2} (184.52/sq mi)

Ethnic groups
  - Native: Bakuba • Bena-Lulua • Bakete • Luba-Kasaï (Baluba) • Balwalwa
- Time zone: UTC+2 (Central Africa Time)
- License Plate Code: (Democratic Republic of the Congo) CGO / 15
- Official language: French
- National language: Tshiluba

Kasaï-Central is one of the 21 provinces of the Democratic Republic of the Congo created in the 2015 repartitioning. Kasaï-Central and Kasaï provinces are the result of the dismemberment of the former Kasaï-Occidental province. Kasaï-Central was formed from the Lulua district and the independently administered city of Kananga which retained its status as a provincial capital. The 2024 population was estimated to be 4,211,190.

The new province's territory corresponds to the historic Luluabourg Province which existed in the early period after independence between 1963 and 1966.

== Administration ==
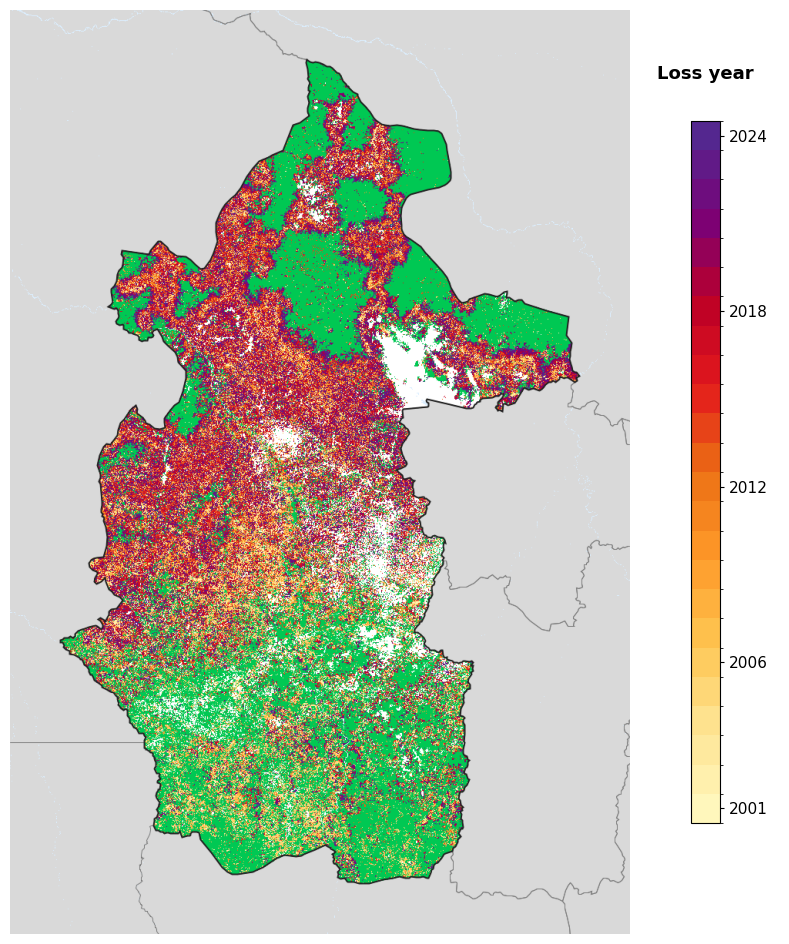
Tree-cover loss year in Kasaï-Central, 2001-2024, from the Global Forest Change dataset.

Kasaï-Central is divided in to five territories and one independently administered city.

Administrative division	Type	Map
Kananga	City	Kananga
Demba	Territory	Demba
Dibaya	Territory	Dibaya
Dimbelenge	Territory	Dimbelenge
Kazumba	Territory	Kazumba
Luiza	Territory	Luiza

== See also ==
- Kasai region
- History of the Kasai region
- Kamwina Nsapu rebellion
