= Kasaï (former province) =

Province of the former Belgian Congo

Kasai, from 1933 to 1960.

Kasai-Occidental

Kasaï Oriental

Kasaï was a province of the Belgian Congo and the successor Republic of the Congo (Léopoldville).

== Location ==
Kasaï was named after the Kasai River, a major left tributary of the Congo River that provides access to the region. By 1910 a factory of the Kasai Company had been established near Misumba, which had about two thousand inhabitants. The company had made successful trial rubber plantations. The company also bought rubber and ivory from the local people, some of whom used it to buy liquor from the Portuguese territory (Angola).

== History ==
In 1914 the Belgian Congo was organized into four large provinces: Congo-Kasai, Équateur, Orientale Province and Katanga. in 1933 they were reorganized into six provinces, named after their capitals, and the central government assumed more control. Congo-Kasai was divided into the new provinces of Léopoldville and Lusambo, named after the city of Lusambo. In 1947 Lusambo Province was renamed to Kasaï.

Kasaï became an autonomous province of the Congo republic on 30 June 1960. On 14 August 1962 Kasaï was divided into five new provinces: Lomami, Luluabourg, Sankuru, Sud-Kasaï and Unité Kasaïenne. On 25 April 1966 Luluabourg and Unité Kasaïenne were united to form Kasaï-Occidental, while Lomami, Sankuru, and Sud-Kasaï were united in the new province of Kasaï-Oriental.

== See also ==
- List of governors of Kasaï (former province)
- History of the Kasai region

== Sources ==
- Bruneau, Jean-Claude (30 June 2009), "Les nouvelles provinces de la République Démocratique du Congo : construction territoriale et ethnicités", L'Espace Politique, 7 (2009–1), doi:10.4000/espacepolitique.1296
- "Congo (Kinshasa) Provinces", Rulers.org
- Torday, E. (July 1910), "Land and Peoples of the Kasai Basin", The Geographical Journal, 36 (1), The Royal Geographical Society (with the Institute of British Geographers): 26–53, doi:10.2307/1777651, JSTOR 1777651
