= Dissolution of the Lumumba Government =

1960 dissolution of the government of Congo-Léopoldville

On 5 September 1960 President Joseph Kasa-Vubu of Congo-Léopoldville (modern Democratic Republic of the Congo) dismissed Prime Minister Patrice Lumumba from office, and six other members of his government: Deputy Prime Minister Antoine Gizenga, Minister of Justice Rémy Mwamba, Minister of Interior Christophe Gbenye, Minister of Information Anicet Kashamura, Secretary of State Antoine-Roger Bolamba, and Secretary of State Jacques Lumbala. This sparked a major constitutional crisis, and led to a coup organized by Colonel Joseph-Désiré Mobutu.

== Background ==
The 37-strong Lumumba Government was very diverse, with its members coming from different classes, different tribes, and holding varied political beliefs. Though many had questionable loyalty to Lumumba, most did not openly contradict him out of political considerations or fear of reprisal. He dominated the Council of Ministers, and most of the ministers did respect his abilities.

MNC-L members controlled eight ministries, including four major portfolios: national defence, interior, economic coordination, and agriculture. Tshombe objected to the fact that the former two were held by MNC-L members, while the majority of PUNA and MNC-K members were extremely displeased that their party leaders had not been included in the government. European circles were displeased that the portfolio for economic affairs, controlled by a CONAKAT ("Confédération des associations tribales du Katanga,", a party committed to securing the autonomy of Katanga Province) member, was undercut by the positioning of nationalists in control of the Ministry and Secretariat for Economic Coordination, and that mines and land affairs were placed under separate portfolios. CONAKAT leader Moïse Tshombe declared that it rendered his agreement to support the government "null and void".

== Prelude ==
By the end of July opposition to the Lumumba Government had solidified in Parliament. Lumumba's absence from the country allowed these elements to organise and advertise their position. Belgian Ambassador Jean van den Bosch had taken advantage of the time to establish contacts with the moderate ministers: Bomboko, Delvaux, Kabangi, Kanza, and Mbuyi. Bomboko became the ambassador's most frequent contact and was relayed messages from Wigny. Van den Bosch also developed a relationship with Joseph Iléo, the President of the Senate, who pledged that he would work in tandem with other senators to remove Lumumba from power. On 9 August Albert Kalonji announced the secession of the "Mining State of South Kasai".

Dissension and subversion campaigns, including the dissemination of anti-Lumumba leaflets and inciting of army mutinies, were organised in Brazzaville with the support of President Fulbert Youlou, Belgian intelligence services, the French Service de Documentation Extérieure et de Contre-Espionnage, and the United States Central Intelligence Agency (CIA). Congolese Secretary of State for the Interior Raphael Batshikama spent two hours every evening in Brazzaville hosting an anti-Lumumba radio programme. Wigny directed the Belgian agents there to encourage the Congolese opposition to remove Lumumba through presidential revocation, as a parliamentary motion of censure was deemed too likely to fail. In a meeting with his advisers on 18 August President Eisenhower suggested that he wanted Lumumba to be killed; the CIA subsequently organised an assassination operation. Belgium made similar plans. By the end of the month rumors were circulating in the capital of Western overtures to Kasa-Vubu to replace Lumumba's government.

Lumumba returned to Congo-Léopoldville on 8 August and soon thereafter met with the Council of Ministers. The following day he proclaimed an état d'exception throughout Congo-Léopoldville, (Note: According to Govender, "Lumumba had always been reluctant to declare a state of emergency, but with the intensification of hostile acts against his regime by Congolese plotters and their Western friends, he felt that a state of emergency would help his poorly equipped security forces and administration to act more effectively against the trouble-makers.") and his government carried out its expulsion order against Ambassador Van den Bosch. Mandi personally informed the ambassador of the direction, but insisted that his ousting did not signify a permanent rupture between Belgium and Congo-Léopoldville. Lumumba soon arrived to oversee Van den Bosch's departure and announced that all other Belgian diplomatic staff would face arrest if they did not leave the country. He also recalled all Congolese students residing in Belgium.

The Prime Minister subsequently issued several orders in an attempt to reassert his dominance on the political scene. The first outlawed the formation of associations without government sanction. A second asserted the government's right to ban publications that produced material likely to bring the administration into disrepute. On 11 August the Courrier d'Afrique printed an editorial which declared that the Congolese did not want to fall "under a second kind of slavery". The editor was summarily arrested and four days later publication of the daily ceased, followed shortly thereafter by the delivery of shut-down orders against the Belga and Agence France-Presse wire services. The press restrictions garnered a wave of harsh criticism from the Belgian media. Another order stipulated that official approval had to be obtained six days in advance of public gatherings. On 16 August Lumumba announced the installation of a régime militaire espécial for the duration of six months, including the establishment of military tribunals. (Note: The government was able to successfully institute the tribunals in only a few locations. The relevant ordinance for the régime militaire was withdrawn on 4 November.) He also initiated the arrest of public figures who opposed him. (Note: On 1 September Bolikango was detained in Gemena on Lumumba's orders, ostensibly for committing secessionist activities and planning assassinations of both Lumumba and Kasa-Vubu, and brought to the capital. This led to demonstrations by his supporters throughout the city on the following day.)

Throughout August Lumumba increasingly withdrew from his full cabinet and instead consulted officials and ministers he trusted, such as Mpolo, Mbuyi, Kashamura, Gizenga, and Kiwewa. Kasa-Vubu's wishes frequently went unheeded by the government. Kasa-Vubu faced criticism from ABAKO and President Youlou for not curbing Lumumba's authoritarian actions. He resisted their pressure, and on 13 August he broadcast an appeal for unity and support for the government. Nevertheless, he cautioned the government against arbitrariness and excess:

If I am under a moral obligation to support and defend the government within the limits set by the law, the members of the government themselves have a duty to work together as a team. Their policy must be the policy of the government and not that of one party, one race, or one tribe. It must be a policy which reflects the interests of the nation and which allows humanitarian values to flourish in freedom. This imperative excludes all feelings of hatred, suspicion, and bad faith towards those who have collaborated loyally with us. It is also the duty of the government to respect the institutions which have been set up and to abide by the normal rules of democratic practice.

== Dismissal of ministers ==
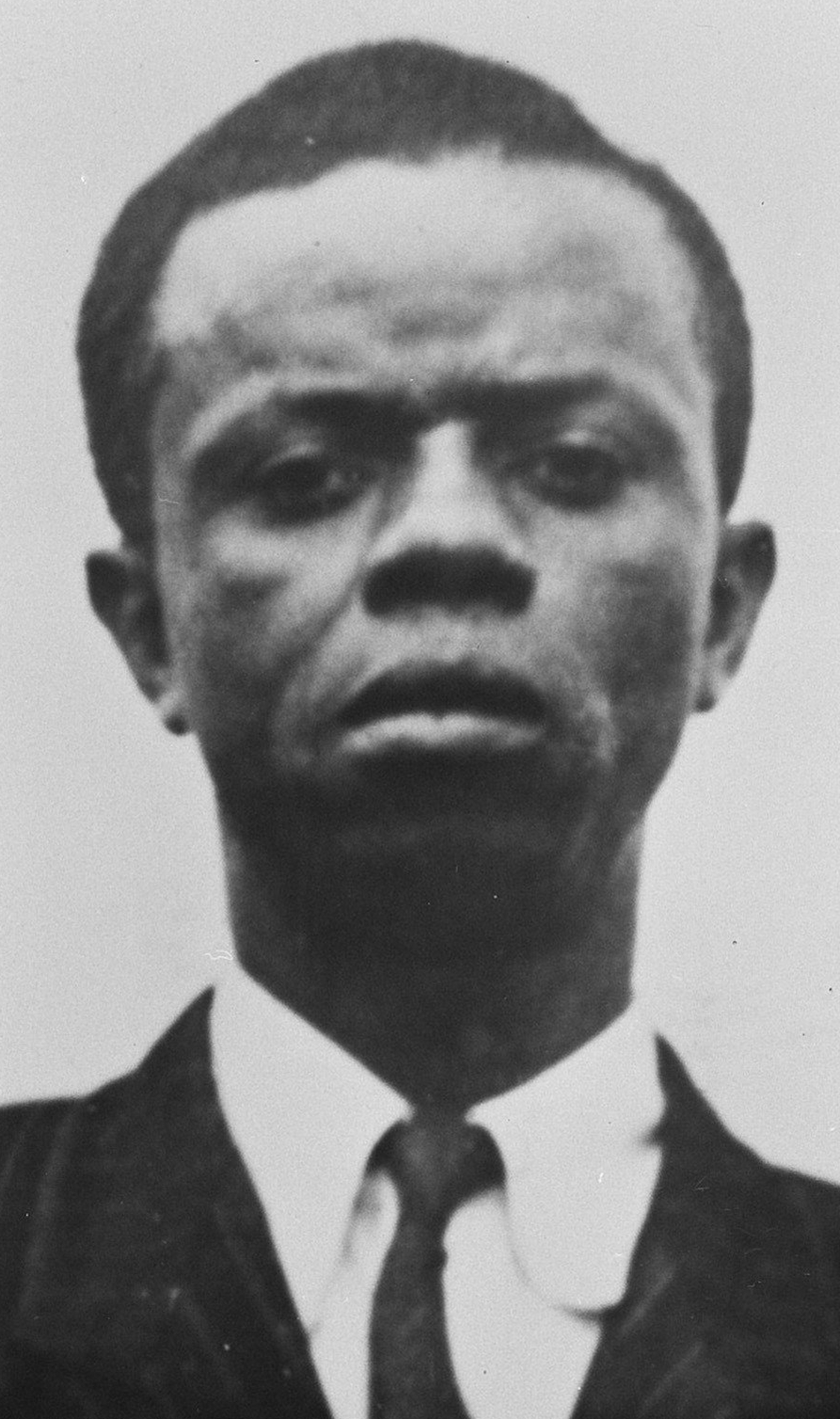
Joseph Iléo, appointed by Kasa-Vubu to replace Lumumba

=== Kasa-Vubu's decision ===
Throughout August President Kasa-Vubu became increasingly bothered by Lumumba's growing authoritarianism, the collapse in administration, and the enlarging prospects of civil war. On 3 September he summoned Andrew Cordier, the interim head of ONUC, to communicate that he was considering dismissing the Prime Minister. Cordier reported the development back to Hammarskjöld, who noted that a "complete disintegration of authority" could follow such an action.

Kasa-Vubu's full motives behind his decision are not agreed upon. He told a parliamentary commission on 9 September that members of the government were becoming authoritarian and complained that he was not consulted in their actions. According to M. Crawford Young, he feared a pro-Lumumba coup d'état would take place and sought to preempt it. Young further stated that there is evidence to suggest that Lumumba was growing impatient with the parliamentary system and was seeking to institute his own centralised presidency to achieve his agenda, but did not begin to formulate such plans until he grew suspicious of his opponents' own intentions to depose him. Political scientist Catherine Hoskyns wrote that Kasa-Vubu was becoming increasingly agitated by Lumumba's style of governance and, facing pressure from ABAKO, Adoula, and Iléo, sought to curtail what he perceived as the Prime Minister's harmful actions. Hoskyns further posited that by dismissing Lumumba, Kasa-Vubu only wished to exercise a measure of control over him and that he was prepared to then negotiate a political compromise with Lumumba that would potentially lead to his inclusion in the next government. According to Stephen Weissman, classified CIA documents indicated that Kasa-Vubu was bribed by the American government into firing Lumumba, as part of a larger plot that would involve a no-confidence vote in Parliament on 8 September rigged by Adoula and Iléo followed by the resignations of all ABAKO and PUNA ministers and public protests. He also wrote, "It appears unlikely that Kasa-Vubu would have gone ahead [with the dismissal] without outside support."

=== Revocation of Lumumba's ministerial mandate ===
At 20:12 on 5 September Kasa-Vubu announced the dismissal of Lumumba, along with Deputy Prime Minister Gizenga, Minister of Justice Mwamba, Minister of Interior Gbenye, Minister of Information Kashamura, Secretary of State Bolamba, and Secretary of State Lumbala over the radio. He stated that the President of the Senate, Joseph Iléo, would form a new government. After Lumumba heard of the firing he held heated discussions with his ministers and made three broadcasts, defending his government and declaring Kasa-Vubu to be deposed. Kasa-Vubu had not declared the approval of any responsible ministers of his decision, making his action legally invalid. (Note: Article 22 of the Loi Fondamentale read, "The President names and revokes the Prime Minister." There was no elaboration on the point, and nowhere else in the document were the nature or limits of the power explained, including whether or not parliamentary approval was necessary. However, it was stipulated that any action undertaken by the President had to be countersigned by a minister responsible to Parliament. This provision was interpreted to extend to Kasa-Vubu's order.) Lumumba noted this in a letter to Hammarskjöld and a radio broadcast at 05:30 on 6 September. Later that day Kasa-Vubu managed to secure the countersignatures of Delvaux and Bomboko to his order. With them, he re-announced his decision at 16:00 over Brazzaville radio. The former's signature was unsurprising to most observers, but the latter's was unanticipated. Through his actions at the UN Security Council meeting he had attended and the Pan-African conference, Bomboko had appeared to concur with Lumumba's programme. (Note: Bomboko may have also been "paid" by United States or Belgian officials at the time.) Bomboko explained to the press in late September that he felt Lumumba had failed to cooperate with the UN and "tolerated" the ANC's harassment of ONUC personnel, "thus disqualifying our young nation in the eyes of the world". He also claimed that Lumumba did not stem the mistreatment of foreigners and bypassed him in seeking bilateral aid outside of the UN effort.

While the dismissals were recognised, the reigning government was, according to Belgian tradition, legally in place until a full administration was formed that could replace it—though Lumumba's opponents disputed such a view. Kasa-Vubu theorised that Iléo could work with the ministers that had not been revoked until he had a government ready for a parliamentary vote. (Note: Young wrote that "legally a Prime Minister designate is considered provisionally to be in office until he wins or loses his vote of confidence, and a revoked Prime Minister leaves office immediately.") As Iléo was no longer serving as President of the Senate, Lumumba hoped his ally, Okito, would assume the position, which would then place him next in the line of succession to the presidency in case of Kasa-Vubu's removal from office. On the evening of 6 September Kasa-Vubu summoned prosecutor Rene Rom and pressured him to draft a warrant for Lumumba's arrest. Cordier and ONUC Commander Carl von Horn ordered peacekeepers to shut down the airport and restrict access to the radio station, fearing Lumumba would fly in loyal troops from Stanleyville to regain control of the capital and provoke a civil war. Despite the confusion, Lumumba was still able to exercise his powers and resumed the military campaign against South Kasai and Katanga.

Lumumba and the ministers who remained loyal to him ordered the arrest of Delvaux and Bomboko for countersigning the dismissal order. The latter sought refuge in the presidential palace (which was guarded by UN peacekeepers), but early in the morning on 7 September the former was detained and confined in the prime minister's residence by Lumbala. (Note: Lumumba denied having authorised the arrests and issued an apology before the Chamber.) Rom was also detained and questioned by Mwamba. Meanwhile, the Chamber convened to discuss Kasa-Vubu's dismissal order and hear Lumumba's reply. Delvaux made an unexpected appearance and took to the dais to denounce his arrest and declare his resignation from the government. He was enthusiastically applauded by the opposition. Lumumba then delivered his speech. Instead of directly attacking Kasa-Vubu ad hominem, Lumumba accused obstructionist politicians and ABAKO of using the presidency as a front for disguising their activities. He noted that Kasa-Vubu had never before offered any criticism of the government and portrayed their relationship as one of cooperation. He lambasted Delvaux and Nkayi for their role in the Geneva negotiations and for their failure to consult the rest of the government. Lumumba followed his arguments with an analysis of the Loi Fondemental and finished by asking Parliament to assemble a "commission of sages" to examine the Congo's troubles. The Chamber, at the suggestion of its presiding officer, voted to annul both Kasa-Vubu's and Lumumba's declarations of dismissal, 60 to 19. The following day Lumumba delivered a similar speech before the Senate, which subsequently delivered the government a vote of confidence, 49 to zero with seven abstentions. (Note: According to de Witte, the vote was tallied as 41 to two with six abstentions.) Several senators also lodged an interpellation against Bomboko and Delvaux, requesting an explanation for their signing of the dismissal order.

=== Constitutionality of the dismissals ===
The constitutionality of the revocation is disputed. Sociologist Ludo de Witte described Kasa-Vubu's dismissal order as "clearly not constitutional" and labeled the invoked Article 22 as a "totally obsolete" provision which could only be resolved "by a law or revision of the constitution, passed by a parliament with confidence in Lumumba." International relations scholar Evan Luard wrote, "Of Kasa-Vubu's move [...] it can reasonably be said that by the way he used his power without referring to Parliament amounted to an abuse of the constitution". Historians Emmanuel Gerard and Bruce Kuklick noted that in August 1960 Baudouin, operating within the confines of the extremely similar Belgian Constitution, had asked Prime Minister Eyskens to resign, but that Eyskens, having a solid parliamentary majority, refused and retained his office. However, the relevant article was never formally invoked in the king's request. Bomboko released a statement in late September that asserted that while "normally" a government under the constitution would be unseated by a censure from Parliament, "On occasion [the President] can revoke a government when this measure is deemed necessary for any grave reason. In this case, the Parliament is not, and cannot, be invited to vote its confidence or lack of confidence in the government." Hoskyns wrote, "From a legal point of view it would seem therefore that Kasa-Vubu's initial action was in accordance at least with the letter of the Loi Fondamentale".

=== Attempts at reconciliation ===
Though Parliament had rejected Kasa-Vubu's action, many were still upset by Lumumba's style of governance. The legislature felt that an understanding needed to be reached between the two to facilitate the return of stable government. Deputies were also displeased that Iléo had agreed to work with Kasa-Vubu in a move undertaken without Parliament's consent. The Chamber thus voted to establish a seven-person commission of reconciliation to seek a compromise between the President and the Prime Minister. The commission exacted a promise from Lumumba to reshuffle the Council of Ministers and govern with the assistance and supervision of another parliamentary commission (which never materialised). Other attempts at reconciliation were under taken by African diplomats in Léopoldville and UN diplomat Jean David. The latter acted on his own initiative without official sanction until he was recalled.

Over the next few days little activity was undertaken by Parliament or the Council of Ministers. Lumumba spent his time touring the streets, at Camp Leopold II, and on the radio, declaring himself to still be the legal Prime Minister and employing rhetorical attacks against his political opponents. He ignored Serge Michel's urges that he secure a formal vote of constitutional interpretation from Parliament in rejection of Kasa-Vubu's dismissal order. (Note: According to Article 51, Parliament was granted the "exclusive privilege" to interpret the constitution. In cases of doubt and controversy, the Congolese were originally supposed to appeal constitutional questions to the Belgian Conseil d'État. With the rupture of relations in July this was no longer possible, so no authoritative interpretation or mediation was available to bring a legal resolution to the dispute.) On 9 September he announced that he had assumed the responsibilities of the Head of State, taken command of the ANC, and dismissed Bomboko, Delvaux, and Nkayi from his cabinet.

Iléo proclaimed his completed government on 10 September. According to Belgian tradition, an administration could assume its responsibilities as soon as it was proclaimed, before being subject to parliamentary approval. Among the declared ministers he retained from Lumumba's cabinet were MNC-L members Aloïs Kabangi, Alexandre Mahamba, and Alphonse Songolo and CEREA member Marcel Bisukiro. Kabangi subsequently refused to accept the post. Kisolokele remained a minister of state and Bolya was made Minister of Health. Kalonji, though he did not retract his secessionist project, accepted the post of Minister of Justice. Iléo did not present his government to Parliament for a vote of confidence, and even if he did it was unlikely that he would secure its support. Kasa-Vubu issued an ordinance relieving Kamanga, Rudahindwa, and Lutula of their duties. The next day he, at the behest of Western interests, ordered the army to detain Lumumba. General Lundula foiled the attempt and Kasa-Vubu, acting on Belgian advice, summarily dismissed him and announced that Mobutu would replace him. Lumumba separately declared Mpolo commander-in-chief of the ANC. Bolikango, who had been chosen as Iléo's Minister of Information, arrived at Kashamura's office with several gendarmes and ordered him to vacate the building or face arrest. On 12 September Mobutu issued a warrant for Lumumba's arrest, citing his refusal to recognise Kasa-Vubu's dismissal order. Lumumba was briefly detained but released at the intervention of Ghanaian diplomat Andrew Djin.

Meanwhile, the presiding officers of the Senate and the Chamber agreed that Parliament should convene in a joint session to discuss the political impasse. During a meeting on 13 September a number of parliamentarians spoke in favor of compromise and reconciliation. Lumumba then appealed them to grant him "full powers" to manage the country's crisis but assured that he was ready to seek an understanding with rival political factions. Parliament passed a resolution in accordance with Lumumba's wishes but also established a commission to oversee the government's implementation of the powers. However, the authenticity and legality of the vote was highly questionable. (Note: Firstly, pro-Lumumba soldiers were inside the Palais de la Nation during the session. Secondly, it is likely that the quorum of 112 (69 for the Chamber and 43 for the Senate) was never achieved. According to official records, 70 deputies and 43 senators were in attendance (113 parliamentarians). This contrasts with journalist accounts, which fix the number between 90 and 95 parliamentarians. The vote was initially tallied as 88 to one with three abstentions, which would support the journalists' evaluations. The count was later modified to read 88 to 25 with three abstentions. Lumumba for his part was not troubled by the discrepancy and viewed the vote as a political victory. However, on 5 September the President of the Chamber declared that in light of the secession of Katanga and South Kasai—and the withdrawal of their parliamentarians from the capital—the quorum for the Chamber was lowered to 65.) The legislature also instituted a new commission to modify the composition of the Lumumba Government. It recommended that Adoula be made Deputy Prime Minister, that Vital Moanda, Bolikango, and Kalonji be given ministerial portfolios, and that Kashamura (who was strongly disliked by the deputies), Bomboko, and Delvaux be excluded. The next day Kasa-Vubu rejected Parliament's action in a communique, declaring the joint session to be illegal. (Note: The legality of the joint session was dubious, as the Loi Fondementale only permitted such a meeting for the election of the head of state, the determination of the seat of the Constituent Assembly, and the establishment of certain legislative procedure.) Fearing that the Iléo Government would never secure a vote of confidence, he proceeded to adjourn Parliament for one month in an order that was countersigned by Iléo. Parliament rejected it because Iléo had never presented himself for confirmation. A presidential adjournment of Parliament also required consultation with the Council of Ministers and the presiding officers of each house, which Kasa-Vubu never sought.

== Mobutu's coup ==
On 14 September Mobutu announced over the radio that he was launching a 'peaceful revolution' to break the political impasse and therefore neutralising the President, Lumumba's and Iléo's respective governments, and Parliament until 31 December. He stated that "technicians" would run the administration while the politicians sorted out their differences. In a subsequent press conference he clarified that Congolese university graduates would be asked to form a government and further declared that all Eastern Bloc countries should close their embassies. Lumumba and Kasa-Vubu were both surprised by the coup. (Note: Various sources state Mobutu's action was encouraged and supported by Belgium and the United States. CIA officer Larry Devlin later testified that the coup was overseen by the CIA.) That evening the former traveled to Camp Leopold II in search of Mobutu to try and change his mind. He spent the night there but was attacked in the morning by Luba soldiers who blamed him for the atrocities in South Kasaï. A Ghanaian ONUC contingent managed to extricate him from the fray but his briefcase was left behind. Some of his political opponents recovered it and published documents it supposedly contained, including letters from Nkrumah, appeals for support addressed to the Soviet Union and the People's Republic of China, a memorandum dated 16 September declaring the presence of Soviet troops within one week, and a letter dated 15 September from Lumumba to the provincial presidents (Tshombe excepted) entitled "Measures to be applied during the first stages of the dictatorship". Some of these papers were genuine, while others, especially the memorandum and the letter to the provincial presidents, were almost certainly forgeries. Meanwhile, Mobutu terminated the ANC campaign against Katanga and withdrew the army from South Kasai, where the UN established a buffer between the belligerents.

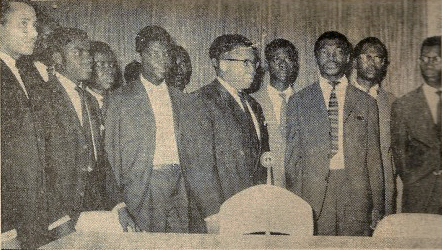
President Kasa-Vubu with the College of Commissioners-General

On 20 September Mobutu announced the formation of the College of Commissioners-General under the chairmanship of Bomboko. Soldiers expelled the remaining politicians from their offices and escorted the new government into them. Of the Commissioners-General, Ndele, Joseph Mbeke, and Martin Ngwete had all been chef de cabinet to a minister in the Lumumba Government. Kandolo, chef de cabinet to Lumumba, was also made a commissioner. Both Kanza and Mandi were invited to join the college, the former at work in New York when he was approached with the request. Though the latter attended the college's early sessions, both became disturbed by the body's inclination towards Kasa-Vubu and summarily refused to participate in the administration. (Note: Kanza said he and Mandi refused to join the "illegal government" because they did not want to "abandon the constitution". According to Commissioner Mabika Kalanda, Kanza had expressed interest in joining to Bomboko and returned to Léopoldville only to be surprised with news that he was not included in the College's final composition.) Their abstention allowed the government's anti-Lumumba slant to worsen without restraint. Meanwhile, Mpolo attempted to undermine the college and rivaled Mobutu for control of the army.

Despite the coup, African diplomats still worked towards a reconciliation between Lumumba and Kasa-Vubu. According to the Ghanaians, a verbal agreement of principle concerning closer co-operation between the Head of State and the government was put into writing. Lumumba signed it, but Kasa-Vubu suddenly refused to reciprocate. The Ghanaians suspected that Belgium and the United States were responsible, though Kasa-Vubu was also eager to re-integrate Katanga back into the Congo through negotiation, and Tshombe had declared that he would not participate in any discussions with a government that included the "communist" Lumumba.

Mobutu, after consultation with Kasa-Vubu and Lumumba, announced that he would summon a round table conference to discuss the political future of the Congo. His attempts to follow through were disrupted by Lumumba who, from his official residence, was acting as though he still held the premiership. On 23 September Mpolo and Gizenga were arrested and plans were made to send them to Katanga. The UN put pressure on Mobutu to release them, which he did the following day. Upon his release, Gizenga left by road for Stanleyville, where he would arrive in October. Meanwhile, Lumumba continued to hold meetings with members of his government, senators, deputies, and political supporters and issue public statements. On numerous occasions he left his residence to tour the restaurants of the capital, maintaining that he still held power. Frustrated by the way he was being treated by Lumumba and facing intense political pressure, by the end of the month Mobutu was no longer encouraging reconciliation and had aligned himself with Kasa-Vubu. He ordered ANC units to surround Lumumba's residence, but a cordon of UN peacekeepers prevented them from making an arrest, and Lumumba was thus confined to his home. Despite United States requests to the UN that Mobutu's troops be allowed to make the arrest, Hammarskjöld insisted that Lumumba be allowed to reach a political settlement with his opponents.

On 1 October Songolo led several MNC-L deputies in denouncing both Lumumba and their party and declaring support of the Commissioners-General. They were probably moved to do so in part due to the circulation of the alleged documents from Lumumba's briefcase and the injuring of numerous tribal leaders in Orientale by the administration while attempting to restore order. Sixteen days later the group arrived in Stanleyville and was immediately arrested by local officials. On 7 October Lumumba announced the formation of a new government that included Bolikango and Kalonji. Mpolo, who had been designated Minister of Defence, told the press that he believed that a reconciliation among the conflicted parties in the government would eventually be reached. Deeply angered by the development, Mobutu dispatched troops to his residence to arrest him. He was not present and was able to return unmolested by the end of the day. Lumumba soon thereafter proposed that the UN supervise a national referendum that would settle the split in the government.

On 11 October Kasa-Vubu issued a "constitutional decree-law" officiating the establishment of the College of Commissioners-General, asserting his right as Head of State to appoint and dismiss its members, adjourning Parliament indefinitely, and conferring all legislative authority prescribed to Parliament by the Loi Fondementale to the college. (Note: Mabika Kalanda, a member of the College, in addition to retrospectively declaring the Mobutu coup and his government to be unconstitutional, challenged Kasa-Vubu's order as overstepping the authority of the Presidency, noting that part of the Loi Fondementale read, "the Head of State has no powers other than those formally conferred upon him by this fundamental law".) In time, the college would come to bring about the restoration of some order to the administration that had been lost during the Lumumba Government's tenure. Lumumba frequently attacked the body's credibility. As the end of the year approached Mobutu backed away from his promise of restoring democratic processes after December and postponed a return to normal governance indefinitely.

President of Léopoldville Province Cléophas Kamitatu remained loyal to Lumumba. Meanwhile, the colonel's soldiers patrolled the streets in the capital with force. Kamitatu protested their activities and accused them of committing rape and violence against local citizens, threatening to lead his province into secession. On the night of 7 November, 30 soldiers attempted to seize various government buildings in Léopoldville, but were arrested. Their officers escaped and the following morning Mobutu accused Kamitatu, responsible for the provincial police, of plotting against him. Two days later Kamitatu was arrested. Following negotiations on the handling of the police and a promise to improve relations with the army, he was released.

=== Lumumba's attempted escape and the flight of his ministers ===
Once confined in Léopoldville, Lumumba began drafting plans to reassert his authority. In a letter dated 17 September addressed to Nkrumah, he stated his intention to relocate his government to Stanleyville. By October, Lumumba's supporters were convinced that few of their goals could be achieved through the College of Commissioners.

"The overthrow of the Lumumba Government meant in fact the overthrow of an independent democratic state with a puppet state its government being either military or civilian. The pattern of the Congo was to be repeated in the decade of the sixties with independent democratic governments being overthrown and puppet regimes installed. The UN vote to seat the Kasa-Vubu delegation showed a new trend."

— Kerrim Essack

In New York Kanza reunited with his delegation to represent the Lumumba Government at the UN. His appearance surprised the College of Commissioners, which had been unaware of his whereabouts for weeks, and also generated hope among Lumumba's supporters that the domestic crisis could be resolved in their favour. Kasa-Vubu dispatched his own delegation. On 20 September the Congo was officially admitted into the UN, but its seat in the General Assembly was left vacant and the issue over which delegation should be seated was referred to the Credentials Committee. Several African states urged the immediate recognition of Lumumba's delegates, but on 8 November Kasa-Vubu flew to New York to plead his case. After several delays, on 22 November the General Assembly resolved to seat Kasa-Vubu's delegation, 53 votes to 24 with 19 abstentions. The extension of UN recognition to Kasa-Vubu's delegation definitively ended Lumumba's hopes of a legal return to power. The Lumumbists also began to fear that the peacekeepers would no longer provide them protection from arrest.

Following his return to the Congo from New York, Kanza avoided arrest by taking refuge in his apartment in a building used by the UN (and guarded by them). He was able to communicate with Lumumba from his apartment via a telephone installed at the latter's residence by UN peacekeepers. The loyal members of Lumumba's government that remained in the capital frequently visited Kanza's apartment to make phone calls to Lumumba. On a 26 November phone call Lumumba shared his intention with Kanza and several other ministers to escape house arrest and go to Stanleyville. Kanza and a few other politicians attempted to dissuade him from leaving, the former convinced that popular demand would force the authorities to negotiate a compromise. Less than an hour later Kanza received a written message from Lumumba affirming his decision to flee and containing instructions to release a diversionary communique in 24 hours to confuse search parties.

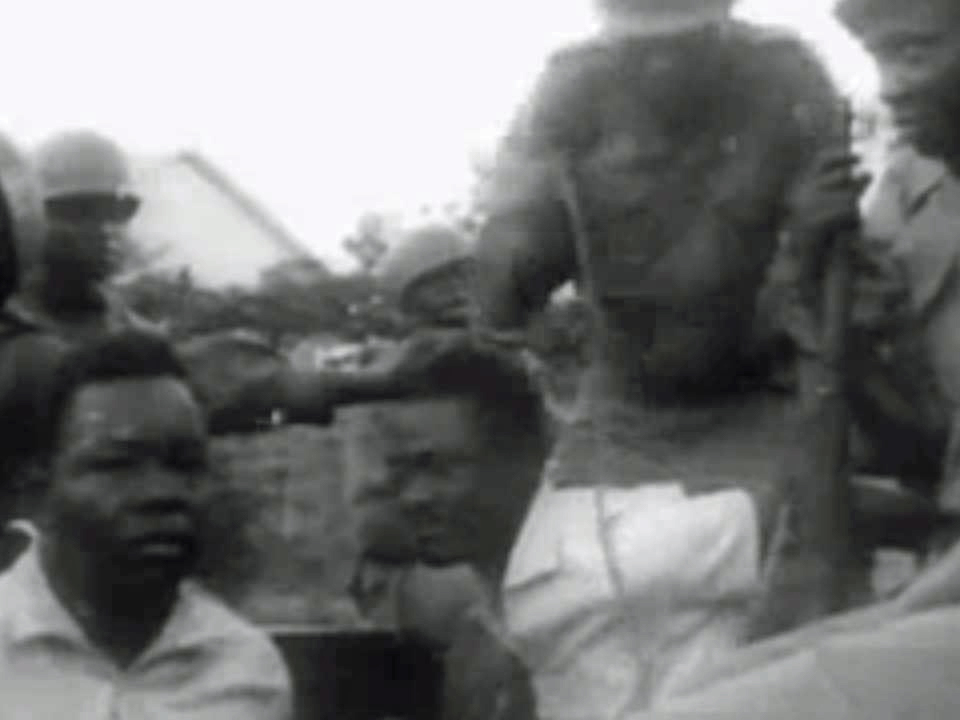
Lumumba (center), detained by Mobutu's soldiers, before transport to Thysville

Lumumba left the capital in a convoy of nine cars with Mwamba, Mulele, his wife Pauline, and his youngest child. Instead of heading with all haste to the Orientale Province border—where soldiers loyal to Gizenga were waiting to receive him—Lumumba delayed by touring villages and making conversation with the locals. On 1 December Mobutu's troops caught up with his party as it crossed the Sankuru river. Lumumba and his advisers had made it to the far side, but his wife and child were left to be captured on the bank. Fearing for their safety, Lumumba took the ferry back, against the advice of Mwamba and Mulele, who both, fearing they would never see him again, bid him farewell. Mobutu's men arrested him and returned him to Léopoldville. He was subsequently imprisoned at the army camp in Thysville and it was stated that he would be tried for inciting the people to rebel. Mwamba and Mulele spent several days in the bush before reaching Stanleyville.

Other members of the Lumumba Government fled to the east, some simply because they felt threatened in Léopoldville. Kashamura, Lutula, and Gbenye reached Stanleyville without much difficulty. A few days after Lumumba's capture, Kanza was warned by ONUC chief Rajeshwar Dayal that some of the Commissioners planned on arresting him for his refusal to participate in their government. He shortly thereafter fled to Brazzaville and sought asylum in Guinea, where he was recognised by President Ahmed Sékou Touré as an official representative of the Lumumba Government. Kanza was later joined there by Kiwewa. Mandi was smuggled out of the Congo by Mobutu, a personal friend, who feared for his safety. Mbuyi and the Governor of the Central Bank, Barthélemy Mujanay, both attempted to rendezvous with the Lumumbists in Stanleyville but were killed in the Charlesville region. Mpolo also intended on reaching the city, but before he left he addressed a crowd of Lumumba's supporters at Lac Léopold II. With Mobutu's government fearing Mpolo's potential to rally support for his cause, troops were dispatched to find him and arrested him in Mushie. He was later transferred to the base in Thysville, along with Joseph Okito. Believing Lumumba to no longer be of much political importance, the United States and Belgium suspended their assassination operations.

== See also ==
- Congo Crisis
