= Kasa-Vubu =

Kasa-Vubu is a Congolese name which may refer to:

- Joseph Kasa-Vubu, the first President of the Democratic Republic of the Congo
- Justine Kasa-Vubu, a Congolese politician
- Kasa-Vubu, Kinshasa, a district of Kinshasa named in honour of Joseph Kasa-Vubu
- Kasavubu (wrestler), American professional wrestler
