= Democratic Republic of the Congo naming customs =

"Every Congolese person is designated by a name composed of one or more elements which serve to identify him. The first name (prénom), surname (nom), and post-surname (postnom) constitute the elements of the name."

— Article 56 of the Family Code of the Democratic Republic of the Congo

In the Democratic Republic of the Congo, it is common for individuals to possess three separate names: a first name (prénom) and surname (nom) as well as a post-surname (postnom). Each form may comprise one or more elements. For example:

- Félix Antoine Tshisekedi Tshilombo has the first names Félix Antoine, the surname Tshisekedi, and the post-surname Tshilombo;
- Sylvestre Ilunga Ilunkamba has the first name Sylvestre, the surname Ilunga and the post-surname Ilunkamba.
- Marie-Thérèse Nlandu Mpolo Nene has the first name Marie-Thérèse, the surname Nlandu, and the post-surnames Mpolo Nene.
- Clémentine Faïk-Nzuji Madiya has the first name Clémentine, the surname Faïk-Nzuji, and the post-surname Madiya.

This practice is distinctive to the Democratic Republic of the Congo and is not found in other neighbouring countries. As well as ethnic, regional, or familial identity, modern-day naming customs reflect significant historical changes under Belgian colonial rule and the Mobutu regime as well as the post-Mobutu restoration.

== Historical changes ==
=== Pre-colonial and colonial-era naming ===
Before the colonial era, people living in the Congo Basin tended to have one or more names of personal, local, or ethnic significance rather than following Western-style naming conventions. This allowed considerable flexibility around the names which could be given to an infant, as the historian Isidore Ndaywel è Nziem described:

This system made available to parents, at the birth of the child, a multiplicity of word registers to name it. In this way, the name to be attributed could be a name of reincarnation (homonymy with an ancestor), of pre-destination (specific according to the position of birth) or of circumstance (in relation to the circumstances that accompanied his birth) when it was not simple snobbery (adopting an exotic word). There were also names of joke, sublimation, social position (from the old aristocratic register) or even accomplishment (acquired a posteriori as a result of the child's peculiarities). Each ethnic culture has its own registers of anthroponyms.

This made names highly locally or ethnically specific in the pre-colonial era. Names could be given to persons either before, at, or after their birth. Infants were rarely without a name for long, though sometimes magic-believing communities would only divulge a baby's second, different name to outsiders so as to protect their "essence" from witchcraft. Some names were gender-specific, while others were gender-neutral. Some groups kept the birth name of a person throughout their life, while others such as the Kongo people changed the name of a child once they reached puberty. The Mbaka people would append a second name onto the birth name of a person at a circumcision ceremony once they were teenagers. Families sometimes changed the names of their children, but Congolese would never change their own names until they had reached adulthood. They would do this if they disliked the connotations of their original name, felt it brought them misfortune, or to pay homage to life events they experienced.

The spread of Christianity to the Congo Basin created a major shift in naming practices. After baptism, converts would adopt a new "Christian name" (nom chrétien) as a first name (prénom) to signify their changed identity in addition to their existing "pagan name" (nom païen). Although spreading to Kongo Central in the 15th century through contact with Portuguese colonists and missionaries, the practice became widespread only under the Congo Free State (1885–1908) and Belgian colonial rule (1908–1960). Often, the new name would be chosen because of its connection to a particular saint and would be of European origin. By the early 20th century, it was particularly common to choose names to derived from saints (Joseph, Patrice, Paul, Léon, Antoine, Alphonse, Dominique, Marie) or names associated with the Belgian royal family (Albert, Astrid, Élisabeth, Léopold, Marie-Louise, Baudouin).

In several Congolese ethnic groups, children born of the same parents could assume different surnames and this practice continued throughout the colonial period; for example, musician Nico Kasanda took his surname from a grandfather, while his brother and fellow musician Charles Mwamba was named after an uncle.

=== Mobutu regime and authenticité ===
"They [the whites] imposed on us their foreign names/like Désiré-Joseph [sic] and/Marie-Antoinette./Since his advent, Mobutu/has rescued us from this/mental alienation/prohibiting these Jewish names/intended for the trees of Europe./Let us take again the names/of our ancestors/like Mobutu Sese Seko Kuku/Ngbendu Wa Za Banga."

— Lyrics from "Tuvua Tutendela Nzambi", a pro-regime song from c.1972 by Ludala Mundoloshi from Kasai-Occidental.

Joseph-Désiré Mobutu came to power in 1965 after a five-year period of political unrest and violence which had followed independence. He gradually created a centralised one-party state under the auspices of the ruling Popular Movement of the Revolution (Mouvement populaire de la révolution, or MPR). He became a staunch advocate of what he termed a "return to authenticity" which sought to mobilise an indigenous national identity as a means to overcome regionalism and tribalism while reconciling those claims with the exigencies of modernization. The MPR announced in October 1971 that the Congo would be renamed Zaire and that various other colonial-era place names and monuments would be removed before the end of the year. However, the decision initially included no stipulations about personal names. Shortly afterwards, the Belgian newspaper La Libre Belgique published a critical editorial in which it suggested that the logical extreme of the new reforms would be for Mobutu to rename himself since Joseph-Désiré was clearly a name of European origin. Embracing this, Mobutu announced in January 1972 that he would repudiate his Christian name. He subsequently added Sese Seko Kuku Ngbendu Waza Banga after his existing surname as what were termed "post-surnames" (postnoms). On 15 February 1972, the MPR resolved that all Zaireans had to follow his example and adopt "typically Zairean names".

Mobutu's decrees were perceived as an attack on the Catholic Church in Zaire which briefly resisted the reforms. Although Cardinal Joseph Malula was forced into exile as a result, there was little popular opposition. In August 1972, it became a criminal offence for a priest to confer a "foreign" Christian name. Many priests did nonetheless continue to violate the prohibition by naming children after saints but not officially declaring this. A small number of political exiles also refused to adopt new post-surnames, as did Mobutu's wife Marie-Antoinette. Although post-surnames were often popular, it was noted that they were often unwieldy as a means of personal identification and were frequently long.

=== Post-Mobutu restoration ===
"My name is Cléophas Kamitatu, and I would add Massamba, because when it's not on the official documents I get in trouble at the airport, so Cléophas Kamitatu Massamba."

— Congolese politician Cléophas Kamitatu introducing himself at a conference in 2004

Mobutu was forced to agree to the liberalization of many areas of his regime's policy in the final years of his rule. In 1990, it was announced that the legal restrictions on naming would no longer apply and that people were free to use Christian names. Laurent-Désiré Kabila who, as a rebel commander had never assumed a post-surname or stopped using his first-name, replaced Mobutu in 1997 and allowed Christian names to be used in official documentation for the first time.

After the 1990s, many people re-adopted Christian names which are now a common aspect of Congolese naming practices while mostly retaining their post-surnames. The existence of three separate forms of name is provided for in Article 56 of the Family Code of the Democratic Republic of the Congo.

In addition to the names of Western saints, it has been noted that an increasingly diverse range of inspirations inform modern choices of first names. These including common nouns (Budget, Verdict, Jeunesse) as well as the names of presidents or employers. Others adopt value-based adjectives (Précieux, Sublime) which are usually positive in nature. Increasingly, some have adopted names which are contractions of existing phrases such as Plamedi (from Plan merveilleux de Dieu, "God's Marvellous Plan") or Merdi (from Merci Dieu, "Thank God") or Glodi (from Gloire à Dieu, "Glory to God").

== Contemporary naming customs ==
In official documents or registers such as the Journal officiel de la République Démocratique du Congo, an individual's name is cited in the format: Surname, Post-surname, First name.

In the Congolese diaspora, it has been noted that it is often difficult to adapt Congolese naming customs, particularly post-surnames, to cultural expectations in the West and that post-surnames are particularly problematic on standard forms.
