= Zairean political exiles =

Opponents of Mobutist ideology

During the presidency of President Mobutu Sese Seko of the Democratic Republic of the Congo, later Republic of Zaire (1965–1997), social and political rights were strongly curtailed. As a consequence, several Congolese/Zairean citizens went into exile for political reasons.

== Zairean state ==
After the crisis of the early years of independence (1960–1965), Joseph-Désiré Mobutu seized power through a coup d'état on 24 November 1965. He began consolidating his power through far-reaching and repressive measures. The role of provinces was curtailed, their number was reduced, which led to a highly centralised state. The country was renamed the Republic of Zaire, and the 1974 constitution, replacing the 1967 constitution, codified the authoritarian state. It strongly curtailed political rights of Zairean citizens. Furthermore, it established the Popular Movement of the Revolution (MPR) as the embodiment of the Zairean people and the only legally permitted party.

At the start of his time in office, Mobutu set some examples to his political adversaries, showing that the contestation of his reign could have deadly consequences. The final Prime Minister of the First Republic, Évariste Kimba, was sacked by Mobutu during the 1965 coup d'état, and replaced by Colonel Léonard Mulamba. In 1966, Kimba and three other former government ministers were sentenced to death by a military tribunal and publicly hanged. Political dissidence was so extremely discouraged that it would take until 1980 to have renewed public political dissidence.

== The Union for Democracy and Social Progress ==
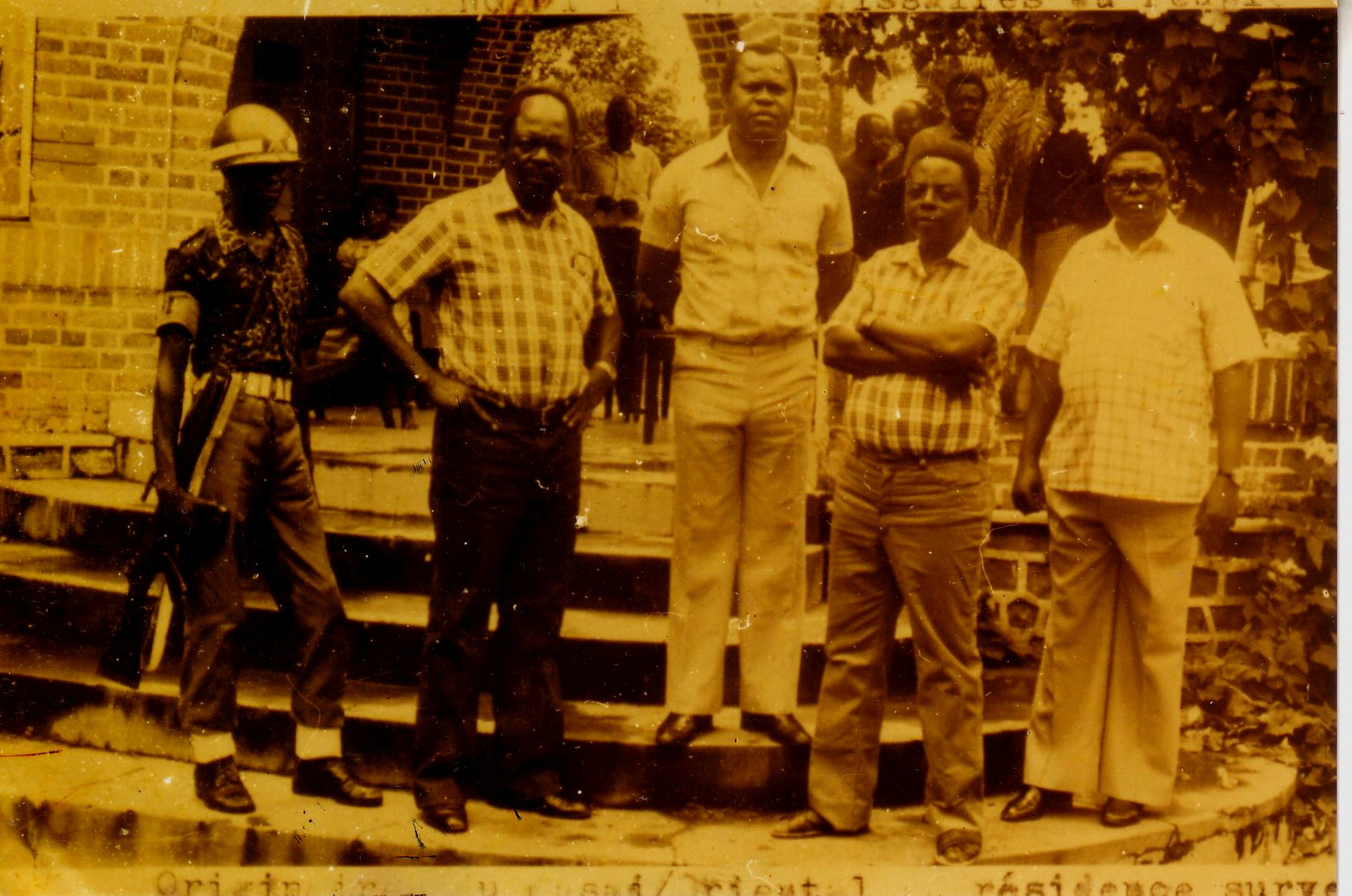
Left to right: parliamentarians Anaclet Makanda Mpinga Shambuyi, Etienne Tshisekedi wa Mulumba, Joseph Ngalula Mpandajila, and Isidore Kanana Tshiongo a Minanga,

In 1980, thirteen Members of Parliament, including Etienne Tshisekedi and Joseph Ngalula, wrote an open letter to Mobutu, stating their concerns with the authoritarian state and the evolution of the MPR after the release of the Manifesto of N'sele. (Note: Etienne Tshisekedi was one of the authors of the Manifesto.) Mobutu responded with repressive measures including the arrest for "aggravated treason" and incarceration of the parliamentarians. Marcel Lihau, politician and jurist, testified on their behalf at the ensuing trial. Furthermore, Mobutu underestimated the favourable response of large parts of the population to the open letter. Contrary to the 1974 constitution, the 1967 constitution provided the possibility for a second political party next to the MPR. The thirteen parliamentarians grouped together with other allies such as Lihau to form an illegal second political party, the Union for Democracy and Social Progress.

== Notable Zairean political exiles ==
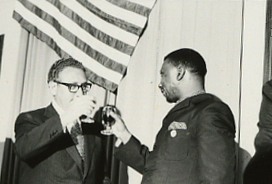
Nguza Karl-I-Bond toasting with United States Secretary of State Henry Kissinger in 1976

Given the precarious domestic situation for political dissidence, many politically active citizens, politicians, and diplomats went into exile to avoid persecution. Moïse Tshombe, former President of the secessionist State of Katanga and Prime Minister of Congo, went into his second exile after the 1965 coup d'état. He was sentenced to death in absentia for trying to bring down the new regime and 'alienation of the economic independence' of Congo because he signed the Spaak/Tshombe accords with Belgium when he was the Congolese Prime Minister. On 30 June 1967, Tshombe flew back from Ibiza to Majorca in a business plane, returning from a trip and possible real estate opportunity, when his plane was hijacked and diverted to Algiers, Algeria. Most likely, the Congolese Ambassador in Brussels, Bernardin Mungul Diaka, asked the kidnapper Francis Bodenan to kidnap Tshombe. Tshombe died two years later under house arrest in El Biar, Algiers.

Some elite Zairean political exiles were at times part of the Zairean government or diplomatic staff, or exiles advocating and testifying against the Zairean regime. Jean Nguza Karl-i-Bond became the Minister of Foreign Affairs from 1972 to 1974 and 1976 to 1977. After the first Shaba War, he fell out of grace with Mobutu and was sentenced to death, tortured, pardoned, and made Foreign Affairs Minister again in 1979. He eventually became the Prime Minister in 1980. (Note: At the time, the nomenclature for Prime Minister was First State Commissioner) The next year, he went into exile again and wrote Mobutu ou l'incarnation du mal zaïrois (Mobutu or the incarnation of the Zairean sickness) which detailed his abusive treatment while incarcerated. He participated in the Russell Tribunal for the Congo, a 'people's tribunal' in Rotterdam, testifying against Mobutu and his regime. In addition, he spoke to the Congress of the United States in 1981. In 1985, Nguza Karl-i-Bond was made the Zairean Ambassador in the United States. In 1988, he became Foreign Minister once again, became a member of the opposition after the democratisation process of the early 1990s, and became Prime Minister one final time in 1991.

Cléophas Kamitatu, one of the leaders of the Parti Solidaire Africain during the First Republic, went into exile to France in 1970, where he wrote La grande mystification du Congo-Kinshasa: Les crimes de Mobutu. Since France wanted to have close ties with Mobutu's Zaire, Jacques Foccart wanted to expel Kamitatu, whereas Minister of Foreign Affair Maurice Schumann wanted to prevent Kamitatu's expulsion. Next to a left-wing activist network in France, UN High Commissioner for Refugees Sadruddin Aga Khan intervened at the Ministry of Foreign Affairs in favour of Kamitatu's stay. Eventually, Schumann's point prevailed and Kamitatu stayed in France.

== See also ==
- Emmanuel Dungia
- Cléophas Kamitatu
- Wivine N'Landu
- Pierre Yambuya
- Cardinal Joseph Malula
