= Free Republic of the Congo =

1960–1962 rival government in the Congo

Free Republic of the Congo République Libre du Congo
- 1960–1962
- Flag Coat of arms

- Free Republic of the Congo in red (1961)
- Status: Partially recognized rival government
- Capital and largest city: Stanleyville
- Official languages: French
- Government: Parliamentary republic
- Prime Minister
  - 1960–1962: Antoine Gizenga
- Historical era: Congo Crisis
  - Established: 12 December 1960
  - Partial recognition: 20 February 1961
  - Disestablished: 16 January 1962
- Time zone: UTC+2 (CAT)
Preceded by	Succeeded by
Congo-Léopoldville	Congo-Léopoldville
- Today part of: Democratic Republic of the Congo

The Free Republic of the Congo (French: République Libre du Congo), often referred to as Congo-Stanleyville, was a short-lived rival government to the Republic of the Congo (Congo-Léopoldville) based in the eastern Congo and led by Antoine Gizenga.

Following Prime Minister Patrice Lumumba's deposition in September 1960 in the midst of the Congo Crisis, many of his supporters became disillusioned with the government in Léopoldville (modern-day Kinshasa). Under Lumumba's deputy, Antoine Gizenga, leftists organised in Stanleyville (modern-day Kisangani) and in December declared their own government to be the legal successor to the prime minister's administration. Gizenga quickly amassed military strength and, by February 1961, had occupied vast portions of Congolese territory. In August, negotiations between the two governments resulted in Gizenga agreeing to stand down. He returned to the office of deputy under the new prime minister, Cyrille Adoula. Still, Gizenga distanced himself from the central administration and rebuilt his own political and military power. The rival government was not fully reintegrated into the Republic of the Congo until Gizenga was arrested in January 1962.

== Background ==
On 30 June 1960, the Belgian Congo became independent as the Republic of the Congo. However, the domestic situation quickly devolved as the army mutinied, beginning the Congo Crisis. In spite of Prime Minister Patrice Lumumba's efforts to calm the troops, the situation worsened. Katanga and South Kasai subsequently seceded from the central government. The United Nations (UN) organised a peacekeeping operation and sent troops to the Congo. On 5 September, President Joseph Kasa-Vubu dismissed Lumumba from his post. The government was paralyzed by the political battle that ensued, and on 14 September, Colonel Joseph-Désiré Mobutu announced a takeover in Léopoldville (modern-day Kinshasa) and the installation of his own administration. Two days later, Lumumba was placed under house arrest. By October, supporters of the prime minister were convinced that few of their goals could be achieved through the new government.

Antoine Gizenga, Lumumba's deputy prime minister, left for Stanleyville (modern-day Kisangani) on 13 November to form his own government. Other nationalists attempted to join him, including Joseph Mbuyi, Maurice Mpolo, Anicet Kashamura, Christophe Gbenye, Pierre Mulele (former ministers in Lumumba's government), Joseph Okito (vice president of the Senate), and Barthélemy Mujanay (governor of the Central Bank of the Congo). Of these, only Kashamura, Gbenye, and Mulele succeeded. Mpolo and Okito were arrested and brought back to the capital while Mbuyi and Mujanay were killed in the Charlesville region.

General Victor Lundula, Lumumba's army commander who had been arrested by Mobutu, escaped custody in Léopoldville and made his way to Stanleyville. He and troops loyal to him pledged allegiance to Gizenga. Gizenga's military strength in Orientale Province rapidly increased, and his army amassed to be 6,000-strong. On 26 November Lundula organised a military parade in Stanleyville involving almost all of the military units in Orientale. The army's cohesion was primarily due to the soldiers' admiration and respect for Lundula and their attraction to Lumumba's nationalist ideals.

Also in November, the United Nations General Assembly voted to recognise a delegation assembled by Kasa-Vubu and Mobutu, definitively ending Lumumba's hopes of a legal return to power. On 27 November, the deposed prime minister escaped from his house and made his way towards Stanleyville to join Gizenga, but he was arrested five days later and imprisoned at the army camp in Thysville. Thomas Kanza, Lumumba's appointed delegate to the United Nations, switched allegiances and acted as a representative for Gizenga abroad.

== History ==
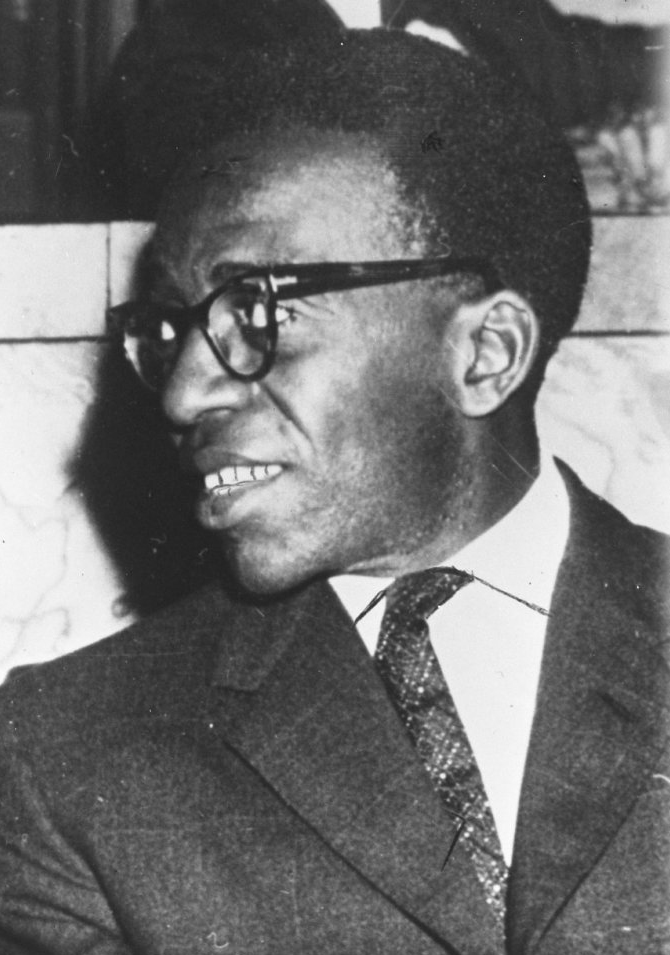
Antoine Gizenga

On 12 December 1960, Gizenga declared his new government, the Free Republic of the Congo, based in Orientale Province, the legitimate ruling authority in the Congo. The central government almost immediately imposed an effective supply blockade along the Congo River. Despite the military power it possessed, the Stanleyville government never established an extensive administrative structure, functioning in the manner of a government in exile. Still, it had more popular support than either the College of Commissioners-General or Tshombe's government. Most administrative functions remained the responsibility of the former provincial government, which had difficulties coexisting with Gizenga's new centralised authority. The moderate deputies of the provincial assembly fled to Léopoldville.

By 20 February 1961, the Free Republic of the Congo was recognised as the legitimate government of the country by the Soviet Union, China, Mongolia, Poland, East Germany, Yugoslavia, Albania, Bulgaria, Hungary, Cuba, Iraq, the United Arab Republic, Ghana, Guinea, the Algerian provisional government, and Morocco. Gizenga demanded that Western nations relocate their embassies to Stanleyville or risk having their consuls expelled.

Soviet Premier Nikita Khrushchev authorised a payment of $500,000 to Mulele. This money was to be used to pay the rival government's soldiers, as taxes had not been levied in its territory and it was not receiving any revenue by which it could fund the army. Regardless, Soviet spies believed that Mulele embezzled some of the money. The Czechoslovak government proposed supplying the regime with weapons via an air bridge from Prague through Egypt, but President Gamal Abdel Nasser vetoed the proposal.

Meanwhile, General Lundula established a staff consisting of officers mostly from Orientale and Kasaï. His three most important commanders were Major L. Loso (in charge of the military police), Major Joseph Opepe, and Colonel Camille Yangara. In order to bolster his army, Lundula increased recruitment efforts among the unemployed youth in Stanleyville and younger members of the Congolese National Movement (MNC).

The Free Republic of Congo continued to gain strength throughout the winter. On 24 December, Stanleyville troops occupied Bukavu and arrested the local army commander. Jean Miruho, the Provincial President of Kivu, tried to intervene the next day, but he too was arrested by Gizenga's soldiers and sent to Stanleyville along with the Bukavu army commander. Several provincial deputies were also taken to Stanleyville. At dawn, on 1 January 1961, central government troops advised by the Belgians entered Bukavu from Ruanda and occupied the Saio military camp. Stanleyville forces subsequently intervened, capturing 40 soldiers and ejecting the expedition back into Ruanda. Both sides continued to exchange fire over the border throughout the afternoon. The following day, Anicet Kashamura arrived to take over the Kivu provincial administration. The situation in southern Kivu became chaotic in the following months; Europeans were robbed, beaten, and harassed, with many choosing to flee the area, while over 200 Congolese were killed. UN peacekeepers were unable to contain the violence.

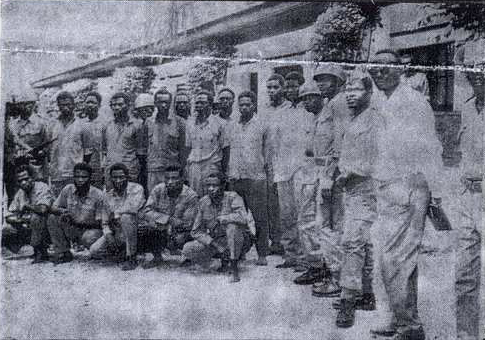
Central government soldiers from the raid on Bukavu detained in Stanleyville

By 10 January, Stanleyville forces had occupied northern Katanga as far in as Manono without facing resistance. Gizenga's authority was also established over the Sankuru District of Kasai Province. Around then, control had been consolidated in Goma and the northern Kivu region. All local political prisoners were released. Fear of another Belgian-supported invasion from Ruanda led to an exchange of fire on 12 January over the border between Goma and Gisenyi. The rival government reached its greatest territorial extent on 24 February when some of its forces briefly earned the allegiance of the Luluabourg garrison.

Also in February, seven Lumumba supporters including Orientale Provincial President Jean-Pierre Finant, were tried by a "traditional court" of Baluba chiefs near Bakwanga and were executed for committing "crimes against the Baluba nation". In retaliation, Free Republic of the Congo authorities shot 15 political prisoners in Stanleyville, including Gilbert Pongo, one of the military officers who captured Lumumba, and Lumumba's minister of communications, Alphonse Songolo. Songolo had broken with Lumumba's stance in mid-October and traveled to Stanleyville with several colleagues to try to garner support against him until he was arrested. The central government had unsuccessfully tried to secure his release.

On 17 January 1961, discipline in Thysville faltered and the central government transferred Lumumba to Élisabethville, the capital of Katanga. Once there, he was brutally tortured at the hands of Moïse Tshombe and Godefroid Munongo, his chief political rivals and the leaders of the secessionist state. That night he was executed by a Belgo-Katangese firing squad. When news of Lumumba's death broke in February, 3,000–4,000 angry soldiers gathered in the European quarter of Stanleyville to enact revenge upon the local residents. General Lundula negotiated with them through the night and eventually persuaded them to leave the city in peace. On 15 February, the Stanleyville government released all detained foreigners. Still, the death of Lumumba brought negative opinion of both Katanga and the central government to an all-time high. Hoping to defuse the situation, the central government opened serious negotiations with Gizenga's government. In March, Cléophas Kamitatu was dispatched from Léopoldville to Stanleyville for talks. The blockade on the Free Republic of Congo was lifted the following month.

Several attempts were made in June to bring Gizenga's government into the Non-Aligned Movement, though the proposals were blocked by other member states. In July, the Soviet diplomatic mission arrived in Stanleyville followed by the Chinese later that month.

=== De jure disestablishment ===
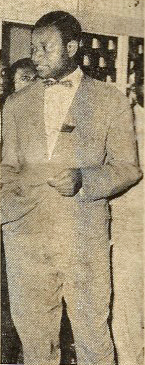
Alphonse Songolo

Delegates from both governments met at the United Nations mission in Léopoldville for negotiations on 13 June. The central government was represented by Cyrille Adoula, Jean Bolikango, and Marcel Lihau while the Stanleyville government was represented by Jacques Massena, Etienne Kihuyu, and S. P. Mapago. Meetings were held over the next three days and on 19 June. At the conclusion of the last meeting, the delegates signed an agreement stipulating the holding of a UN-supervised conference at Lovanium University to discuss the political future of the Congo.

In July UN peacekeepers cordoned off Lovanium and prepared it for the reconvening of Parliament. Gbenye, Kashamura, and 58 other deputies from Orientale and Kivu attended, but Gizenga chose to remain in Stanleyville. The nationalists held a slight advantage, and on 2 August a new coalition government was sworn in with Adoula as Prime Minister and Gizenga as First Deputy Prime Minister. Gbenye returned to Stanleyville to convince Gizenga to go to the capital and assume his post. On 6 August he declared his recognition of the Adoula Government as legitimate but made no statement on whether he would go to Léopoldville. The mending of relations was formally celebrated on 15 August when Adoula flew to Stanleyville and laid a wreath on a monument dedicated to Lumumba. Provincial deputies from the Sankuru region resumed their work in the Kasai Provincial Assembly.

With Gizenga brought back into the central government, the Soviets quickly returned their diplomatic mission to Léopoldville and encouraged Adoula to carry on Lumumba's legacy and end the Katangan secession. China, however, recalled its diplomatic mission back to Beijing and stated that Gizenga's government had "terminated its existence". The United Arab Republic (UAR) kept its ambassador in Stanleyville and declared that it would follow the direction of the Stanleyville government. After being informed on the plan for Stanleyville's integration into the central government, the UAR announced that it would relocate its embassy back to the capital in January 1962.

=== Final dissolution ===
Gizenga returned to Stanleyville in September 1961 to rally armed forces to retake northern Katanga. The invasion failed, but Gizenga refused to return to Léopoldville. Fulfilling none of his official duties, he established a 300-strong militia and began administrating the Orientale Province independent of the central government. On 19 October he engineered the removal of Provincial President Jean Manzikala and replaced him with Simon Losala, one of his supporters. Pro-Gizenga administrators were installed in the Maniema and Sankuru districts, while Orientale and Kivu-based army units seemed to be under his control. The Orientale provincial gendarmerie also repudiated the authority of the central government army and provincial authorities, pledging complete loyalty to Gizenga. By November, Gizenga once again posed a significant political and military threat to the Léopoldville administration. His actions deeply divided the nationalists in Parliament, as some felt that it was appropriate to join him and re-establish a Stanleyville regime, while other felt it best to stay in the capital and push for their preferred policies through the government.

However, by then Gizenga had forfeited his claim of a legitimate successor government and appeared to be planning an outright rebellion. But military setbacks and political deterioration in Orientale discouraged Lundula; on 11 November, he left Orientale for Léopoldville. That same day Gizenga's reputation was further diminished when Stanleyville troops murdered 13 Italian UN aviators in what became known as the Kindu atrocity. On 13 November Lundula pledged his allegiance to Adoula's government, disavowing Gizenga's actions as illegal. In December the central government reached a temporary truce with Katanga, and refocused its efforts on eliminating the threat posed by Gizenga.

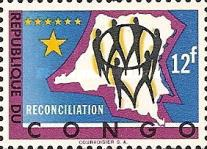
A 1963 postage stamp commemorating the "reconciliation" of the political factions in the Congo after the end of the secessions in Katanga and South Kasai as well as in the east

On 23 December 25 members of the Chamber of Deputies, the lower house of Parliament, introduced a motion calling for the central government to recall Gizenga to the capital, disband his gendarmerie, and appoint a special commissioner to assume control over Orientale's administration. On 8 January 1962, the Chamber of Deputies passed a resolution demanding that Gizenga be recalled and return to Léopoldville within 48 hours, the disbanding of his militia, and the appointment of a special commission to reestablish central authority in Orientale. Two days later, Gizenga responded by saying he would do nothing unless the Katangan secession was resolved. Adoula ordered General Lundula to arrest Gizenga and dissolve what remained of his administration. Gizenga retaliated by ordering the provincial gendarmerie to detain Lundula and the UN officials in Stanleyville who had been investigating the Kindu atrocity. The officers of the gendarmerie refused to enforce the order, probably because the UN alerted its local garrison of the situation. On 12 January, a motion to strip Gizenga from his ministerial post was introduced in the Chamber. The following day, the provincial president of Orientale pledged his support to the central government and expressed his wish for Gizenga to leave Stanleyville. Clashes between gendarmes and central government troops throughout the city ensued, resulting in several deaths. Lundula, with the support of Adoula, requested UN assistance in eliminating the gendarmerie. UN Secretary General U Thant ordered peacekeeping troops to restore order while Lundula's soldiers surrounded Gizenga's residence. Gradually Gizenga's militia surrendered and he was placed under house arrest. From 14 to 16 January a platoon of peacekeepers assisted Lundula's troops in disarming the provincial gendarmerie. On 15 January Gizenga was formally censured by Parliament and stripped of the vice premiership.

== Aftermath ==
Gizenga's arrest deepened divisions in Parliament. Upon his own request, UN troops assumed the task of guarding Gizenga. On 20 January 1962, he was, at the behest of General Lundula and the provincial government, flown by the UN to Léopoldville. Two days later, Gizenga requested that the UN lift its guard, which was quickly replaced by the central government's "protection". On 25 January, he was imprisoned at Camp Kokolo. Upon request from Gizenga, Thant asked that Adoula respect the rival leader's legal rights. In February Adoula assured leftist members of his government that Gizenga would not be executed. He was eventually incarcerated on Bula Mbemba Island at the mouth of the Congo River, where he would remain until his release in 1964.

In May, a Chamber of Deputies commission found Gizenga guilty of inciting a mutiny, mistreating prisoners, and seeking foreign aid (from President Nasser of Egypt) to launch a rebellion. He was formally impeached and his parliamentary immunity was removed. In August, the Orientale was divided into three provinces, thereby weakening its position as a political body. The following month, Stanleyville was brought directly under central administration.
