= Antoine-Roger Bolamba =

Congolese writer and politician (1913–2002)

Minister of Information and Tourism of the Republic of the Congo
- In office 14 April 1963 – 9 July 1964
- Prime Minister: Cyrille Adoula

Secretary of State for Information and Cultural Affairs of the Republic of the Congo
- In office 24 June 1960 – 5 September 1960
- Prime Minister: Patrice Lumumba
- Preceded by: position established

Personal details
- Born: 27 July 1913 Boma, Belgian Congo
- Died: 9 July 2002 (aged 88) Kinshasa, Democratic Republic of the Congo
- Party: Parti de l'Indépendance et de la Liberté (1959); Mouvement National Congolais-Lumumba (1960); Mouvement Populaire de la Révolution

Antoine-Roger Bolamba, later Bolamba Lokolé J'ongungu (Note: Antoine-Roger Bolamba changed his name to Bolamba Lokolé J'ongungu in 1972 in accordance with President Mobutu Sese Seko's policy of Authenticité.) (27 July 1913 – 9 July 2002), was a Congolese journalist, writer, and politician. He edited the monthly journal La Voix du Congolais from 1945 until 1959. He also served as Secretary of State for Information and Cultural Affairs of the Republic of the Congo (now the Democratic Republic of the Congo) in 1960 and then as Minister of Information and Tourism from 1963 until 1964.

Bolamba was born to a Mongo family in 1913 in the Belgian Congo. During his education he took interest in French literature and soon thereafter began to write, publishing various works and contributing to Congolese periodicals. He gained public attention in 1939 after winning awards for his writing. In 1944 he was hired by the colonial government to manage its press division, and the following year he was made editor-in-chief of a new publication, La Voix du Congolais. Bolamba held much influence in the city of Léopoldville and frequently discussed the social implications of colonialism. He also began writing poetry, and in 1956 he released a collection entitled Esanzo: Chants pour mon pays, which articulated his Mongo and Congolese identity.

In 1959 La Voix du Congolais ceased publication. Bolamba, a self-described liberal, grew increasingly involved in politics and founded the Parti de l'Indépendance et de la Liberté. In early 1960 Patrice Lumumba convinced him to join his own party, the Mouvement National Congolais. Though he failed to secure a parliamentary seat in the 1960 elections, he was appointed Secretary of State for Information and Cultural Affairs in the Congo's first independent government. After independence his rhetoric turned sharply against Belgium, and he denounced the country in numerous radio broadcasts. He also began to employ more violent imagery in his writing. In September, President Joseph Kasa-Vubu dismissed him from his post. Under Cyrille Adoula's premiership, Bolamba returned to government work, holding advisory and staffing responsibilities until his appointment as Minister of Information and Tourism in April 1963. He led the ministry until July 1964. He thereafter held press and administrative responsibilities for the office of the presidency, while his output of literature decreased. In 1979 he was given a press position at the state party, the Mouvement Populaire de la Révolution. He died in 2002.

== Early life ==
Antoine-Roger Bolamba was born on 27 July 1913 in Boma, Belgian Congo to a Mongo family from Coquilhatville. His father was a career soldier in the Force Publique. He received six years of primary education from the Colonie Scolaire de Boma, a school managed by the Frères des Ecoles Chrétiennes, before going to the local school for assistant clerks for one year. He then attended the Ecole des Assistants Médicaux á Léopoldville-Kintambo for two years. Bolamba subsequently worked for 14 years as chief clerk and secretary to the medical director of the Fonds Reine Elisabeth pour l'Assistance Médicale aux Indigénes. He became a member of the évolué social class. Later, Bolamba married and fathered nine children.

== Writing and journalism career ==
"[Bolamba] did not hesitate a moment to show the whites the dangers that there were in confining to rigorous, unhumanitarian attitudes, contrary to the doctrine of their civilization; to the blacks, to say the incontestable value of their traditions and customs, the ridicule of their alienation; to one and the other, to reveal the way of deep humanity and friendship, is always possible".

— Literary critic Pius Ngandu Nkashama's analyses of Bolamba's writings on colonialism (translated from French)

Bolamba performed well as a student, taking keen interest in literature. Despite the low accessibility of books in the Congo during his youth, he managed to read many French classics. He soon thereafter began writing. His first work, L'Echelle de l'Araignee (The Spider's Ladder), was inspired by legend from Congolese oral tradition. In 1939 he won an award from the International African Institute for his writing. He also won the first prize in a contest organised by the Association des Amis de l'Art Indigéne for his work Les Adventures de Ngoy, le héros légendaire des Bangala (The Adventures of Ngoy, the Legendary Bangala Hero). His success brought him a considerable amount of public attention. He also contributed articles to several Congolese periodicals, including Band, Brousse, and Nsango ya bisu, the official journal of the Force Publique. In October 1944 Bolamba was hired by the Services d'Information du Gouvernement Général to serve as president of its press section.

The following year he was made editor-in-chief of a new monthly journal, La Voix du Congolais, at the behest of Governor-General Pierre Ryckmans. The publication catered to évolués and was meant to encourage public engagement and literacy. A Belgian adviser was kept on staff to monitor the paper, and likely edited some of Bolamba's contributions. As part of his job, Bolamba traveled frequently and wrote dozens of reports about his excursions for La Voix. Lower-level Belgian administrators were generally unenthusiastic about his visits, and he complained about their lack of support for his work. He also submitted guest columns to La Voix's rival, the Catholic newspaper La Croix du Congo.

As a journalist, Bolamba held considerable influence in the capital of the Belgian Congo, Léopoldville, and expressed deep insight into the sociological issues of colonialism. He criticised racist elements of colonial projects but advocated for the teaching of French and Latin in Congolese schools, as he believed that instruction in indigenous languages would be of less use. He also stated that boys and girls should be treated equally in the educational system. The Belgian administration promoted his more positive appraisals of the Congolese situation for propaganda purposes. While La Voix did publish criticism of colonialism, it generally abridged or rebutted the more severe appraisals that were submitted and Bolamba declared that it would not print harsh, anonymous contributions. This led to accusations that the paper was merely a propaganda organ of the colonial state, which Bolamba rejected in his editorials, arguing that it was a proponent of évolués' concerns.

In 1947 Bolamba published Premiers Essais (First Attempts), a collection of poems he had previously printed in La Voix du Congolais. They were influenced by the French Parnassianism that he had read in school. The following year Bolamba released a 176-page paper about African women's issues, entitled Les problemes de l'evolution de la femme noire (The Problems of the Evolution of the Black Woman), which offered a description of an ideal modern black woman and included advice pertaining to social and domestic behavior. In 1949 and 1950 he made submissions to the creative writing contest of the Conference on African Studies at the International Fair in Ghent, though he did not win any awards. In August 1952 he attended the World Assembly of Youth in Dakar, Senegal, as part of the Congolese delegation.

In April 1954 Bolamba undertook a cultural mission to Senegal under the sponsorship of the Alliance Française. While there he met Léon Damas, a French poet whose poetry volume, Pigments, he held in high regard. Two years later Bolamba published another poetry collection, Esanzo: Chants pour mon pays (Esanzo: Songs for my Country). Prefaced by Léopold Sédar Senghor, it articulated Bolamba's identity as both Mongo and Congolese. Though all of the poems were written in French, some were set adjacent to Mongo translations. Most of the motifs were inspired by tropical imagery. He attended the Congress of Black Writers and Artists in Paris from 19 until 22 September 1956. La Voix du Congolais ceased publication in December 1959 and he ended his work as an editor. Following Congolese independence in 1960, his imagery became increasingly intense and violent and he expressed it in a stream of consciousness mode. In 1968 he became vice-president of the Committee of Friends of Congolese Art. After the end of the decade he wrote little. In the 1980s he served as a councilor of the Union of Zairean (Note: The Congo was known as Zaire from 1971 until 1997.) Writers and was a member of the Academia Brasileira de Letras. Though by then he had entirely retired from writing, he was still the Congolese writer most famous abroad.

=== Critical reception of writing ===
According to Congolese literary critic Kadima Nzuji Mukala, Bolamba was one of the "most important and representative" French-language writers in Belgian Africa. However, he posited that, aside from his contributions to journalism, he was "not a very prolific writer". Nzuji Mukala dismissed Premiers Essais as a "clumsy imitation" of French poetry of the 19th century. Other commentators criticised the collection as being a mimicry of the writings of European poets such as Paul Verlaine and Maurice Maeterlinck.

Nzuji Mukala stated that Bolamba's "only intrinsic contribution to the early growth of Congolese literature in French" was Esanzo, praising it as "a highly original achievement". According to V. Klima, K. F. Ruzicka, and P. Zima, "His range of ideas is rather limited. He repeatedly praises his native country's march towards freedom, but presents his ideas in variegated, fantastic images." Senghor wrote that Bolamba's poetry was more focused on articulating imagery than espousing ideas. He considered Bolamba to be a Négritude poet. Klima, Ruzicka, and Zima disagreed, writing "the philosophy and pathos of the Dakar intellectuals are rather remote from Bolamba's way of thinking. He has chosen his own, independent path and only the ideology of post-World War II African nationalism can be said to link him to the Négritude writers." Franco-Senegalese poet David Diop believed Esanzo contained nonpolitical poetry and suggested that Bolamba, though aware of the Négritude movement, avoided engaging the highly politicised style out of "prudence". Guyanese critic Oscar Dathorne praised the lyricism of Esanzo and noted the theme of protest against injustice in the work Chant du soir (Evening Song), but concluded that Bolamba was only "a minor African poet who utilised some of the techniques of the Négritude poets." Africanist scholar Willfried Feuser said, "Bolamba's Chant du soir is quite charming, but...his imagery lacks the power and density of his fellow-Congolese from the Brazzaville side of the river, Felix Gerard Tchicaya U Tam'si." Donald E. Herdeck wrote, "Bolamba's poetry is often slack and full of trite expressions. Though intensely patriotic, his work generally is not impressive, for it offers neither genuine passion nor visions of a convincing reality."

== Government and political career ==
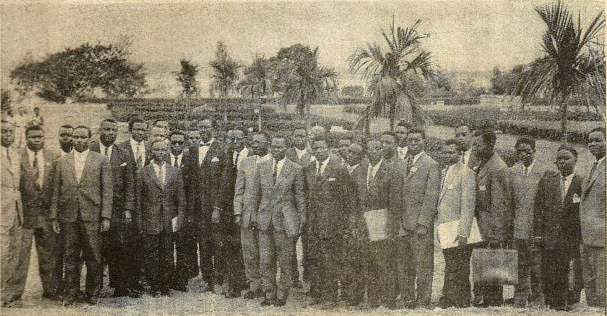
Bolamba served as Secretary of State for Information and Cultural Affairs in the first Congolese government (pictured).

Bolamba frequently advocated for public discussion of the issues of colonisation in the Congo in his editorials for La Voix du Congolais. In 1947, he encouraged the administration to introduce a "special card" for évolués that would distinguish them from the rest of the Congolese population and grant them some privileges. The colonial administration introduced a carte du mérite civique (civic merit card) the following year, which could be granted to any Congolese who had no criminal record, did not practice polygamy, abandoned traditional religion, and had some degree of education. Cardholders were given an improved legal status and were exempt from certain restrictions on travel into European districts. Bolamba praised the decision and was himself awarded a carte. The Belgian government regarded him as "friendly" towards its administration.

In the 1950s, Bolamba strongly advocated for evolution of the Belgian Congo colony into a Belgo-Congolese community. In 1952, while in Senegal, he joined Liberal International. The following year he traveled to Belgium where he was received by members of the Liberal Party. (Note: Mutamba earlier wrote with Mulumba that Bolamba joined Liberal International in 1956, and that he also joined the Liberal Party that year.) The trip was limited and largely managed by the government. Bolamba subsequently criticised Belgian travel restrictions for the Congolese, writing, "Nothing should prevent Blacks to work in Belgium, if they wish to...Black parents should have the freedom to let their children be educated in Belgian universities of their choice."

Bolamba became the first African to be appointed assistant private secretary to Belgium's Minister of the Colonies, holding the post from September 1956 until October 1957. (Note: During Bolamba's tenure as assistant private secretary, the deputy editor of La Voix du Congolais assumed most of the editorial responsibilities over the publication.) He encouraged évolués to join civic associations and served as president of the Association des Anciens Elèves des Frères des Ecoles Chrétiennes (ASSANEF), vice-president of the Mouvement Cultural Belgo-Congolais, member of the consultative committee for Émissions africaines de Radio Congo Belge, member of the regional committee of the Office des Cités Africaines, and member of the consultative committee for the Fonds du Roi.

In 1959 Bolamba was appointed Director-General of Service in the Commissariat of Information. That year he attempted to transform the ASSANEF into a political organisation without success. In July he founded the Parti de l'Indépendance et de la Liberté, later becoming its vice president in December. During the municipal elections that month he secured a seat on the Council of the Kalamu commune of Léopoldville on a Balikolo list. He participated in the Belgo-Congolese Round Table Conference in January–February 1960 in Brussels that resulted in Belgium granting the Congo independence. From April through May 1960 he toured West Germany at the invitation of the German government. Patrice Lumumba convinced him to join his nationalist party, Mouvement National Congolais-Lumumba (MNC-L). Bolamba later explained that he did this because Lumumba supported national unity, though he still identified himself primarily as a liberal. In the general elections he unsuccessfully ran for a seat in the Chamber of Deputies on a MNC-L list in an Équateur constituency. Following independence in June 1960 his beliefs turned sharply against Belgium.

"He is a jovial bespectacled man to look at...sensitive to the atmosphere and not above outbursts of temperament expected of the creative."

— A West Africa correspondent's thoughts on Bolamba's personality

Bolamba was appointed by Prime Minister Lumumba to serve as Secretary of State for Information and Cultural Affairs in his government of the newly independent Republic of the Congo. The government was officially invested by Parliament on 24 June. In August he was put in charge of directing the newly created Agence Congolaise de Presse. He made numerous anti-Belgian broadcasts over Radio Léopoldville during his tenure. On 5 September President Joseph Kasa-Vubu dismissed Bolamba, Lumumba, and several other members of the government. Under Prime Minister Cyrille Adoula he returned to government work, serving as chef de cabinet in the Ministry of the Post Office and Telecommunications. In November 1962 he was made Director of Presidential Affairs at the Office of the Prime Minister. From 14 April 1963 until 9 July 1964 he served as Minister of Information and Tourism. In February 1966 Bolamba was appointed Head of the Press Office of the Presidency. In May 1969 he was made Head of the Administrative Service of the Presidency. Ten years later he became the director of national press of and adviser to the office of the President-Founder of the Mouvement Populaire de la Révolution.

== Later life ==
Antoine-Roger Bolamba changed his name to Bolamba Lokolé J'ongungu in 1972 in accordance with President Mobutu Sese Seko's policy of Authenticité. He died on 9 July 2002 at the Ngaliema Clinic in Kinshasa. On 3 August 2013 Minister of Youth, Sports, Culture and Arts Banza Mukalay hosted a day of tribute in Kinshasa to recognise Bolamba's contributions to Congolese culture.
