= Faida Mitifu =

Ambassador of the Democratic Republic of Congo to the United States

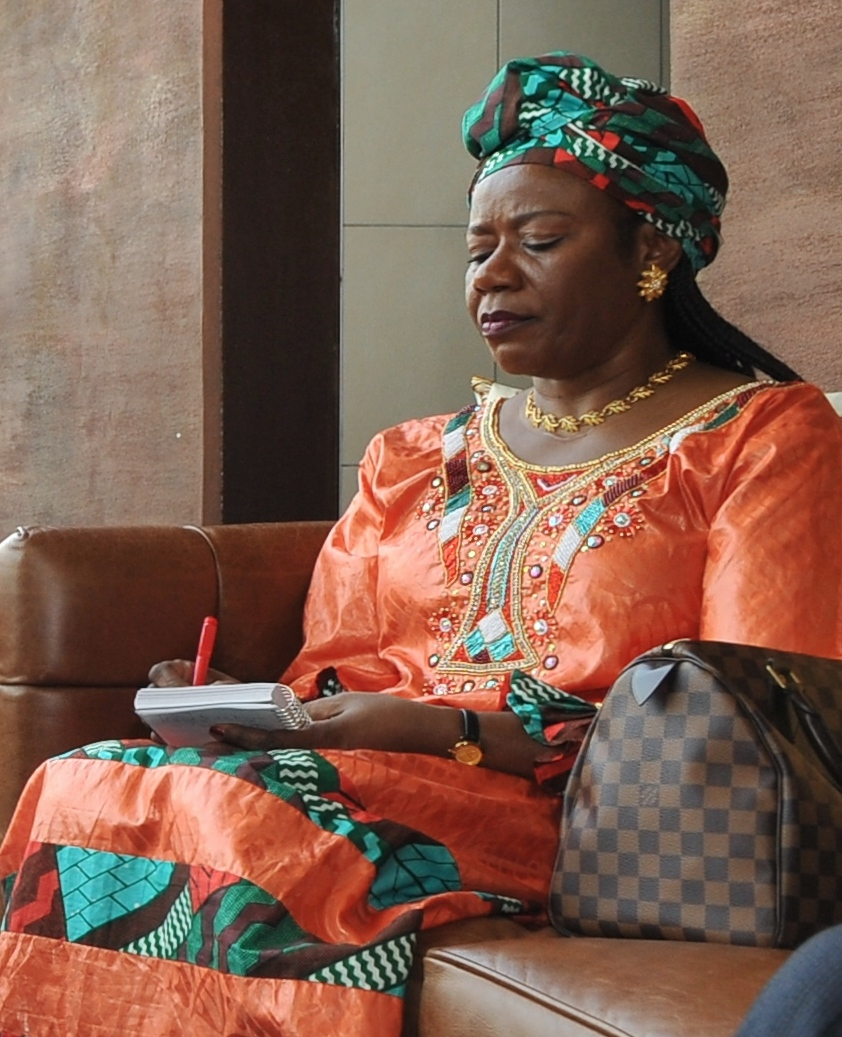
- Born: March 16, 1959
- Occupation: Diplomat

Faida Maramuke Mitifu (born March 16, 1959) was Ambassador of the Democratic Republic of the Congo to the United States from 1998 to 2015.

Faida Mitifu was born on March 16, 1959 in Bukavu, Kivu, Democratic Republic of the Congo. She was the eldest of ten children of an elementary school teacher.

Mitifu earned a bachelor's degree in biochemistry from the Université Nationale du Zaïre in Kinshasa, a master's degree in French studies from Auburn University in Alabama in 1988, and a doctorate in romance languages from the University of Georgia in Athens in 1994. She taught at the University of Georgia from 1994 to 1997 and at Columbus State University in Columbus, Georgia from 1997 to 1998.

While in the US, Mitifu was a member of the All North American Conference on Zaire (ANACOZA), a group of Congolese academics in America opposed to the rule of Mobutu Sese Seko. When Laurent Kabila became president, he appointed four members of ANACOZA to prominent positions, including Mitifu. She arrived in Washington DC as ambassador on July 30, 1998, two days before the outbreak of the Second Congo War. When she left the post in 2015, she was one of the longest serving ambassadors in Washington.

She resigned in November 2015 and founded FMM Consulting Services, which encourages investment in Africa.
