= List of ambassadors of the Democratic Republic of the Congo to the United States =

Coordinates: 38.904092°N 77.040606°W

Ambassador of Democratic Republic of the Congo to United States
- Incumbent; François Nkuna Balumuene since September 4, 2015
- Inaugural holder: Mario-Philippe Losembe
- Formation: March 30, 1962

The Congolese ambassador in Washington, D. C. is the official representative of the Government in Democratic Republic of Congo to the Government of the United States.

== List of representatives ==
Diplomatic agrément	Diplomatic accreditation	ambassador	Observations	List of heads of state of the Democratic Republic of the Congo	List of presidents of the United States	Term end
March 17, 1962			Embassy opened	Joseph Kasa-Vubu	John F. Kennedy	
March 17, 1962	March 30, 1962	Mario-Philippe Losembe	Chargé d'affaires formerly Mario Philippe Cardoso, Minister of Foreign Commerce	Joseph Kasa-Vubu	John F. Kennedy	
April 10, 1962	April 14, 1962	Joseph Pongo	Chargé d'affaires	Joseph Kasa-Vubu	John F. Kennedy	
May 21, 1962	June 27, 1962	Mario-Philippe Losembe	Chargé d'affaires	Joseph Kasa-Vubu	John F. Kennedy	
October 7, 1965		Joseph Nzeza Ndombasi	Chargé d'affaires and Minister Plenipotentiary (Permanent Presented Letters to Acting Secretary Ball)	Joseph Kasa-Vubu	Lyndon B. Johnson	
November 2, 1966	November 4, 1966	Cyrille Adoula		Mobutu Sese Seko	Lyndon B. Johnson	
September 22, 1969	October 10, 1969	Justin Marie Bomboko		Mobuto Sese Seko	Richard Nixon	
October 19, 1970	November 5, 1970	Pierre Ileka	19961 he was Government Representatives Mr. Pierre ILEKA, Official in the External Affairs Service, Leopoldville.	Mobuto Sese Seko	Richard Nixon	
October 27, 1971			Name officially changed to REPUBLIC OF ZAIRE	Mobuto Sese Seko	Richard Nixon	
September 13, 1972	October 2, 1972	Lombo Lo Mangamanga	In 1991 he was ambassador in Beijing	Mobuto Sese Seko	Richard Nixon	
January 17, 1974	February 1, 1974	Mbeka Makosso	Mbeka Makosso founder of the National Movement for Union and Reconciliation in Zaire MNUR 1983. (sec. -gen.)	Mobuto Sese Seko	Gerald Ford	
June 20, 1976		Idzumbuir Bolumba Asal	Chargé d'affaires	Mobuto Sese Seko	Gerald Ford	
June 28, 1976	July 9, 1976	Idzumbuir Bolumba Asal		Mobuto Sese Seko	Gerald Ford	
September 19, 1977	October 7, 1977	Kasongo Mutuale		Mobuto Sese Seko	Jimmy Carter	
August 20, 1986	September 15, 1986	Jean Nguza Karl-i-Bond		Mobuto Sese Seko	Ronald Reagan	
April 20, 1988	July 5, 1988	Mushobekwa Kalimba Wa Katana		Mobuto Sese Seko	Ronald Reagan	
June 8, 1990	August 7, 1990	Oscar Tatanene Manata		Mobuto Sese Seko	George H. W. Bush	
January 5, 2000	February 3, 2000	Faida Mitifu		Laurent-Désiré Kabila	Bill Clinton	
September 4, 2015	September 17, 2015	François Nkuna Balumuene	In 2005 he was ambassador in New Delhi	Joseph Kabila	Barack Obama; Donald Trump	
		François Nkuna Balumuene		Joseph Kabila; Félix Tshisekedi	Donald Trump	

- Democratic Republic of the Congo–United States relations
