= Alphonse Songolo =

Congolese politician

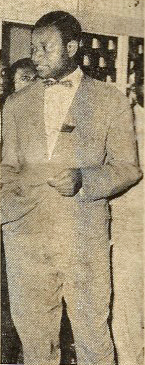

Minister of Communications of the Democratic Republic of the Congo
- In office 24 June 1960 – 14 September 1960
- President: Joseph Kasa-Vubu
- Prime Minister: Patrice Lumumba
- Preceded by: position established
- Prime Minister: Joseph Iléo

Personal details
- Born: 1927 Belgian Congo (Now Congo-Kinshasa)
- Died: 20 February 1961 (aged 33–34) Stanleyville, Free Republic of the Congo (Now Kisangani, Congo-Kinshasa)
- Party: Mouvement National Congolais

Alphonse Songolo (1927 – 20 February 1961) was a Congolese politician who served as the Republic of the Congo (Léopoldville)'s first Minister of Communications. He was a prominent member of the Mouvement National Congolais in Stanleyville and a close partner of Patrice Lumumba. However, in October 1960 he denounced Lumumba and was shortly thereafter imprisoned by pro-Lumumba authorities. He was executed in February 1961 in retaliation for the deaths of several pro-Lumumba politicians.

== Biography ==
=== Early life and education ===
Alphonse Songolo was born in 1927 in the Belgian Congo as a member of the Lokele ethnic group. He received his education at the Frères Maristes de Kisangani et de Buta, graduating in 1946.

=== Career ===
Songolo worked in the colonial administration, including service as secretary for the governor of Orientale Province. In April 1953 he became assistant secretary of the Stanleyville chapter of the Association du Personnel Indigene de la Colonie, a labour union. In 1959 he was elected as mayor of the commune of Kabondo in Boma. He also became president of the local chapter of the Mouvement National Congolais (MNC), serving in the position into the following year. In December he was arrested for his political activities.

In 1960 he was elected as a representative from Orientale Province as a member of the MNC to serve in the Chamber of Deputies of the newly independent Republic of the Congo (Léopoldville) with 2,593 preferential votes. Patrice Lumumba, leader of the MNC and long-time associate of Songolo, became prime minister. He included Songolo in his government as Minister of Communications. The government was officially invested by Parliament on 24 June 1960.

On 5 September, President Joseph Kasa-Vubu dismissed Lumumba and appointed Joseph Iléo to replace him. Iléo chose to keep Songolo in his government.

=== Coup and downfall ===
On 14 September Colonel Joseph-Désiré Mobutu launched a coup and established his own government. Songolo subsequently declared his support for the new authority. On 3 October Songolo, in spite of previously having a close working relationship with the deposed prime minister, led a group of MNC parliamentarians in denouncing Lumumba. At a press conference he derided both Lumumba and the MNC, saying that the party should be renamed the "Mouvement National Communiste".

On 17 October Songolo and a number of like-minded deputies returned to Stanleyville and were immediately arrested by local authorities sympathetic to Lumumba. There were rumors that Songolo was poorly treated in custody, but a United Nations commission later found no visible evidence to substantiate the allegations.

=== Death ===
On the morning of 20 February 1961 Songolo and 14 other political prisoners were shot in Stanleyville after news broke that the central government had allowed for the execution of several pro-Lumumba politicians in South Kasai.
