= Moïse Tshombe =

Congolese politician and secessionist leader (1919–1969)

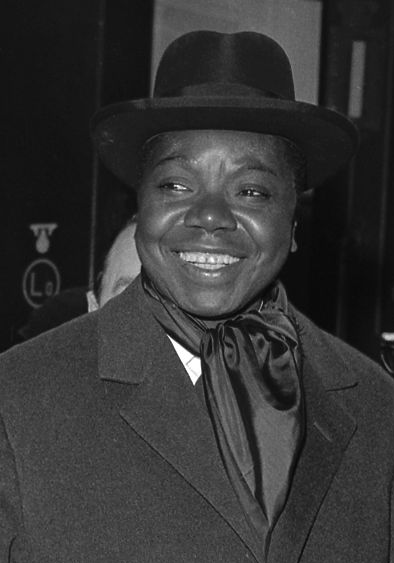
- Tshombe in France, 1963

5th Prime Minister of the Democratic Republic of the Congo
- In office 10 July 1964 – 13 October 1965
- President: Joseph Kasa-Vubu
- Preceded by: Cyrille Adoula
- Succeeded by: Évariste Kimba

President of Katanga
- In office 11 July 1960 – 21 January 1963
- Preceded by: Position established
- Succeeded by: Position abolished

Personal details
- Born: 10 November 1919 Musumba, Belgian Congo
- Died: 29 June 1969 (aged 49) El Biar, Algiers, Algeria
- Party: CONAKAT; CONACO

Moïse Kapenda Tshombe (sometimes written Tshombé; 10 November 1919 – 29 June 1969) was a Congolese businessman and politician. He served as the president of the secessionist State of Katanga from 1960 to 1963 and as prime minister of the Democratic Republic of the Congo from 1964 to 1965.

Tshombe was born to an aristocratic Lunda family and ran several businesses in Katanga Province before becoming involved in politics, cofounding the pro-Western, anti-communist CONAKAT party in 1958 and advocating for autonomy for Katanga province. Following the country's accession to independence in June 1960, Tshombe became president of the autonomous province, and soon came into conflict with the central government's leftist prime minister, Patrice Lumumba. Accusing Lumumba of communist sympathies, Tshombe declared Katanga's independence as the breakaway State of Katanga, becoming a major actor of the Congo Crisis. Following Lumumba's overthrow and execution by Tshombe's supporters in 1961, the Katanga rebellion was suppressed in 1963, forcing Tshombe into exile.

The following year, he was made prime minister of the country as part of a new coalition government against the Simba rebellion by Lumumba's supporters. In 1965, he founded the CONACO alliance, which comfortably won the March and April general elections. However, he was dismissed as Prime Minister in October of that year, being replaced by Évariste Kimba. Following the November 1965 coup which ended the Congo Crisis, he was charged with treason and was forced into exile again. He died four years later under disputed circumstances.

== Early life ==
A member of the Lunda ethnic group, Tshombe was born near Musumba, Belgian Congo, the son of a successful businessman. The Tshombe family were Lunda royalty and a number of Tshombes had reigned as the Mwaant Yav, the traditional king of the Lunda people. He received his education from an American missionary school and later trained as an accountant. In the 1950s, he took over a chain of stores in Katanga Province, which failed. Tshombe ran a number of businesses, which all failed, requiring his wealthy family to bail him out. Tshombe later became involved in politics.

Unlike the other provinces of the Belgian Congo, Katanga was rich in mineral resources, such as copper, tin and uranium, all of which were exploited by the Union Minière company. Uranium from the Shinkolobwe mine was used in developing nuclear weapons by the United States and Nazi Germany during World War II. By the 1950s, the prospect of wealth derived from the ores had attracted 32,000 Belgian settlers to Katanga, which was the highest number of whites for any province in Belgian Congo. The mining industry provided, by the standards of Africa, well paying jobs, and immigrants arrived from the other provinces of the Belgian Congo.

Tshombe, like many members of the Lunda royalty, was close to the settler elite, and felt threatened by the flood of Kasai Baluba moving into Katanga. In the late 1950s, the Belgians allowed a limited degree of democracy in the Belgian Congo and in the first municipal elections in 1957, the majority of the mayors elected were Baluba, which sparked fears that the Lunda would be a marginalized group in their own province. Tshombe's political involvement started in 1957 in response to the perceived threat of Baluba domination.

== Political career ==
Along with Godefroid Munongo, he founded the Confédération des associations tribales du Katanga (CONAKAT) party. CONAKAT promoted a federal Congo independent of the Belgian colonial empire. CONAKAT was founded in October 1958 to address the perceived problems of "immigration" into Katanga from the other provinces of the Belgian Congo, and its platform called for upholding the rights of the "indigenous" peoples of Katanga by ending the "immigration". The majority of the CONAKAT supporters were Lunda, Batabwa, Tshowke and Bayeke, most of whom lived in southern Katanga.

In common with the other members of the Lunda elite, the aristocratic Tshombe looked back nostalgically to the Kingdom of Lunda that once covered much of northern Angola, the southern Belgian Congo and Northern Rhodesia (modern Zambia) in the 17th and 18th centuries. CONAKAT formed an electoral alliance with the Union Katangaise party that represented the white Belgian settlers of Katanga. Both CONAKAT and the Union Katangaise wanted very broad autonomy for Katanga within an independent Congo in order to keep the wealth generated by the mining industry within Katanga. In contrast to CONAKAT with its calls for autonomy and curbs on "immigration", the "immigrants" in Katanga tended to favor the parties that called for a more centralized state.

=== President of Katanga ===
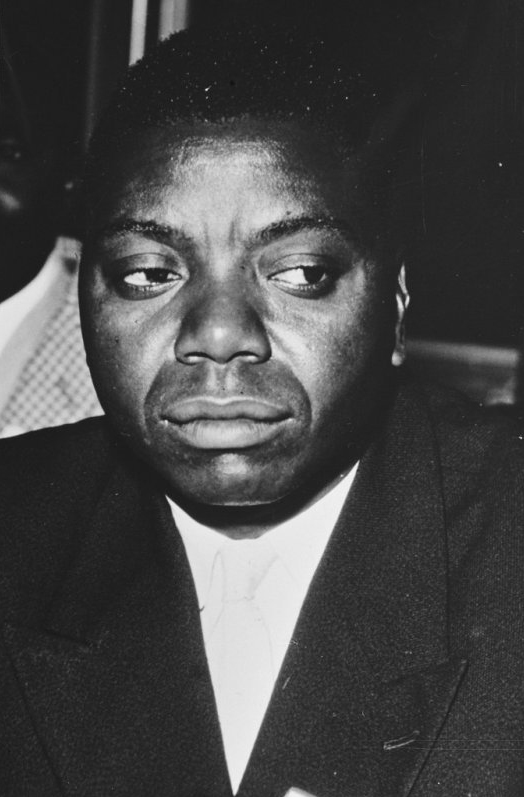
Tshombe at the Belgo-Congolese Round Table Conference, 1960

CONAKAT won control of the Katanga provincial legislature in the May 1960 general elections. One month later, the Congo became an independent republic. Tshombe became President of the autonomous province of Katanga. Patrice Lumumba was tasked with forming a national government. Members of his party, the Mouvement National Congolais, were given charge of the portfolios of national defence and interior, despite Tshombe's objections. The portfolio for economic affairs was awarded to a CONAKAT member, but this was undercut by the positioning of nationalists in control of the Ministry and Secretariat for Economic Coordination. Mines and land affairs were placed under separate portfolios. Tshombe declared that this diluting of CONAKAT's influence rendered his agreement to support the government "null and void".

On the evening of 11 July, Tshombe, accusing the central government of communist leanings and dictatorial rule, announced that Katanga was seceding from the Congo. Tshombe had the full support of both Belgium and the Union Minière in proclaiming Katanga independent. One American diplomat described Katanga as a sham, reporting to Washington that the State of Katanga was "designed mainly for the protection of European lives and property". Favoring continued ties with Belgium, Tshombe asked the Belgian government to send military officers to recruit and train a Katangese army. Tshombe's Belgian military adviser, Major Guy Weber, on 13 July 1960 appointed Major Jean-Marie Crèvecœur to train an army for Katanga.

To disguise its military nature, the force being raised and trained was called the Katangese gendarmerie, but this was highly misleading as it was in fact an army. The majority of the officers training the gendarmerie were Belgian. The Belgian historian Jules Gérard-Libois wrote: "During the entire month of August, a veritable race against the clock took place with the objective, for Tshombe and his advisers, of building a more or less efficient gendarmery before the eventual withdraw of the Belgian troops". Tshombe engaged in a successful bluff in the summer of 1960 as he maintained that Katanga had the military forces to repel an invasion while an army was being raised.

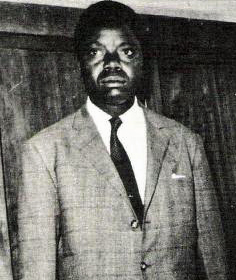
Tshombe in Katanga, 1962

Tshombe demanded United Nations recognition for independent Katanga, and he announced that any intervention by UN troops would be met with force. Nonetheless, Congolese Prime Minister Patrice Lumumba and his successor, Cyrille Adoula, successfully requested intervention from UN forces. UN forces were sent under the direction of UN Secretary-General Dag Hammarskjöld.

The British diplomat Brian Urquhart, who met Tshombe several times, wrote: "Tshombe was not stupid, but he desperately wanted to be liked and recognized. He tended to agree with the last person he had talked to and could be counted on to go back on any agreement as soon as he had seen his next visitor. He was also an accomplished hypochondriac, using feigned ill health to avoid answering awkward questions. “J’ai mal à la gorge, Monsieur Urquhart” ("I have a sore throat, Mr. Urquhart"), he would suddenly whisper. "Je dois prendre immédiatement une piqûre" ("I must immediately get a [medical] shot.") And that would be the end of the conversation. Tshombe was basically a weak person who was always being manipulated by others – the Union Minière, right-wing politicians in Europe and the United States, mercenaries, arms dealers and other adventurers who were after his money."

France, wishing to take advantage of Katangese minerals, sent to Tshombe the reinforcement of the mercenary Bob Denard and his men. It was supported by the networks of Jacques Foccart, the "Mr. Africa" of the French government.

Lumumba's government was dissolved, and Lumumba taken prisoner by commander of the army, General Joseph Mobutu and detained at Camp Hardy in Thysville. Harold Charles d'Aspremont Lynden (Belgian minister for African Affairs) sent a highly confidential telegram on 16 January 1961 to the government in Léopoldville (President Joseph Kasa-Vubu and Mobutu) to send Lumumba to Katanga. That would have stemmed from Lumumba's increasing popularity among soldiers, who might release him. Meanwhile, soldier mutinies and unrest increased by the day, at Prison Camp Hardy in Thysville. The telegram has still not been shown to exist.

Whilst being flown in a Sabena Douglas DC-4 plane to Katanga, Lumumba was beaten by the Congolese soldiers escorting him. In custody in Katanga, Lumumba was visited by Katangese notables and Belgian officers, who included Tshombe, Godefroid Munongo, Kibwe, Kitenge, Grandelet, Son, Gat, Huyghé, Tignée, Verscheure, Segers and Rougefort. Lumumba's execution, on 17 January, was carried out by a firing squad led by a Belgian mercenary, Julien Gat.

In September 1961, the United Nations launched Operation Morthor with the aim of reintegrating Katanga into the Congo, causing Tshombe to flee into Northern Rhodesia for a time. However, the Katangese gendarmerie proved to be tougher than expected and in the siege of Jadotville, Irish troops serving under the United Nations flag were forced to surrender. Hammarskjöld, flew to meet Tshombe to discuss a ceasefire. After the meeting, Hammarskjöld was killed in an airplane crash.

Tshombe become an iconic figure for American conservatives in the 1960s, who saw him as an acceptable African leader. The American historian Kyle Burke wrote: "To them [American conservatives], Tshombe represented a comfortable kind of decolonization, in which elite Africans would manage the transition from colony to nation without altering the existing racial, political and economic order, thereby ensuring that communists would not gain a foothold in these countries". American conservatives presented the Belgian Congo as a place of racial harmony, which Tshombe had tried to preserve.

The principal lobbying group for Tshombe was the American Committee for Aid to Katangan Freedom Fighters that portrayed the United Nations as a communist-dominated organization that was seeking to crush Katanga to achieve Soviet foreign policy goals in Africa. The support for Tshombe was at least in part related to American domestic politics as the Kennedy administration supported the United Nations against Katanga and the support for Tshombe in the United States came mostly from conservative Republicans and Democrats, who used Kennedy's opposition to Tshombe to argue that he was "soft on communism". By contrast, Afro-Americans loathed Tshombe, seeing him as an "Uncle Tom" figure and a black man who was submissive and docile towards the colonial regime.

=== Prime Minister of the Congo ===
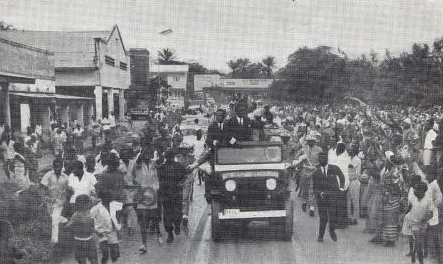
Prime Minister Tshombe touring Stanleyville in 1964

In 1963, UN forces succeeded in suppressing Katanga, driving Tshombe into exile in Northern Rhodesia and then Spain. Tshombe took 890 suitcases full of one million gold pieces with him into exile, which he placed into various European banks, allowing him to live in comfort and luxury. At the same time, the UN forces found that the Katangese treasury had been stripped bare. The entire vault contained only £10 British pounds together with one dead rat.

In early 1964, the Simba rebellion broke out and the Congolese government rapidly lost control of the entire eastern half of the Congo. At the same time, Tshombe started to correspond with several of his former enemies such as the justice minister, Justin-Marie Bomboko; the police chief, Victor Nendaka; and most importantly, Mobutu.

As the Armée Nationale Congolaise could not handle the Simbas, Mobutu argued that the Congo needed Western help. Mobutu had been the king-maker of Congolese politics ever since he staged his first coup in 1960. He pressured Kasa-Vubu to appoint Tshombe premier on the grounds that he was the Congolese politician most likely to secure Western support.

Most of the economic concessions in the Belgian Congo were para-statal, as the Belgian state had invested its own funds alongside those of European capitalists in developing the concessions. When Belgium granted independence to the Congo in 1960, the Belgians refused to transfer their shares in the concessions to the Congolese state under the grounds that the Congo refused to assume the debts that the Belgians had incurred when developing the concessions, which deprived the Congolese state of much needed revenue.

In March 1964, the Belgian Foreign Minister Paul-Henri Spaak visited Leopoldville and agreed to transfer the Belgian shares of the concessions. During the same visit, Spaak seems to have made appointing Tshombe premier the precondition of the share transfer. Finally, the administration of John F. Kennedy was very hostile towards Tshombe, but on 22 November 1963 Kennedy was assassinated. Kennedy's successor, Lyndon B. Johnson was more supportive of Tshombe, viewing him as a firmly pro-Western politician.

In July 1964, he returned to the Congo to serve as prime minister in a new coalition government. His cabinet was sworn in on 10 July. Tshombe's national support was derived from the backing of provincial political bosses, customary chiefs, and foreign financial interests. Among his first acts in office were the lifting of a curfew in Léopoldville, the release of 600 political prisoners—including Antoine Gizenga, and the ordering of Katangese gendarmes to return from their exile in Angola to the Congo and join the national army.

Tshombe had made extensive use of white mercenaries to fight for Katanga, and as the Congolese premier, he hired the same mercenaries to fight for the Congo. The return of Tshombe to power was met with criticism. Malcolm X detested Tshombe as an "Uncle Tom", and in a 1964 speech in New York called him "the worst African ever born" and "the man who in cold blood, cold blood, committed an international crime – murdered Patrice Lumumba".

In a New Year's message at the beginning of 1965, Tshombe rejected conciliation with the Simba rebels and called for their total defeat. Tshombe formed the federalist Convention Nationale Congolaise (CONACO), a bloc of forty-nine parties for the 1965 general election. The party won comfortably gaining 38 seats with the alliance as a whole winning 122 seats. Despite this victory Tshombe was dismissed from his position as Prime Minister in October 1965 by Kasa-Vubu and replaced by Évariste Kimba. In November, Mobutu, who had just staged a successful coup against Kasa-Vubu, brought charges of treason against Tshombe, who again fled the country and settled in Francoist Spain.

== Later life ==
In 1965, Tshombe's brother, Daniel, became the Mwaant Yav, which greatly added to his appeal in Katanga. Traditionally, the title of Mwaant Yav alternated between different Lunda royal families, but since 1965 the office of Mwaant Yav has been held by members of the Tshombe family. In 1967, Tshombe was sentenced to death in absentia.

On 30 June 1967, Tshombe was in a Hawker Siddeley jet aircraft that was hijacked by Francis Bodenan, an agent of the French SDECE. According to the Congolese government, Tshombe was travelling to Africa. He was taken to Algeria, jailed, and placed under house arrest. At his trial, he was represented by French lawyer René Floriot. The pilots of the plane, Britons Trevor Copleston and David Taylor, were released and returned to the United Kingdom. The Congolese government demanded his extradition to Congo and his Western supporters agitated for his release.

The Algerians resisted both demands. A part of his supporters gathered to form the Tshombe Emergency Committee in the U.S., including Marvin Liebman and William F. Buckley, to press for his release and move to Spain. The Tshombe Emergency Committee filed a number of legal challenges to force the Algerians to release Tshombe to no avail. Long-time aide Michel Struelens travelled to different European cities to lobby for Tshombe, eventually to no avail.

== Death and legacy ==
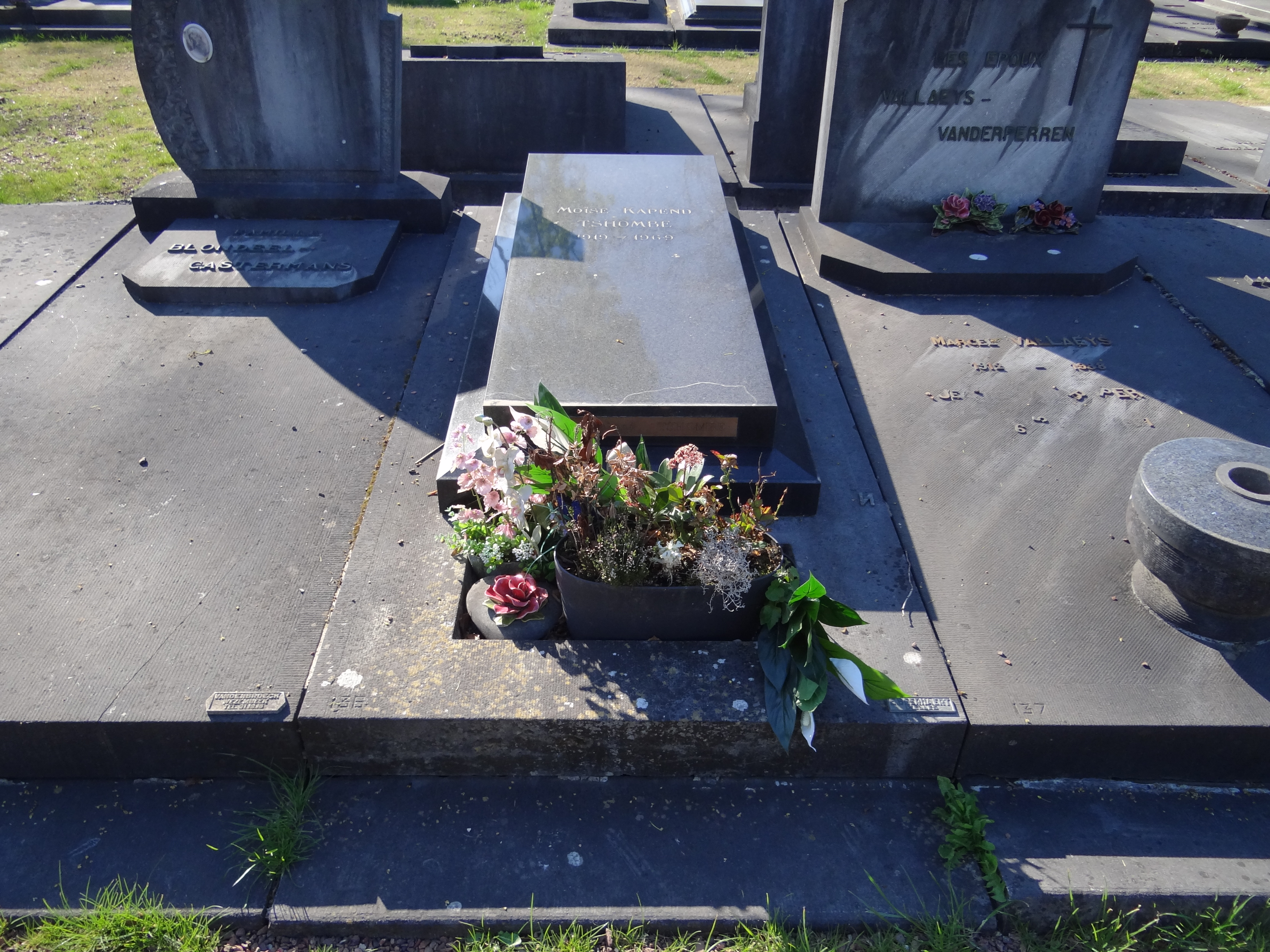
Gravesite of Tshombe at Etterbeek Cemetery

Tshombe died in Algeria in 1969. The Algerian government called in eight Algerian doctors and three French doctors, who concluded that he died in his sleep. Later, a postmortem concluded a natural death. Tshombe's nephew Joseph Kayomb Tshombe reported that no doctor chosen by the Tshombe family was admitted at the postmortem.

Further doubts were raised regarding Tshombe's death by former governor of Katanga and political exile Daniel Monguya Mbenge, who accused French lawyer Jacques Vergès of poisoning Tshombe by order of Mobutu. In the context of a series of interviews regarding a conspiracy theory about the assassination of US President John F. Kennedy, Belgian mercenary Joseph Smal told author Stephen J. Rivele that Tshombe was killed by two injections with two different substances, prepared by the CIA.

Tshombe was buried in a Methodist service at Etterbeek Cemetery, near Brussels, Belgium. Owing to his role in the death of Lumumba and his association with Western interests, Tshombe's name became synonymous with "sellout" to Black African nationalists. (Note: A derivative of Tshombe's name, chombe, was incorporated into the Shona language as a word for "sellout". Kuchomba is the verb form.)

Tshombe's nephew, Jean Nguza Karl-i-Bond, later became a politician and was prime minister from 1980 to 1981.

== Portrayals ==
The plot of the 1978 war film The Wild Geese is based in part on speculation that Tshombe's plane had initially been diverted to Rhodesia before being sent to Algeria. The film's characters Colonel Allen Faulkner and President Julius Limbani were largely based on Tshombe and his military ally Mad Mike Hoare.

Tshombe has been played twice by the French actor Pascal N'Zonzi, first in the 2000 film Lumumba and again in the 2011 film Mister Bob. He was portrayed by Danny Sapani in the 2016 film The Siege of Jadotville.

== Honours ==
- Knight Grand Cross of the Order of the Crown.

== Sources ==
- Akyeampong, Emmanuel Kwaku; Gates, Henry Louis Jr., eds. (2012). Dictionary of African Biography. Vol. 3. New York: Oxford University Press USA. ISBN 978-0-19-538207-5.
- Burke, Kyle (2018). Revolutionaries for the Right Anticommunist Internationalism and Paramilitary Warfare in the Cold War. Chapel Hill: University of North Carolina Press. ISBN 9781469640747.
- Fouéré, Marie-Aude, ed. (2015). Remembering Julius Nyerere in Tanzania: History, Memory, Legacy (illustrated, reprint ed.). Mkuki na Nyota Publishers. ISBN 9789987753260.
- Gérard-Libois, Jules (1966). Katanga Secession (translated ed.). Madison, WI: University of Wisconsin Press. OCLC 477435.
- Gonze, Colin (September 1964). "Tshombe in Wonderland". Africa Today. 11 (7): 4–6.
- Hoskyns, Catherine (1965). The Congo Since Independence: January 1960 – December 1961. London: Oxford University Press. OCLC 414961.
- Kanza, Thomas R. (1994). The Rise and Fall of Patrice Lumumba: Conflict in the Congo (expanded ed.). Rochester, VT: Schenkman Books, Inc. ISBN 0-87073-901-8.
- Kennes, Erik; Larmer, Miles (2016). The Katangese Gendarmes and War in Central Africa. Bloomington: Indiana University Press. ISBN 9780253021502.
- Larmer, Miles (2013). "Of Local Identities and Transnational Conflict: The Katangese Gendarmes and Central-Southern Africa's Forty-Years War, 1960-1999". In Bruce Collins, Nir Arielli (ed.). Transnational Soldiers Foreign Military Enlistment in the Modern Era. London: Palgrave Macmillan. pp. 160–180. ISBN 9780230319684.
- Meriwether, James H. (2009). Proudly We Can Be Africans Black Americans and Africa, 1935-1961. Chapel Hill: University of North Carolina Press. ISBN 9780807860410.
- O'Ballance, Edgar (1999). The Congo-Zaire Experience, 1960–98. Basingstoke, England: Palgrave Macmillan. ISBN 978-0-230-28648-1.
- Othen, Christopher (2015). Katanga 1960-63: Mercenaries, Spies and the African Nation that Waged War on the World. Cheltenham: The History Press. ISBN 978-0750989169.
- Semonin, Paul (January 1968). "Mobutu and the Congolese". The World Today. 24 (1): 20–29. JSTOR 40394031.
- Sibanda, Eliakim M. (2005). The Zimbabwe African People's Union, 1961-87: A Political History of Insurgency in Southern Rhodesia (illustrated ed.). Africa World Press. ISBN 9781592212767.
- Tuck, Stephen (2014). The Night Malcolm X Spoke at the Oxford Union A Transatlantic Story of Antiracist Protest. Los Angeles: University of California Press. ISBN 9780520279339.

Political offices
Preceded by Cyrille Adoula	Prime Minister of the Democratic Republic of the Congo; 10 July 1964 – 13 October 1965	Succeeded by Évariste Kimba
