= Justine Kasa-Vubu =

Congolese politician (born 1951)

Minister of the Civil Service
- President: Laurent-Désiré Kabila

Personal details
- Born: 14 April 1951 (age 75) Léopoldville, Belgian Congo (modern-day Kinshasa, Democratic Republic of the Congo)
- Party: Union for Democracy and Social Progress; Mouvement des Démocrates
- Parent: Joseph Kasa-Vubu
- Education: Catholic University of Louvain, Free University of Brussels

Justine M'Poyo Kasa-Vubu (born 14 April 1951) is a Congolese politician and leader of a small political party, the Movement of the Congolese Democrats (Mouvement des démocrates congolais), for whom she stood as a presidential candidate in the 2006 elections.

== Life ==
She is the daughter of Joseph Kasa-Vubu, the first president of the Democratic Republic of the Congo.

She was a candidate in the Congolese presidential elections of July 2006, but obtained only 0.44% of the votes in the first round.

After her father died and Joseph-Désiré Mobutu took over, she went into exile with the rest of her family, first to Algeria and then to Switzerland, where she finished her studies. She wound up living in Belgium and there graduated from the Catholic University of Louvain (UCL). She worked in Geneva for the High Commissioner for the Refugees of the UN. She went back to Belgium to continue her work at the Centre for Research on the Epidemiology of Disasters and in Central African studies at the Université libre de Bruxelles (ULB).

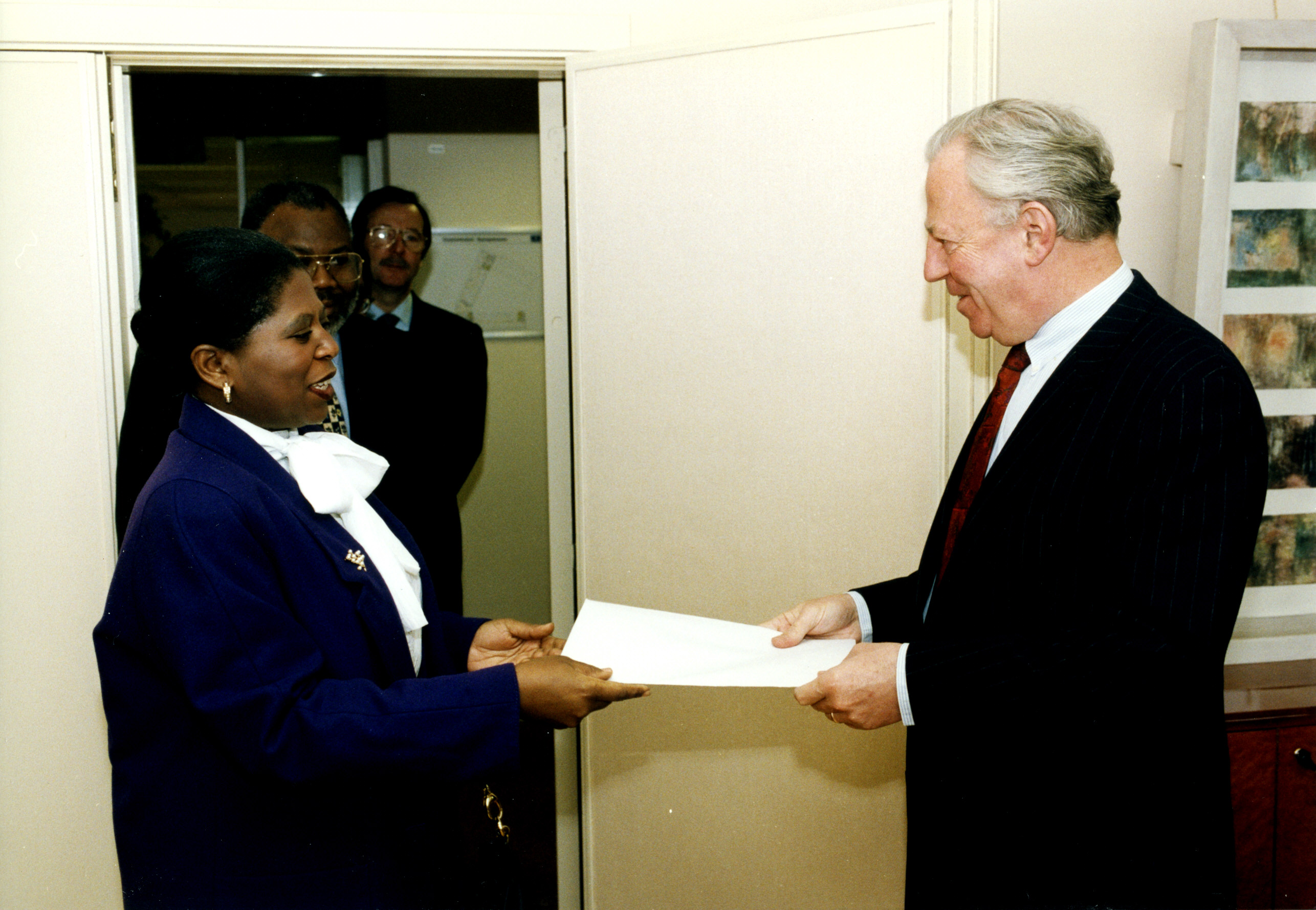
Kasa-Vubu presenting her credentials as head of the Congolese mission to the European Commission, 1997

In 1991, she joined the Union for Democracy and Social Progress (UDPS) of Étienne Tshisekedi, the main opposition party to Joseph Mobutu. On 22 May 1997, she was appointed Minister of the Civil Service in the first government of Laurent-Désiré Kabila. She was appointed ambassador of the Democratic Republic of the Congo to Belgium. She resigned after disagreements with Laurent-Désiré Kabila.

In 2013, she was a member of the Mouvement des Démocrates party. Unlike other opposition parties, she was prepared to hold discussions with Kabila's son Joseph Kabila.

== Works ==
- Joseph Kasa-Vubu mon père : de la naissance d’une conscience nationale à l’indépendance, Bruxelles, s.n., 1985.
- Kasa-Vubu et le Congo indépendant (1960-1969), Bruxelles, LeCri, 1997. ISBN 9782871061854
- Douze mois chez Kabila, Bruxelles, Le Cri, 1999. ISBN 9782871062097
- Sommes-nous décolonisés?, Paris-Bruxelles, Castells – Labor, 2000. ISBN 9782912587381
