= Cléophas Kamitatu =

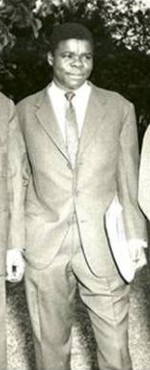

Minister of the Interior of Congo-Léopoldville
- In office July 1962 – April 1963
- President: Joseph Kasa-Vubu
- Preceded by: Christophe Gbenye

Personal details
- Born: Cléophas Kamitatu Massamba; 10 June 1931; Kilombo-Masi, Kwilu Province, Belgian Congo (Now Congo-Kinshasa)
- Died: 12 October 2008 (aged 77); South Africa
- Political party: Parti Solidaire Africain; Mouvement Populaire de la Révolution; Parti démocrate et social chrétien
- Spouse: Marie-José Mafuta Mingi
- Children: Olivier Kamitatu Etsu

Cléophas Kamitatu Massamba (10 June 1931 – 12 October 2008) was a Congolese politician and leader of the Parti Solidaire Africain.

== Biography ==
Cléophas Kamitatu was born on 10 June 1931 in Kilombo-Masi, Masi-Manimba Territory, Kwilu Province, Belgian Congo. He underwent six years of primary studies in Muniangi-Kinzambi and learned Latin humanities at a Jesuit school in Kinzambi. He then spent three years in novitate at the Compagnie de Jésus, studying philosophy. He left and took up an internship at a daily newspaper, Le Courrier d'Afrique. In 1953 he became a clerk in the territorial service. Three years later he was made president of the Kwilu chapter of the Association des anciens élèves des Pères jésuites (Assap). In 1958 he became an activist for the Union des travailleurs congolais (UTC) in Kikwit.

=== Political career ===
In 1958 Kamitatu helped establish the Parti Solidaire Africain (PSA) with Antoine Gizenga. He represented the party's rural membership and its Léopoldville constituents. His leadership of the moderates in the PSA led to differences with Gizenga, who was more left-leaning. He frequently allied with the Alliance des Bakongo (ABAKO), a political party with a large following in the capital, where he focused most of his political efforts.

Kamitatu led the PSA's delegation to the Congolese Round Table Conference in early 1960 to discuss the Congo's political future. He was the first delegate to suggest that the colony be granted independence on 30 June, a stance which was quickly assumed by others and eventually carried out. In June he was elected to the Chamber of Deputies, and also became the President of Léopoldville Province, in part due to his support from ABAKO. Kamitatu hoped to overhaul the local economy by altering traditional agricultural practices and tightening tax collection, though these proposals were not well received in the Kwilu region.

In September Colonel Joseph-Désiré Mobutu deposed Prime Minister Patrice Lumumba and created his own government. In spite of pressure from Mobutu and President Joseph Kasa-Vubu, Kamitatu remained loyal to Lumumba. Meanwhile the colonel's soldiers patrolled the streets in the capital with force. Kamitatu protested their activities and accused them of committing rape and violence against local citizens, threatening to lead his province into secession. On the night of 7 November 30 soldiers attempted to seize various government buildings in Léopoldville, but were arrested. Their officers escaped and the following morning Mobutu accused Kamitatu, responsible for the provincial police, of plotting against him. Two days later Kamitatu was arrested. Following negotiations on the handling of the police and a promise to improve relations with the army, he was released.

In March 1961 Kamitatu was sent to Stanleyville to negotiate on behalf of the central government with Gizenga's rival state, the Free Republic of the Congo.

After Gizenga was arrested in January 1962 for his rebellious activities Kamitatu emerged as the sole leader of the PSA. In July 1962 he was appointed Minister of the Interior, replacing Christophe Gbenye, and in April 1963 he became Minister of Planning and Development, a position he held until 1964. He briefly served as Foreign Minister under Évariste Kimba's short-lived government until Mobutu seized power definitively in November 1965. On 18 June 1966 a special tribunal sentenced Kamitatu to five years in prison for complicity in a supposed plot to kill Mobutu. He soon fled the country and formed the Front Socialiste Africain (FSA) as an opposition group to the government. He later wrote a highly critical biography of Mobutu entitled, La grande mystification au Congo-Kinshasa.

In 1983, Mobutu offered general amnesty to exiled opponents and Kamitatu returned to the Congo. He made an unsuccessful bid for a seat in the legislature in 1988, but was soon thereafter appointed minister of agriculture and made a member of the central committee of Mobutu's party, the Mouvement Populaire de la Révolution (MPR). As the country underwent democratization in the early 1990s, Kamitatu became a top member of Joseph Ileo's Parti démocrate et social chrétien (PDSC). Ileo died in 1994 and Kamitatu had a falling out with the party's leadership, leading him to create a splinter wing of the party the following year. He retired from politics in the late 1990s. He died of a disease in South Africa on 12 October 2008.

Kamitatu is remembered in the Congo as one of the "fathers of independence".

== Family ==
Kamitatu was married to politician Marie-José Mafuta Mingi. They had a son named Olivier Kamitatu Etsu, another politician.
