= Joseph Kasa-Vubu =

1st President of the Republic of the Congo

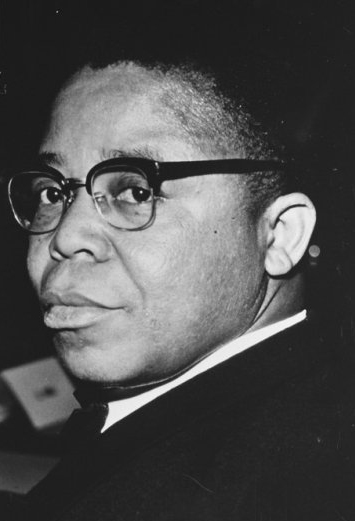
- Kasa-Vubu in 1960

1st President of the Republic of the Congo (Note: As President of the Democratic Republic of Congo after 1964.)
- In office 27 June 1960 – 24 November 1965
- Prime Minister: Patrice Lumumba; Joseph Iléo; Justin Marie Bomboko; Joseph Iléo; Cyrille Adoula; Moise Tshombe; Évariste Kimba
- Preceded by: Position established
- Succeeded by: Joseph-Désiré Mobutu

Personal details
- Born: c. 1915 Kuma-Dizi, Mayombe, Belgian Congo
- Died: 24 March 1969 (aged 53–54) Boma, Democratic Republic of the Congo
- Party: ABAKO
- Spouse: Hortense Ngoma Masunda (m. 1941)
- Children: Justine Kasa-Vubu and Marie-Rose Kasa-Vubu Kiatazabu, among others

Joseph Kasa-Vubu, alternatively Joseph Kasavubu, (c. 1915 – 24 March 1969) was a Congolese politician who served as the first President of the Democratic Republic of the Congo (the Republic of the Congo until 1964) from 1960 until 1965.

A member of the Kongo ethnic group, Kasa-Vubu became the leader of the Bakongo Association (ABAKO) party in the 1950s and soon became a leading proponent of Congo's independence from Belgian colonial rule. He forged an unlikely coalition between his regionalist and conservative ABAKO party and Patrice Lumumba's left-wing nationalist Congolese National Movement (MNC) party, offering support in the government. In the agreement, he received support from the Lumumbists in the Senate and the National Assembly, and was elected president of the Republic in 1960 with Lumumba as prime minister.

Shortly after the country's gaining of independence from Belgium on 30 June 1960, the country immediately faced a series of secessionist movements, leading to the establishment of the Katanga and South Kasai breakaway states and marking the beginning of the Congo Crisis. During this time, a deadlock emerged between Kasa-Vubu and Lumumba when Lumumba ordered assistance from the Soviet Union. Kasa-Vubu accused Lumumba of communist sympathies and ordered the dissolution of Lumumba's government. Lumumba attempted to join a rival government of his supporters known as the Free Republic of the Congo, but was captured and killed by Katangese separatist forces in January 1961.

With UN support, Kasa-Vubu's government eventually suppressed the Katanga, South Kasai and Free Republic rebellions between 1962 and 1963. New pro-Lumumba rebellions also emerged in 1963 in the form of the Kwilu and Simba rebellions, which were both later defeated by 1965. Following a political stalemate, Kasa-Vubu was finally deposed by a coup d'état led by Joseph-Désiré Mobutu in November 1965. He died four years later.

== Early life and education ==
Joseph Kasa-Vubu was born in the village of Kuma-Dizi in the Mayombe district in the Bas-Congo, in the west of the Belgian Congo. Different sources list his year of birth as 1910, 1913, 1915, or 1917, though 1915 is the most probable date. He was the eighth of nine children in a family of the Yombe people, an ethnic group that is a subset of the Kongo people. His father was a successful farmer who, as an independent entrepreneur, traded with street merchants in Cabinda and built his house at the outskirts of the village. This earned him the animosity of the villagers and in an attempt to assuage their hostility he volunteered to undergo a "poison test" with a substance extracted from a kasa tree. (Note: The poison from a kasa tree was used to determine whether or not a person was a witch. According to biographer Charles-André Gilis, the test occurred on the day of Kasa-Vubu's birth.) The word "Kasa" was appended onto his name in commemoration of the event. Kasa-Vubu's mother died four years after his birth, and his father died in 1936. On 31 January 1925 he was baptised under the Christian name of Joseph at the Scheutist Catholic mission of Kizu, near Tshela.

In 1927 Kasa-Vubu enrolled in primary school at the third-year level. The following year he transferred to a minor seminary in Mbata-Kiela, 50 kilometers away from Tshela. There he completed his primary studies and began learning Latin and humanities in preparation for instruction at major seminary. An industrious student, Kasa-Vubu graduated second in his class in 1936 and was admitted to the Kabwe seminary in Kasai Province. He intended to study three years of philosophy and five years of theology before becoming an ordained priest. Following the completion of the former courses in 1939 he was expelled by the bishop. (Note: No official reasoning was ever given for Kasa-Vubu's expulsion, though Gilis and Kasa-Vubu's daughter, Justine, attribute this to his alleged commitment to an academic pursuit of justice that ran afoul of his teachers' ideals.)

Kasa-Vubu subsequently returned to Mayombe and took up work as a bookkeeper for the Kangu mission. Dissatisfied with his salary of 80 francs per month, Kasa-Vubu passed the instructor's exam and became a sixth-grade teacher at the mission school in early 1941. However, his pay was not increased and he left the mission in open disagreement with the superior and the local bishop. In May he found a new job at Agrifor, an agricultural and logging company. With a monthly pay of 500 francs, he felt financially secure enough to marry; on 10 October Kasa-Vubu wedded Hortense Ngoma Masunda in a Catholic ceremony at the Kangu mission. They had nine children.

In June 1942 Kasa-Vubu earned a job as a clerk in the finance department of the Belgian colonial administration in Léopoldville, the capital of the Congo. He worked there for 15 years, attaining the rank of chief clerk, the highest level of employment available to Congolese civil servants under Belgian rule. In 1956 he was in charge of accounting for all of the administration's general stores.

=== Political activities ===
Kasa-Vubu began semi-clandestine political organising work while he was still employed by colonial authorities.

Following the resignation of its leader on 21 March 1954, Kasa-Vubu was elected president of the Bakongo Association (ABAKO). Under his leadership, the group swept the first open municipal Leopoldville elections in 1957 and he was elected mayor of the Dendale district of the city.

Kasa-Vubu quickly became known as one of the first Congolese leaders to call for independence. At first, he advocated for independence from Belgium on a 30-year timeline, but he shortened the timetable as the ABAKO movement gained in strength. In his inauguration speech as mayor of Dendale, Kasa-Vubu reiterated his demand for independence, drawing a reprimand from Belgian colonial authorities, which only strengthened his image as a Congolese leader.

On 4 January 1959, an ABAKO political gathering organised by Kasa-Vubu erupted into violence, sparking the Léopoldville riots, a pivotal moment in the Congolese struggle for independence. Kasa-Vubu was set to address the crowd on African nationalism, but colonial authorities banned the meeting. They were unable to calm the crowd and thousands of Congolese began rioting. Kasa-Vubu was arrested, along with several other leaders, and imprisoned for inciting the riot. He was released two months later.

== Presidency ==
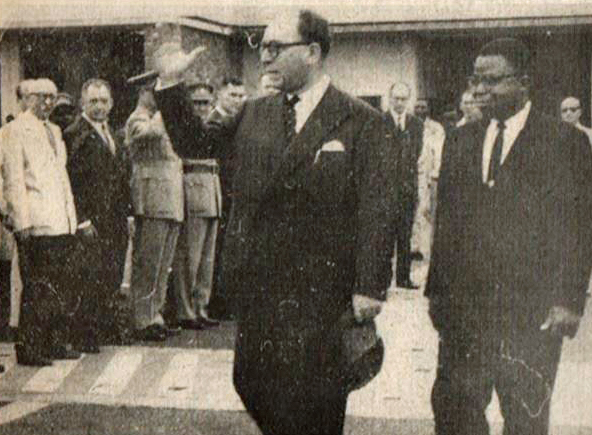
Kasa-Vubu with the outgoing Governor-General of the Congo, Hendrik Cornelis, before the latter's departure from the country, July 1960.

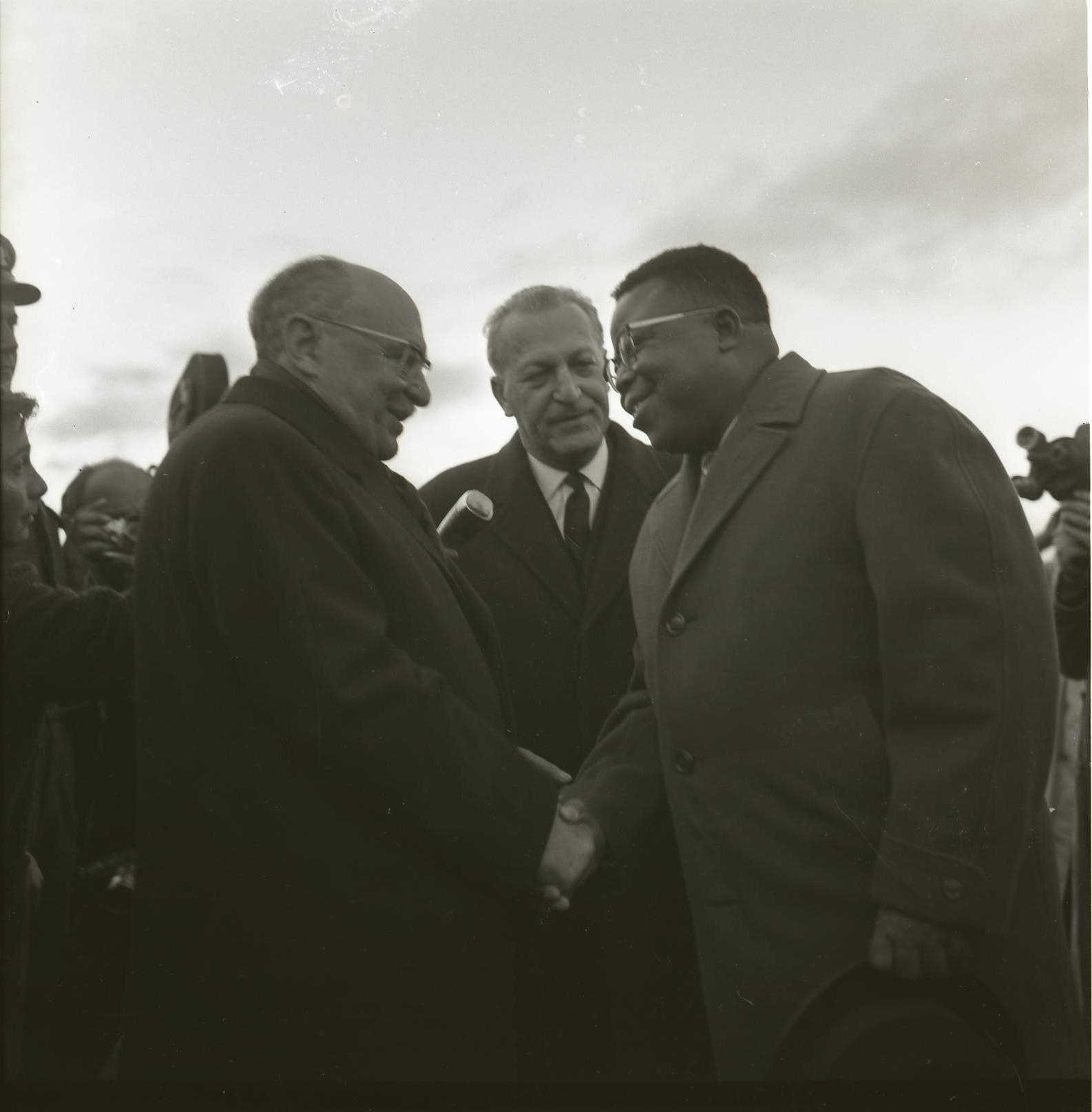
Kasa-Vubu during a 1963 visit to Israel, with the President Zalman Shazar

After Congo's independence from Belgium, his ABAKO party received 9.47% of the national vote for the Chamber of Deputies in the 1960 Belgian Congo general election, giving it a disappointing third place with 12 seats. In the Senate in the same election, ABAKO's result was even worse, receiving just over 5% of the vote and winning only 5 parliamentary seats. He forged an unlikely coalition between his regionalist and conservative ABAKO party and Patrice Lumumba's left-wing nationalist and election-winning Congolese National Movement (MNC) party, offering support in the government. In return, he received from the Lumumbists the indirect election of President of the Republic in the Senate and the National Assembly in 1960, defeating Jean Bolikango, his former political mentor. The alliance between Kasa-Vubu and Lumumba was at least in part organized by Belgium, and his election as president was well received there. This was evidenced by the warm positive reaction of the Belgian press as well as of pro-Belgian Léopoldville periodicals such as the Courrier d'Afrique. The United States also expressed satisfaction at the election of a conservative to the Congolese government. Belgian politicians expected Kasa-Vubu to act as a "restraining influence" on Lumumba's government, and failing that, that the Force Publique would always be able to "maintain law and order". He was officially sworn in as president on 27 June 1960.

The new republic was immediately destabilized by political and military conflicts and regional secessionist movements, and the central government was paralyzed by the conflict between the conservative Kasa-Vubu and the left-wing nationalist Prime Minister Lumumba. While Lumumba advocated a modernizing and multiracial central government, Kasa-Vubu attempted to implement a more regionalist and tribalist form of government under a veneer of federalism.

His role as head of state, which was supposed to be ceremonial and far less influential than Lumumba’s role as prime minister, became one of behind-the-scenes plotting. During the immediate post-independence uprising, Kasa-Vubu took few actions and made few strong public statements, even as Lumumba appealed for international assistance from the Americans, the United Nations, and the Soviet Union. As pressure grew from the secessionist conflicts in Katanga and South Kasai and the Force Publique mutiny, events sponsored by Belgium, Kasa-Vubu sought to assemble conspirators willing to destabilize the government, secretly bringing together figures such as Moïse Tshombe, Harold Lynden, Albert Kalonji, Jean Bolikango, Joseph-Désiré Mobutu, and Joseph Iléo. Meanwhile, Kasa-Vubu came under internal pressure from ABAKO and President Fulbert Youlou of Congo-Brazzaville to restrain Lumumba. Publicly, he tried to appear as someone committed to balance and national unity, even broadcasting a national appeal on August 13 for unity and support for the government. However, his speeches, always in a mysterious and dubious tone, were intended to provoke destabilization:

If I am under a moral obligation to support and defend the government within the limits set by the law, the members of the government themselves have a duty to work together as a team. Their policy must be the policy of the government and not that of one party, one race, or one tribe. It must be a policy which reflects the interests of the nation and which allows humanitarian values to flourish in freedom. This imperative excludes all feelings of hatred, suspicion, and bad faith towards those who have collaborated loyally with us. It is also the duty of the government to respect the institutions which have been set up and to abide by the normal rules of democratic practice.

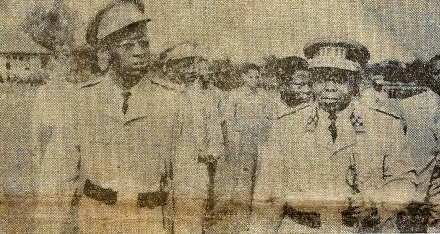
Kasa-Vubu with Colonel Joseph-Désiré Mobutu in 1961

On September 5, Kasa-Vubu dissolved Lumumba's democratically elected government, accusing him, without foundation, of "communist sympathies". It is worth noting that Kasa-Vubu was elected indirectly and disrespected the results of the polls. Lumumba refused to accept his resignation and announced Kasa-Vubu's resignation, provoking a political crisis that lasted until September 14. It was Kasa-Vubu who requested that army commander Joseph-Désiré Mobutu seize power and arrest Lumumba. Lumumba was subsequently handed over to Moïse Tshombe's secessionist state in Katanga and was assassinated. Thus, Kasa-Vubu was the main architect of the plot to assassinate Lumumba, linking the names of Mobutu, Harold Lynden and Tshombe, with financing from Western powers, which had interests in the Congo's natural resources.

Over the next five years, Kasa-Vubu presided over a succession of weak governments. After the end of the secession of Katanga, Kasa-Vubu appointed Tshombe as prime minister in July 1964 with a mandate to end the emerging Simba Rebellion. Tshombe recalled the exiled Katangese Gendarmerie and recruited white mercenaries, integrating them with the Armée Nationale Congolaise (ANC). Many of the mercenaries had fought for Katanga while Tshombe was the leader of that breakaway province. Despite the successes against the Simba rebels, Tshombe's prestige was damaged by his use of white mercenaries and western forces. Ultimately, Kasa-Vubu conspired to overthrow Tshombe (his former ally in the fall of Lumumba) himself and dismissed him as prime minister in October 1965.

Mobutu seized power for a second time on 25 November 1965, now deposing Kasa-Vubu and subsequently declaring himself head of state.

== Death ==
Mobutu placed Kasa-Vubu under house arrest before eventually allowing the deposed president to retire to his farm in Mayombe. Kasa-Vubu died in a hospital in Boma four years later in 1969, possibly after a long illness.

== Legacy ==
Kasa-Vubu's family went into exile following his death, first to Algeria and then Switzerland. One of his daughters, Justine M'Poyo Kasa-Vubu, eventually returned to the Congo (then called Zaire) in the 1990s. In 1997, she was appointed a cabinet minister by Laurent Kabila and then ambassador to Belgium. A bust of Kasa-Vubu's visage was erected on his tomb in September 2002 at the urging of his supporters.

Kasa-Vubu's role in Congolese history has been overshadowed in literature by Lumumba and Mobutu. Anthropologist Yolanda Covington-Ward wrote that, contrary to Lumumba's "privileged" position in historiography on Congolese nationalism, Kasa-Vubu and ABAKO were the primary "driving force" behind the independence movement.

== Honours ==
- Grand Cordon of the Order of Leopold, by King Baudouin, 30 June 1960
- Instituted and recognized as National Hero of the Democratic Republic of Congo on 30 June 2020
- Grand Cordon of the Order of the National Heroes Kabila-Lumumba, by Félix Tshisekedi, 3 October 2020

== Sources ==
- Bonyeka, Bomandeke (1992). Le Parlement congolais sous le régime de la Loi fondamentale (in French). Kinshasa: Presses universitaire du Zaire. OCLC 716913628. Archived from the original on 21 May 2024.
- Covington-Ward, Yolanda (January 2012). "Joseph Kasa-Vubu, ABAKO, and Performances of Kongo Nationalism in the Independence of Congo". Journal of Black Studies. 43 (1): 72–94. doi:10.1177/0021934711424491. ISSN 0021-9347. JSTOR 23215196. S2CID 144014323.
- De Groof, Matthias, ed. (2020). Lumumba in the Arts. Leuven: Leuven University Press. ISBN 9789462701748. Archived from the original on 21 May 2024.
- Doyle, Michael W.; Sambanis, Nicholas (2006). "Chapter 4: Making War". Making War and Building Peace: United Nations Peace Operations. Princeton, New Jersey: Princeton University Press. pp. 144–196. ISBN 978-0-691-12275-5.
- LaFontaine, J.S. (1986). City Politics: A Study of Léopoldville 1962–63. American Studies. Cambridge University Press Archive. Archived from the original on 16 January 2023.
- Hoskyns, Catherine (1965). The Congo Since Independence: January 1960 – December 1961. London: Oxford University Press. OCLC 414961.
- "Joseph Kasavubu Dies in Congo; Was His Nation's First President" (PDF). The New York Times. Reuters. 24 March 1969.
- "Kasa-Vubu (Joseph)" (PDF). Biographie belge d'outre-mer (in French). Vol. IX. Brussels: Académie Royale des Sciences d'Outre-Me. 2015. OCLC 561667718. Archived (PDF) from the original on 12 May 2017.
- Kisangani, Emizet Francois; Bobb, Scott F. (2010). Historical Dictionary of the Democratic Republic of the Congo (3rd ed.). Plymouth, UK: Scarecrow Press. ISBN 978-0-8108-5761-2. Archived from the original on 17 October 2023.
- Morris, Brian (2006). Religion and Anthropology: A Critical Introduction. Cambridge University Press. ISBN 9780521852418.
- Rich, Jeremy (2012). "Kasa-Vubu, Joseph (1915–1969)". In Akyeampong, Emmanuel Kwaku; Gates, Henry Louis (eds.). Dictionary of African Biography. Vol. 3. Oxford, England: Oxford University Press. pp. 302–304. ISBN 978-0-19-538207-5.
- Tanner, Henry. "The Patient African – Kasavubu" (PDF). New York Times. No. 26 February 1961. Archived (PDF) from the original on 21 May 2024.

Political offices
Preceded by Position created on independence from Belgium	President of the Republic of the Congo; 1960–1965	Succeeded by Mobutu Sese Seko
