= Court of Cassation (Democratic Republic of the Congo) =

Supreme court of the Democratic Republic of the Congo

Court of Cassation of the Democratic Republic of the Congo
- French: Cour de cassation de la République démocratique du Congo
- Jurisdiction: Democratic Republic of the Congo
- Location: Gombe, Kinshasa, Democratic Republic of the Congo
- Authorised by: Constitution of the Democratic Republic of the Congo
- Judge term length: Life tenure
- Number of positions: 30
- Language: French
- Website: https://cassation.cd/

First President of the Court of Cassation
- Currently: Elie-Léon Ndomba Kabeya
- Since: 14 September 2023

The Court of Cassation (French: Cour de cassation) is the main court of last resort in the Democratic Republic of the Congo. It is headquartered in Gombe, Kinshasa, within the Palace of Justice.

The court was established by the Constitution of 18 February 2006 and serves as the supreme authority on judicial legal matters. Its creation signaled a fundamental reform of the Congolese judicial system by replacing the former unified structure dominated by the Supreme Court of Justice. The Court of Cassation does not reassess facts as a third-instance court; rather, its mission is to uphold the rule of law by verifying that lower courts and tribunals have complied with legal provisions, procedural rules, and jurisdictional requirements. Through cassation appeals, it reviews the lawfulness of final judgments delivered by civil and military courts. The Court has original and final jurisdiction over offenses committed by several high-ranking political, administrative, and judicial officials, including members of Parliament, senior government officials other than the prime minister, judges of the highest courts, and provincial authorities. It may also hear, as a court of second instance, appeals against first-instance judgments delivered by Courts of Appeal in cases specifically provided for by law.

Institutionally, it exemplifies the independence and specialization of the judicial order under the 2006 Constitution, as it is devoted exclusively to judicial matters, unlike the former Supreme Court of Justice, which combined judicial, administrative, and constitutional functions. The First President of the Court of Cassation is a member of the General Assembly responsible for decisions falling within the competence of the Supreme Council of the Judiciary (Conseil supérieur de la magistrature, CSM). Per Congolese law, the compulsory retirement age for magistrates on the Court of Cassation is 70 years old.

== Legal framework ==
Created in 1982, the Supreme Court of Justice of the Democratic Republic of the Congo was, before the establishment of the Constitutional Court, the Court of Cassation, and the Council of State, the highest judicial authority in the country. It was established by Ordinance-Law No. 82-017 of 31 March 1982, governing procedure, and exercised this role until the enactment of Law No. 13/010 of 19 February 2013 on procedure before the Court of Cassation. Organic Law No. 13/011-B of 11 April 2013, which regulates the organization, functioning, and jurisdiction of courts within the judicial system, stipulated in Article 89 that the Supreme Court of Justice would continue to function in its existing structure until the Court of Cassation of the Democratic Republic of the Congo became fully operational. Article 6 of that law designates the Court of Cassation as the supreme court of the judicial order, which was a role previously held by the Supreme Court of Justice.

== History ==
The constitution promulgated on 18 February 2006 was prepared by the Transitional Senate, adopted by the National Assembly, approved by the Congolese people through the referendum of 18–19 December 2005, and enacted by President Joseph Kabila. After sixteen years marked by successive transitional regimes, the country was finally governed by a constitution adopted by its people. This constitution replaced the Transitional Constitution and brought about substantial changes in the organization and exercise of executive, legislative, and, most notably, judicial power. Under the Transitional Constitution, judicial power was exercised through courts and tribunals under the leadership of the Supreme Court of Justice, a body with broader powers than those of other jurisdictions. Historically, however, the Supreme Court did not originate with the Transitional Constitution. Its roots extend back to the Belgian law of 16 April 1889 and the Colonial Superior Council, which was based in Brussels. This Council functioned as an appellate and cassation body for decisions issued by Congolese courts and as an advisory institution to the Sovereign King. It was abolished on 2 March 1892 and replaced by the Belgian Court of Cassation, whose jurisdiction was expanded to cover colonial court decisions.

At independence, the Fundamental Law of 19 May 1960 maintained colonial legislation until formally repealed and ensured that the Belgian Court of Cassation would continue its functions until the Congo established its own cassation court. This happened in 1964 with the adoption of the Luluabourg Constitution, which created a national Supreme Court of Justice. The constitution of 18 February 2006, unlike the Transitional Constitution, established two distinct judicial orders: judicial courts and administrative courts, alongside an autonomous Constitutional Court. A supreme body leads each order — the Court of Cassation for the judicial order and the Council of State for the administrative order. In its explanatory memorandum, the constituent authority briefly outlines the reorganization of the judicial system:

"For greater efficiency, specialization, and speed in the handling of cases, the Courts and Tribunals have been divided into three judicial orders:

- the courts of the judicial order, placed under the supervision of the Court of Cassation;
- those of the administrative order, headed by the Council of State; and
- the Constitutional Court".

Organic Law No. 13/011-B of 11 April 2013, which regulates the organization, functioning, and jurisdiction of courts within the judicial system, stipulated in Article 89 that the Supreme Court of Justice would continue to function in its existing structure until the Court of Cassation of the Democratic Republic of the Congo became fully operational. Article 6 of that law designates the Court of Cassation as the supreme court of the judicial order, which was a role previously held by the Supreme Court of Justice. In this capacity, the Supreme Court of Justice had jurisdiction over cassation appeals against decisions rendered at second instance by Courts of Appeal, High Courts, Commercial Courts, the appeal chambers of Juvenile Courts established under Law No. 09/001 of 10 January 2009 on child protection, as well as Labor Courts; applications for annulment of administrative decisions issued at first instance by Courts of Appeal; criminal prosecutions, at first and final instance, of public officials enjoying jurisdictional privilege; appeals against criminal judgments delivered at first instance by Courts of Appeal; and any additional powers assigned by law pending the full establishment of the Court of Cassation and the Constitutional Court.

In line with the constitutional reorganization introduced by the Constitution of 18 February 2006, which divided the judiciary into three separate systems to improve efficiency and specialization, the Supreme Court of Justice was definitively dissolved in 2018. Its powers were transferred to the Constitutional Court, the Court of Cassation, and the Council of State, while all civil and military courts within the judicial system were placed under the authority of the Court of Cassation.

== Court structure and jurisdiction ==
=== Jurisdiction ===
Article 153, paragraphs 2 and 3, of the constitution of the Third Republic defines the powers of the Court of Cassation. The Court has jurisdiction over:

- appeals in cassation against final judgments and rulings issued by civil and military courts and tribunals;
- offenses committed by certain high-ranking officials, over which it exercises original and final jurisdiction, including members of Parliament, members of the government other than the prime minister, members and judges of the constitutional court, the court of cassation, the council of state, and the court of auditors, as well as senior judicial officers, provincial authorities, and presidents of provincial assemblies.

The prosecution and indictment of government members require an absolute majority vote of the National Assembly, in accordance with its Rules of Procedure, and any indicted government member must resign. The court of cassation also hears second-instance appeals against judgments rendered at first instance by the courts of appeal. As the highest court of the judicial order, which includes civil and military courts and tribunals, it has jurisdiction throughout the national territory, although it adjudicates only judicial matters involving private individuals.

The Court of Cassation shares many characteristics with the former Supreme Court of Justice, particularly its judicial section. It appears to have inherited the powers of that section. However, notable differences exist, as unlike the Judicial section of the Supreme Court, the Court of Cassation does not have criminal jurisdiction over the president of the republic. In addition, several categories of officials, such as the prime minister, provincial ministers, and presidents of provincial assemblies, were not mentioned in the Transitional Constitution, while new institutions created by the 2006 constitution, including the Constitutional Court and the Council of State, are expressly covered. Positions linked to the transition, such as vice-presidents and leaders of transitional institutions, no longer exist under the current constitutional framework.

=== Composition and administration ===
The Court of Cassation is composed of a First President, Presidents, and Judges (Counsellors). The First President is responsible for the administration of the Court and establishes its internal rules by ordinance. Élie-Léon Ndomba Kabeya was appointed First President (premier président) pursuant to Judicial Organization Order No. 23/168 of 15 August 2023 and formally assumed office after taking the oath on 14 September 2023 before President Félix Tshisekedi.

First Presidents of the former Supreme Court of Justice and the Court of Cassation:

| No. | Name | Title | Term of office |
|---|---|---|---|
| 1 | Marcel Lihau | Premier président de la Cour Suprême de Justice | 1968–1975 |
| 2 | Nicolas Bayona Ba Meya | Premier président de la Cour Suprême de Justice | 1975–1986 |
| 3 | Evariste Kalala Ilunga | Premier président de la Cour Suprême de Justice | 1986 (a few months) |
| 4 | Gérard Balanda Mikuin Leliel | Premier président de la Cour Suprême de Justice | 1986–1998 |
| 5 | Bruno Mbiango Kekese | Premier président de la Cour Suprême de Justice | 1998–2003 |
| 6 | Benoît Lwamba Bindu | Premier président de la Cour Suprême de Justice | 2003–2007 |
| 7 | Étienne Roger Tikamanyire Bin Ndigeba | Premier président de la Cour Suprême de Justice | 2007–2009 |
| 8 | Gervais Bemwizi Kyenga | Premier président de la Cour Suprême de Justice | 2009–2010 |
| 9 | Jérôme Kitoko Kimpele | Premier président de la Cour Suprême de Justice et de Cassation | 2010–2020 |
| 10 | Dominique Ntambwe wa Kaniki Biselela | Premier président de la Cour de Cassation | 7 February – 29 June 2020 |
| 11 | David Christophe Mukendi Musanga | Premier président de la Cour de Cassation | June 2020 – September 2023 |
| 12 | Élie-Léon Ndomba Kabeya | Premier président de la Cour de Cassation | 14 September 2023 – present |

The provisions of Article 20 of the Organic Law governing the organization, functioning, and jurisdiction of courts within the judicial order apply mutatis mutandis to the Court of Cassation. On the basis of the quality of their scholarly publications, the High Council of the Judiciary (Conseil supérieur de la magistrature) may designate certain sitting and prosecutorial magistrates to serve as referendary counsellors at the Court. These counsellors support the judges of the Court and the Office of the Prosecutor General in carrying out their functions and are appointed in accordance with the statute governing magistrates. The First President is supported by a private office (cabinet), whose members are appointed by him. The registry is directed by a Chief Registrar holding the rank of Secretary General of the Public Administration (Secrétaire général de l'Administration publique), assisted by one or more registrars.

==== Chambers ====
Pursuant to Article 31 of the Organic Law governing courts of the judicial order under review, the Court of Cassation is composed of three formations:

- Chambers: With regard to the chambers, Article 32 of the same Organic Law provides that the Court has four chambers, each composed of five members. The chambers are:
  - the Chamber for cassation appeals in civil matters;
  - the Chamber for cassation appeals in commercial matters;
  - the Chamber for cassation appeals in social matters, as well as special procedures before the Court of Cassation; and
  - the Chamber for cassation appeals in criminal matters and for appeals against criminal judgments rendered at first instance by Courts of Appeal.
- Restricted chambers (formations restreintes): Each chamber includes a restricted panel of three members appointed by the First President. Restricted chambers rule on:
  - appeals that are manifestly inadmissible; or
  - cases that clearly fall outside the Court’s jurisdiction.

A restricted chamber may, where appropriate, refer a case back to the ordinary formation of the chamber.

- Joint chambers (chambres réunies): When sitting jointly, the Court is composed of all chamber Presidents and the most senior counsellor from each chamber. This formation is convened and presided over by the First President, includes at least seven members, and always sits in an odd number. The joint chambers hear, among other matters, appeals raising issues of principle, complex cases likely to generate divergent solutions, matters involving non-compliance with a legal position previously decided by the Court, appeals following cassation, appeals brought by the attorney general at the request of the Minister of Justice and Keeper of the Seals, appeals in the sole interest of the law, repeated cassation appeals involving the same parties and cause, referrals after cassation in cases of flagrant or presumed intentional offences, questions involving a reversal of jurisprudence, and, on the merits at first and last instance, offences committed by persons enjoying jurisdictional privilege. In all cases, the Court sits with the participation of the Public Prosecutor's Office and the assistance of the registry.

=== Public prosecutor's office ===
A public prosecutor's office (Ministère public) operates at every court. At the Court of Cassation, it is headed by an attorney general, assisted by one or more First Advocates General and Advocates General. The public prosecutor's office ensures compliance with legislative and regulatory provisions and the enforcement of judicial decisions, particularly where public order is concerned; exercises supervision over judicial police officers and certain officials involved in the administration of justice, subject to legally defined exceptions; and attends hearings of the Court of Cassation without taking part in deliberations. In criminal matters, it is responsible for investigating offences, receiving complaints and denunciations, carrying out investigative measures, and bringing cases before the courts.

Under the organic law, members of the public prosecutor's office are placed under the authority of the Minister of Justice and Keeper of the Seals, who may issue instructions through the attorney general at the Court of Cassation or at the Courts of Appeal, without interfering in the conduct of prosecutions. The attorney general at the Court of Cassation carries out prosecution functions before the Court, may, upon instruction of the Minister, support public action before courts at all levels, exercises supervisory and inspection authority over the Prosecutor General's Offices at the Courts of Appeal within defined limits, and ensures internal discipline and organization within the public prosecutor's office at the Court of Cassation.

=== Bar association ===
The bar association (Ordre des avocats) is the professional body responsible for organizing, regulating, and representing lawyers practicing before Congolese courts and tribunals. It safeguards the independence of the legal profession, maintains professional ethics, and ensures the right to legal defense. Within the Congolese judicial system, bar associations are territorially organized and attached to specific courts. This includes the bar association at the Court of Cassation, which brings together lawyers authorized to plead before the highest court of the judicial order. Bar associations exist alongside Courts of Appeal and other major courts and tribunals, with each bar's jurisdiction corresponding to that of the court to which it is attached.

=== Procedure and decision-making principles ===
Court deliberations are confidential, and decisions are adopted by majority vote. The organic law provides special rules for cases in which deliberations produce more than two differing opinions, particularly in criminal proceedings. Once a case is taken under advisement, the chamber sets a date for the delivery of judgment. Decisions must be rendered within 30 days in civil, commercial, and social matters, and within 10 days in criminal cases, subject to limited extensions authorized by a reasoned order. In all proceedings, the Court sits with the participation of the public prosecutor's office and the assistance of the clerk.

=== Judicial calendar and ceremonial opening ===
Judicial holidays run from 15 August to 15 October, during which only urgent hearings and decisions are held, although criminal investigations and trials may not be suspended or delayed. Each year on 15 October, the Court of Cassation has a solemn public session during which the First President delivers an address, the attorney general presents a legal submission, and the President of the bar association near the Court of Cassation speaks.

== See also ==
- Constitutional Court of the Democratic Republic of the Congo
