= Council of State (Democratic Republic of the Congo) =

Supreme administrative court of the Democratic Republic of the Congo

- French: Conseil d'État de la république démocratique du Congo
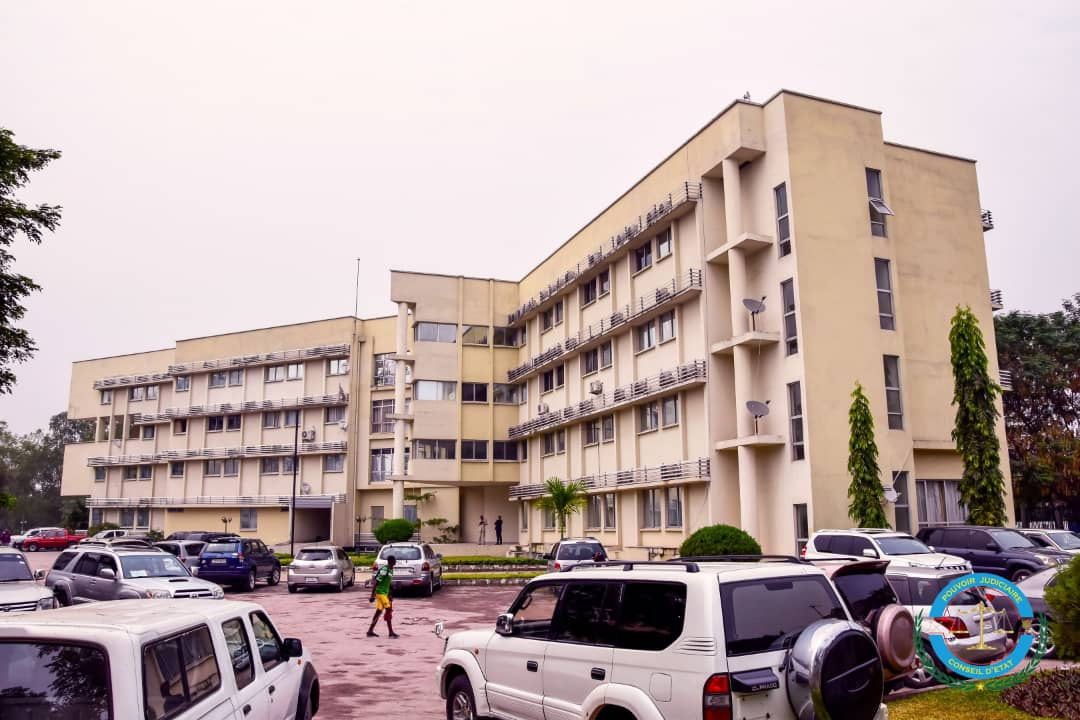
- Headquarters of the Council of State in Gombe, Kinshasa

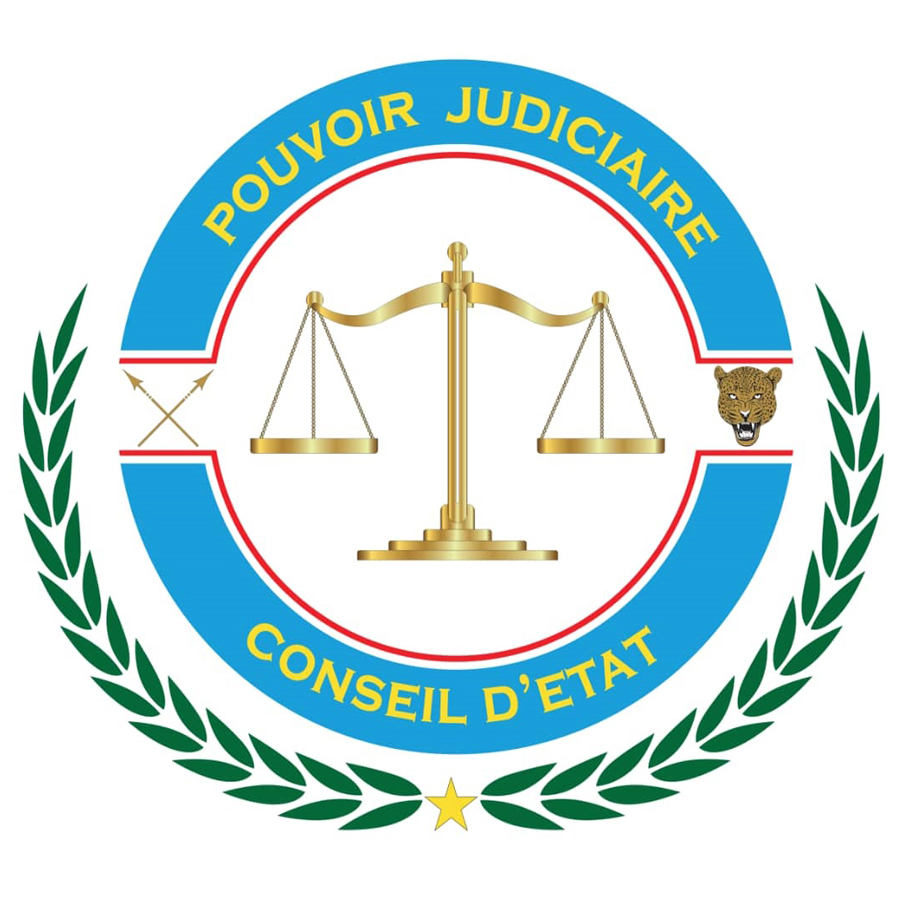
- Location: Gombe, Kinshasa, Democratic Republic of the Congo
- Authorised by: Constitution of the Democratic Republic of the Congo
- Appeals from: Administrative Courts of Appeal
- Judge term length: Governed by the statute of magistrates
- Annual budget: FC 30.66 billion (2026; ▼3.85% from 2025)
- Language: French
- Type of tribunal: Supreme administrative court
- Website: conseildetat.cd

First President
- Currently: Brigitte Nsensele Wa Nsensele
- Since: 12 February 2025

Prosecutor General
- Currently: Jean-Paul Mukolo Nkokesha
- Since: 12 February 2025

First Advocate General
- Currently: Rose Mutombo Kiese
- Since: 12 February 2025

The Council of State (French: Conseil d'État) is the supreme administrative court in the Democratic Republic of the Congo and the leading authority within the country's administrative court system. Before its establishment, the Supreme Court of Justice, created under Ordinance-Law No. 82-017 of 31 March 1982, served as the country's highest judicial authority under the Transitional Constitution and earlier constitutional frameworks.

The Constitution of 18 February 2006 introduced major changes to the judiciary by creating two separate court systems: the judicial order and the administrative order, alongside an independent Constitutional Court. The Court of Cassation became the highest court in the judicial order, while the Council of State assumed the same role in the administrative order. However, the Supreme Court of Justice continued to operate under Organic Law No. 13/011-B of 11 April 2013 until the new courts became operational. In June 2018, a presidential decree dissolved the former Supreme Court of Justice, allowing the Council of State to begin its functions.

The Council of State performs both judicial and advisory duties through separate sections with their own responsibilities. Its consultative section provides legal advice to Parliament and the Government, while its administrative section mainly handles legal disputes involving public authorities and also carries out certain advisory functions. The Council hears cases challenging the legality of decisions and regulations issued by central administrative authorities, reviews appeals from administrative courts of appeal, and considers compensation claims involving exceptional financial or non-financial harm caused by national, provincial, or local authorities when no other court has jurisdiction.

== History ==
Established in 1982, the Supreme Court of Justice of the Democratic Republic of the Congo served as the country's highest judicial authority before the creation of the Council of State of the Democratic Republic of the Congo, the Constitutional Court of the Democratic Republic of the Congo, and the Court of Cassation of the Democratic Republic of the Congo. It was instituted by Ordinance-Law No. 82-017 of 31 March 1982, which regulated judicial procedure. Under the Transitional Constitution, judicial authority was exercised by courts and tribunals under the leadership of the Supreme Court of Justice.

The constitution adopted on 18 February 2006 departed from this model by establishing two separate judicial orders, judicial and administrative, alongside an independent Constitutional Court, each headed by a supreme body: the Court of Cassation for the judicial order and the Council of State for the administrative order. The Supreme Court of Justice continued operating until the adoption of Law No. 13/010 of 19 February 2013 on procedure before the Court of Cassation, while Organic Law No. 13/011-B of 11 April 2013 provided that it would remain in place until the new courts became fully functional.

Organic Law No. 16-027 of 15 October 2016 implemented Article 155 of the 2006 constitution by formally creating an autonomous administrative judicial system, structured around the Council of State, Administrative Courts of Appeal, and Administrative Tribunals, and recognizing specialized administrative jurisdictions governed by separate legislation. The Council of State began operations in June 2018 following a presidential decree that dissolved the former Supreme Court of Justice by appointing the new heads of the Council of State and its prosecutors.

== Organization ==
The Organic Law No. 16-027 of 15 October 2016 is essentially the foundational law that creates, organizes, and governs the entire administrative court system. The law implements Article 155 of the 2006 Constitution by formally establishing an autonomous administrative judicial order, separate from ordinary (judicial) courts and from the Constitutional Court. The law organizes the administrative judiciary into three main levels:

- Council of State (Conseil d'État) as the highest administrative court in the country that handles major administrative cases, cassation, appeals, and advisory opinions;
- Administrative Courts of Appeal (Cours administratives d'appel) that hear appeals from administrative tribunals and also act as first-instance courts for some provincial matters;
- Administrative Tribunals (Tribunaux administratifs) as Courts of first instance for most administrative disputes.

=== Relationship with the administrative section of the former Supreme Court of Justice ===
Article 155 of the constitution of 18 February 2006 largely reproduces the substance of Articles 147, 148, and 158 of the Code of Judicial Organization and Jurisdiction (Code de l'organisation et de la compétence judiciaires; COCJ), which governed the powers of the administrative section of the former Supreme Court of Justice. However, the constituent authority did not retain the final portion of Article 147 of the COCJ, which extended annulment powers to acts and regulations of decentralized entities placed under the supervision of central authorities.

Although the council of state may exercise powers comparable to those of the former administrative section, it differs fundamentally in legal nature. The council of state is an autonomous court heading an entire judicial order, rather than a mere chamber within a single court. Within the administrative judicial hierarchy, it represents the third level, following administrative tribunals and administrative courts of appeal. By contrast, the administrative section of the Supreme Court of Justice constituted only the second level, as lower tribunals did not exercise administrative jurisdiction.

The designation "council of state" confers significant institutional prestige. Nevertheless, Professor Félix Vunduawe Te Pemako, in his Traité de droit administratif, strongly criticizes this choice of terminology. He argues that the name, borrowed from the French legal system, is inappropriate given its deep historical roots in France. The French council of state originated as a body of the royal court that advised the monarch and later, with the French Revolution, evolved into an institution serving the republican state. In the Congolese context, the professor maintains that the term "council of state" is therefore ill-suited and that the institution should instead have been named the High Administrative Court (Haute cour administrative), since its primary function is the adjudication of administrative disputes, unlike the French Council of State, which also plays a substantial advisory role.

=== Composition and administration ===
The Council of State is composed of a First President, Presidents, and Councilors. The advisory section, made up of three chambers divided according to subject matter, includes several judges, including the Section President, the Chamber Presidents, and the Councilors, all expressly appointed and assigned to their posts by decision of the First President of the Council of State. The litigation section, made up of six chambers divided according to subject matter, includes several judges, including the Section President, the Chamber Presidents, and the Councilors, all expressly appointed and assigned to their posts by decision of the First President of the Council of State.

==== First President ====
The internal structure of the Council of State is centered on the Office (Cabinet) of the First President, which functions as the institution's main administrative and coordination body. This Office includes a director of cabinet, supported by two deputy directors of cabinet, as well as several specialized units (cellules), notably those responsible for:

- Legal affairs: Coordinates all legal and judicial matters handled by the Office of the First President. It supervises advisory opinions, contentious case monitoring, relations with other jurisdictions, and liaison with the High Council of the Judiciary.
- Administration and finance: Manages human resources, logistics, accounting, discipline, and the financial administration of the Council of State. It also oversees procurement, asset management, and internal services.
- Budget: Prepares and monitors the execution of the budget of the Council of State and, more broadly, of administrative jurisdictions. It works in coordination with budgetary control authorities and credit managers.
- Information and communication: Responsible for institutional communication, media relations, press monitoring, and information technology systems, including the management of the Council of State's digital platforms.

The Office also coordinates with the offices of the presidents of sections.

Brigitte Nsensele Wa Nsensele was appointed First President by decree on 16 January 2025 and assumed office on 12 February, succeeding Marthe Odio Nonde, who had been appointed to the position on 30 July 2022, herself having replaced Félix Vunduawe Te Pemako, the inaugural First President installed on 12 June 2018.

==== Sections and chambers ====
The Council of State is made up of two sections: an advisory section and a litigation section, each subdivided into one or more chambers. Every section includes a section president, chamber presidents, and councilors. The section president, appointed, suspended, replaced, or removed by decision of the First President, allocates cases assigned by the First President among the chambers, after conducting any necessary preliminary investigations. In urgent matters, the First President assigns cases directly to the competent chambers, which then carry out the investigation and prepare them for adjudication. The litigation section consists of six chambers:

- the administrative chamber (legality review and compensation for exceptional damage);
- the public finance and taxation chamber (tax, parafiscal, customs, public finance, procurement, and public works disputes of the central government);
- the social affairs chamber (disputes involving state employees and civil servants, including pensions, salaries, and social benefits);
- the elections, political parties, and professional organizations chamber (non-presidential and non-legislative electoral disputes, and matters concerning political and professional organizations);
- the economic affairs chamber (economic, technical, and competition-related disputes);
- general affairs chamber, which handles all matters not expressly assigned elsewhere.

Within each section, chambers serve as the basic judicial and consultative units, composed of a chamber president and several councilors. Deliberations involve members who took part in the investigation, and if a chamber lacks a quorum, additional councilors may be called. Appeals for annulment of acts or decisions of central administrative authorities are transmitted by the First President to the litigation section or, in urgent cases, directly to the competent chamber president, with notification to the concerned authority. Cases may be referred to the plenary session of a section or to the plenary assembly of the Council of State at the request of designated authorities, including the First President, section or chamber presidents, or the public prosecutor's office.

The advisory section is composed of a section president, chamber presidents, and councilors, and is organized into three chambers: the opinions chamber, the legal text interpretation chamber, and the studies and permanent inspection chamber.

==== The plenary assembly ====
The plenary assembly brings together all serving judges and is presided over by the First President. It deliberates on issues affecting the institution as a whole and, where appropriate, on matters falling within the competence of a particular section or chamber. The plenary assembly meets automatically when there is a need to reconsider settled case law, resolve conflicts of jurisdiction, or decide, by judgment, on questions of principle. The First President ensures the administration and internal order of the Council of State by drafting its internal rules of procedure, distributing cases between sections or chambers, supervising registry personnel, and managing the operational budget of the administrative courts as the delegated authorizing officer.

The Council of State is supported by a registry composed of a chief registrar, principal and divisional registrars, registrars, and bailiffs, and it sits with the participation of the public prosecutor's office and the assistance of a registrar. In the event of absence or incapacity of the First President, duties are assumed by the most senior section or chamber president, who is in turn replaced, according to seniority, by the most senior judge.

==== Bureau ====
The bureau consists of the First President, the attorney general, the presidents, and the senior advocates general. It serves as a consultative and decision-support body assisting the First President and the attorney general in ensuring the effective and orderly management of the Council of State and other administrative courts. Lacking judicial authority, the bureau cannot replace a chamber, a section, or the plenary assembly. It approves the council's internal rules of procedure and, at the end of each year, prepares a comprehensive report on the activities of the administrative courts and attached prosecution services for submission to the President of the High Council of the Judiciary, who forwards it to the Minister of Justice and Keeper of the Seals. This report reviews court activity, procedural progress, processing times, and underlines interpretative difficulties in legal texts, while proposing possible improvements.
