= Lihau =

Lihau is a surname that may refer to:

- Jean-Pierre Lihau (born 1975), politician and government minister in the Democratic Republic of the Congo
- Marcel Lihau (1931–1999), Congolese jurist, law professor and politician, inaugural president of the Democratic Republic of the Congo
- Sophie Lihau-Kanza (1940–1999), Congolese politician and sociologist, inaugural first lady of the Democratic Republic of the Congo

== See also ==
- Lihou
- Lihue, Hawaii
