= Ministry of Justice and Keeper of the Seals (Democratic Republic of the Congo) =

Government ministry of the Democratic Republic of the Congo

Department overview
- Jurisdiction: Democratic Republic of the Congo
- Headquarters: Kinshasa
- Minister responsible: Guillaume Ngefa-Atondoko Andali

The Ministry of Justice and Keeper of the Seals of the Democratic Republic of the Congo (French: Ministère de la Justice et Garde des Sceaux de la République Démocratique du Congo) is the government body responsible for administering justice and safeguarding fundamental rights nationwide. It oversees the functioning of the judiciary through its departments and services, with a mandate to "promote a system that is equitable, transparent, and accessible to all citizens". Its responsibilities include law enforcement, maintaining public order, and promoting justice and equality, while also leading efforts to reform legal and institutional structures to improve governance and uphold the rule of law.

== Functions and responsibilities ==
The Ministry oversees the implementation of the government's judicial policy through the courts, tribunals, and the offices of the public prosecutor, exercises control over judicial activities, supervises judicial personnel, and monitors the progress of institutional reforms.

In accordance with various organic laws and statutory codes, the ministry ensures the organization and functioning of the judicial system, including the application of the Organic Law of 2013 on the jurisdiction and functioning of courts, the 2006 statute governing magistrates, the Penal Code, the Civil and Commercial Codes, the Codes of Criminal and Civil Procedure, the 2009 Child Protection Act, and the 2016 Organic Law on administrative jurisdictions. The ministry is also responsible for matters relating to nationality.

Beyond the courts, it manages notarial services, public-interest sequestrations, and the policing of cemeteries. It supervises religious associations, non-profit organizations, and public utility establishments, as well as the penitentiary system, including conditional release. The ministry also processes petitions for pardon, preserves official copies of legal texts and international treaties, and safeguards specimens of the Republic's seals. It defends the interests of the Congolese state before national, foreign, and international jurisdictions, and coordinates the activities of the censorship commission for songs and performances in collaboration with the ministries responsible for culture, the arts, and the media.

The ministry additionally manages several specialized bodies, including the Permanent Commission for the Reform of Congolese Law (Commission permanente de réforme du droit congolais), the Commission for the Management of Seized and Confiscated Assets (Commission de Gestion des Biens Saisis et Confisqués; COGEBISCO), the Documentation and Studies Service, the Higher School of the Magistracy, the General Inspectorate of Judicial and Penitentiary Services (Inspectorat Général des Services Judiciaires et Pénitentiaires), the National OHADA Commission, and the One-Stop Business Creation Office (Guichet Unique de Création d'Entreprise).

== List of ministers ==
- Rémy Mwamba (1960)
- Marcel Lihau (1960–1961)
- Rémy Mwamba (1961–1962)
- Jean-Chrysostome Weregemere (1962)
- Justin Marie Bomboko (1963-1965)
- N'Singa Udjuu (1966-1968)
- Étienne Tshisekedi (1968-1969)
- Thomas Lwango (1969)
- Bruno Ndala (1969-1970)
- Muyembe Kanza Tshibangu (1972)
- A'Dokpe Lingo Nzondomio (1973-1974) [referred to as the State Commissioner for Justice]
- Kabuita Nyamabu (1975-1976) [referred to as the State Commissioner for Justice]
- Mulenda Shamwenge Mutebi (1976-1977) [referred to as the State Commissioner for Justice]
- Mampuya Kanunk' a-Tshiabo (1977) [referred to as the State Commissioner for Justice]
- Mozagba Ngbuka Bamangwa (1980-1981) [referred to as the State Commissioner for Justice]
- Inonga Lokongo L'Ome (1981-1982) [referred to as the State Commissioner for Justice]
- Vunduawe Te Pamako (1982) [referred to as the State Commissioner for Justice]
- Mazanga Ngbuka Bomanga (1983) [referred to as the State Commissioner for Justice]
- Gerard Kamanda Wa Kamanda (1984) [referred to as the State Commissioner for Justice]
- Bayona Ba Meya (1984-1985) [referred to as the State Commissioner for Justice]
- Mobutu Sese Seko (1985-1986) [referred to as the State Commissioner for Justice]
- Singa Udjuu (1986-1988) [referred to as the State Commissioner for Justice]
- Mayabo Nkulu (1991)
- Mokuba (1992)
- Roger Glaanga (1993)
- Gerard Kamanda Wa Kamanda (1994)
- N'Singa Udjuu (1994-1997)
- Celestin Lwangi (1997-1998)
- Mwenze Kongolo (1998-2001)
- Ngele Masudi (2001-2003)
- Honorius Kisimba Ngoy (2003-2006)
- Pierre Ilunga Bundu wa Biluba (2006-2007)
- Mutombo Bakafwa Nsenda (2007-2008)
- Luzolo Bambi Lessa (2008-2012)
- Wivine Mumba Matipa (2012-2015)
- Alexis Thambwe Mwamba (2016–2019)
- Rose Mutombo Kiese (2021–2024)

== See also ==
- Justice ministry
- Democratic Republic of Congo
