= Constitutional Court Building (Kinshasa) =

Constitutional Court Building in Gombe, Kinshasa

- Bâtiment de la Cour constitutionnelle (French)

General information
- Status: Completed
- Type: Courthouse
- Architectural style: Pyramidal design
- Location: Place Royale, Avenue Mwene-Ditu, Gombe, Kinshasa, Democratic Republic of the Congo
- Year built: 2023–2025
- Construction started: 29 August 2023; 3 years ago
- Completed: June 2025; 1 year ago
- Cost: $1.13 million
- Owner: Government of the Democratic Republic of the Congo

Technical details
- Floor count: 3

Design and construction
- Architecture firm: GreenStudio & Partners
- Main contractor: MBTP SA

The Constitutional Court Building (French: Bâtiment de la Cour constitutionnelle) is the headquarters of the Constitutional Court of the Democratic Republic of the Congo, located at Place Royale in Gombe, Kinshasa. The construction began on 29 August 2023, when President Félix Tshisekedi laid the foundation stone. The project was funded jointly by the Congolese government, the United Nations Development Programme (UNDP), and Sweden, with reported contributions totaling approximately US$1.13 million. The building features a pyramidal design inspired by Mount Nyiragongo in eastern Democratic Republic of the Congo.

== History ==
=== Background ===
The Constitutional Court started operating as an independent institution in 2015 under the 2006 Constitution. In 2020, the United Nations Development Programme (UNDP) proposed a project to build a new court building as part of the United Nations Joint Programme in Support of Justice Reform. The project was first planned as a library, but it was later changed to include courtrooms and offices.

The project officially began on 29 August 2023, when President Félix Tshisekedi laid the foundation stone at Place Royale in Gombe. That same month, Constitutional Court president Dieudonné Kamuleta Badibanga said that the Congolese government would pay 65% of the cost, while the UNDP would cover the remaining 35%. He reported that US$780,000 from the government and US$420,000 from the UNDP had been released. However, a UNDP report published in July 2025 listed US$733,000 from the Congolese government, US$185,000 from the UNDP, and US$214,422.39 from Sweden.

The construction was first expected to take ten months, but later reports gave a twelve-month deadline. In August 2024, Kamuleta visited the site to review the progress. MBTP SA, the construction company, reported that the final work was underway, including floor tiling, exterior painting, electrical wiring, and air-conditioning installation. GreenStudio & Partners, a Congolese architectural firm, oversee the work.

=== Completion and handover ===
The UNDP handed over the new building to Kamuleta in June 2025. Both Kamuleta and Damien Mama, the UNDP's Resident Representative in the DRC, signed the official handover report.

The building has a pyramid-shaped design inspired by Mount Nyiragongo. The building includes a main courtroom, additional hearing rooms, offices for the Court's president and staff, a library, a secretariat, and meeting spaces.
