= Pauline Maata Nkumu =

Congolese politician (born 1942)

Member of the National Assembly
- In office 2011–2018
- Constituency: Makanza

Member of the Central Committee of the Popular Movement of the Revolution
- In office 2 September 1980 – 24 April 1985

State Commissioner of Commerce
- In office 2 May 1975 – 4 February 1976

State Commissioner of Culture and Arts
- In office 6 January 1975 – 2 May 1975

State Commissioner of Labour and Social Affairs
- In office 7 March 1974 – 6 January 1975

State Commissioner of Posts, Telephone, and Telecommunications
- In office 17 October 1973 – 7 March 1974

Minister of Social Affairs
- In office 2 July 1971 – 17 October 1973

Personal details
- Born: 25 August 1942 (age 83) Léopoldville, Central Congo district, Leopoldville province, Belgian Congo (present-day Kinshasa, DR Congo)
- Party: Popular Movement of the Revolution (formerly)
- Education: Institute of Higher Education in Social Communications
- Occupation: Politician, businesswoman
- Awards: Commander of the National Order of the Leopard

Pauline Maata Nkumu wa Bowango Anganda Diono (born 25 August 1942) is a Congolese stateswoman and businesswoman. She served in various ministerial positions in the government of Zaire (now the Democratic Republic of the Congo) between 1971 and 1976, holding key roles in education, social affairs, telecommunications, labour, culture, and commerce. After leaving the government, she became a prominent business figure, benefiting from the government's Zairianisation policy.

She returned to government as a member of the National Assembly for the Makanza constituency of Equateur province, serving from 2011 to 2018. She has been actively involved in the Federation of Congolese Enterprises (FEC) and received the National Order of the Leopard for her contributions to public service.

== Early life and education ==
Pauline Maata Nkumu wa Bowango Anganda Diono was born on 25 August 1942 to a Libinza family in Léopoldville (present-day Kinshasa), Central Congo district, Léopoldville province. She completed her secondary education at the Sacred Heart of Mbanza Mboma High School before travelling to Belgium to enroll at the Institute of Higher Education in Social Communications in Tournai. She graduated in 1968 with a bachelor's degree in social communication, specialising in journalism.

== Career ==
Upon returning to Léopoldville, by then renamed Kinshasa, Nkumu began her political career on 5 March 1969, as deputy director of the cabinet of Sophie Kanza, the minister of social affairs. She served in this position until 15 November 1969. She subsequently served as deputy director and later cabinet director under Jean-Jacques Kande, the minister of information, until Kande's resignation on 7 December 1969.

On 2 July 1971, Nkumu became the deputy minister of education, responsible for primary education. She later served as the minister of social affairs until 17 October 1973, and was then appointed state commissioner (minister) of posts, telephone, and telecommunications. From 7 March 1974 to 6 January 1975, she served as the state commissioner of labour and social affairs, followed by a tenure as state commissioner of culture and arts from 6 January to 2 May 1975. She then held the position of state commissioner of commerce until 4 February 1976. In total, she had served in the Congolese executive council for five years and five months.

Following her departure from government, Nkumu began business ventures, benefiting from the government's Zairianisation policy. She acquired various assets, including plantations, cattle ranches, poultry and pig farms, ships, vehicles, and agricultural processing facilities.

On 2 September 1980, she became a member of the central committee of the Popular Movement of the Revolution (MPR), the ruling party at the time. She was subsequently elected to the economic and financial commission. Between March 1981 and March 1983, she served as the second secretary rapporteur of the central committee office while concurrently holding the position of state commissioner of posts, telephone, and telecommunications from 9 October 1981 to 18 March 1983. During her tenure, the government's stake in Masina Wireless was sold, leading to disputes over land distribution. She later returned to her previous role as state commissioner of social affairs from 18 March to 1 November 1983. She remained an MPR central committee member after her departure from government, until 24 April 1985.

Nkumu remained absent from politics from 1990 to 2010, focusing on her business endeavours. Despite facing financial difficulties, she retained her real estate assets. She remained a member of the National Association of Zairean Enterprises (ANEZA) and later the Federation of Congolese Enterprises (FEC), eventually serving as vice chair of an FEC committee.

In the 2011 general election, she was elected to the National Assembly as a representative of the Makanza constituency of Equateur province. In the National Assembly, she served as first vice-chair of the parliamentary group Democratic Republican Alliance and as a member of the Commission of Sages. She did not run for re-election in the 2018 general election.

== Honours ==
- National Order of the Leopard (Commander, promoted from Officer)
