= Elisabeth Mweya Tol'Ande =

Journalist and poet from the DRC

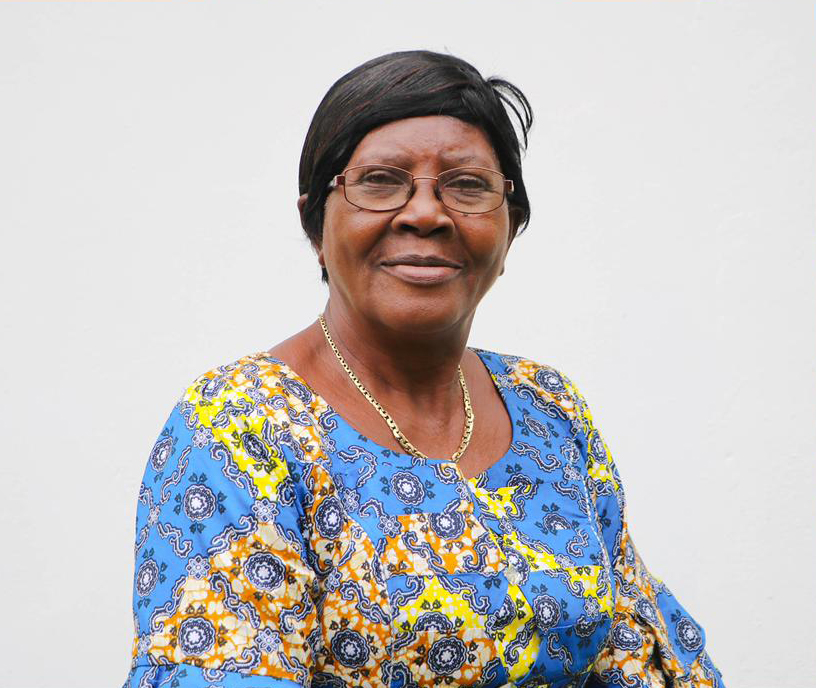
- Born: 7 July 1947 (age 78) Kinshasa, Democratic Republic of the Congo
- Occupation: Writer; journalist
- Language: French
- Genre: Poetry; short stories; essays

Elisabeth Françoise Mweya Tol'Ande (born 7 July 1947) is a poet and journalist from Kinshasa, Democratic Republic of the Congo.

Tol'Ande was the winner of the Sébastien Ngonso Prize for Poetry in 1967 and the Mobuto Seseko Prize for Poetry in 1972. She received the Bronze Medal of Arts, Science and Letters Merit (French: Médaille du mérite des Arts, Sciences et Lettres) in 1970.

== Early life and education ==
Tol'Ande was born in Kinshasa on 7 July 1947. Her mother made money by selling food at the market, and her father was a mechanic. She began studying at a Catholic school (Lycée Marie-Thérèse de Lisieux) at age ten, and developed an interest in becoming a nun. She entered a Catholic convent in 1965, but was dismissed "because of an indiscretion". After leaving the convent, she pursued a State Diploma in Literature (completed 1969) and a Diploma in Journalism (completed 1984).

== Career ==
Tol'Ande was a journalist with Afrique chrétienne, Progrés and Salongo. She also worked on Magazine de la femme - F... Comme Femme.

She was an assistant professor at the Institut des Sciences et Techniques de l'Information.

In 1985, she worked for an African developmental organization as a teacher. This experience led her to found an organization in 1990 focused on women's initiatives in the country, La Fondation DIRAF/Esther's Vision.

== Personal life ==
Mweya Tol'ande has seven children and several grandchildren. She is an Evangelical Christian.

== Publications ==
- Parole de Femmes, a bulletin of liaison
- "Moi, Femme je parle". Editions Grain de Sel. (essay)
- "Ahata, suivi du Récit de la Damnée". Editions Bobiso. 1976. (short story)
- "Remous de Feuilles". Editions du Mont Noir. 1974. (poetry)
- "Vision institutionelle de Diraf". Editions de Diraf.
- La vie comme elle va/Les récits d’ici et d’ailleurs. Editions Grand Lac de Kinshasa. 2024. (Narrative memoir)
