= Order of the National Heroes Kabila-Lumumba =

Highest order of the Democratic Republic of the Congo

Order of the National Heroes Kabila-Lumumba Ordre National «Héros-Nationaux, Kabila-Lumumba»

Awarded by Democratic Republic of the Congo
- Type: State order
- Established: 5 August 2002; 24 years ago
- Country: Democratic Republic of the Congo
- Motto: French: "Justice, Paix, Travail" ("Justice, Peace, Work")
- Eligibility: Congolese nationals and foreigners
- Criteria: Merits and loyal services to the nation
- Status: Active
- Grand Chancellor: Félix Tshisekedi
- Chancellor: André Matutezulwa
- Classes: Grand Cordon; Grand Officer; Commander; Officer; Knight

Precedence
- Next (higher): None
- Ribbon

Order of the National Heroes Kabila-Lumumba (French: Ordre National «Héros-Nationaux, Kabila-Lumumba») is the highest order of the Democratic Republic of the Congo (DRC). It is awarded to Congolese nationals and foreigners who have rendered merits and loyal services to the nation. The order was instituted in 2002 as a replacement for the National Order of the Leopard. It is named after President Laurent-Désiré Kabila and Prime Minister Patrice Lumumba, both of whom were assassinated while in office.

== History ==
During the independence of the DRC, there have been four "national orders": Order of the Congolese Nation (Ordre de la Nation Congolaise), National Order of the Leopard (Ordre National du Léopard), National Order of Zaire (Ordre National du Zaïre), and the Order of the National Heroes Kabila-Lumumba, the last of which was founded by Law No. 009/2002 (5 August 2002) and amended by Decree-Law No. 012/2003 (30 March 2003). The previous national orders are no longer awarded. The order is named after President Laurent-Désiré Kabila and Prime Minister Patrice Lumumba. Both were assassinated while in office, on 17 January 1961 and 16 January 2001, respectively. Lumumba had already been declared a "national hero" in 1966 during the rule of Mobutu Sese Seko, and Kabila followed quickly after his death when his son Joseph Kabila immediately took office as the new president. In the form of the new order, both are jointly commemorated as martyrs for national liberation against foreign influence. It is the highest order of the country, given for merits and loyal services to the nation.

An initial set of insignia was drawn up shortly after the order had been instituted. The insignia, however, had to be re-drawn after the DRC changed its flag and emblem in 2006. The insignia are manufactured by Eng Leong Medallic Industries.

It is managed by the Chancery of National Orders (Chancellerie des Ordres Nationaux), located in Gombe, Kinshasa. Its Grand Chancellor is the President of the DRC, currently Félix Tshisekedi, who is aided by the Chancellor, currently André Matutezulwa.

The Congolese orders, decorations, and medals have been marred by corruption. André Matutezulwa has publicly denied that he has ever decorated a Chinese national to the Order of the National Heroes Kabila-Lumumba. Controversy ensued when John Numbi, then Inspector General of the Congolese National Police implicated in the murder of human rights activist Floribert Chebeya and his chauffeur, was made Grand Officer of the order (17 May 2017)

The order can be awarded to both Congolese nationals and foreigners. It has separate civilian and military divisions. It can also be conferred posthumously. Membership can be revoked for treason or for other serious crimes.

== Classes ==
It has the following five classes:

- Grand Cordon (Grand Cordon)
- Grand Officer (Grand Officier)
- Commander (Commandeur)
- Officer (Officier)
- Knight (Chevalier)

== Recipients of the Grand Cordon ==
- Mohammed VI of Morocco (28 February 2006)
- (Democratic Republic of the Congo) Samba Kaputo (4 August 2007, posthumously)
- (Democratic Republic of the Congo) Antoine Gizenga (24 January 2009)
- (Democratic Republic of the Congo) Joseph Kabila (1 July 2010)
- (Belgian Congo) Simon Kimbangu (1 July 2010, posthumously)
- (Zaire) Joseph Malula (1 July 2010, posthumously)
- (Democratic Republic of the Congo) Marcel Bisukiro (1 July 2010)
- (Democratic Republic of the Congo) Justin Bomboko (1 July 2010)
- (Democratic Republic of the Congo) Christophe Gbenye (1 July 2010)
- (Democratic Republic of the Congo) Augustin Katumba Mwanke (12 February 2012, posthumously)
- (Senegal) Abdou Diouf (14 April 2014)
- (Democratic Republic of the Congo) Abdoulaye Yerodia Ndombasi (26 February 2019, posthumously)
- (Democratic Republic of the Congo) Étienne Tshisekedi (31 May 2019, posthumously)
- (Democratic Republic of the Congo) Léon Kengo wa Dondo (9 July 2020)
- (Democratic Republic of the Congo) Joseph Kasa-Vubu (3 October 2020, posthumously)
- (Democratic Republic of the Congo) Timothée Munkutu (21 January 2021, posthumously)
- (Democratic Republic of the Congo) Laurent Monsengwo Pasinya (20 July 2021, posthumously)
- (Democratic Republic of the Congo) Tharcisse Tshibangu Tshishiku (11 January 2022, posthumously)
- (Democratic Republic of the Congo) Benoît Lwamba (19 February 2022, posthumously)
- (Belgium) George Arthur Forrest (7 September 2022)
- (Guinea-Bissau) Umaro Sissoco Embaló (29 April 2025)

== See also ==
- Orders, decorations, and medals of the Democratic Republic of the Congo
