= College of Commissioners-General =

Government of the DRC from 1960 to 1961

College of Commissioners-General Collège des Commissaires-generaux
- Government of the Republic of the Congo (now the Democratic Republic of the Congo)

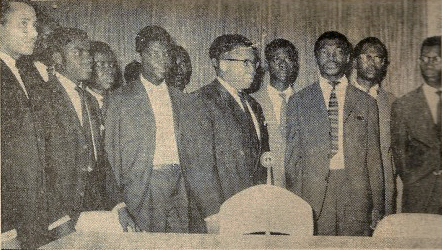
- President Joseph Kasa-Vubu (center) with the College of Commissioners-General
- Date formed: 20 September 1960
- Date dissolved: 9 February 1961

People and organisations
- Head of state: Joseph Kasa-Vubu
- Head of government: Albert Ndele (to 3 October 1960); Justin Marie Bomboko (from 3 October 1960)
- Deputy head of government: Albert Ndele

History
- Predecessor: 1st Iléo Government (Note: The Iléo Government and Lumumba Government competed with each other for recognition and control of the national institutions before the College was installed.)
- Successor: 2nd Iléo Government

The College of Commissioners-General (French: Collège des Commissaires-generaux) was a body of university graduates that acted as the third government of the Democratic Republic of the Congo (then Republic of the Congo) under the leadership of Albert Ndele from 20 September 1960 to 3 October 1960 and Justin Marie Bomboko from 3 October 1960 until 9 February 1961.

== Background ==
On 24 June 1960 the Lumumba Government was installed as the first indigenous government of the new Republic of the Congo. Independence followed on 30 June 1960, but governing became chaotic amid an army mutiny, disorder, and Belgian intervention.

Throughout August 1960 President Joseph Kasa-Vubu became increasingly bothered by Prime Minister Patrice Lumumba's growing authoritarianism, the collapse in administration, and the enlarging prospects of civil war. On 5 September Kasa-Vubu announced the revocation of Lumumba's ministerial mandate, along with the dismissal of Deputy Prime Minister Antoine Gizenga, three other ministers, and two secretaries of state over the radio. He stated that the President of the Senate, Joseph Iléo, would form a new government. After Lumumba heard of the firing he held heated discussions with his ministers and made three broadcasts, defending his government and declaring Kasa-Vubu to be deposed.

Two days later the Chamber of Deputies convened to discuss Kasa-Vubu's dismissal order. The Chamber voted to annul both Kasa-Vubu's and Lumumba's declarations of dismissal, 60 to 19. The following day the Senate delivered the Lumumba Government a vote of confidence, 49 to zero with seven abstentions. According to Article 51, Parliament was granted the "exclusive privilege" to interpret the constitution. In cases of doubt and controversy, the Congolese were originally supposed to appeal constitutional questions to the Belgian Conseil d'État. With the rupture of relations in July this was no longer possible, so no authoritative interpretation or mediation was available to bring a legal resolution to the dispute.

== Mobutu's coup ==
On 14 September Colonel Joseph-Desiré Mobutu announced over the radio that he was launching a 'peaceful revolution' to break the political impasse and therefore neutralising the President, Lumumba's and Iléo's respective governments, and Parliament until 31 December. He stated that "technicians" would run the administration while the politicians sorted out their differences. In a subsequent press conference he clarified that Congolese university graduates would be asked to form a government and further declared that all Eastern Bloc countries should close their embassies. Lumumba and Kasa-Vubu were both surprised by the coup. (Note: Various sources state Mobutu's action was encouraged and supported by Belgium and the United States.)

== Organisation and establishment ==
On 20 September Mobutu announced the formation of the College of Commissioners-General under the chairmanship of Justin Marie Bomboko. Soldiers expelled the remaining politicians from their offices. Of the Commissioners-General, Albert Ndele, Joseph Mbeka, and Martin Ngwete had all been chef de cabinet to a minister in the Lumumba Government. Damien Kandolo, chef de cabinet to Lumumba, was also made a commissioner. Both Thomas Kanza and Andrè Mandi, members of Lumumba's government, were invited to join the College. Though the latter attended the College's early sessions, both became disturbed by the body's inclination towards Kasa-Vubu and summarily refused to participate in the administration. (Note: Kanza said he and Mandi refused to join the "illegal government" because they did not want to "abandon the constitution". According to Mabika Kalanda, Kanza had expressed interest in joining to Bomboko and returned to Léopoldville only to be surprised with news that he was not included in the College's final composition.) Their abstention allowed the government's anti-Lumumba slant to worsen without restraint. Meanwhile, Lumumba's Minister of Youth and Sports, Maurice Mpolo attempted to undermine the College and rivaled Mobutu for control of the army.

== Composition ==
The full list of commissioners was printed in the Moniteur Congolais on 10 October. The following all served during the College's existence:

=== Commissioners-general ===
1. Commissioner-General for Foreign Affairs and External Commerce and President of the College Justin Bomboko (Free University of Brussels)
2. Commissioner-General for Finance and Monetary Questions and Vice-President of the College Albert Ndele (Catholic University of Leuven)
3. Commissioner-General for Labour and Social Problems Charles Bokonga (Catholic University of Leuven)
4. Commissioner-General for National Education and Youth and Sports and Spokesman of the College Mario-Philippe Cardoso (Catholic University of Leuven)
5. Commissioner-General for Public Function Valentin Bindo Albi (Free University of Brussels)
6. Commissioner-General for National Defence Ferdinand Kazadi (Lovanium University)
7. Commissioner-General for Agriculture and the Middle Class Pierre Lebughe (Lovanium University)
8. Commissioner-General for Justice Marcel Lihau (Catholic University of Leuven)
9. Commissioner-General for Public Works Joseph Masanga (Lovanium University)
10. Commissioner-General for Economic Co-ordination and Planning Joseph Mbeka (Lovanium University)
11. Commissioner-General for Information and Spokesman of the College Albert Bolela (Catholic University of Leuven)
12. Commissioner-General for Social Affairs Albert Mpase (Catholic University of Leuven)
13. Commissioner-General for Telecommunications Aubert Mukendi (University of Liège)
14. Commissioner-General for Interior José Nussbaumer (Catholic University of Leuven)
15. Commissioner-General for Public Health Marcel Tshibamba (Lovanium University)

=== Commissioners ===
1. Commissioner for Social Affairs Albert Atunda
2. Commissioner for National Education and Youth and Sports Cléophas Bizala
3. Commissioner for National Education Honoré Waku
4. Commissioner for Labour and Social Problems André Bo-Boliko
5. Commissioner for Interior Damien Kondolo
6. Commissioner for Interior Jonas Mukamba
7. Commissioner for Foreign Affairs and External Commerce Ernest Kashemwa
8. Commissioner for Foreign Affairs and External Commerce Evariste Loliki
9. Commissioner for Economic Co-ordination and Planning Julien Kasongo
10. Commissioner for Information Pascal Kapella
11. Commissioner for Information Zépherin Konde
12. Commissioner for Public Function François Kungula
13. Commissioner for Public Function Félicien Lukusa
14. Commissioner for Finance Paul Mushiete
15. Commissioner for Agriculture Claude Ngondo
16. Commissioner for the Middle Class Jean-Marie Ngyesse François
17. Commissioner for Transport and Communications Gilbert Pongo
18. Commissioner for Justice Etienne Tshisekedi
19. Commissioner for National Defence Nestor Watum
20. Commissioner for Public Works Henri Takizala
21. Commissioner for Public Works Joseph Posho
22. Commissioner for Public Health Martin Ngwete

== Tenure ==
On 11 October Kasa-Vubu issued a "constitutional decree-law" officiating the establishment of the College of Commissioners-General, asserting his right as Head of State to appoint and dismiss its members, adjourning Parliament indefinitely, and conferring all legislative authority prescribed to Parliament by the Loi Fondementale to the College. (Note: Mabika Kalanda, a temporary member of the College, in addition to retrospectively declaring the Mobutu coup and his government to be unconstitutional, challenged Kasa-Vubu's order as overstepping the authority of the Presidency, noting that part of the Loi Fondementale read, "the Head of State has no powers other than those formally conferred upon him by this fundamental law".) In time, the College would come to bring about the restoration of some order to the administration that had been lost during the Lumumba Government's tenure. Lumumba frequently attacked the body's credibility. As the end of the year approached Mobutu backed away from his promise of restoring democratic processes after December and postponed the return to normal governance indefinitely.

In an attempt to indicate a reorientation towards legality, the College of Commissioners was dissolved by Kasa-Vubu on 9 February 1961 and replaced by a new cabinet under Iléo.

== Aftermath ==
Bomboko returned to his post as Minister of Foreign Affairs.
