= National Order of the Leopard =

Highest national order of DR Congo

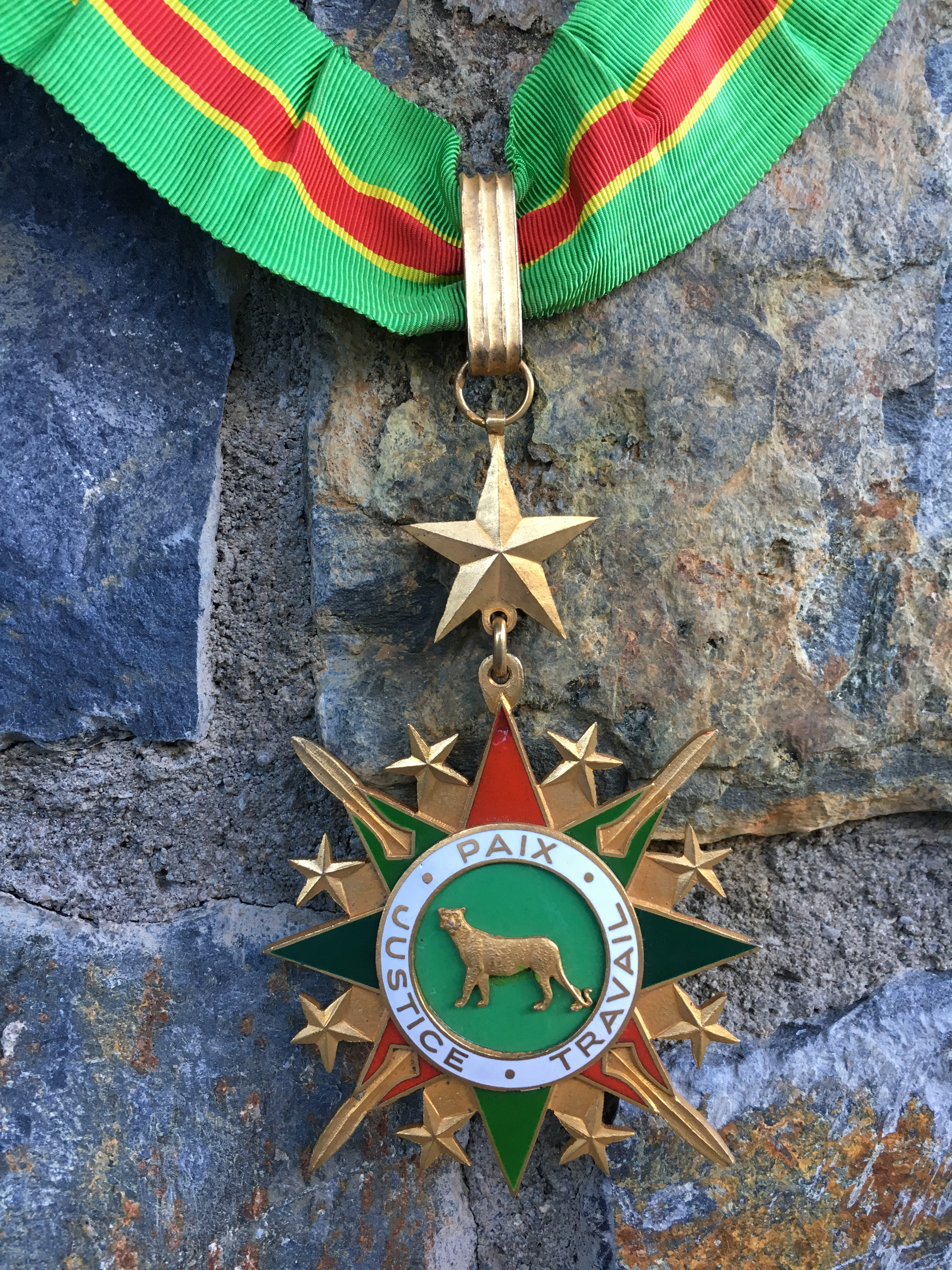
- Commander cross of the Order, second type (Republic of Zaire)

Awarded by Democratic Republic of the Congo
- Type: Order
- Status: Active
- Sovereign: President
- Grades: Grand Cordon; Grand Officer; Commander; Officer; Knight

Precedence
- Next (higher): None
- Ribbon bar of the order (DR Congo) Ribbon bar of the order (Zaire) Ribbon bar of the order (DR Congo; since 2025)

The National Order of the Leopard (French: Ordre national du Léopard) is the highest national order of the Democratic Republic of the Congo. It was first instituted on 24 May 1966 by President Mobutu Sese Seko through Ordinance-Law No. 66-329 as the country's premier award in recognition of outstanding military and civilian service to the state. The order remained active until 1997, when the Mobutu regime was overthrown by the Alliance of Democratic Forces for the Liberation of Congo, after which it was no longer awarded. In 2002, it was replaced by the Order of the National Heroes Kabila-Lumumba.

The order was revived following the adoption of Law No. 25/058 by the Congolese Parliament on 23 December 2025. The legislation was signed into law by President Félix Tshisekedi and proclaimed through a presidential ordinance on 31 December 2025. The order is awarded in recognition of prominent service to the nation and may be granted to Congolese citizens as well as, in exceptional circumstances, foreign recipients.

The President of the Republic serves as Grand Chancellor of the Order, while its administration is overseen by the Chancellery of National Orders.

== Ranks ==
The National Order of the Leopard was composed of five grades:

- Grand Cordon
- Grand Officer
- Commander
- Officer
- Knight

== Notable recipients ==
Grand Cordons

- Emperor Akihito
- Maria Barroso
- Jean-Bédel Bokassa
- Mohammad Reza Pahlavi
- Elizabeth II (1973)
- Prince Philip, Duke of Edinburgh (1973)
- Juan Carlos I of Spain
- Isaac Kalonji
- Jules Fontaine Sambwa
- Haile Selassie
- Queen Sofía of Spain
- Kim Il Sung (1992)
- Kim Jong Il (1992)

Grand Officers

- Georges Forrest
- Paul Muhona

Commanders

- Albert-Joseph Kasongo Wa Kapinga
- Fernand Kazadi Lupelekese
- Hugh Wontner
- Pauline Maata Nkumu
- Yosia Bulo Butso

Officers

- Peter Piot
- Robin Gillett
- Franco Luambo

Knights

- Jean Ruhigita Ndagora Bugwika
- Raymond Dekkers
- Médard Autsai Asenga
- Jean Bolikango
- Jean-Pierre Hallet
- Hosni Mubarak
- Ndaye Mulamba
- Fally Ipupa
- Yoane Wissa
- Chanel Mbemba
