= Wivine Mumba =

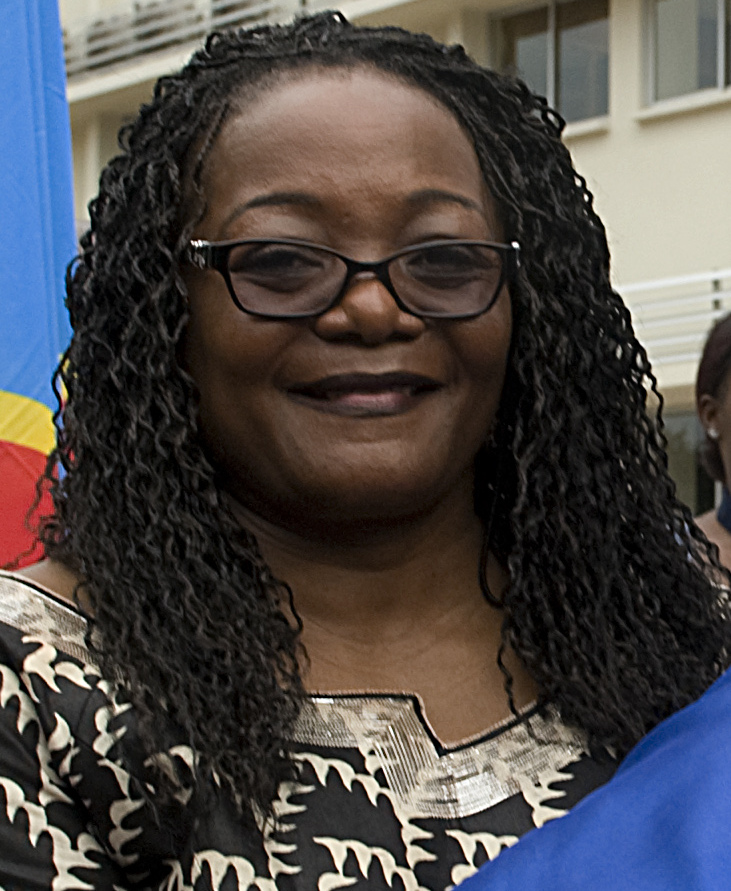
Wivine Mumba Matipa in 2014.

Wivine Mumba Matipa is a DRC politician. From 2012 to 2015 she was Minister of Justice in the government of Joseph Kabila. In May 2017 she was announced as Minister of the Portfolio in Kabila's inclusive interim government.
