= Albert Ndele =

Congolese politician (1930–2023)

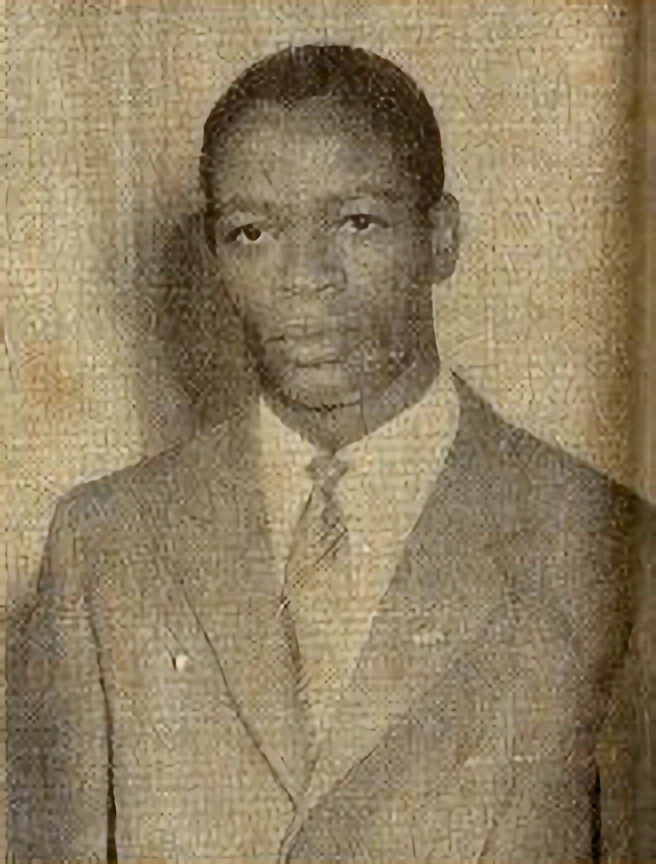
- Ndele in 1960

Chairman of the Board of Commissioners-General of Congo-Léopoldville
- In office 20 September 1960 – 3 October 1960
- President: Joseph Kasa-Vubu
- Preceded by: Joseph Iléo (as Prime Minister)
- Succeeded by: Justin Marie Bomboko

Deputy Chairman of the Board of Commissioners-General of Congo-Léopoldville
- In office 3 October 1960 – 9 February 1961
- President: Joseph Kasa-Vubu

Minister of Finance of the Democratic Republic of the Congo
- In office 15 September 1970 – 12 November 1970
- President: Joseph-Désiré Mobutu
- Preceded by: Louis Namwezi
- Succeeded by: Louis Namwezi

Personal details
- Born: 15 August 1930 Boma, Belgian Congo
- Died: 1 April 2023 (aged 92) Brussels, Belgium
- Party: Independent
- Education: Université catholique de Louvain

Albert Ndele Bamu (15 August 1930 – 1 April 2023) was a Congolese politician and banker. He served as chairman of the College of Commissioners-General that governed the Republic of the Congo (Léopoldville) for two weeks while Justin Marie Bomboko returned from New York to Léopoldville, and the next four months as deputy chairman. He was later governor of the National Bank of the Congo from 1961 to 1970. He briefly served as the Minister of Finance. One term from September 1960 to February 1961, and another term from 15 September 1970 until his dismissal on 12 November 1970.

Ndele died in Brussels, Belgium on 1 April 2023, at the age of 92.
