= National Commission for the Censorship of Songs and Performances =

Congolese regulatory authority

- Commission nationale de censure des chansons et des spectacles

Agency overview
- Formed: 23 August 1967; 58 years ago and was later renamed and restructured 21 February 1996; 30 years ago
- Type: Government agency
- Jurisdiction: Government of the Democratic Republic of the Congo
- Headquarters: Kinshasa, Democratic Republic of the Congo
- Minister responsible: Ministry of Justice and Keeper of the Seals

The National Commission for the Censorship of Songs and Performances (French: Commission nationale de censure des chansons et des spectacles; CNCCS) is a governmental agency under the Ministry of Justice and Keeper of the Seals in the Democratic Republic of the Congo. Headquartered in Kinshasa, its primary function is to regulate public entertainment, ensuring that music, performances, and audiovisual materials align with the country's public order and moral standards.

Originally established as the Commission de Censure de la Musique by Ministerial Decree No. 225 on 23 August 1967, the commission was restructured and renamed by Law No. 0003 on 21 February 1996, becoming the CNCCS. The law mandates that no song or public performance, whether new or modified, can be offered to the public or distributed without prior written authorization from the CNCCS or its local branches. In addition to monitoring music and live performances, the CNCCS is responsible for overseeing audiovisual content. The commission regulates content distribution, including the prohibition of materials such as pornography and any content considered harmful to minors. It enforces its regulations through penalties.

== Functions and responsibilities ==
The CNCCS is entrusted with maintaining public order and moral standards by reviewing the content of music, performances, and audiovisual materials, ensuring they do not promote harmful or offensive messages.

Function and responsibility	Description	Ref.
Music review and approval	CNCCS reviews and approves all musical content before it is publicly performed or distributed. This includes both live performances and recorded music. The commission ensures that songs do not contain content deemed harmful to public order or morals, such as racial or tribal hatred, defamatory language, or insults. No music (whether performed by live orchestras or distributed via records, tapes, or digital formats) can be broadcast without prior approval from the CNCCS.	
Censorship of music recordings	Before the production and release of music recordings, individuals or entities involved in the creation of musical content are required to submit their material, including lyrics, to the CNCCS for evaluation. If a song is found to be inconsistent with national moral standards or potentially inciteful, the commission has the authority to withhold approval and prevented the song from being produced or publicly disseminated.	
Enforcement of censorship decisions	Once the CNCCS has made a decision regarding a song or performance, its ruling is enforceable by law. The Ministry of Justice and Keeper of the Seals validates these decisions, and judicial authorities—including public prosecutors and police officers—are tasked with ensuring compliance. In practice, this includes the confiscation and destruction of prohibited music materials.	
Public access to censorship records	To ensure transparency and accountability, the CNCCS maintains a public register of all songs and performances that have been either approved or banned. This register is accessible at the Kinshasa District Court (Tribunal de grande instance de Kinshasa), where members of the public can consult the status of any song or performance. Any content that has not been submitted for review before its release may also be subject to censure, should it later be deemed to violate public morals or incite hate.	
Regulation of performances and audiovisual media	The CNCCS's role extends beyond music to include films and other public performances. According to Law No. 0003 of 21 February 1996, any public performance, whether a song or film, must be approved by the CNCCS before it can be presented to an audience or broadcast. This includes the regulation of pornographic films, which can only be shown to the public if they have received explicit authorization from the commission. The oversight of such content is particularly important given its potential to negatively impact the development and education of minors, a responsibility that the CNCCS takes seriously.	
Legal penalties for non-compliance	The CNCCS has the authority to impose legal penalties on individuals or entities that fail to adhere to its censorship rules. According to the Congolese Penal Code, penalties can be levied against those who distribute songs, films, or performances without prior approval from the commission or violate other provisions outlined in the commission's regulations. The law also allows the commission to prohibit the further dissemination of recordings that were released prior to its establishment if they are later found to contravene the prescribed standards of decency and public order.	
Authority over new and modified songs	Under Law No. 0003, no new or modified songs—whether original compositions or re-recorded versions—may be released to the public without prior written authorization from the CNCCS or its local branches. This requirement applies to all forms of public media distribution, including digital platforms, which are increasingly relevant in the age of the internet and satellite television.	

== Criticism ==
The CNCCS has faced significant criticism for several aspects of its operations, particularly regarding its handling of sensitive content and its impact on freedom of expression. One area of criticism concerns the regulation of pornographic films, with critics arguing that their distribution, particularly to young audiences, poses a threat to public order as minors may attempt to emulate the behaviors depicted in these films. There have been reported cases where minors involved in criminal activities, including sexual assault, cited pornography as an influence on their actions. Detractors argue that the CNCCS has failed to effectively oversee the marketing and screening of such films. The legal framework underpinning the CNCCS is viewed as outdated and insufficient to address the realities of contemporary media consumption. The 1996 legal texts that established the CNCCS do not account for the rise of online media or satellite and cable television broadcasts from outside the DRC. As such, there is concern that the commission's regulatory powers are ill-equipped to handle the growing influence of digital platforms and foreign content, which are widely accessible within the country. Many advocates call for the commission to modernize its laws to better address these new challenges and protect viewers, particularly minors, from potentially harmful content.

The restriction of artistic freedom is another significant point of contention, with critics, including organizations like Amnesty International, condemning the CNCCS's use of censorship to suppress artistic expression. The banning of songs, particularly those critical of the government, has led to accusations that the CNCCS is stifling dissent and freedom of expression, with Amnesty International stressing that the commission often targets songs that criticize government failures, human rights violations, and political corruption. Such actions are viewed as violations of both the International Covenant on Civil and Political Rights (ICCPR) and the African Charter on Human and Peoples' Rights, which guarantee the right to freedom of expression. The 1996 decree that governs the CNCCS has been also criticized for its vague and undefined criteria, offering no clear recourse for those affected by its decisions. The decree requires artists to pay a fee of up to $500 per song for review by the CNCCS, a significant financial burden, particularly for local musicians. Critics argue that this financial obstacle, combined with the lack of a transparent or well-defined framework, undermines the ability of artists to freely express themselves. The decree's broad stipulations, prohibiting content that allegedly violates public morality without a clear definition of what constitutes such violations, are often seen as a tool for political repression that enable the authorities to silence critical voices under the guise of protecting public order.
