= Constitutional Court of the Democratic Republic of the Congo =

Constitutional Court
- Cour Constitutionnelle
- Interactive map of Constitutional Court
- 4°18′41″S 15°16′51″E
- Established: 18 February 2006 (Constitution); 4 April 2015 (effective)
- Jurisdiction: Democratic Republic of the Congo
- Location: Constitutional Court Building, Gombe, Kinshasa
- Coordinates: 4°18′41″S 15°16′51″E
- Authorised by: Constitution of the Third Republic
- Website: cour-constitutionnelle.cd

President
- Currently: Dieudonné Kamuleta Badibanga
- Since: 21 June 2022

The Constitutional Court (French: Cour Constitutionnelle) was established by the Constitution of the Third Republic on 18 February 2006 as the highest constitutional authority in the Democratic Republic of the Congo. However, it did not start functioning until 2015. Its role is to ensure the constitutionality of laws and statutes created by government officials and organizations. The Court is headquartered in the Constitutional Court Building at Place Royale in Gombe, Kinshasa.

== Composition ==
The Court consists of nine members appointed by the President of the Republic, including three appointed by his own initiative, three chosen by the Parliament, and three designated by the High Council of the Judiciary. Two-thirds of the members must by lawyers from the ranks of judges or prosecutors, from the Bar, or from university education. The other basic requirements are being Congolese and having 15 years of experience in legal work.

The non-renewable term for members is nine years. A third of the membership is renewed every three years, with members of the group chosen by drawing lots. The President of the Constitutional Court is elected by the other members for a three-year term, renewable once. He is invested by ordinance of the President of the Republic.

== Powers ==
The Constitutional Court is the most powerful judicial institution within the Congolese legal system and wields broader authority than any other court. The constitution dedicates thirteen articles to it (Articles 157–169), while far fewer provisions govern judicial and administrative courts. Its decisions are final, immediately enforceable, and not subject to appeal. They are binding on all public authorities, administrative and judicial bodies, both civil and military, as well as on private individuals. The Court is competent to hear:

- constitutional review;
- interpretation of the constitution;
- exceptions of unconstitutionality;
- electoral disputes;
- conflicts of competence;
- appeals against decisions of the Court of Cassation and the Council of State;
- criminal offenses committed by the president of the republic and the prime minister.

=== Constitutional review and interpretation of the constitution ===
The Constitutional Court ensures the constitutionality of laws, acts having the force of law, treaties, and international agreements. Before promulgation or implementation, it must verify the conformity of organic laws and the internal regulations of parliamentary chambers and Congress, the Independent National Electoral Commission (CENI), and the Higher Council for Audiovisual and Communication with the constitution. Laws may be referred to the court by the president of the republic, the prime minister, the presidents of the National Assembly or Senate, or by one-tenth of the deputies or senators. If a treaty or international agreement is found to contain provisions contrary to the constitution, it may be ratified only after a constitutional amendment.

The Court rules on requests for constitutional interpretation submitted by the president of the republic, the government, the presidents of the National Assembly or Senate, one-tenth of the members of either chamber, provincial governors, and presidents of provincial assemblies.

=== Exceptions of unconstitutionality, electoral disputes, and conflicts of competence ===
The Constitutional Court hears exceptions of unconstitutionality raised before or by any court. Any person may challenge the constitutionality of a legislative or regulatory act. When such an exception is raised during proceedings, the matter is referred to the Constitutional Court. A declaration of unconstitutionality prevents the application of the contested act in the specific case, without repealing the act itself. This differs from constitutional review, which results in annulment.

The Court adjudicates disputes related to presidential and legislative elections, as well as referendums.

The Constitutional Court resolves conflicts of authority between the executive and legislative branches, and between the central government and provincial entities.

=== Appeals and offenses ===
The Court hears appeals against decisions of the Court of Cassation and the Council of State only when those courts rule on the allocation of jurisdiction between the judicial and administrative orders, provided that an objection to jurisdiction was raised beforehand.

The Constitutional Court acts as the criminal court for the president of the republic and the prime minister, including accomplices, for political offenses such as high treason, contempt of parliament, attacks on honor or integrity, insider trading, and other crimes committed in connection with their official duties. High treason includes deliberate violations of the constitution, serious human rights abuses, or the transfer of national territory. Attacks on honor or integrity involve conduct contrary to public morality or acts of corruption, embezzlement, or illicit enrichment. Insider trading refers to transactions based on privileged, non-public information. Contempt of parliament arises when the prime minister fails to respond to a parliamentary question within 30 days.

A conviction results in removal from office. For offenses unrelated to official duties, proceedings are suspended until the end of the term of office, and limitation periods are also suspended.

=== Comparison with the former Supreme Court of Justice ===
The Constitutional Court inherits from the former Supreme Court powers over constitutional review, interpretation, unconstitutionality exceptions, and electoral disputes. However, it also exercises additional authority such as:

- criminal judge of the president and prime minister;
- arbiter of conflicts between branches of government and between the state and provinces;
- judge of jurisdictional disputes between judicial and administrative orders.

Given its exceptional authority, the Constitutional Court requires strict eligibility standards. Appointing authorities, especially the president of the republic, must act with prudence to prevent politicization and ensure the Court's independence and impartiality.

== See also ==
- Court of Cassation
