= Marcel Bisukiro =

Congolese journalist and politician (1929–2016)

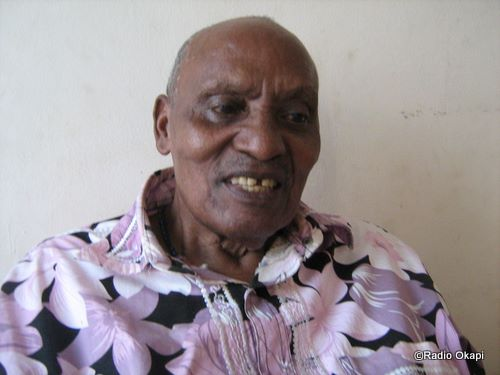
- Bisukiro in 2010

Minister of External Commerce of the Republic of the Congo
- In office 24 June 1960 – September 1960
- In office 2 August 1961 – 13 April 1962

Personal details
- Born: 27 September 1929 Kamayi, Rutshuru Territory, Belgian Congo
- Died: 7 June 2016 (aged 86)
- Resting place: Kahanga, Rutshuru Territory, Democratic Republic of the Congo
- Party: Centre du Regroupement Africain

Marcel Bisukiro Tabaro wa Kamonyi (27 September 1929 – 7 June 2016) was a Congolese journalist and politician. He was a leading member of the Centre du Regroupement Africain and served twice as Minister of External Commerce of the Democratic Republic of the Congo from June until September 1960 and from August 1961 until April 1962.

== Biography ==
Marcel Bisukiro was born on 27 September 1929 (Note: According to the Centre de recherche et d'information socio-politiques and Artigue, Bisukiro was born in November.) in Kamayi, Rutshuru Territory, Kivu Province, Belgian Congo to a Nyarwanda family. He attended middle school in Nyangezi. He later worked as a clerk for the Office dès produits agricoles du Kivu.

Bisukiro cofounded the Centre du Regroupement Africain (CEREA) party in Bukavu in 1958 and assisted in establishing several new chapters. He also acted as the commercial director of the party publication, Vérité. Bisukiro had connections with foreign leftists and took a programmatic approach to his politics. In August 1959 Bisukiro was elected secretary general of the party. That year he was also elected to the Kadutu communal council. He attended the Belgo-Congolese Political Round Table Conference of January–February 1960 as a deputy delegate for CEREA and participated in the subsequent Economic Round Table Conference.

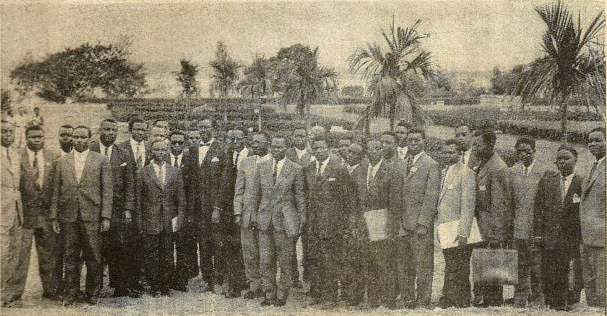
The Lumumba Government shortly after its investiture; Bisukiro stands fourth from the left.

In the general elections of 1960, Bisukiro was elected by the Provincial Assembly of Kivu to serve in the Senate on a non-customary, CEREA ticket. In June 1960 he was appointed by Patrice Lumumba to serve as Minister of External Commerce in his government. After Lumumba's dismissal, he continued to hold the office under Joseph Iléo, but later in the year he fled the capital to take up the same portfolio in Antoine Gizenga's rival government. On 19 March 1961 Bisukiro founded a journal, Dignité Nouvelle, in Bukavu. Negotiations between various factions resulted in the investiture of a new government on 2 August under Cyrille Adoula, and he returned to his post as Minister of External Commerce in the central government. On 13 April 1962 a motion of censure was tabled against him in the Chamber of Deputies. The petitioning deputies stated that his commercial activities in the private sector were constitutionally incompatible with his ministerial duties, accused him of scheming to sell Virunga National Park to foreigners, and suggested that he was of "non-Congolese" nationality. Though he was vociferously defended by Chamber First Vice-President Joseph Midiburo, following the debate the motion of censure was passed, 58 votes to six with seven abstentions, and Bisukiro was dismissed from his post. In November the Adoula Government decreed a state of military rule and arrested Bisukiro and three other parliamentarians on charges of plotting rebellion. On 23 November the Chamber forced the government to rescind its actions. After ending his service in Parliament he worked as a businessman. In 1964 a new constitution was ratified that marginalised Rwandan immigrants. Bisukiro criticised it as discriminatory. On 1 July 2010 he was awarded the Grand Cordon of the Order of the National Heroes Kabila-Lumumba by President Joseph Kabila.

Bisukiro died on 7 June 2016. His body was flown to Goma on 12 July, where it was received at the airport by the Provincial Governor of Kivu and the President of the Provincial Assembly and given honours by the police. After a funeral procession toured the city, the body was brought to the locality of Kahanga, Rutshuru Territory and was buried in a family cemetery. A wake was held for him at the Rugabo II stadium in Rutshuru.
