= 1964 Republic of the Congo (Léopoldville) constitutional referendum =

- 25 June–10 July 1964

Results
Choice	Votes	%
Yes	2,151,122	90.82%
No	217,329	9.18%
Valid votes	2,368,451	98.52%
Invalid or blank votes	35,688	1.48%
Total votes	2,404,139	100.00%

A constitutional referendum was held in the Republic of the Congo (Léopoldville) between 25 June and 10 July 1964. The new constitution, known as the "Luluabourg Constitution", changed the country's system of government, its name, and the number of provinces. It was approved by 91% of voters.

== Background ==
Following the Congo Crisis, negotiations between politicians resulted in the drafting of a new constitution. The new document created a presidential system of government in place of the previous semi-presidential system, where both the Prime Minister and President had certain powers. It also made the country more federalist, and increased the number of provinces from six to 21.

The country was renamed the "Democratic Republic of Congo" (having been officially the "Republic of Congo" since independence in 1960, a name shared by its neighbour)

== Results ==
Choice	Votes	%
For	2,151,122	90.82
Against	217,329	9.18
Invalid/blank votes	35,688	–
Total	2,404,139	100
Source: African Elections Database

== Aftermath ==
When the constitution came into effect, the parliament elected in 1960 was automatically dissolved, and the President, Joseph Kasa-Vubu, appointed a transitional government, whose role was to organise elections within nine months.

In June 1964 Kasavubu appointed Moise Tshombe, who had led the Katanga breakaway, as the interim Prime Minister. After Tshombe's government announced that elections would be held by 30 March 1965, some politicians claimed they could not be held until peace talks with the remaining rebel factions had been held. However, the elections went ahead as planned between 18 March and 30 April.
