= Benoît Lwamba =

Congolese magistrate (1945–2022)

President of the Constitutional Court of the Democratic Republic of the Congo
- In office 11 April 2015 – 27 June 2020

First President of the Supreme Court of the Democratic Republic of the Congo
- In office 12 June 2003 – 23 November 2008

Personal details
- Born: Benoît Lwamba Bindu; 19 July 1945 Katanga Province, Belgian Congo
- Died: 17 January 2022 (aged 76) Brussels, Belgium

Benoît Lwamba (19 July 1945 – 17 January 2022) was a Congolese magistrate.

== Biography ==
He was First President of the Supreme Court of the Democratic Republic of the Congo from 2003 to 2008 and subsequently President of the Constitutional Court from 2015 to 2020. Since 2019, he had been subject to sanctions from the United States for his alleged involvement in corruption in the 2018 presidential election. Lwamba died in Brussels on 17 January 2022, at the age of 76.
