= Orders, decorations, and medals of the Democratic Republic of the Congo =

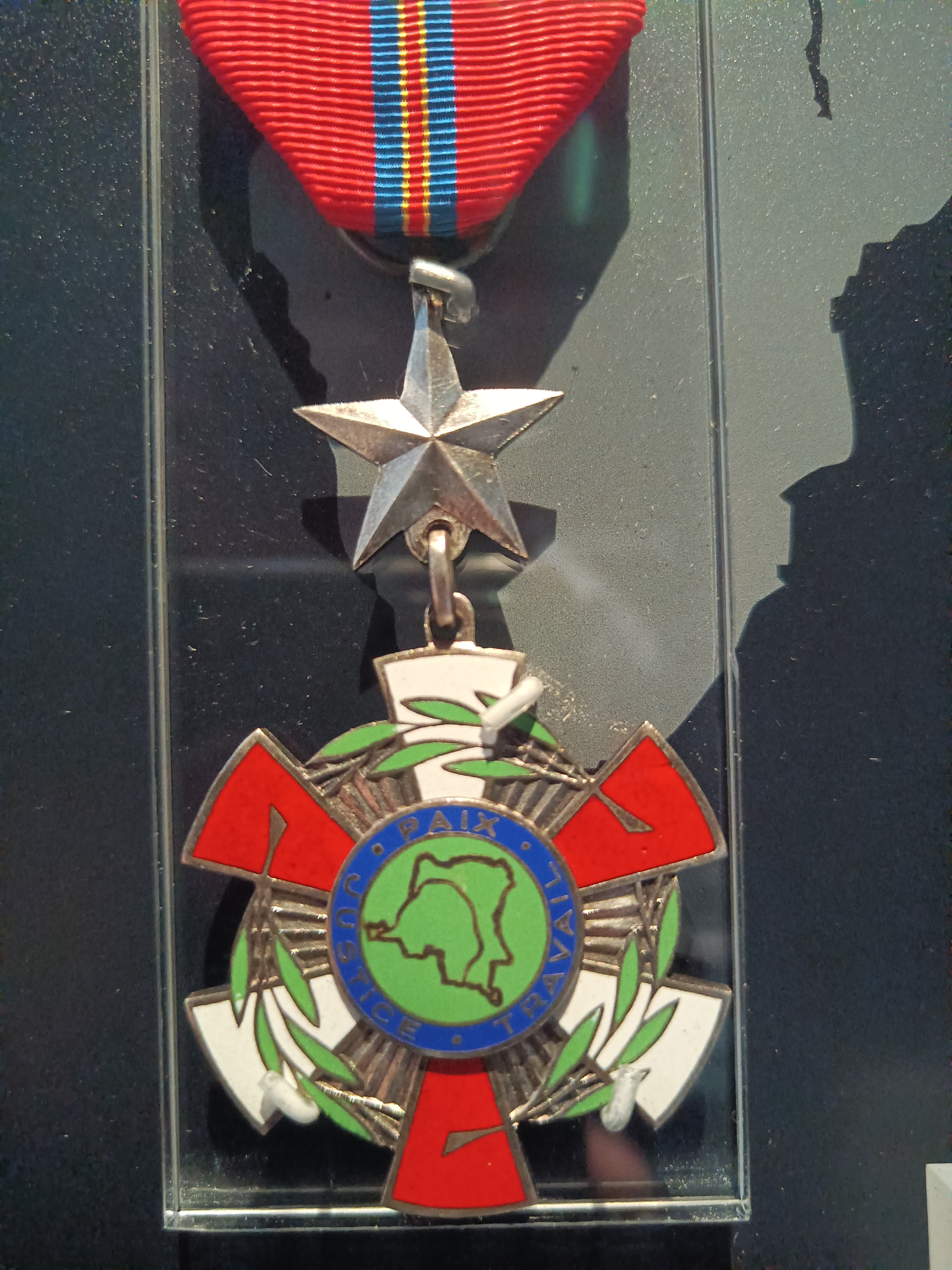
National Order of Zaire awarded to the astronaut Neil Armstrong

Orders, decorations, and medals of the Democratic Republic of the Congo include:

- Order of the National Heroes Kabila-Lumumba (Ordre National «Héros-Nationaux, Kabila-Lumumba»; five classes)
- Medal of Civil Merit (Médaille du mérite civique; in gold, silver, or bronze)
- Medal of Arts, Science and Letters Merit (Médaille du mérite des Arts, Sciences et Lettres; in gold, silver, or bronze)
- Medal of Sport Merit (Médaille du mérite sportif)
- Medal of Agricultural Merit (Médaille du mérite agricole)
- Medal of Maternal Merit (Médaille du mérite conjugale)
- Medal of Conjugal Merit (Médaille du mérite maternel)
- Medal of Peace (Médaille de la paix)
- Soldier of Liberation Medal (Médaille du Combattant de la libération)
- Soldier of Liberation Medal (17th of May) (Médaille du Combattant de la libération (du 17 mai))
- Cross of Military Bravery (Croix de la bravoure militaire; with star or palm)
- Military Cross (Croix militaire; two classes)
- Military Decoration (Décoration militaire; two classes)
- Police Bravery Cross (Croix de la bravoure policière; with star, palm, or clasp)
- Police Cross (Croix policière; three classes)
- Police Decoration (Décoration policière; two classes)
