= Nicolas Bayona Ba Meya =

First President of the Supreme Court of Justice of Zaire
- In office 1975–1983
- President: Mobutu Sese Seko
- Preceded by: Marcel Lihau
- Succeeded by: Kalala Ilunga

Justice of the Supreme Court of Justice of Zaire
- In office 14 August 1968 – 1975

Judge of the Court of Appeal of Lubumbashi
- In office 23 July 1966 – 14 August 1968

Personal details
- Born: Nicolas Bayonne; 25 November 1938 Voka, Bas-Congo, Belgian Congo
- Died: 26 August 1998 (aged 59)
- Education: Lovanium University

Nicolas Abel Bayona Ba Meya or Bayona Ba Meya Muna Kimvimba (25 November 1938 – 26 August 1998) was a Congolese jurist who served as First President of the Supreme Court of Justice of Zaire from 1975 until 1983.

== Biography ==
Nicolas Bayona Ba Meya was born as Nicolas Bayonne on 25 November 1938 in Voka, Bas-Congo, Belgian Congo. He studied humanities at a minor seminary in Kibula at the College Notre-Dame de Mbanza-Mboma from 1952 until 1960. He earned a law degree from Lovanium University four years later. On 23 July 1966 Bayona was appointed to serve as a judge for the Court of Appeal of Lubumbashi. On 14 August 1968 he was removed from his post and appointed to the Supreme Court of Justice. In 1969 he earned his doctorate in law from Lovanium. Afterwards he became a professor and in 1971 became the dean of faculty of law at the Kinshasa campus of the National University of Zaire (formerly Lovanium).

In 1975, when the International Court of Justice was considering a case concerning the transfer of power in Western Sahara, Bayona submitted his opinion to the court on the legal principle of terra nullius, which entails that a state may assume sovereignty over any unclaimed territory. He criticised terra nullius as materialistic and a contributory factor to the partition of Africa among European empires. He instead posited that a spiritual, ancestral connection between a plot of land and the people born of it offered a stronger basis for claims to sovereignty.

Bayona served as the First President of the Supreme Court of Justice from 1975 until 1983. In March 1996 he was made President of the Commission Nationale des Élections, a body designed to ensure the establishment of a free election by 1997 in Zaire as part of a democratic transition under President Mobutu Sese Seko. Opposition groups regarded Bayona as a puppet of Mobutu and doubted his ability to fairly oversee the process. The commission was disbanded in May 1997 after Laurent-Désiré Kabila seized power. He died on 26 August 1998.
