= Sophie Kanza =

Congolese politician (1940–1999)

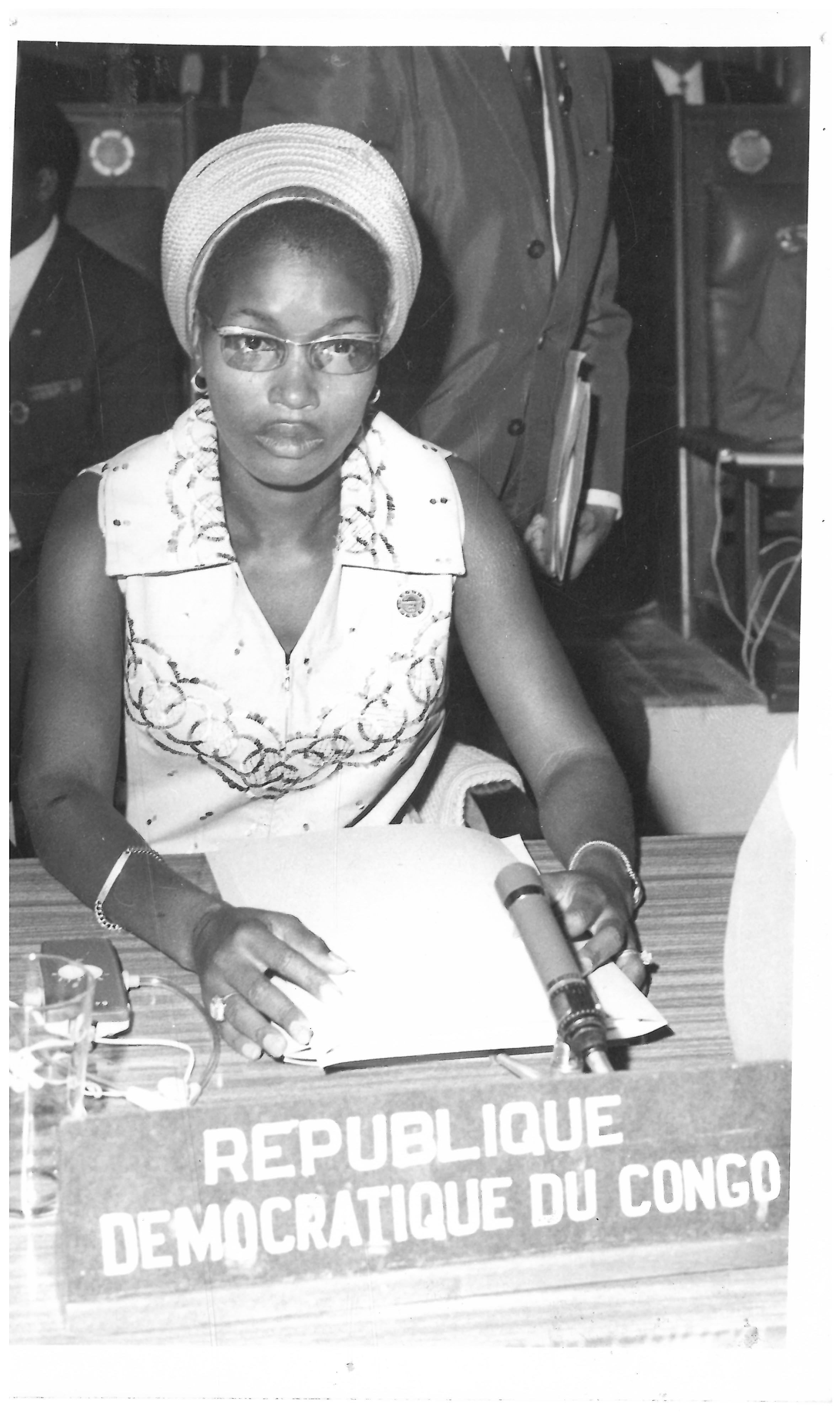

Minister of Social Affairs of the Democratic Republic of the Congo
- In office 31 October 1966 – 6 December 1970

Personal details
- Born: Sophie Madeline Kanza; 8 February 1940 Léopoldville, Belgian Congo
- Died: 2 April 1999 (aged 59) Kinshasa, Democratic Republic of the Congo
- Party: Mouvement Populaire de la Révolution
- Spouse: Marcel Lihau (m. 1964)
- Children: 6
- Education: University of Geneva; Harvard University

Sophie Lihau-Kanza or Zala Lusibu N'Kanza (8 February 1940 – 2 April 1999) was a Congolese politician and sociologist. She was the first woman of her country to receive a secondary education, the first to graduate from a university, and the first to hold a government office in the Democratic Republic of the Congo, serving as Minister of Social Affairs from 31 October 1966 to 6 December 1970. In her later life she held positions within the United Nations.

== Early life and education ==
Sophie Kanza was born on 8 February 1940 in Léopoldville, Belgian Congo, the sixth of seven children to Élisabeth Mansangaza and Daniel Kanza. She received much of her primary and secondary education in Brazzaville, French Congo. At the time of the Belgian Congo's independence in 1960, Kanza was the only woman in the country who had been enrolled in secondary education. She eventually graduated from Lycée du Sacré Cœur (Sacred Heart High School) in June 1961. (Note: The Lycée du Sacré Cœur was a boys school, but Kanza graduated from there because the girls school she attended in the Congo had closed following the departure of many Belgian educators from the country in 1960.) In 1964, she became the first Congolese woman to graduate from a university when she received her diploma from the University of Geneva with a degree in sociology; she worked in the same department for the university as an assistant lecturer until 1966. Kanza studied at Harvard University from 1973 to 1976, earning a master's degree and a PhD in sociology.

== Political career ==
On 31 October 1966, Kanza was appointed Minister of Social Affairs, becoming the first woman in the country to hold government office. Her appointment came while she was pursuing a PhD at the University of Geneva, but she ended her studies to assume office. She spent most of her initial time in office examining the ministry's struggles to meet the needs of the population. She also advocated for equal education opportunities for both boys and girls, and served as a delegate to the Organisation of African Unity summit in Kinshasa (formerly Léopoldville) in 1967. She was made a member of the political bureau of the Mouvement Populaire de la Révolution on 13 October 1967. She was dismissed as Minister of Social Affairs in a cabinet reshuffle on 6 December 1970. From 1973 until 1977, Kanza was a member of the Board of Trustees of the United Nations Institute for Training and Research (UNITAR). She was Deputy Assistant Director-General of the United Nations Educational, Scientific and Cultural Organisation (UNESCO) from 1981 to 1985, and Head of Mission to the Director-General of UNESCO from 1985 to 1988.

== Personal life ==
Kanza married Marcel Lihau, future President of the Supreme Court of Justice, on 26 December 1964, and they had six daughters. However, he fled political persecution in the Congo and they spent most of their later lives separated.

In 1998, Kanza was involved in a car accident in Paris, and she became a paraplegic. After this, she left her job at UNESCO and traveled abroad to advocate for disabled people.

== Death and legacy ==
Kanza suffered cardiac arrest and died on 2 April 1999. She was buried in the Luozi Territory.

In 2004, Kanza was inducted into the Congo's Pantheon of National History, one of the first women to be accorded the honour. Her bust is displayed in the Gallery of Memory. The "Cercle Sophie Kanza", an association of female professors in the Congo, was named in her honour. Three of Kanza's daughters organized a mass of thanksgiving in honor of herself and her husband in Gombe on 28 March 2015. Several important politicians attended the ceremony, including Léon Kengo and José Endundo Bononge. On 25 September 2025, a street in Ixelles, Belgium, was named in her honour.
