= Luluabourg Constitution =

The Luluabourg Constitution, published in Moniteur Congolais

The Luluabourg Constitution (French: Constitution de Luluabourg) was the second constitution of the Democratic Republic of the Congo. Functional from 1 August 1964 until November 1965, it was meant to replace the basic law (Loi Fondamentale) that had been provisionally enacted when independence was declared in 1960. Unlike its predecessor, the Luluabourg Constitution featured a strong executive presidency and carefully delineated federalism between the central government and the provinces. It also formalized the adoption of the name "Democratic Republic of the Congo", succeeding the name "Republic of the Congo".

== Background ==
=== The Loi Fondamentale ===
It was decided at the Belgo-Congolese Round Table Conference of 1960 that the resolutions the participants adopted would serve as the basis for the Loi Fondamentale (Fundamental Law), a temporary draft constitution left for the Congo until a permanent one could be promulgated by a Congolese parliament within a few years of independence. The constitution stipulated a division of executive power between a presumably symbolic head of state and a head of government. As in a parliamentary system, executive power was to be exercised by a prime minister and a cabinet responsible to Parliament. If the cabinet lost the confidence of Parliament, a motion of censure would be passed and it would be dismissed. By comparison, the head of state (a president) was irresponsible to Parliament and only had the power to ratify treaties, promulgate laws, and nominate high-ranking officials (including the prime minister and the cabinet). In Belgium, parliamentary tradition had rendered these duties inconsequential in the face of the premier's influence. In the Congo, no such convention had been established. A parliament was to be composed of a lower chamber, the Chamber of Deputies, and an upper chamber, the Senate.

The constitution delineated the authority of the central and provincial governments. Among the central government's duties and responsibilities were foreign affairs, national defence, domestic security, customs and currency, communications, major public works, higher education, national judiciary, and economic planning. In areas where the provincial and central governments took contradictory stances, the central government's positions took precedence. The division of authority, a compromise between the federalist and unitarianist politicians, was dubbed by Belgian lawyers as "quasi-federalism". A state commissioner would be appointed by the head of state with the consent of the Senate to represent the central government in each province. Their main duties were to "administer state services" and "assure coordination of provincial and central institutions."

The Loi Fondamentale proved a complicated and cumbersome document for the politically inexperienced Congolese. On 5 July 1960, five days after independence, the Congolese army mutinied, plunging the country into crisis. National political opinion quickly turned against the constitution, with some national figures, such as Joseph Iléo, attributing the national crisis to flawed institutional arrangements. Early constitutional debates in the country focused on whether the state should be formed in a unitary or federal fashion, though the secession of Katanga Province evolved the argument into a comparison of the merits of a federal or confederal system. The end of the secession and several political conferences led the federalist side to win out.

=== Constitutional drafting ===
On 27 November 1963, President Joseph Kasa-Vubu announced the formation of a new "Constitutional Commission" with 120 members. The body represented 10 specific segments of Congolese society: the central government, the provincial assemblies, the provincial governments, syndicates, major employers, rural collectives, the National Youth Council, the media, student organisations, and religious organisations. The commission convened on 10 January 1964 in Luluabourg, with Marcel Lihau serving as its secretary and Iléo as its president. The commission was mandated to produce a draft within 100 days of its convention. A draft was completed by 11 April, but its presentation to the public was delayed as Kasa-Vubu's government and the commission debated over which entity held the prerogative to make revisions. Kasa-Vubu eventually yielded. The resulting document was mostly a compensation for what its authors perceived to be the shortfalls of the Loi Fondamentale. Its principal features were a centralized and strengthened executive and a punctilious separation of responsibilities between the central and provincial governments.

On 1 May, the central government established a committee chaired by the Minister of Interior to organise a national referendum to ratify the constitution. Polling was conducted from 25 June to 15 July, though votes were not collected in some areas due to political violence and rebellion. The "Luluabourg Constitution", as it became known, was adopted with 80 percent approval. Kasa-Vubu formally promulgated it on 1 August 1964. An official text in French was printed in the Ministry of Justice's Moniteur Congolese.

== Summary ==
=== National organisation ===
The constitution formally changed the name of the country from "Republic of the Congo" to "Democratic Republic of the Congo" and adopted a new national flag. It organised the country as 21 provinces with Léopoldville, the capital, as its own federal district. The state was declared "indivisible". The central government was granted 35 enumerated powers, the provinces were given 20 powers, and 10 were to be exercised concurrently. Residuary powers were reserved to the provinces.

=== Nationality ===
Article 6 restricted Congolese nationality solely to persons whose ancestors were a part of an ethnic group that had lived in the Congo before 18 October 1908. This rule could be circumvented if a person submitted a formal request to change their nationality within 12 months of the promulgation of the constitution.

=== Presidency ===
According to the constitution, the president "determines and directs the policy of the state" and "establishes the framework of government action, supervises its application, and informs Parliament of its development". The president was also granted control over foreign affairs and made responsible for negotiating treaties. With regards to legislative affairs, the president promulgated all laws, could formally propose legislation for Parliament's consideration, and could call Parliament into extraordinary session. The president was empowered to forestall passed legislation by suggesting amendments, though Parliament could override his proposals with a two-thirds majority vote.

The president was to be selected by an electoral college composed of members of Parliament, members from every provincial assembly, and several delegates from the capital with the number of them being determined by how much representation they would be accorded to in Parliament based on population. The capital delegates and parliamentary delegates would meet in the capital to cast their vote, while the provincial assembly electors would do the same from their respective provincial capitals. All presidential candidates had to be at least 40 years of age. The president was to be chosen by the candidate with a simple majority. If this was not achieved on the first two ballots, then the candidate with a plurality on the third would become president. The president was to serve a five year term of office.

=== Premiership and government ===
The office of prime minister was retained, but its functions and responsibilities were largely reduced. The prime minister and all other cabinet ministers were to be named and revoked either individually or collectively by the president. The choice of prime minister was subject to the president's discretion, though other ministers were to be appointed upon the suggestion of the prime minister. All ministers were subject to confirmation by Parliament. The number of ministers was capped at 15. The prime minister and the cabinet together comprised the country's "government".

=== Parliament ===
The constitution retained a bicameral Parliament with a Chamber of Deputies elected by popular vote and a Senate elected by provincial assemblies. While the national government was not formally made responsible to Parliament, Parliament was given the right to ask the government questions, file interpellations, conduct hearings through commissions, issue remonstrances, and—in specific instances—pursue criminal penalties for the president and members of the government for violations of the constitution and organic laws.

=== Judiciary ===
The constitution retained the country's judicial structure. It also called for the organisation of a Constitutional Court within 12 years.

=== Provinces ===
Each province was guaranteed a republican form of government their own constitutions and assemblies. The assemblies elected provincial presidents.

== Historical application ==
The Luluabourg Constitution denied citizenship to most Rwandan immigrants in the Congo. Marcel Bisukiro, a former government minister, criticised it as discriminatory.

The constitution called for new parliamentary elections to be held within nine months of adoption followed by a presidential election. In the interim, the incumbent exercised the new powers accorded to his office. Parliamentary elections were held in March 1965 according to the document but a political impasse occurred before a president could be selected. Following a coup on 24 November 1965, Colonel Joseph Mobutu became president of the country and the constitution was suspended, though he announced that his regime would respect citizens' civil rights as enumerated by it. Under Mobutu, moves were made to institutionally centralise the country, including the elimination of multiple provinces. A new constitution was promulgated on 24 June 1967.
