= Marcel Lihau =

Congolese jurist, law professor and politician

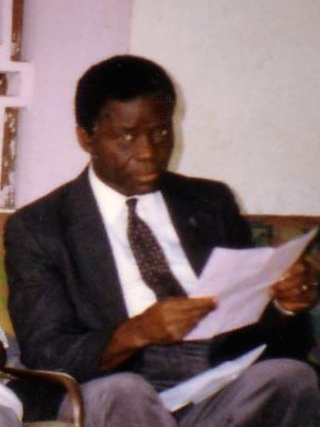
- Lihau c. 1990

First President of the Supreme Court of Justice of the Democratic Republic of the Congo (Note: The country was renamed Zaire in 1971.)
- In office 23 November 1968 – June 1975
- President: Joseph-Desiré Mobutu
- Preceded by: Office established
- Succeeded by: Bayona Bameya

Secretary of State for Justice of the Republic of the Congo
- In office 9 February 1961 – 2 August 1961
- President: Joseph Kasa-Vubu
- Prime Minister: Joseph Iléo
- Succeeded by: Paul Bolya

Commissioner-General of Justice of the Republic of the Congo
- In office September 1960 – 9 February 1961
- Deputy: Étienne Tshisekedi

Personal details
- Born: Marcel Antoine Lihau; 29 September 1931 Bumba, Équateur, Belgian Congo
- Died: 9 April 1999 (aged 67) Boston, Massachusetts, US
- Resting place: Gombe, Kinshasa
- Party: MPR (1971–1975); UDPS (1982–1993)
- Spouse: Sophie Kanza (m. 1964)
- Education: Catholic University of Leuven

Marcel Antoine Lihau or Ebua Libana la Molengo Lihau (29 September 1931 – 9 April 1999) was a Congolese jurist, law professor and politician who served as the inaugural First President of the Supreme Court of Justice of the Congo from 1968 to 1975, and was involved in the creation of two constitutions for the Democratic Republic of the Congo.

Lihau attended the Catholic University of Leuven in Belgium with the help of sympathetic Jesuit educators, becoming one of the first Congolese to study law. While there he encouraged Congolese politicians to form an alliance that allowed them to secure the independence of the Congo from Belgium. He served briefly as a justice official and negotiator for the Congolese central government before being appointed to lead a commission to draft a permanent national constitution. He was made dean of law faculty at Lovanium University in 1963. The following year he helped deliver the Luluabourg Constitution to the Congolese, which was adopted by referendum.

In 1965, Joseph-Desiré Mobutu seized total control of the country and directed Lihau to produce a new constitution. Three years later Lihau was appointed First President of the new Supreme Court of Justice of the Congo. He retained the position, advocating for judicial independence, until 1975, when he refused to force a harsh sentence upon student protesters. Lihau was summarily removed from his post by Mobutu and placed under house arrest. Becoming increasingly opposed to the government, he helped found the reform-oriented Union for Democracy and Social Progress. Mobutu responded by suspending his rights and banishing him to a rural village. His health in decline, Lihau sought refuge from political persecution in the United States in 1985, accepting a job as a professor of constitutional law at Harvard University. He continued to advocate for democracy in the Congo and returned to the country in 1990, to discuss political reform. He went back to the United States to seek medical treatment and died there in 1999.

== Early life and education ==
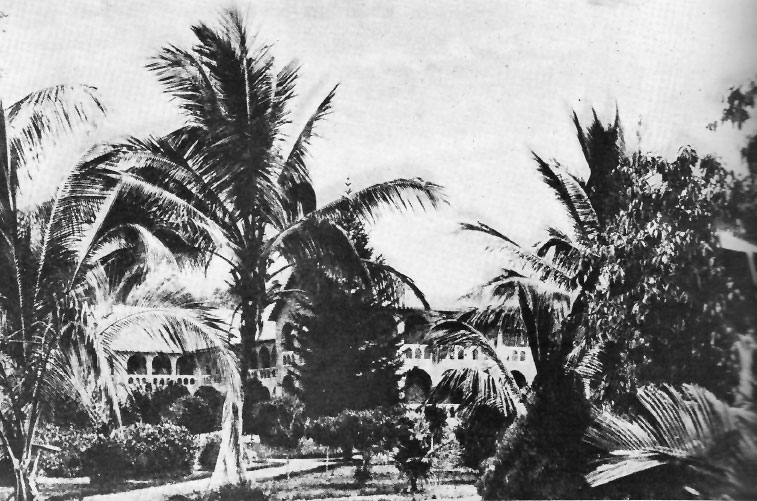
Jesuit mission in Kisantu, where Lihau received some of his tertiary education

Marcel Lihau was born on 29 September 1931 in Bumba, Équateur Province, Belgian Congo, (Note: According to Michel Luka of the newspaper Le Phare, Lihau was born in Lisala.) the eldest of eight children. After his secondary education at the Bolongo seminary, he attended the Jesuit University Centre in Kisantu, graduating from the school's administrative sciences division. One of Lihau's teachers, sociologist Willy De Craemer, resolved to help him enroll in the Catholic University of Leuven in Belgium, a school mostly unavailable to Congolese. To do this, De Craemer tutored him in Latin, Greek, and Flemish so he could take the Jury Central entrance exam. Lihau passed the test with a high score and was admitted to the university. Since it was his goal to study law (not permitted to Congolese students at the time), De Craemer and several sympathetic Jesuit educators arranged for Lihau to take the necessary classes under the cover of studying Roman philology. He also studied economics and philosophy. For the duration of his studies he stayed with the family of a former director of Radio Léopoldville, Karel Theunissen. Lihau served as president of the small Congolese-Ruanda-Urundi students' union in Belgium, Association Générale des Étudiants Congolais en Belgique (Note: General Association of Congolese Students in Belgium) (AGEC).

In 1958, a conference of Belgian missionaries was held to discuss expanding tertiary education in the Congo. As an invited speaker, Lihau encouraged Belgian clergy to join the side of Congolese activists and abandon what he referred to as an attitude of "clerical paternalism". In 1962, after spending time in the Congo, Lihau returned to Louvain to complete his studies. That year restrictions on Congolese education were loosened and Lihau became a Doctor of Philosophy law student. By the following January, he had become one of the first Congolese to receive a law degree, (Note: One Congolese mulatto, Victor Promontorio, began his legal studies in Brussels in 1930 and received his doctorate six years later.) earning it with distinction.

== Career and political activities ==
=== Early activities ===
On the eve of the Belgo-Congolese Round Table Conference in Brussels in January 1960, Lihau advised the Congolese political delegations to form a "Front Commun". (Note: Common Front) They did, and the decision significantly strengthened their bargaining position with the Belgian government. Lihau attended the political portion of the conference as an observer on behalf of the AGEC. While there, he presented two papers compiled by the AGEC. The first, entitled "The Congo Before Independence", led the president of the conference to create one commission to discuss the future of the Congo's political institutions and another to address the upcoming elections. The second paper, entitled "The Internal Political Organisation of the Congo", compared the merits of Federalism and Unitarianism and proposed that the Congolese adopt one system or the other to ensure the future integrity of their country. Before the conference dissolved, the Front Commun accepted the offer of the independence of the "Republic of the Congo" on 30 June 1960. In April and May, Lihau participated in the conference that addressed the Congo's planned economic transition.

=== Justice and judicial work ===
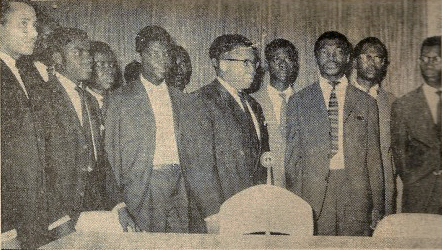
Lihau (centre left) with President Kasa-Vubu and the College of Commissioners

Shortly after independence, a widespread mutiny in the army and the secession of several provinces resulted in a domestic crisis. In August Lihau met with a UN official in New York who encouraged him to disseminate support of a reconciliation between the central government and the authorities of the rebellious "State of Katanga". President Joseph Kasa-Vubu dismissed Prime Minister Patrice Lumumba in September 1960 but the latter refused to leave his post, creating a political impasse. In response, Colonel Joseph-Desiré Mobutu launched a coup and displaced the parliamentary system. On 20 September, he announced the formation of the "College of Commissioners-General", a government made up of university students and graduates. Lihau was appointed Commissioner-General of Justice. (Note: According to the KongoTimes!, during his tenure Lihau was involved in Lumumba's death in January 1961. Conversely, Pistone and Kashamura write that Lihau was opposed to killing Lumumba. Hoskyns writes, "Though the authorities in Léopoldville certainly carried a moral responsibility for the [death], there is no reason to suppose that they ordered the [murder]. This is confirmed by the fact that the Commissariat of Justice went on preparing documents for Lumumba's trial till some time after his transfer, but a few days before the official announcement of his escape officials were ordered to close the files.") The college was dissolved on 9 February, and replaced by a new government under Prime Minister Joseph Iléo. Lihau was made Secretary of State for Justice. (Note: Though not of ministerial rank, Lihau led the Ministry of Justice while serving in the Iléo Government.) During this time he frequently worked with Belgian advisers.

Lihau traveled to Katanga in November 1960 to negotiate with the rebellious province's leaders. He assisted in organising and subsequently took part in the Léopoldville Conference in January 1961 to discuss political compromise and reform. He also participated in the Tananarive Conference in March and the following Coquilhatville Conference in April on behalf of Iléo to try to bring about a reconciliation among the dissident factions in the Congo. As result of the latter conference, Iléo created a commission to prepare a new constitution for the Congo and appointed Lihau to chair it. Lihau played a key role in the drafting process from that point forward. In June he joined Cyrille Adoula and Jean Bolikango in negotiating with the representatives of the Stanleyville government. Their meetings continued into July and resulted in the reconvening of Parliament and the Stanleyville government agreeing to disband. On 2 August the Iléo Government was replaced by a new government under Adoula. In January 1963, Lihau was hired to be professor and dean of the faculty of law at Lovanium University (later the National University of Zaire). He encouraged his students to adopt a constitutionalist approach to law.

On 27 November 1963, President Kasa-Vubu announced the formation of a new "Constitutional Commission". The commission convened on 10 January 1964 in Luluabourg, with Lihau serving as its secretary. A draft was completed by 11 April, but its presentation to the public was delayed as Kasa-Vubu's government and the commission debated over which faction held the prerogative to make revisions. Kasa-Vubu eventually yielded and the constitution was submitted for ratification to the Congolese electorate at the end of June. The "Luluabourg Constitution", as it was known, was adopted with 80 percent approval. On 26 July, Lihau was made a member of the Congolese section of the International Commission of Jurists. In 1965, another period of government paralysis led Mobutu to seize total control of the country. He requested that Lihau draft a new constitution, which was adopted on 24 June 1967.

On 14 August 1968, Lihau was named First President of the new Supreme Court of Justice of the Congo. He was officially installed in the position on 23 November. In his inaugural speech, Lihau requested "the scrupulous respect of all the authorities of the Republic the status of the magistracy guaranteeing independence in the exercise of its functions." Two years later he became editor of the new law journal La Revue Congolaise de Droit and also served as general delegate to the Office Nationale de la Recherche et du Developpement (Note: National Office of Research and Development) for its judicial, political, and social research division. Marcel Lihau soon adopted the name Ebua Libana la Molengo Lihau, as per the encouraged Africanisation in accordance with Mobutu's policy of Authenticité. As a judge, he believed that the term "law" applied "not only to legislative acts, but also to regulatory acts which are at least not illegal, as well as international treaties and ratified agreements". In 1971, Lihau was inducted into the executive committee of the state-sanctioned party, Mouvement Populaire de la Révolution (Note: Popular Movement of the Revolution) (MPR). Three years later he was made a commissioner of its political bureau. That year, a new constitution was promulgated that concentrated the government's authority in Mobutu as president. Lihau supported the independence of the judiciary and, despite Mobutu's centralisation, interpreted the document as only veiling such autonomy, not eliminating it. He explained that the constitution's references to the "Judicial Council" (a section of the MPR) in place of the previous term "Judicial Power" were, though obfuscating, done only for political reasons and signified no real change. He surmised, "[T]he attributions of courts and tribunals have remained the same as in the past, even if the spirit in which they declare the law will necessarily be different." However, this interpretation ran contrary to Mobutu's ideals. In June 1975, Lihau refused to enforce a harsh sentence levied against student protesters. He was subsequently dismissed from the Supreme Court, (Note: The official dismissal order, which was cited in a press release, stated that Lihau was removed for contradicting President Mobutu and the ideals of the MPR.) removed from his teaching position, and placed under house arrest.

=== Opposition to Mobutu ===
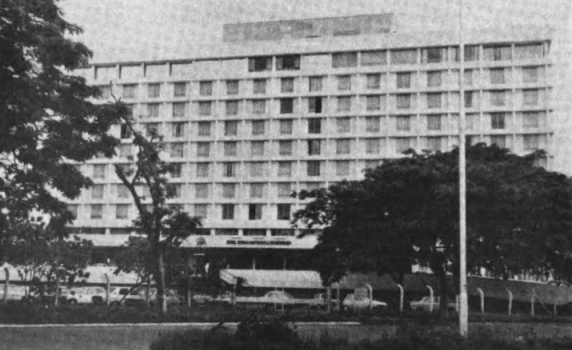
Lihau joined opposition deputies in interrupting a government meeting at the Hotel InterContinental (pictured) in 1983.

In 1980, 13 members of Parliament published a letter criticising Mobutu's regime and were arrested for "aggravated treason". Lihau testified on their behalf during the ensuing trial. Two years later he joined them in founding the Union pour la Démocratie et le Progrès Social (Note: Union for Democracy and Social Progress) (UDPS) as an opposition party to Mobutu; Lihau soon became the new party's president. Mobutu was particularly disturbed by Lihau's membership in the party since, as a native of Équateur Province, he added to the geographic diversity of the organisation and therefore its political clout. In retaliation, Mobutu incarcerated him, suspended his rights, confiscated his personal property, and eventually banished him to the village of Yamake in Équateur Province. In August 1983, Lihau joined several of his colleagues in attempting to interrupt a meeting between government officials and United States Congressmen at the Hotel InterContinental in Kinshasa while wearing Western suits and ties (then banned by Mobutu). A violent struggle between the UDPS members and Mobutu's security police ensued in full view of the American delegation and received a great amount of media attention in the United States.

By 1985, Lihau's health had deteriorated and he was attempting to seek political asylum abroad. His application to Belgian authorities was refused. Harvard University invited him to become a visiting scholar at its campus in the United States. David Heaps, chairman of the board of Human Rights Internet, convinced Mobutu to let Lihau leave the country. He was subsequently granted political asylum in the United States, and moved to Cambridge, Massachusetts, to become a professor of constitutional law at Harvard. Meanwhile, in the Congo Mobutu persecuted the UDPS leadership, making it nearly impossible for Party President Étienne Tshisekedi to participate in political activities. In early 1988, a dozen party executives traveled to Boston and convinced Lihau to assume the presidency of the UDPS. The following year Lihau founded a political conference with the goal of democratising the Congo.

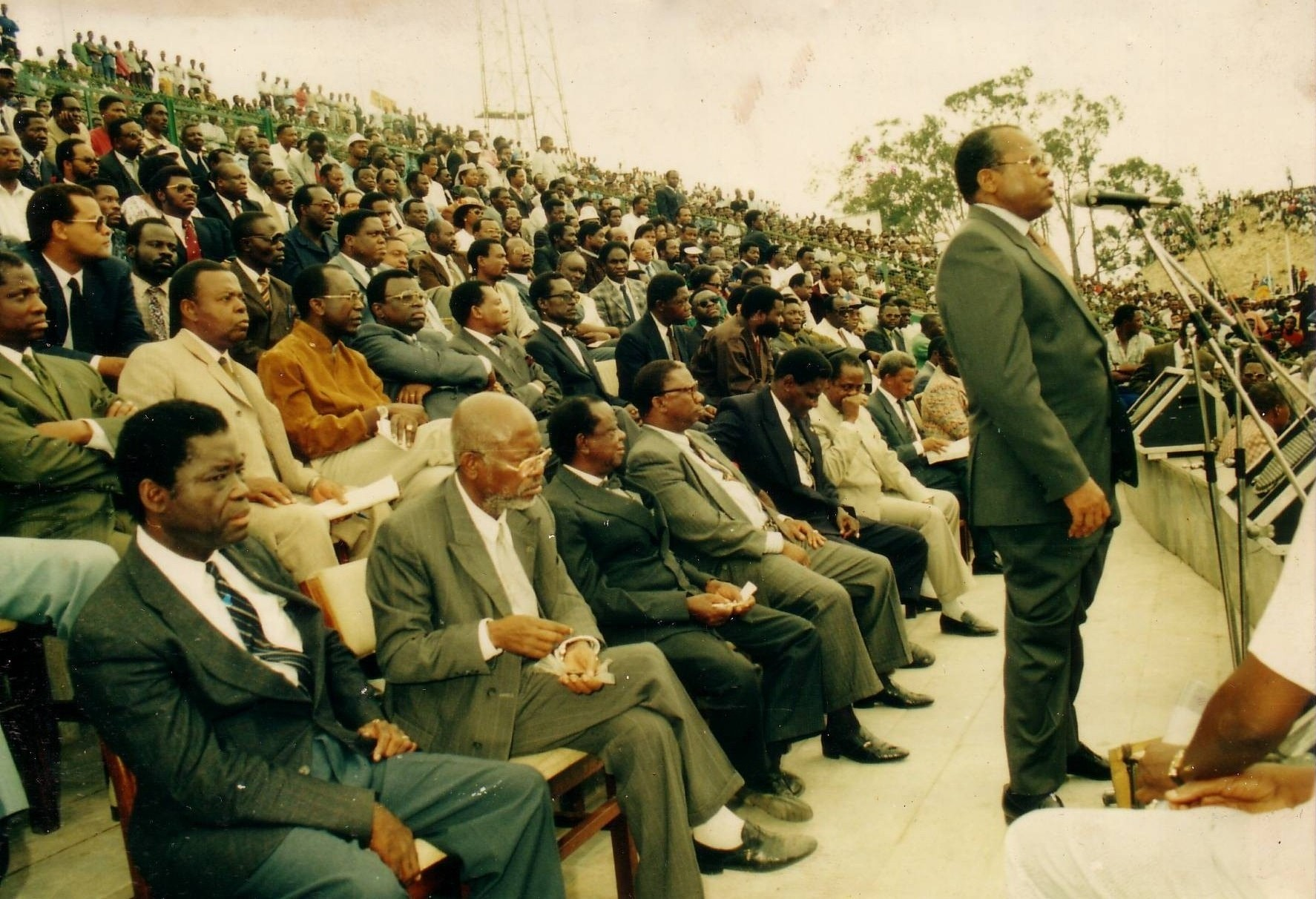
First meeting of the Union Sacrée de l'Opposition Radicale in Kinshasa in 1991. Lihau is seated in the first chair in the front row.

In April 1990, Mobutu announced he would accommodate multi-party politics. Lihau, who was at the time presiding over a meeting of exiled politicians in Brussels, demanded that before opposition elements returned to the country Mobutu's government guarantee the tolerance of a genuine multi-party system, agree to organise a round table conference for political reconciliation, and begin disbanding state security forces. On 22 May, he visited the United States Department of State in Washington D.C. Lihau returned to the Congo and became one of four directors of the UDPS under a reformed leadership model. The UDPS then entered a coalition with other opposition groups to form the Union Sacrée de l'Opposition, and he served on the union's ruling council. He joined the UDPS in endorsing the formation of a "Conference Nationale Souveraine" (Note: National Sovereign Conference) to discuss political reform in the country. One soon convened, but Lihau protested the large number of delegates summoned by Mobutu to participate, accusing him of trying to stack the representation in his own favor. Throughout the conference's existence Lihau chaired its constitutional commission. At one point during the conference, he denounced the perceived Baluba dominance of the UDPS and joined the Alliance des Bangala (ALIBA), a party with financial support from Mobutu that promoted politicians from Équateur. Eventually the constitutional commission produced a draft recommendation of a federal system that was intended to maintain the national integrity of the Congo while respecting its diversity. The conference disbanded in December 1992 having greatly reinvigorated democratic thought in the country but ultimately failing to enact significant institutional change. Lihau went back to the United States to receive medical treatment.

In June 1993, Lihau delivered a speech on television and radio, denouncing the Kasaian ethnic dominance of the UDPS and Tshisekedi's leadership. The UDPS then labeled him a "traitor" for his association with ALIBA and announced that it interpreted his statements as a resignation from the party. Kasaians close to Tshisekedi were incensed by Lihau's comments and considered assassinating him and fixing blame on Mobutu and Prime Minister Faustin Birindwa.

== Personal life and death ==
Like every man, Marcel Lihau made mistakes ... However, notwithstanding these moments of weakness, he maintained his lucidity not to undermine the healthiness of the party for which he had sacrificed long years among the most active of his life. We will always be grateful ... May this memory of gentleness, honesty and integrity left by Marcel Lihau endure forever!

— Statement by the UDPS leadership upon Lihau's death (translated from French)

Lihau married future politician Sophie Kanza on 26 December 1964. They had six daughters: Elisabeth, Anne, Irene, Catherine, Rachel and Sophie. The couple separated in the late 1970s, and Lihau saw little of his family during his years in the United States. In Lihau's later life a young politician named Jean-Pierre Kalokola claimed to be his illegitimate son. In response, Lihau successfully filed a lawsuit against him. After Lihau's death, Kalokola legally adopted his surname. Lihau's daughters denounced the action as a ploy by Kalokola to further his own political career. In 2019, National Deputy Dismas Mangbengu declared that Kalokola was not Lihau's son, and Kalokola responded by threatening to sue Mangbengu. The Lihau family issued a statement requesting Mangbengu not to involve himself in a private family matter.

Lihau died on 9 April 1999, in Boston, seven days after the death of his wife in Kinshasa. He was initially buried in a Boston cemetery before his body was exhumed and entombed in Gombe, Kinshasa, on 12 May. Lihau's family never requested an autopsy. In 2001, Kalokola, ostensibly on behalf of the Lihau family, filed a complaint against unknown persons with the Attorney General of Kinshasa, claiming that Lihau had been murdered. He based his assertion on a strange visit that Lihau supposedly had with someone the day after the death of his wife and on unusual signs that were observed on Lihau's body when it was brought to Kinshasa.

John Dickie and Alan Rake described Lihau as "reserved and rather uncommunicative" but in possession of an "excellent legal mind". According to diplomat Jean-Claude N. Mbwankiem, he was "one of the best constitutionalists that the [Congo] has ever known". In 2009, a ceremony was held in memory of Lihau in Kinshasa during which a courtroom was dedicated in his name. Three of Lihau's and Kanza's daughters organised a mass of thanksgiving in their parents' honor in Gombe on 28 March 2015. Several prominent politicians attended the ceremony, including Léon Kengo wa Dondo and José Endundo Bononge.
