= Justin Bomboko =

Leader of the Congolese government from 1960–1961

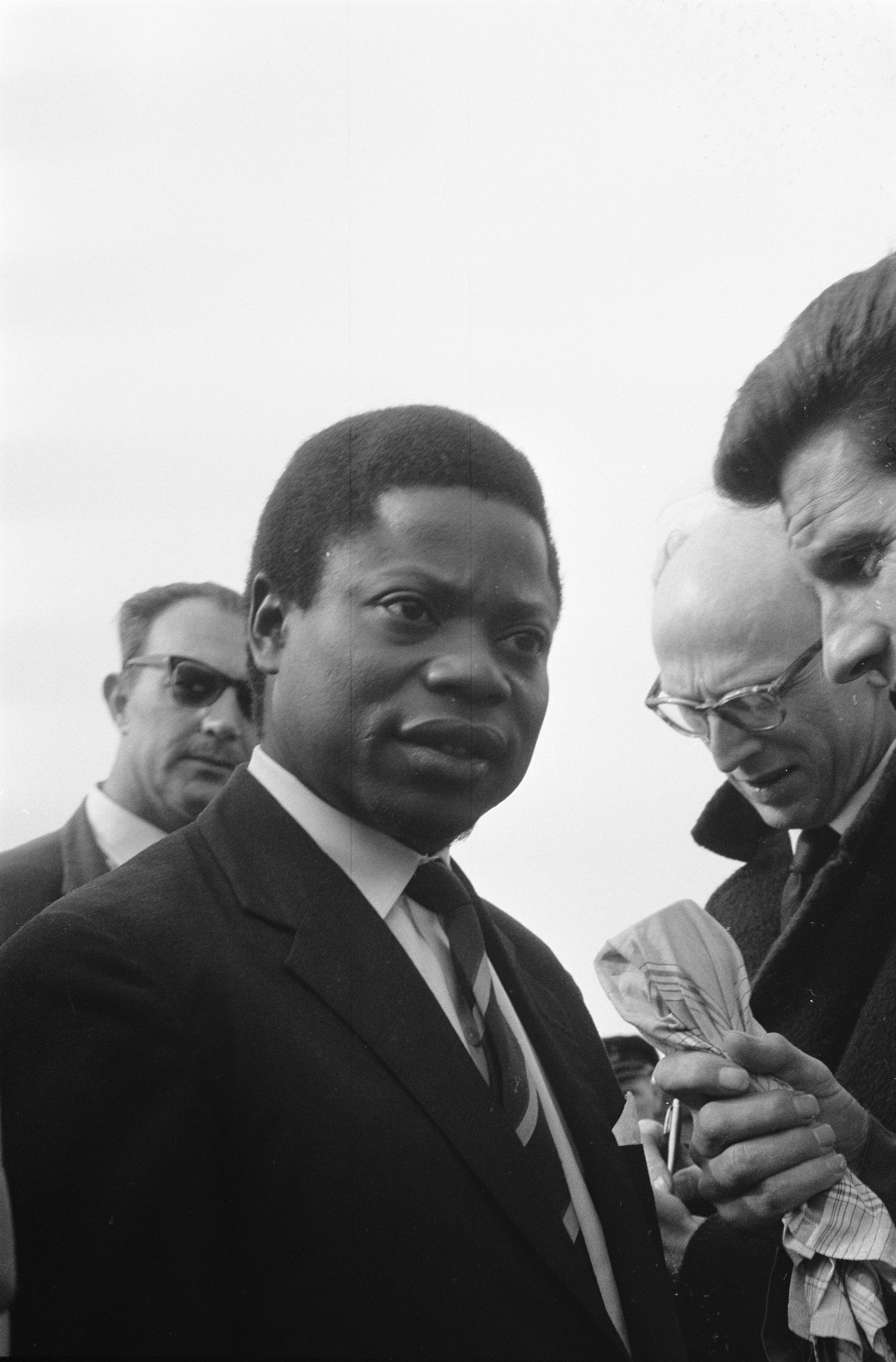
- Bomboko in 1960

Chairman of the Board of Commissioners-General of Congo-Léopoldville
- In office 3 October 1960 – 9 February 1961
- President: Joseph Kasa-Vubu
- Deputy: Albert Ndele
- Preceded by: Joseph Iléo (as Prime Minister)
- Succeeded by: Joseph Iléo (as Prime Minister)

Personal details
- Born: 22 September 1928 Boleke, Belgian Congo (Now Congo-Kinshasa)
- Died: 10 April 2014 (aged 85) Brussels, Belgium
- Party: Union of Mongo

Justin-Marie Bomboko Lokumba Is Elenge (22 September 1928 – 10 April 2014), was a Congolese politician and statesman. He was the Minister of Foreign Affairs for the Congo. He served as leader of the Congolese government as chairman of the College of Commissioners. He also served as Foreign Minister for three different tenures: 1960–1963, 1965–1969, and again in 1981. Bomboko died from a long-illness in Brussels, Belgium, aged 85.

== Early life ==
Justin-Marie Bomboko was born on 22 September 1928 in Boleke, Belgian Congo.

== Government career ==
In June 1960, Patrice Lumumba was tasked with forming the Republic of the Congo's first independent government. He weighed his options for the Minister of Foreign Affairs between Thomas Kanza, André Mandi, and Bomboko. Lumumba mistrusted Bomboko, whom the Belgians supported and with whom he had political differences. Kanza, who was well acquainted with Bomboko, suggested that he should receive charge of Foreign Affairs, because he was an elected deputy and had more political support. Lumumba eventually agreed to this proposal, but made Mandi Secretary of State for Foreign Affairs so he could monitor his activities. Bomboko and Kanza ended up being the only two ministers in the government with university degrees. The government was officially invested by Parliament on 24 June. On 29 June Bomboko and Lumumba signed the Treaty of Friendship, Assistance, and Co-operation with their Belgian counterparts. On 30 June, Independence Day, they together signed the accords officially conferring sovereignty upon the Congo. In the days immediately after independence, Bomboko was mostly preoccupied with the establishment of his ministry. He was upset by the fact that most foreign contacts were made either through the entire government or through Lumumba, instead of directly through him.

On 5 July, the Force Publique garrisons of Léopoldville and Thysville mutinied. The revolt spread the next morning to other towns across the Lower Congo. Several soldiers had been convinced that Lumumba had brought Soviet troops into the country to disarm the Force Publique. Angered by this, they stormed the hotel rooms of the Soviet delegation (which had been present for the independence celebrations). Upon hearing what had occurred, Lumumba directed Bomboko to assume responsibility of the security of all foreign delegations present in the Congo and ensure that the Soviets could safely depart. He also devoted much of his time to assisting European residents that wanted to escape the violence and leave the country. On 10 July, Belgian troops staged a military intervention to protect their nationals and began occupying portions of the Congo. Later that morning, Bomboko met with fleeing Belgians at N'djili Airport. While there he declared that the Belgian intervention had been made at his request, though this was most likely untrue and probably only said to ease tensions; no record of any such request has ever been found, and the Belgians never cited one when attempting to justify their intervention. An interpellation was subsequently levied against him by Parliament concerning his involvement in the matter. On 15 July he appeared before Parliament to reject accusations of personal "complicity" in regards to the Belgian intervention and to affirm his concurrence with the actions taken by Prime Minister Lumumba and President Joseph Kasa-Vubu to restore order. On 28 July he was made a member of a cabinet committee tasked with managing the government's relations with the United Nations.

== Honours ==
- 1963 : Knight Grand Cross of the Order of the Crown.
- 2010 : Grand Cordon of the Order of the National Heroes Kabila-Lumumba.

== Citations ==
Political offices
Preceded by Joseph Iléo	Prime Minister of the Democratic Republic of the Congo; 14 September 1960 – 9 February 1961	Succeeded by Joseph Iléo
