= Constitution of the Democratic Republic of the Congo =

The Constitution of the Democratic Republic of the Congo (French: Constitution de la République démocratique du Congo) is the basic law governing the Democratic Republic of the Congo. The Constitution has been changed and/or replaced several times since its independence in 1960.

== Current Constitution ==
The Democratic Republic of the Congo is now under the regime of the constitution which was approved in a referendum by the Congolese people, and promulgated on February 18, 2006 by President Joseph Kabila. It is the Democratic Republic of the Congo's sixth constitution since 1960.

=== General provisions ===
New political subdivisions were brought by this constitution. The country is divided in 25 provinces, and the capital-city of Kinshasa – to take full-effect 36 months after the official installation of the newly elected President, which occurred on December 6, 2006. The motto of the country is : "Justice, Peace, Work".

=== Political pluralism ===
Creating and belonging to a political party is a civil and political right for all Congolese people. Political parties must obey the law on political parties, respect public order and operate in accordance with "good mores". Parties receive subsidies from the government for their electoral campaign. Having a one-party-system is expressly unconstitutional.

=== Nationality and citizenship ===
Congolese citizenship is exclusive. Double citizenship is therefore impossible in theory. Anyone belonging to the ethnic groups whose persons and territory constituted what became Congo (currently the Democratic Republic of the Congo) at independence is a Congolese national.

Any Congolese national who has not lost his/her political rights, by virtue of a court decision, or by virtue of the law, is a Congolese citizen.

=== Rights and duties ===
Civil, political, economic, social, cultural and collective rights, as well as the duties of all citizens, are defined in Title II of the constitution – the unofficial bill of rights and duties. Title II also states that ignorance of the law is not a valid defense in court, or anywhere.

The new constitution limits marriage, in article 40, as the right to « marry the person of one's choice, of the opposite sex, and to create a family »; thus, it forbids same-sex marriage.

== Constitutional history ==
The country's first, provisional, constitution was the fundamental law of 1960, which was based on the Constitution of Belgium and established a parliamentary republic. A new constitution, dated August 1, 1964, strengthened the powers of the presidency, enhanced still further by the June 24, 1967 charter.

The Congo was renamed Zaire in 1971, and a new constitution was adopted in August 1974. It concentrated virtually all power in the hands of President Mobutu Sese Seko. This document was revised on February 15, 1978, and amended on July 5, 1990. A transitional constitution was then promulgated in April 1994.

A Constitutional Act was promulgated in May 1997; draft constitution was proposed but not finalized in March 1998. From April 2, 2003, the country was under a Transition Constitution, which was established as a result of the 2002 Global and Inclusive Agreement of Sun City, South Africa that ended the Second Congo War. This document was in effect until the current constitution came into force on February 18, 2006.

== Gallery ==
The "Luluabourg Constitution" of 1964, published in Moniteur Congolais.

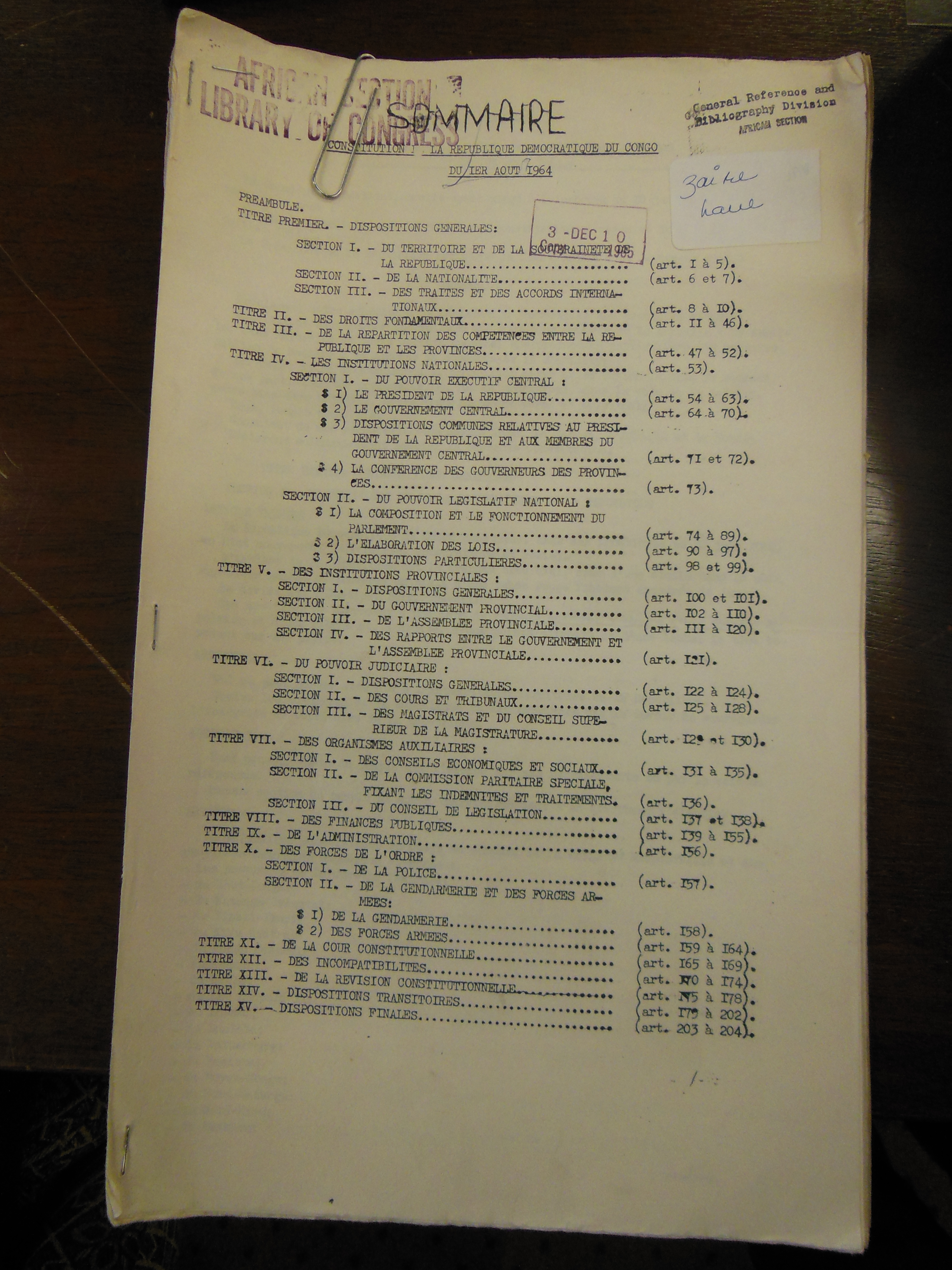
Table of Contents of the "Luluabourg Constitution" of 1964.

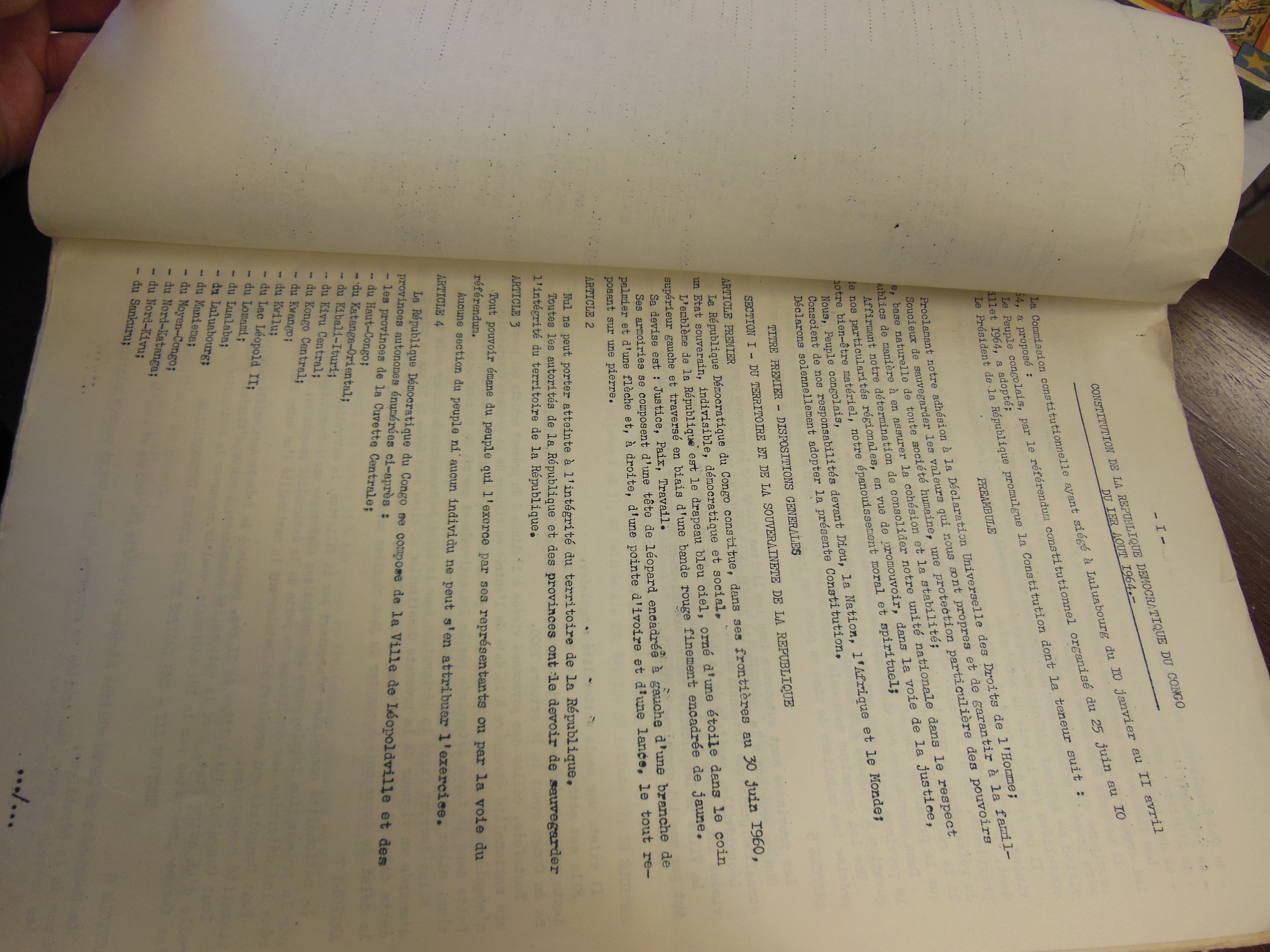
First page of the "Luluabourg Constitution" of 1964.

== See also ==
- Government of the Democratic Republic of the Congo
- Marcel Lihau
