= Conseil National de Libération =

National Liberation Council Conseil National de Libération
- President: Christophe Gbenye
- Founded: October 1963
- Dissolved: 1960s
- Armed wing: Armée Populaire de Libération (Simba rebels)
- Ideology: Congolese nationalism Lumumbism; Anti-imperialism; Anti-Western sentiment African socialism
- Political position: Left-wing to far left

The Conseil National de Libération (CNL, "National Liberation Council"), also known as Comité National de Libération, was a political coalition and revolutionary militant organization in the Democratic Republic of the Congo (Congo-Léopoldville) during the Congo Crisis of the 1960s. It was originally founded as an émigré political group and union of various dissident parties in neighbouring Congo-Brazzaville in October 1963, aiming to topple the Adoula government by mobilizing an armed insurrection. These efforts resulted in the Simba rebellion of 1963–1965, as the CNL mobilized a series of uprisings by insurgent forces which were collectively dubbed the "Simbas".

Though the Simba rebels were nominally part of the CNL's armed wing, the Armée Populaire de Libération, the political coalition's control over the insurgent units fluctuated widely. The Simbas temporarily conquered much of eastern DR Congo, with the CNL leader Christophe Gbenye proclaiming the "People's Republic of the Congo", but the rebels quickly descended into infighting and were pushed backed by pro-government forces. By late 1965, the CNL had fractured into rival groups in exile and the Simbas were reduced to a number of holdouts in rural areas.

== History ==
=== Foundation ===
After the suppression of the Katangese secession in early 1963, political negotiations began to reconcile the disparate political factions in Congo-Léopoldville. At the same time, Congolese nationalist parties in the Congolese parliament voiced growing opposition to the Adoula government over its increasingly pro-Western policies. In particular, the growing power of the Binza group on the government was viewed critically by nationalists. The Adoula government was repeatedly reshuffled to further reduce the nationalists' influence. Dissident factions within and outside the Congo began to plot against the government, including militant members of the Mouvement National Congolais-Lumumba (MNC-L, Congolese National Movement) and Centre du Regroupement Africain (CEREA, Center of African Regrouping) in the eastern parts of the country. On 29 September 1963, President Joseph Kasa-Vubu dissolved the parliament to end the constant attacks on the Adoula government by the parliamentarians, though the official reasoning was the parliament's failure to agree on a constitution.

The parliament's dissolution further radicalized the Congolese opposition, and various nationalist parties as well as dissident émigrés decided to covertly meet in Brazzaville in October 1963. The opposition groups chose this city as a meeting place because President Alphonse Massamba-Débat of Congo-Brazzaville leaned toward socialism and was supportive of the exiles from Léopoldville. In Brazzaville, an extraordinary assembly was held and the attendees ultimately concluded that the Léopoldville government had to be overthrown through an armed revolution to achieve the Congo's full independence from the neocolonial Americans, Belgians, and pro-Western Congolese. For this purpose, the foundation of a coalition in form of the CNL was agreed upon by delegates representing the MNC-L, CEREA, Parti Solidaire Africain (PSA, African Mutual Party), Parti National de la Convention du Peuple (PNCP, National People's Convention Party), and the Union Démocratique Africaine (UDA, African Democratic Union).

Conversely, the CNL members were mainly dissidents or radical factions of the parties; for instance, the foundation of the CNL marked the complete rupture between the most radical and more moderate factions of the MNC-L. Furthermore, several member parties ultimately left the CNL, as the CEREA refused to sign the CNL's charter and the PNCP "abandoned the struggle". PSA leader Antoine Gizenga, imprisoned at the time, also refused to join the CNL to the surprise of his own party.

=== First armed operations and Madrid Agreement ===
After its foundation, the CNL sent several of its members into various regions of the DR Congo to prepare an armed rebellion. The CNL's founders were aware that PSA member Pierre Mulele had independently launched the Kwilu rebellion against the Léopoldville government, so they assigned no CNL member to the Kwilu area. President Massamba-Débat allowed the CNL to set up two training camps in Congo-Brazzaville, namely at Gamboma and Impfondo. The CNL also organized international support, and Chinese instructors probably began to operate at the two training camps. However, the Gamboma and Impfondo camps never attracted a great number of recruits.

The CNL infiltrated both western as well as eastern Congo in preparation for its revolution. In late 1963, Soumialot's forces began to launch attacks from Burundi into South Kivu. Additional training camps were set up in Burundi, Uganda, and Tanganyika; the governments of these states ignored demands by the Congolese government to expel CNL militants. In November 1963, CNL members organized a coup d'état attempt, with Binza group members Joseph-Désiré Mobutu (army commander) and Victor Nendaka Bika (Sûreté Nationale director) barely escaping with their lives.

Meanwhile, the political crisis in Léopoldville continued, with a new alliance emerging between different political groups. Most notably, CONAKAT leader Moïse Tshombe negotiated with various CNL factions to form a common front against Adoula. In February 1964, Tshombe and some CNL factions, including the CNL-Gbenye (mainly MNC-L) and the PSA-Gizenga signed the Madrid Agreement, secretly promising to work together as well as aim at the implementation of African socialism and the reduction of foreign influence in the Congo. Despite the agreement, however, differences remained; Tshombe was opposed to Adoula, but still willing to work with Kasa-Vubu, other Congolese parties, independent African states, and various Western powers. He covertly and simultaneously negotiated with all these rival groups. In April 1964, a coup d'état plot by CNL members was uncovered in Léopoldville.

=== Simba rebellion ===
From May 1964, CNL-affiliated militant groups began to launch attacks across the DR Congo. Militants carried out public bombings, kidnappings, and sabotage operations in the western regions, particularly targeting Léopoldville. They also captured a few towns at the border between Congo-Léopoldville and Congo-Brazzaville. (Note: A CNL force under Vital Pakassa and Michel Mongali captured Bolobo and Mushie for a short time in June 1964.) However, the CNL attacks in the western Congo had little impact and were quickly contained by the security forces. In general, the CNL lacked support among the urban population in Léopoldville, and many informers operated within the coalition due to its extensive factionalism. Many militants were thus arrested before they could even start their attacks in the west. In contrast, the pro-CNL forces achieved great successes in the east. A series of major revolts and invasions by CNL-affiliated militias were organized at several locations in the eastern Congo from May to June 1964, resulting in the rapid collapse of loyalist control in the region.

The Simbas' advance further destabilized the Adoula government. Tshombe exploited this and maneuvered himself into an advantageous position, for instance claiming that he could pacify the CNL due to his existing links to the opposition coalition. He also had the backing of the former Katangese Gendarmerie, a still-potent military force which could help to oppose the Simbas. The continued infighting and conspiracies in the capital ultimately resulted in Kasa-Vubu appointing Tshombe as prime minister in July 1964, replacing Adoula. Some CNL elements viewed this a satisfactory progress and agreed to abandon their opposition. The new Tshombe Government in Léopoldville thus included the CNL's Bocheley wing, with CNL/UDA member André Lubaya being appointed as Minister of Public Health. Tshombe also claimed that he was negotiating with the CNL forces in the eastern Congo (such as CNL-Gbenye), while releasing 2,000 political prisoners to signify his goodwill. Regardless, no agreements were reached between the Tshombe Government and the radical eastern CNL factions. The eastern CNL forces deemed Lubaya to be a collaborator for joining the government.

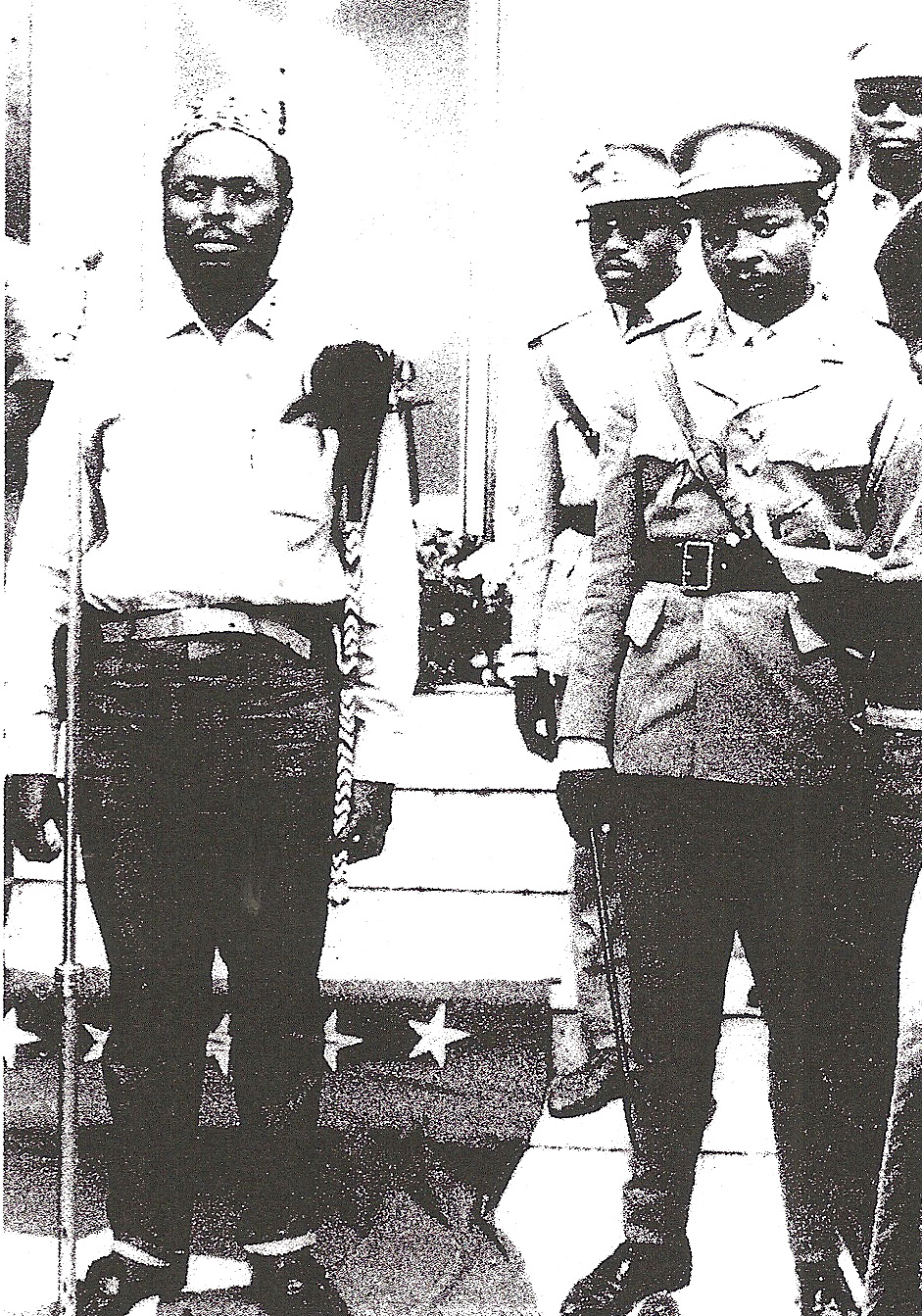
CNL leaders Christophe Gbenye (left) and Nicholas Olenga (2nd from right) in Stanleyville after the proclamation of the "People's Republic of Congo".

In August 1964, Simba rebels overran Stanleyville, whereupon the CNL proclaimed the "People's Republic of the Congo" under Christophe Gbenye. This marked the height of the rebel movement which subsequently began to decline as the Léopoldville government's counter-insurgency efforts became more effective and the United States as well as Belgium intervened in the conflict. At the same time, the Simbas became increasingly prone to infighting, while resorting to terror to cement their rule and purge their territories of perceived enemies; this quickly made the insurgents unpopular among the population of eastern Congo.

The combined pressure of pro-government forces and infighting resulted in the gradual loss of territory and collapse of the Simba forces throughout the Congo. Most CNL leaders and officials fled back into exile, though they continued to pose as leaders of the remaining rebel forces. By mid-1965, only a few CNL leaders such as Louis Bidalira remained at the frontlines. By the end of 1965, the Simba rebellion had been effectively defeated, with only some rebel holdouts persisting in rural areas.

== Organization ==
The CNL was mainly recruited from the MNC-L and the PSA. The CEREA, PNCP, and UDA were also founding members, but either did not fully join the CNL's armed efforts or later left the coalition. Some UDA elements continued to operate under the CNL's umbrella even after the party had opted to leave the opposition. From the start, the CNL heavily suffered from factionalism, and there existed various rival groups in the CNL as well as the wider Simba movement.

In terms of personnel, membership in the CNL fluctuated, partially due to misunderstandings, political changes, and factionalism. For instance, researcher Eric S. Packham described PSA leader Antoine Gizenga as a founding member of the CNL, even though Gizenga was imprisoned at the time of the CNL's foundation and later refused to join the CNL. CEREA politician Marcel Bisukiro was listed as a founding member in CNL documents despite not signing the coalition's position statement and opting to stay in Léopoldville. UDA leader André Lubaya joined the Tshombe Government as a CNL representative, but this was denounced by other CNL members. Albert Kalonji's political faction "sporadically" took part in the CNL until Kalonji also joined Tshombe's cabinet. Political scientist M. Crawford Young summarized that membership "tended to expand or contract according to the fortunes of the CNL at any given moment".

=== Known factions ===
- CNL-Bocheley, also known as Bocheley-Yumbu wing
- CNL-Gbenye

=== Known leading members ===
- Christophe Gbenye (MNC-L)
- André Lubaya (UDA)
- Louis Bidalira (MNC-L)
- Gaston Soumialot
- Gabriel Yumbu (PSA-G)
- Marandura Musa (MNC)
- Mukwidi (PSA)
- Ramazani (UFPC)
- Mokondo
- Nicholas Olenga
- Thomas Kanza
- Victor Hippolyte Benanga
- Theodore Bondhe
- Egide Bocheley-Davidson
- Matthieu Elonga Kaniki (also "Mathias Elonga")
- Norbert Ingende
- Laurent-Désiré Kabila
- Mathias Kemishanga
- Constantin-Marie Kibwe
- Benoit Lukumku
- Makangila
- Camille Khumu Mpia
- Augustin Makondo
- Ildephone Massengho
- Tony Nyatti
- Francois Sabiti
- Edouard Tupa
- Bernadette Kaputula

== Ideology ==
The CNL aimed at the "second independence" of the DR Congo, viewing the Léopoldville government as a neocolonial regime controlled by "lackeys of imperialism" who were beholden to the Americans and Belgians. For instance, CNL members dubbed the National Party of Progress (PNP) the "Party of Paid Negroes" due to the latter's accommodating positions towards Belgian interests. The CNL characterized its revolution as a way to achieve the complete decolonization of the DR Congo, "'economic prosperity', 'equal shares', peace, [and] 'complete freedom and democracy'". In the Madrid Agreement of February 1964, the CNL expressed its commitment to African socialism, pan-African efforts toward the decolonization of all of Africa, and anti-imperialist policies. The CNL was opposed to the division of the DR Congo. Within the broader "second independence" movement in the DR Congo, the CNL tended to represent the less radical groups which did not espouse Pierre Mulele's "comprehensive programme of social transformation".

A pro-Mulele faction existed in the CNL, composed of PSA-G "revolutionary intellectuals" who had trained in China, but it was opposed by the MNC-L faction of Gbenye. The PSA-G radicals eventually joined forces with the MNC-L splinter of Egide Bocheley-Davidson, forming the CNL-Bocheley. The main CNL force, still loyal to Gbenye, became known as the CNL-Gbenye and served as the umbrella group of the armed groups of Soumialot and Kabila.

The CNL's official ideology did not wholly permeate the wider Simba rebel movement. United States diplomat Monteagle Stearns argued that, "to the extent that the [Simba] movement had an ideology, it was an mixture of nationalism, village Marxism, and magic." Cuban military advisor Che Guevara similarly wrote that most Simba fighters did not adhere to the socialist views of their leaders, instead being motivated by their traditional belief systems such as dawa magic. For instance, Simba fighters tended to idolize Pierre Mulele as "patron saint", calling upon his alleged magical powers (Mai Mulele) to turn enemy bullets into water, even though Mulele led a distinct rebellion and was not part of the CNL. In eastern Congo, the CNL leaders generally exploited local political, social, and tribal grievances to recruit troops, meaning that many Simba fighters were more motivated by these grievances than questions of "class struggle". Researcher Ato Kwamena Onoma described the Simba rebellion as broadly "Lumumbist" in nature, and "Lumumbist" nationalist ideas featured prominently in the eastern rebel rhetoric. In his first speech after the capture of Stanleyville, Soumialot outright stated that his forces did not fight those who had "a privileged social position they have won through many sacrifices"; instead, he identified the "counter-revolutionaries" who had "betrayed the cause for which Lumumba died" as enemies.
