= CIA activities in the Democratic Republic of the Congo =

The Congo, short for the Democratic Republic of the Congo, is an equatorial country located in central Africa. As of July 2018, the CIA World Factbook lists the Congo containing over 85 million inhabitants representing over 200 African ethnic groups. French is the country's official language, and Catholics comprise the largest religious group at fifty percent. The Congo was colonized by King Leopold II of Belgium in 1885, and known as Belgian Congo until it gained independence. Both the Soviet Union and United States had kept a close watch on the mineral-rich country until on June 30, 1960, the Congo finally gained independence under the democratically elected Prime Minister Patrice Lumumba. Lumumba was a charismatic nationalist who led the only party in parliament with a nationwide base, rather than a regional or ethnic base.

Before the independence of the Congo, the U.S. government attempted to facilitate the election of a pro-western government by identifying and supporting individual pro-U.S. leaders.

After independence, the Central Intelligence Agency plotted to assassinate Lumumba by poisoning him, but the plan was not carried out. Lumumba was eventually killed on January 17, 1961, at the age of thirty-five near Élisabethville, Katanga. Scholars debate whether or not the CIA was involved in Lumumba's murder. The CIA was notably involved in a campaign against Lumumba's successor, which led to his eventual imprisonment and long exile from the Democratic Republic of the Congo. The CIA was also a vital part of the United States' efforts to aid Joseph Mobutu, who took control of the Congo in 1965 and renamed the country Zaire and himself Mobutu Sese Seko. The CIA would work heavily with Mobutu, particularly in relation to American support for the National Liberation Front of Angola and Jonas Savimbi's National Union for the Total Independence of Angola.

== 1960 ==
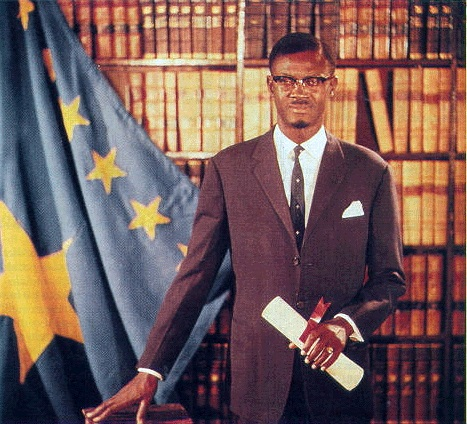
Patrice Lumumba in 1960.

The independent Republic of the Congo was declared on 30 June 1960, with Joseph Kasa-Vubu as president and Patrice Lumumba as Prime Minister. The Republic of the Congo was originally a colony of Leopold II of Belgium that was established in 1885. It shared a name with the neighboring Republic of the Congo to the west, a French colony that also gained independence in 1960; the two were differentiated by also stating the name of the relevant capital city—Congo (Léopoldville) versus Congo (Brazzaville).

From the beginning of the Congo's independence, the CIA was running operations in the country to "...stabilize the government and minimize communist influence in a strategically vital, resource-rich location in central Africa." According to a report regarding the CIA's activities in the Congo from 1960 to 1968, CIA operations "comprised activities dealing with regime change, political action, propaganda, air and marine operations, and arms interdiction, as well as support to a spectacular hostage rescue mission." During the heights of the Cold War in 1960s, Congo was regarded as strategically important to US and Western interests. This was due to its size and natural resources. The Chief of CIA Africa Division in June 1960 said, "If Congo deteriorates and Western influence fades rapidly, the bloc will have a feast and will not need to work very hard for it".

United States President Dwight D. Eisenhower was concerned at activities occurring in postcolonial Africa. During a meeting with senior advisors in August 1960 he stated that he felt Communists succeeded in convincing people worldwide that they were concerned for the common man while portraying the United States as dedicated to supporting outmoded regimes. Newly elected Prime Minister Patrice Lumumba was seen by the United States as a potential communist by Congo station chief Larry Devlin. Devlin ultimately identified him as a target for covert action. Lumumba was a nationalist and claimed neutrality in terms of the Cold War. After the rebellions of the Katanga and South Kasai provinces, Lumumba requested US military support in putting down the rebellion. The Eisenhower administration declined this request while United Nations peacekeepers were deployed in an effort to prevent a full-scale civil war. Given the UN would not help Lumumba put down the rebellion, he requested support from the Soviet Union, which provided him the Congo military with air transportation. The new relationship with the Soviets marked Lumumba as an enemy of the CIA. The UN instead intervened in the Congo, however was unfit and truly not designed for forceful military or clandestine intelligence support. A CIA report from September 1960 described Lumumba as a "demagogic speaker" who was emotionally convinced it was his duty to unify Congo through a strong central government. This report illustrated the CIA's belief that the Soviet Union was attempting to undercut the United Nations by providing Lumumba aid outside UN channels in exchange for Lumumba being the Soviet's tool. Lumumba continued to maintain that his interests were those of the Congolese majority, and described himself as a nationalist. Classified CIA cables from Leopoldville to the head of the CIA report the view of the CIA (that Lumumba was involved with Communists), as follows:

The Embassy and station believed that Congo was experiencing a takeover by the communists. The forces that were working on this were the Soviets communist party. It was difficult to determine what the key influencing factors were in order to see the struggle for power. Even though Lumumba may or may not have been playing the communists in order to gain power and with the Anti-west forces increasing their power, there wasn't enough time to try and avoid the same results as with Cuba.

Despite Lumumba's statements, Washington was unconvinced and becoming concerned that he was too close to the Soviets. If left in power, Washington feared Congo would fall into chaos and turn communist. According to a document released by the CIA, many Congolese had traveled to Belgium, in order to make contact with members of the Belgium Communist Party. Though Lumumba was not listed as one of the Congolese in Belgium, it was reported that he had accepted financial support from the Belgium Communist Party. Another CIA document identified around three hundred active Soviet personnel in the Congo. The Soviet personnel included flight crews, medical teams, truck technicians and diplomatic personnel. Based on the document, in July 1960, Lumumba was identified as speaking to a Soviet ambassador in New York and the topic of weapons was discussed. In addition, the report highlighted that two Soviet merchant ships were active in the Congo, both of which contained food and medical supplies. The report also stated that the Soviet Union offered economic aid in exchange for Congolese copper.

According to an NSC declassified briefing from July 1960, the remaining Belgian occupied bases were assisting in keeping order in the Congo. One of the most important provinces was the Katanga as it was the richest and supplied, "two-thirds of total value of Congo's mineral production-all Congo's copper (7% of world production), cobalt (60% world production), manganese, zinc, cadmium, germanium, and uranium." Belgium troops had pulled back on two bases except in Katanga. It is said that the unwillingness from the Belgian government to withdraw from their bases was in hopes that Lumumba would eventually be willing to negotiate for semi-autonomous provinces. In another declassified report, it was said that even after August 30, (Belgian troops withdrawal date) the Belgians were planning on keeping their presence in the form of "technicians."

In August 1960, to then-CIA director Allen Dulles, "We conclude that [Lumumba's] removal must be an urgent and prime objective and that under existing conditions this should be a high priority of our covert action". Dulles later rescinded his statement in 1962, admitting, "I think that we overrated the Soviet danger, let's say, in the Congo". Some scholars speculate that Allen Dulles was a "reluctant assassin", citing his hesitance to implement the mandate of President Eisenhower. Dulles seemed too reluctant, though he had just ordered the assassination plan of Fidel Castro and would go on to approve another assassination program. However, Dulles’ nebulous beliefs about the nature of Soviet influence in the Congo is discernible from several reports Dulles generated concerning communist subversion around the world. In a report from June 2, 1961, just several months after the assassination of Lumumba, Dulles emphasized the CIA's “Bloc policy” which denoted all nations pulled into the Soviet orbit. Dulles believed that the destruction of the “system of colonialism” was the first step to defeat the “Free World.” The overestimation of Soviet influence in the Congo was not solely a result of intelligence collections, but stemmed from the wider belief that all nations who were even remotely associated with the Soviet Union or China would fall to Communism. The Congo was another piece of the wall against Communism and the CIA was determined to ensure Western loyalty. In the report Dulles stated, “It requires little imagination to perceive the strategic damage to the Western position should the [Communist] Bloc obtain a major foothold on the African continent. As a small example, it is fair to say that the success of our Congo policy to date is in large measure due to the inability of the Bloc to [get supplies in and out of the Congo].” Any hesitation to assassinate leaders, like Lumumba, was overridden by a wider policy for the African subcontinent. The Congo was simply another nation that the CIA could not afford to lose in the wider game of the Cold War. As a result, hesitation in any decisions became moot once those decision went into effect.

Congo scholars and US officials expressed their doubts that Soviets were a threat to Lumumba. According to Foreign Affairs, CIA intervention was based on "an over-hyped analysis of the communist threat". According to scholars Emmanuel Gerard and Bruce Kuklick, Lumumba was portrayed as a proud nationalist and Pan-Africanist in CIA and State Department analyses, striving for neutrality in the Cold War. Agency heads as well as President Eisenhower, however, "disregarded this intelligence".

The initial plan to remove Lumumba would start with Congo's then-president, Joseph Kasavubu, to dissolve the government after a vote of no confidence from two opposition senators, subsidized by the CIA and Belgian intelligence officials. One of the senators would then replace Lumumba as the new prime minister. Attempts to remove Lumumba through street demonstrations, labor movements, and propaganda were funded by the CIA.

However, two days before the vote was to be held, Kasa-Vubu fired Lumumba, who responded with his refusal to withdraw from the government and continued domination of parliament.

Later in his term, which lasted only 10 weeks, the CIA began to orchestrate plans for Lumumba's assassination. The CIA's program was focused on removing Lumumba, but not only through the option of assassination. A declassified CIA document details how a redacted individual was instructed to assassinate Lumumba via poison. There is no evidence that the CIA ever attempted to follow through on the plan to poison Lumumba.

The CIA also supported opposition leadership through the "so-called Binza Group, a caucus of Mobutu’s political allies that got its name from the Léopoldville suburb where most of them lived. It included Mobutu’s security chief and his foreign and finance minister" plus CIA station chief Lawrence Devlin, who served as an advisor to the Binza Group. In addition (as discussed on this page below) the CIA also initiated payments to Mobutu to ensure the loyalty of legislative officers and important officers; and what were called "black" broadcasts from a radio station in Brazzaville that promoted a revolt against Lumumba.

== Assassination of Patrice Lumumba ==
Files of importance to the CIA mission to assassinate Patrice Lumumba include the 1975–76 US Senate Church Committee's investigation of CIA assassination plots against Lumumba, the report of a Belgian parliamentary inquiry in 2001, Congo Station Chief Larry Devlin's 2007 memoir, and the long-awaited appearance in 2013 of a "retrospective" Congo volume in the State Department's Foreign Relations of the United States series, which contains extensive CIA operational documents from the 1960s. Activities were done in Congo in order to control the government and try to stop the communist influence. They ended up spending around 12 million on operations, over 80 million in today's [2014] current value.

In recent years, new evidence has emerged about this grisly event and those responsible for it. A February 14, 1972, memorandum, found at the National Security Archive at George Washington University, by a writer whose name has been redacted, states, he was "directed by Mr. Richard Bissell to assume responsibility for a project involving the assassination of Patrice Lumumba." According to this report, the plan was to murder Patrice Lumumba by poisoning him.

Larry Devlin became Chief of Station in Congo in July 1960, 10 days after the country's independence from Belgium and shortly before Prime Minister Lumumba's two-month term in office, dismissal from power, and eventual bloody execution seven months after the Congo gained independence. In his memoir, Devlin reveals that late in 1960, he received instructions from an agent ("Joe from Paris"), who was relaying instructions from CIA headquarters that he (Devlin) was to effect the assassination of Lumumba. Though the CIA denies involvement in the assassination of Lumumba, documents have been released, disclosing information pertaining to the plan of trying to poison Lumumba. This poisoning was discussed as early as November 1962, according to a declassified memo by the CIA. The memo discloses that an agent, name redacted but suspected to be Devlin, had advised "Mr. Lyman Kirkpatrick that he had, at one time, been directed by Mr. Richard Bissell to assume responsibility, for a project involving the assassination of Patrice Lumumba... According to (name redacted), poison was to have been the vehicle as he made reference to having been instructed to see Dr. Sidney Gottlieb in order to procure the appropriate vehicle." The directive had come from the CIA Deputy Chief of Plans Dick Bissell, but Devlin wanted to know if it had originated at a higher level, and, if so, how high. "Joe" had been given to understand that it had come from President Dwight D. Eisenhower, but Devlin, to this day, does not know for sure. Devlin writes (and has said in public speaking engagements) that he felt an assassination would have been "morally wrong" and likely to backfire by working against U.S. interests. In any event, he decided not to act until the day Lumumba was moved to Katanga (the power hold of one of his many enemies in the country and home to a man who publicly called for his scalp).

The CIA, regardless of Devlin's hesitancy, was never able to successfully carry out one of its assassination plans. Either the plans were too difficult to implement, or, in the case of Lumumba, the CIA's attempts to kill him were superseded by the passions of Lumumba's enemies. While attempting to travel to Stanleyville, a stronghold of pro-Lumumba support, his "own popularity" plagued him, as he meant to win over the countryside he stopped for speeches, allowing his captors to draw nearer to him and his family. Lumumba was ultimately murdered by his enemies in Katanga, with Belgian government participation. U.S. intelligence was kept informed.

According to Georges Nzongola-Ntalaja, Lumumba's assassination "was a culmination of two inter-related assassination plots by American and Belgian governments, which used Congolese accomplices and a Belgian execution squad to carry out the deed." Former Belgian Chief of Police Gerard Soete admitted to assisting in Lumumba's assassination and dissolving his body in sulfuric acid, revealing Belgium's long-concealed role.

Recently declassified documents demonstrate the CIA's attempts or involvement with the assassination of Patrice Lumumba of the Congo. The CIA's chemist Dr. Sidney Gottlieb was tasked with the creating the poison to be used on Lumumba. He brought vials of the toxins with him to the Congo, handing them off to the station chief. The vials were brought to the previous station chief of Brussels, Larry Devlin. Devlin has since testified that his involvement was cut short, as he could not carry out the plan of inserting toxins into the food of Lumumba. Instead, he locked the items in his office and then buried in the banks of the Congo River.

According to recently declassified CIA documents, not everyone was on board with the plans of assassination, especially those of the works of Gottlieb. The memorandum explains that the there were concerns over the Director of Central Intelligence's involvement with the program. The CIA Science and Technology Directorate Chief, Carl Duckett was officially the one who feared involvement of the CIA, or the paper trail that could expose them. That is, they did not want the poisonous items to be connected with the CIA.

The United Nations Security Council was called into session on December 7, 1960, to consider Soviet demands that the UN seek Lumumba's immediate release, the immediate restoration of Lumumba as head of the Congo government, the disarming of the forces of Mobutu, and the immediate evacuation of Belgians from the Congo. Soviet Representative Valerian Zorin refused U.S. demands that he disqualify himself as Security Council President during the debate. Hammarskjöld, answering Soviet attacks against his Congo operations, said that if the UN forces were withdrawn from the Congo, "I fear everything will crumble."

Lumumba fled house arrest in the capital in late November 1960. Following a U.N. report that Lumumba had been mistreated by his captors, his followers threatened (on December 9, 1960) to seize all Belgians and "start cutting off the heads of some of them" unless Lumumba was released within 48 hours. On January 14, 1961, Larry Devlin was informed of Lumumba's escape from house arrest and ultimate capture by Mobutu's forces. Lumumba was to be transferred to South Kasai, whose leader was intent on murdering Lumumba. Lumumba's scheduled transfer was suddenly switched from South Kasai to Katanga, whose leader also vowed to murder him. However, Katangan soldiers and a Belgian officer executed Lumumba a few days later on 17 January. Larry Devlin's cable informing Washington of the transfer was not reached in time, as Lumumba had already been murdered. On February 7, a field report informed Washington that Lumumba and his two companions had been executed on January 17, by Katangan soldiers and a Belgian officer.

Lumumba and his two colleagues, Joseph Okito and Maurice Mpolo, were beaten and tortured on the plane en route to Katanga. When they arrived in Katanga they were greeted by both Katangese military forces and Belgium forces. The men would be kept two miles from the airport at an abandoned bungalow.In this place the beating of Okito, Mpolo, and Lumumba would continue. Tshombe and his ministers would pay a final visit to Lumumba in his bungalow prison and assault him before sending in Frans Verschauer to take the men. Frans would drive his captives 80miles to Jadotville, in the middle of the bush, and execute them.

Weeks later, Larry Devlin was noted as taking a permissive stance, despite his deep knowledge of what may happen to Lumumba. Devlin also "deliberately kept Washington out of the loop", which is noted as being an "exception" for a closely managed CIA operation such as his own. His stance is criticized as being "a major factor in the government's decision to move Lumumba". Devlin would later state, "Lumumba was a danger for both the Congo and the rest of the world" because of his perceived anti western attitudes. When asked if he was happy following the death of the leader, Devlin responded that, although happy wasn't his specific word of choice, he was certainly glad to be moving on to another project.

Others provided mixed thoughts on why Lumumba posed the threat that ultimately made Mobutu a US-sponsored leader in the Congo. Jacques Brassin, a Belgian diplomat at the time of Lumumba, and chronicler of his death, acknowledged that part of the reason the Congo's leader was resisted by outward forces was his disregard for Belgian leadership in the region. "He was dangerous for us," Brassin later said, "in the sense that he wasn't open to the kind of solutions we wanted to apply." Another Belgian and personal friend of Lumumba, Jean Van Lierde, contested that Lumumba was killed because he represented an unpredictable political nature that neither the United States nor the Belgium national government could truly identify and control. Still, others including Belgian Colonel Louis Marliere, accused Lumumba of favoring the Soviet side of the political spectrum.

Gerard and Kuklick dismiss the anti-communist rationale for Western intervention against Lumumba. The authors maintain that the governments of Belgium and the United States—including their covert operators—were largely responsible for "this traveling carnival of death." They insist that the West cannot escape accountability for the consequences of its actions by arguing that it was "the locals" who pulled the trigger. Along with their own attempts to deliver the coup de grace, US and Belgian officials more often turned to Lumumba's opponents. The Europeans and Americans goaded the Africans to imprison Lumumba and to secure a capital sentence. The politicians in Leopoldville proved willing to jail him but were afraid either to bring him to trial or put him to death. Those in Katanga (a Belgian-supported secessionist province) were not afraid, and Belgians, Americans and the Leopoldville group knew that. With Western urging, [President Joseph] Kasavubu and his cohorts sent Lumumba to Elizabethville and his doom. Regarding the US role at the end, they present a very strong circumstantial case. The United States, through the CIA, was demonstrably trying to do Lumumba in—directly and through its cooperating Congolese leaders—from August through November 1960. In January 1961, these same clients gave the station chief advance notice of their plan to ship Lumumba to his bitterest enemies, and he did nothing to discourage them.

It was speculated that the Eisenhower administration's motivations to remove Lumumba from power was influenced, in part, by the Belgian Secretary-General of NATO threatening to resign due to insufficient support by the US of the Belgian Security Council. It was also noted that the Congo Station Chief, Larry Devlin, withheld information of a plan by Congolese assets to send Lumumba to his enemies until after Lumumba had been killed. However, Devlin had actually put in a request to pay off a garrison to help restore Lumumba to power, but the State Department denied his request. Speculation as to why the information and request were handled this way was believed to have been because John F. Kennedy's incoming administration was reconsidering Eisenhower's tough stance towards Lumumba. Though "impatient" and "inexperienced", Lumumba is credited with representing Congo's best hope in a post-colonial setting. Foreign Affairs' Stephen Weissman argues that working with Lumumba would have better served both Congo and the United States. Lumumba's legacy is still felt today, in an article entitled, "Patrice Lumumba: The most Important Assassination of the 20th Century" author Georges Nzongola-Ntalaja states that, "the greatest legacy that Lumumba left for Congo is the ideal for national unity."

The exact involvement of the CIA in Lumumba's assassination is still debated by scholars and journalists. According to National Security Archive senior research fellow John Prados, the CIA was involved in several indirect ways. First, the CIA had the Congolese official that issued Lumumba's arrest warrant on their payroll. The CIA had also been providing Mobutu and his forces with large amounts of money and supplies, as he was going to be their pro-western puppet leading the nation instead of Lumumba. CIA officials were also aware of most situations as they developed, but failed to stop the actions against Lumumba. CIA officer Devlin, in fact, knew about the plan to move Lumumba to an area controlled by his sworn enemy. Devlin decided not to alert either the CIA or the US government until Lumumba was already being moved. He did this because the Kennedy Administration was about to come into power, and Eisenhower would have wanted Kennedy to decide what to do, since his term was so close to ending. So, Devlin wanted to ensure that Lumumba would die at the hands of Mobutu and the Belgians.

== Relations with Mobutu ==
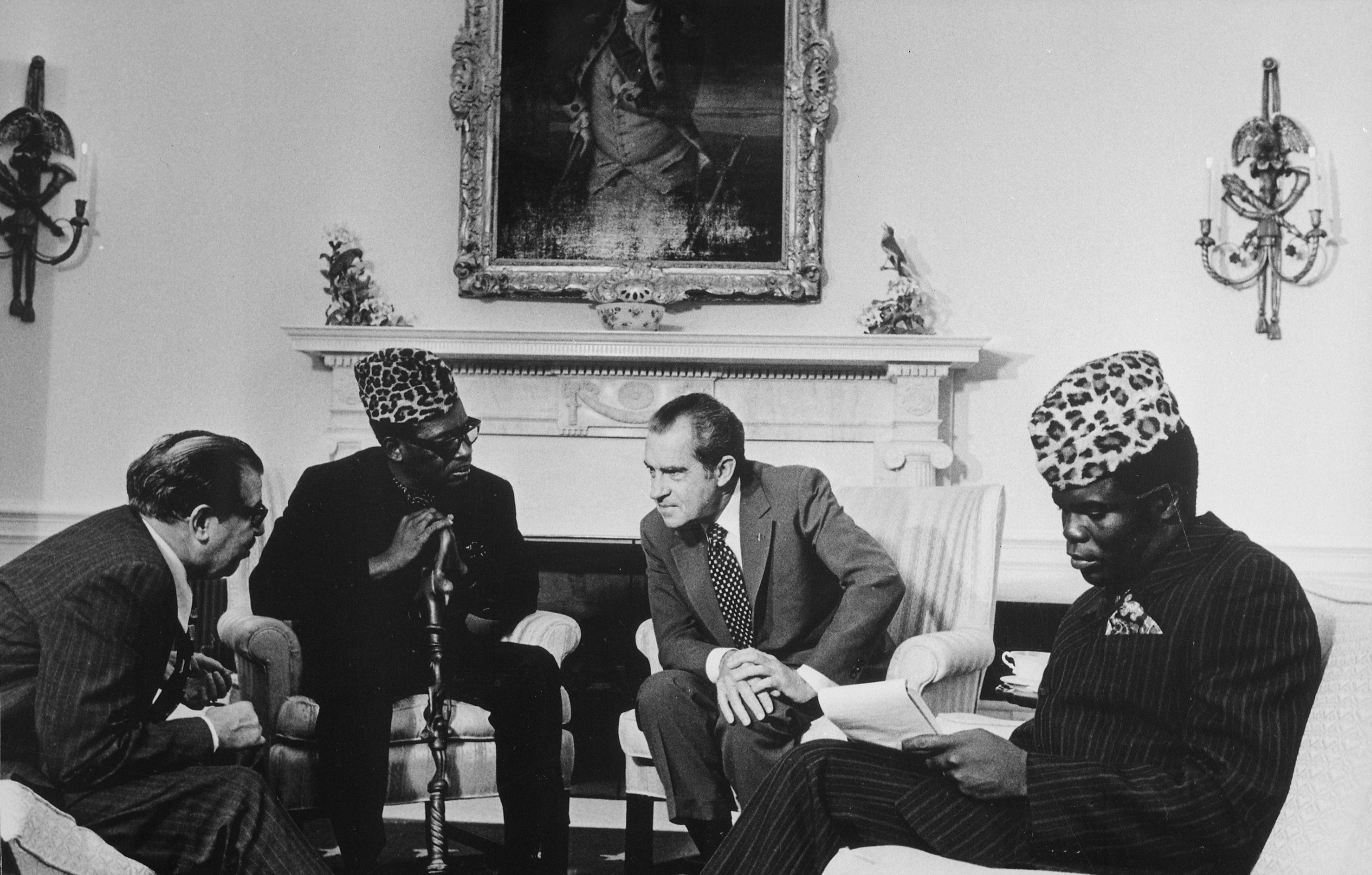
Zaire president Mobutu Sese Seko and U.S. president Richard Nixon meeting in the Oval Office in October 1973.

The United States backed Mobutu Sese Seko for over three decades. Support for Mobutu started when Lumumba was in power. Mobutu was Lumumba's chief of staff and head of the army, and continued to grow as he became a more influential leader in the Congo. Even throughout the years following Lumumba's death, the United States is credited with not only supporting Mobutu for over three decades but also with assisting in stabilizing the country during the aftermath of Lumumba's death. "The CIA's program persisted through several political crises in the Congo during 1962-63 and at least can be credited with helping the government survive them."

Then-chief of station Larry Devlin interviewed Joseph Mobutu twice. Mobutu assured Devlin that he was advancing his troops to the capital in order to remove Lumumba. In a volume of Foreign Relations of the United States recalls, "this was the beginning of the plan for Mobutu to take over the government". After the meetings, Devlin decided the best course of action to take was to offer financial support to Mobutu's troops. On September 14, 1960, Mobutu replaced Lumumba, but kept then-president Joseph Kasavubu. The CIA supported him with money, warning of assassination plots, and recommendations for ministerial appointments and ultimately counseled Mobutu to reject reconciliation with Lumumba and arrest him and his associates instead. An American National Security cable shortly after the coup described the need for a 'crash operation' to bolster Mobutu with financial and personal assistance, as well as noting an 'almost successful' assassination attempt against Mobutu. It was of key importance that Mobutu retained his control over Congo, and the CIA was determined to stop Soviet influence at any cost. This support led to Larry Devlin becoming "not just the paymaster but also an influential de facto member of the government he had helped install".

Mobutu and his political allies formed the Binza group, a primary tool used by Devlin to exert influence. Devlin was an asset to some of Mobutu's decisions, such as Mobutu's plan to fire President Kasavubu in an effort to expand his power. Devlin counseled Mobutu otherwise, recommending Mobutu work with a counsel of CIA-backed associates, and choose cabinet ministers for Kasavubu to maintain control over parliament. Devlin was also responsible for deescalating another aggressive move to attack Lumumba's UN security detail and arrest him – while Lumumba was already under house arrest at the time.

With Lumumba painted as a pro-Soviet radical, Mobutu would lead the September 14th coup against him and President Joseph Kasavubu, hoping to neutralize them and impose a ban on politics for the rest of the year. The coup was sponsored by the CIA, and would receive continued support by the CIA, including an October 27 decision by the 5412 group to release an additional $250,000 to support Mobutu. The coup resulted in Lumumba being placed under de facto house arrest, protected by UN forces. When Lumumbu grew tired of the situation, he escaped UN protection with his family and made his way to Stanleyville in the Orientale province of the Congo. He made frequent stops to help rally people to his cause (and this allowed his captors to catch up to him quickly). Lumumba never made it, he was captured by Mobutu's forces. He was savagely beaten, and he was executed on January 17, 1961.

After the death of Lumumba, the CIA's relationship with Mobutu continued to develop. Frustrated with the assent to power of Antione Gizenga, the CIA continued to support Mobutu. Mobutu worked behind the scenes of then-president Joseph Kasavubu and Prime Ministers Moise Tshombe and Cyril Adoula, helping to secure the nation's new regime with the help of the CIA. This included subsidizing and advising (bribing and buying) tribal and political leaders, fortifying relationships with labor unions and student associations, paying off parliament members and military officers, and increasing efforts to convince UN delegates of the legitimacy of the Congo's government. This support continued to grow after Mobutu visited President John F. Kennedy in the Rose Garden in 1963. This led to Mobutu receiving American financial and military support that allowed him to be in a position to assume total control of the Congo. After his 1963 visit to the White House, Mobutu was regarded as a CIA asset, and a relationship that lasted over thirty years was solidified.

In 1967, the head of the African Division (AF) expressed concerns about Mobutu's reliance on informal channels to the US Government. The African Division (AF) within the CIA is responsible for overseeing intelligence operations and analysis pertaining to African countries. Its primary role is to gather information, conduct analysis, and provide strategic insights on political, economic, and security developments across the African continent. The division works closely with various US government agencies, foreign partners, and intelligence organizations to assess regional dynamics, identify emerging threats, and support US national security interests in Africa. Mobutu had grown accustomed to this relationship, which had become somewhat essential for him. The termination of this connection, especially if it happened around the same time as Delvin's departure, could be interpreted by Mobutu as a sign that the US Government wished to withdraw from the close and friendly relations that had characterized their dealings since 1960.

Although U.S. policymakers wanted to move "away from slush funds and towards genuine development aid", when Mobutu asked for more funds in late 1968, he got it with few strings attached, because, according to the State Department, Mobutu was the ultimate source of power in Congo. They also stated how vital ready access was in order for the State Department to continue their long-standing policy of helping the Congo with unity, stability, and economic progress, as their hopes were to see a stable, western-oriented government in the heart of Africa. They did not want to risk the impairment of access to Mobutu, and that if it were to occur, it would be carried over to the contacts throughout the Congolese Government. The CIA Board of National Estimates echoed that view soon after Mobutu's departure: "If it is sudden, it will probably result in a prolonged turmoil and a sharp decline in internal security." This would also likely cause a significant loss of CIA access and influence in the Congolese government.

The CIA believed that Mobutu was the key to stability in the Congo, but was also a useful pawn for the U.S. They collected intelligence and took covert action in order to prop up his leadership against internal and external threats. For example, Congo faced the external threat from the Front for the National Liberation of the Congo (FLNC), a guerrilla force based in Angola. In a CIA memorandum from 1984, the capabilities and threats posed by the FLNC were discussed. The document mentions that, while the FLNC was ineffective, it could be rallied into a disruptive force in the future. The CIA worried that terrorist attacks carried out by the FLNC were so damaging to Mobutu's reputation that the "[election] was moved forward to July by Mobutu in an effort to shorten the time available for opposition mischief-making." Without Mobutu, the CIA believed the Congo would fall into chaos, and thus were inclined to do everything they could to keep him in power. The memorandum ends stating, "We concur with the [American] Embassy's judgement that continued control of Kinshasa is the key to Mobutu's remaining in power and that disturbances in the hinterland pose a threat to Mobutu only if sustained".

Mobutu remained a beneficiary of U.S. support throughout the Cold War despite the corruption and profligacy that were evident near the end of the Agency's covert operations. He was a reliable anticommunist ally of Washington's until his overthrow in 1997. Over the years, Mobutu proved to be an important geopolitical friend of the United States. He also turned into one of the world's worst leaders, driving the country into economic ruin and political chaos.

=== Covert operations 1960–1968 ===
In August 1960, the U.S. Government launched a covert political program in the Congo lasting almost 7 years, initially aimed at eliminating Lumumba from power and replacing him with a more moderate, pro-western leader. The United States was not comfortable with the idea of the Congo being helped by the USSR. Their fear was that the unique resources like the uranium used in the two atomic bombs used on Hiroshima and Nagasaki would be sold by Lumumba in order to boost his country's economy. The CIA operation offices knew the Congo was going to be challenging, because it had a population of 14 million, divided into over 200 ethnic groups and four major tribes, with fewer than 20 Congolese college graduates in the entire country. Their government was dependent on the former Belgian colonists to maintain infrastructure and security, which was not reliable. The CIA conducted a series of fast-paced covert action operations in the Republic of the Congo. Their operations were meant to stabilize the government and to minimize the communist influence within the country. The CIA also launched a massive PR campaign to denounce Lumumba and to promote Mobutu.

The overall program was the largest in CIA history, and it comprised activities dealing with regime change (promoting Motubu and others), political action, propaganda (denouncing Lumumba as a communist and staging mobs/riots/protests against him), air and marine operations, and arms interdiction. By the end of the operation, the CIA had spent almost $12 million to accomplish the Eisenhower, Kennedy, and Johnson's administrations' objectives to establish a pro-Western leadership in the Congo that they backed for over three decades. The special group/committee approved a budget through the years 1960–1968, broken down with $5,842,000 going to political action, $3,285,000 for air programs, and $2,575,000 for maritime actions. The Democratic Republic of the Congo became one of the US and the West's greatest allies, as a result of the large investments made by the CIA to help the country survive.

In 1962, the CIA began their air operations as a propaganda tactic to show the potential of the Congolese military to its citizens, secessionist leaders, and rebel factors. The United Nations Peacekeepers provided tactical support to Congolese forces and mercenaries fighting the insurgents. U.S. support enabled the Congolese Air Force to acquire aircraft and training crucial for maintaining security and combating insurgencies. U.S. civilian pilots provided operational support and training, contributing to the defense capabilities of the Congolese military. The Congolese Air Force had an array of aircraft and man power that they probably wouldn't have if it weren't for the United States. However, controversies arose when it was discovered that American pilots were involved in combat missions, prompting diplomatic tensions and a reassessment of U.S. involvement. The Congolese Air Force only existed because of U.S. support and assistance.

For 18 months, US pilots flew US-supplied T6 planes to support the Congolese army. In April 1964, President Johnson authorized the Department of Defense to provide the Congolese with six T-28, ten C-47, and six H-21 aircraft, plus a six-month supply of parts and ammunition. Two US civilian pilots managed the operation and training. They did some reconnaissance and combat missions in Kwilu during spring 1964. Under local pressure to join combat in Eastern Congo, the pilots flew to the region. Their support likely helped save the Kivu, a large region in Congo. When the State Department received questions about the circumstance, they answered by stating that there were no American civilian pilots flying in combat positions. The conversation with the press, before confirming the facts, was a massive misstep and resulted in some controversy. Secondly, because the information was incorrect, the State Department needed to act more quickly to correct themselves. Instead, they lagged, and the next day released information that the State now knew that some American civilians had flown combat but had violated no US laws. The press portrayed the incident as a quarrel between the State Department and the CIA. This led to an agreement between the US and Congo that there would be no more American civilian pilots flying in operational missions in the Congo.

After the fall of Lumumba in late 1960, the CIA proceeded to implement a vast variety of covert operations intent on helping to stabilize the country. However, in July 1964, Moïse Tshombe took power from Cyrille Adoula. Tshombe led a different faction than Adoula did and was in favor of pushing for individual subsidies. The United States found that its ability to influence Tshombe's decision-making was alarmingly low. After Tshombe became prime minister, the CIA decided to suspend "political action efforts while the new government established itself." DCI John McCone thought that, though the prime minister employed South African mercenaries and was a proponent for Belgian economic interests, the US should support Tshombe because "we had no choice". A declassified CIA document details the agency's perspective of the situation and future plans. The document notes the increasing size of several rebellions in the country, which were believed to have been growing in strength. The CIA gave Tshombe a 50% chance of overcoming the rebellions, although it cites his lack of military forces as a major downside. With the country in chaos, the CIA decided to send in operatives to begin laying the foundation for actions designed to liberate hostages being held by rebels in Stanleyville (modern day Kisangani).

By 1965, there was fear of growing competition between President Kasavubu and Prime Minister Tshombe. The Binza group and the US government were both fearful that one of the opponents would seek support from a radical African regime. Mobutu proposed another coup to replace both Kasavubu and Tshombe, the CIA responded by issuing its support in the form of a "carte blanche to act as he saw fit". Larry Devlin called Joseph Mobutu's successful rise to power "the best possible solution". Some argue that it is clear CIA programs in Congo "distorted Congolese politics for decades to come".

The CIA regarded Mobutu as indispensable for maintaining political stability and the development of Congo. They believed that his removal from power could lead to significant political upheaval and destruction of their security within the country. From the CIA's perspective, Mobutu's leadership provided a notion of stability in Congo. In pursuit of its own objectives, the CIA strategically supported Mobutu's rise to power, viewing him as a reliable ally who could advance American interests in the region. By backing Mobutu, the CIA aimed to establish a political foothold in the Congo. However, the agency's short-term focus on achieving its policy goals overlooked the long-term consequences of empowering a dictator. While the CIA succeeded in creating a political ally in Mobutu, their support inadvertently contributed to the consolidation of his authoritarian rule and the decline of the Congo. Mobutu's regime was marked by corruption, human rights abuses, and economic issues, which ultimately led to the country's socio-economic decline. The possibilities for democratic administration and sustainable development were jeopardized, and the difficulties faced by the Congolese people were made worse by the CIA's support of Mobutu's power.

=== Assault on Stanleyville – November 1964 ===
On the morning of November 24, 1964, a coalition of Belgian, Congolese, and US forces launched an effort to free American and European hostages from Stanleyville, along with attempting to retake the rebel-controlled town. With more than 2000 hostages being held in the area, the US paramilitary had to take action. The maneuver began with 10 American C-130 transport planes dropping a total of 600 Belgian paratroopers near the city's airfield. This part of the operation was largely successful, with only a few US planes being damaged slightly. Rebels responded to this invasion by amassing approximately 250 hostages in Lumumba Square. A CIA document detailing the events of that day state that hostages began to flee in fear of death, causing the rebels to "open fire upon them with machine guns, killing 15 to 20 and wounding 40." The document notes the hostage casualties would have been larger, but the Belgian forces arrived to combat the rebels. Sixty hostages were also taken at the Airport Hotel following the initial troop-drop, which resulted in 15 hostages being executed.

The second phase of the operation began approximately one hour after the drop, and consisted of a Congolese Army column advancing from the south. Congolese troops, along with the Belgian paratroopers, cleaned up pockets of resistance in Stanleyville and took control of the city. The operation was considered a success, with the rebels being pushed out of the town and the majority of hostages being rescued. Afterwards, authorities counted 35 dead and 80 wounded. While there were hostage casualties, the operation was considered successful because of the torture and poor treatment the hostages were experiencing, due to the anti-Western sentiments held by the rebels. Large amounts of negotiations took months for the eventual release of the hostages.

Following the fall of Stanleyville, the insurgents killed approximately 300 Americans and Europeans who were taken hostage.

In addition to providing air support for Mobutu, the CIA engaged in covert maritime activities. Rebels were smuggling Chinese-supplied weapons across Lake Tanganyika, which has an incredibly long coastline but is not overly wide, making it a difficult lake to monitor. At first, the impact was largely psychological, but later, once the CIA fleet was beefed up, the covert navy began having a serious impact. In conjunction with the air support, the covert operations managed to severely weaken the rebels.

=== Early CIA perceptions of Joseph Mobutu ===
When Congo became independent in 1960 the country was, to a large extent, an anarchist's paradise^{[according to who?]}. Between 1960 and 1965, Congo had zero political institutes, null national leaders, and a very scant number of competent individuals in its economy. Congo's independence, in 1960, was followed by a surge of military and political insurgency. Ethnic groups were butting heads with each other at that time and various uprisings took place that left behind a coagulated trail of curdled blood. However, by 1965 most of the chaos had been hampered and order subsequently managed to wiggle its way back into the state.

In November 1965, then Lieutenant General Joseph Mobutu seized power and declared himself president after throwing Kasavubu out of office.

Mobutu was able to rule for 32 years primarily due to several "sham elections as well as through brutal force". Several released CIA documents shed light on how the CIA perceived Mobutu during his rise to power and in the early years of his time in power. From these documents, it can be seen that many in the CIA were unsure of the long-term capability of Mobutu, viewing him in an "optimistically pessimistic manner". This is demonstrated in a 1966 intelligence memorandum, opening with a quote from the Belgian Foreign Minister Spaak, stating that "The Coup was the best thing that could possibly have happened; it remains to be seen whether it is also a good thing" (the coup was done in a very efficient manner and for the short term benefited the US and Belgium; but the long-term effects of the coup remained to be seen). The CIA believed Mobutu brought stability to Zaire. Mobutu created a sense of unity in an underdeveloped country. "Although he rules with an iron fist, he is not unduly cruel." The CIA cautiously approached Mobutu, unsure if he could maintain a dual role as both a political and military leader. The CIA also states in a 1966 Intelligence Memorandum that this duality is likely to cause Mobutu to move toward authoritarian rule (which he did). They also spoke favorably of his numerous civilian programs, but doubted their ability to achieve long term effectiveness.

Throughout Mobutu presidency he proved to be the finest geopolitical ally for the United States on the continent but eventually Mobutu morphed into one of the world's most vicious and corrupt kleptocrats who drove his country into economic ruin. He embezzled billions of the nation's revenue from diamonds and other precious metals/stones, and received generous gifts from the CIA and other agencies. Mobutu, like many other dictators before him, killed his own people in order to maintain his power. In 1997, Mobutu was driven out of the country by Laurent Kabila's rebel forces, and three months later died from prostate cancer in Morocco.

=== United States' relationship with Belgium ===
Having been a Belgian colony, the Congo had an important relationship with Belgium. The CIA and the American government constantly took this relationship into consideration. A report from 1964 examined the relationship from political, economic, and militaristic perspectives, noting various sources of trouble for Belgium and stability in the Congo. According to an article from The Guardian, "The US joined other world powers to force Belgium to take over this country as a regular colony." The United States was one of the only countries to recognize King Leopold II as a legitimate king of Belgium, as well as his claims to the territory in Congo. However, the king of Belgium and the aristocratic class of Belgium performed many "economic exploitations," which led to millions of fatalities in the Congo Basin. However, it benefited the United States to have support in Belgium for 126 years because of the mass natural basin of uranium in Congo. Due to the tensions involved in the Cold War, the United States and other western allies were not allowing the colonies they had to have the ability to control the natural resources, or have it be taken over by the Soviet Union.

In 1960, the relationship that the United States had with Belgium got really interesting. The Congo was a former colony of Belgium that won its independence in the same year. Patrice Lumumba became the Prime Minister of the newly formed democratic government. Soon after he was elected Prime Minister of the Congo, the military began to attack the European population that was still present in the country. Belgium, however, did not respond well to this news. Belgium sent military enforcement to reoccupy the country and attempted to aid the Congo's richest province Katanga to secede. Lumumba went directly to the United Nations for assistance, but he was repeatedly ignored. Since the US didn't do much to help him, Lumumba took matters into his own hands and went to the Soviet Union for help. The Soviet Union responded by sending planes that flew Lumumba's army into Katanga to prevent the secession. In order to stifle the spread of communism, the United States contributed aid as well.

=== Continued CIA activities in the Congo ===
During the following decades, the CIA continued to keep an eye on the Congo. By 1969, the CIA's interest in communist threats in the Congo had solidified, despite their trust in its president. A report on Soviet Policy from February of that year reflects the concerns of the CIA of Soviet interests in both Congos, Kinshasa and Brazzaville. This document gives a brief outline of past Soviet interest in the Congo and warns that while "diplomatic relations" were restored in 1967 and the Soviets have avoided much activity, the CIA did suspect them of influencing pro-communist thought in students and intellectuals in Kinshasa. In Brazzaville, the main concern of the CIA was in the potential for the government and closely related military to be sympathetic to Soviet overtures. The document also expresses concern in Moscow's special interest and approval of Congo Brazzaville's "noncapitalist" development as well as the interest of communist China in the region. The CIA's interest in maintaining a watch over the Congo developed during the 1960s, but set a precedent of interest in the region for years to come.

Another example is a document that comes from 1982, which notes the presence of a Libyan-flagged ship docked at a port in the Congo. They noted "a possible military association with sub-Saharan political entities." This document showed how the country fit into the United States' broader concerns about the region for much of the second half of the 20th century.

=== Mobutu and the Angolan Civil War ===
Once firmly established in Zaire, Mobutu also became involved in the conflict in neighboring Angola between the Marxist–Leninist MPLA, who were supported by Cuba and the Soviet Union, and the CIA-backed anti-communist forces of UNITA and the National Liberation Front of Angola. The historian George Wright alleges that the outbreak of the war occurred when the FNLA, "encouraged by Zairian President Mobutu and assisted by Zairian troops...launched an attack on the MPLA in Cazenga and Villa Alice in Luanda and in northern Angola."

Alongside the United States and Apartheid South Africa, Congolese forces were one of the key outside powers to intervene on behalf of the FNLA and UNITA. A CIA memorandum from November 1978 illustrates Mobutu's value in the conflict, especially through his support for the CIA-cultivated Jonas Savimbi and his UNITA forces. The document states that "President Mobutu has supported Savimbi in the past, allowing supplies for UNITA to be ferried through Zaire and permitting Savimbi's insurgents to maintain a few small bases in southern Ziaire. While the recent Angolan-Zairian rapprochement has lessened Mobutu's support for UNITA, it is unlikely Mobutu would block all arms shipments to UNITA via Zaire."

Another CIA memorandum, dated 7 November 1986, echoes the conclusions of the earlier document, stating that "despite his security concerns, we believe Mobutu will continue to discreetly help UNITA infiltrate into Angola and provide use of airfields, personnel, and intelligence support to facilitate the transfer of material to UNITA. Mobutu has long supported UNITA because he fears an Angolan victory would leave Zaire prey to a radical Soviet- and Cuban-supported neighbor...he believes UNITA's presence would prevent anti-Mobutu dissidents from establishing bases near the economically vital Shaba region." The document also emphasizes the importance of Western support for UNITA, noting that "Mobutu sees Western backing for UNITA as substantively and symbolically important in blunting communist inroads in the area, and, also, as an opportunity to gain additional economic and military aid for Zaire."

== See also ==
- CIA activities by country
- Congo Political Crises (1960–1965)
- Patrice Lumumba#Dismissal
- Dissolution of the Lumumba Government
- Foreign interventions by the United States
- United States involvement in regime change
