= Binza group =

The Binza group (French: groupe de Binza) was a ginger group active within the government of the Republic of the Congo (presently Democratic Republic of the Congo) in the early 1960s. Led by General Joseph-Désiré Mobutu, the clique played a major role in directing state policy, especially during the tenure of Prime Minister Cyrille Adoula, and enjoyed the covert backing of the United States government.

== Background and etymology ==
Binza was a suburb of Léopoldville that was developed after World War II as a neighborhood for upper class whites. By the 1960s the area was no longer segregated, but its expensive rents and lack of service from public transport limited its most of its Congolese residents to leading politicians and civil servants. The Binza group earned its name from this suburb, since many of its members maintained residences within it and met there. In American and Egyptian circles the group was respectively known as the Binza Boys or the Binza government.

== History ==
The Binza group was created in September 1960 and emerged as the preeminent political faction in Congolese politics in late 1961. Among its key members were Mobutu, who commanded the army; Victor Nendaka, the director of the Sûreté Nationale; Justin Marie Bomboko, a frequent foreign minister; Albert Ndele, the president of the National Bank of the Congo; and Damien Kandolo, a secretary in the Ministry of Interior. Politician Cléophas Kamitatu described it as an "association of friends of Mobutu". Ethnically and regionally diverse in membership, it exerted influence through its control of key government institutions. It enjoyed the support of the United States Central Intelligence Agency, which directed agent Larry Devlin to provide it with advice and financing. The existence of the group was not widely known until mid-1962.

The Binza Group was generally dissatisfied with Joseph Kasa-Vubu's leadership of the Congo as president and with the unruly nature of Parliament. Adoula was frequently supported by and in touch with the Binza group, but was not one of its members. He included its input in all important governmental actions.

With the possibility of national elections approaching in the near-future, in early 1963 members of the Binza group and other figures in the central government tried to organize new political parties that could win in such contests and hopefully secure their position in power. Despite significant resources and energy being devoted to these projects, these efforts largely failed to cultivate active bases of support among provincial leaders and the public. In November 1963, Conseil National de Libération (CNL) members attempted to kill Binza group leaders as part of a coup d'état attempt. The CNL militants kidnapped Mobutu and Nendaka Bika, but both managed to escape; the coup attempt was defeated. The Binza group's influence in government declined while Moïse Tshombe was prime minister, but it helped orchestrate his removal from power.

Following his assumption of power in 1965, Mobutu progressively eliminated the Binza group in favor of a personalised and authoritarian method of rule. Some of its members were appointed ambassadors and sent abroad, largely to keep them from posing a political threat to the regime. A few were later arrested and accused of subversive activities.

== Works cited ==
- De Groof, Matthias, ed. (2020). Lumumba in the Arts. Leuven: Leuven University Press. ISBN 9789462701748.
- Kisangani, Emizet Francois (2016). Historical Dictionary of the Democratic Republic of the Congo (4th ed.). Rowman & Littlefield. ISBN 9781442273160.
- LaFontaine, J.S. (2008). City Politics: A Study of Léopoldville 1962–63. American Studies (reprint ed.). Cambridge: Cambridge University Press. OCLC 237883398.
- wa Muiu, Mueni; Martin, Guy (2009). A new paradigm of the African state: fundi wa Afrika. Springer. ISBN 978-0-230-61831-2.
- Nzongola-Ntalaja, Georges (2007). The Congo, From Leopold to Kabila: A People's History (3rd ed.). New York: Palgrave. ISBN 978-1-84277-053-5.
- Young, M. Crawford (1965). Politics in the Congo: Decolonization and Independence. Princeton: Princeton University Press. OCLC 307971.
- Young, Crawford (2015). Politics in Congo: Decolonization and Independence (reprint ed.). Princeton University Press. ISBN 9781400878574.
