= Fall of Stanleyville =

1964 battle in Congo-Léopoldville

- Part of the Simba rebellion during the Congo Crisis
Date	4–6 August 1964
Location	Stanleyville, Congo-Léopoldville
Result	Simba victory
Territorial changes	Establishment of the People's Republic of the Congo (Stanleyville)

Belligerents
DR Congo; Belgium	Simba rebels

Commanders and leaders
Banza	Nicholas Olenga

Units involved
18th Commando Battalion; 16th Gendarmarie Battalion; 3rd Commando Battalion	Armée Populaire de Libération

Strength
800–1,500	50+

Casualties and losses
(Democratic Republic of the Congo) Unknown, heavy (Belgium) 1 killed	Unknown
- 1,000+ civilians killed, 1,600+ taken hostage

On 5 August 1964 left-wing Simba rebels captured the Stanleyville city (now Kisangani) from the Congolese army. The fall of the city resulting in hundreds of people being killed or taken hostage including Europeans.

== Prelude ==
On 26 July the rebels gathered at Punia where they divided into two groups, one heading towards Ponthierville, the other towards Stanleyville. Fetish priest Amisi-Makumedi distributed distributed identity cards to the fighters advancing towards Stanleyville in fifteen vehicles.

On 2 August rebels captured Waine-Rukula, advancing up to 14 km from the city of Stanleyville. A company of the 18th Commando Battalion, sent as reinforcements, abandoned its positions. Belgian officer, René Raucroix, was killed during the fighting.

== Battle ==
=== 4 August ===
On 5 August 1964 a column of sixty motor vehicles descended on Stanleyville from nearby Waine-Rukula. Several extended episodes of gunfire were reported the day before, on the city outskirts.

At around 17:30 a group of 30-40 fighters led by witch doctors waving palm leaves wearing all-white clothes passed by the American consulate while advancing in silence. A sound of gunfire was heard near the OTRACO wharves and the Protestant church. The column lost around half its fighters before retreating to the consulate. The ANC troops followed them, taking positions in the garden walls near the consulate which they used to lay fire on retreating rebels. At 18:00 gunfire cut off a rope holding the American flag at the consulate, but the flag was still flying. ANC soldiers later withdrew to the barracks. In the evening it was reported that the Ketele army camp south of the city has fallen to the rebels.

=== 5 August ===
At around 7AM ANC troops deployed around the American consulate. They fired using a recoilless rifle into an empty forest before withdrawing without a fight after an hour. At around 9AM contradictory messages came from the airport with control tower reporting fighting and Air Congo saying all was quiet. At around 11:00 Congolese army attempted to fly in Colonel Leonard Mulamba to the city but the C-47 plane was forced to turn back after being hit by anti-aircraft fire. Another army DC‐4 aircraft carrying ammunition and supplies landed at the airport just as communication with the traffic controller was lost but was forced to retreat after two armed men at the runway fired at it.

The second assault began with a group of seven or eight half-naked witch doctors waving palm leaves and chanting "Mai-Mai" (water-water, a spell meant to protect them from bullets) in unison. They were followed by a group of 50 or so young fighters, most armed only with spears, machetes, arrows and club some carrying automatic rifles looking straight ahead and repeating the chants. All fighters were naked from the waist up, some of them wearing ANC caps, cowboy hats and even women's hats. ANC soldiers initially fired at them but didn't succeed in stopping them. The rebels entered the Immoquateur neighborhood looting cars from the Belgian diplomats.

At 13:15 Simbas attacked the American consulate forcing local personnel to take cover in the communications vault. The Simba rebels attempted to tear open the steel doors but failed and, after being stuck for seven hours, the hostages managed to escape. In the evening the Simbas broadcast a radio message from the Stanleyville airport control tower: "All services at the Stanleyville airport are now functioning normally under the control of the Popular Army of Liberation. The entire city is now in rebel hands".

=== 6 August ===
Sporadic fighting was heard through the city as troops tried to retreat by the river. Gradually the rebels have spread through the city. Some soldiers were killed, some retreated by a river, while others were captured and summarily executed. In one incident the rebels fired at canoes attempting to flee the city killing several civilians. At the 8 PM the soldiers at the other side of the river fired machine guns, rifles, mortars and at least one artillery piece at the city for four hours.

== Aftermath ==
As the rebel movement spread, acts of violence and terror increased. Thousands of Congolese were executed in systematic purges by the Simbas, including government officials, political leaders of opposition parties, provincial and local police, school teachers, and others believed to have been Westernized. Many of the executions were carried out with extreme cruelty, in front of a monument to Patrice Lumumba in Stanleyville. In response, Belgium and the United States launched a military intervention on 24 November 1964. About 1,000 to 2,000 Westernized Congolese were murdered in Stanleyville alone. In contrast, the rebels initially left whites and foreigners mostly alone.

In late October 1964, nearly 1,000 European and U.S. citizens were taken hostage by rebel forces in Stanleyville.
