= Victor Nendaka Bika =

Congolese politician (1923-2002)

Director of the Sûreté Nationale of the Republic of the Congo
- In office October 1960 – 1965
- Preceded by: Christophe Muzungu
- Succeeded by: Alexandre singa Boyende Mosambayi

Minister of Interior
- In office October 1965 – November 1965
- Prime Minister: Évariste Kimba

Minister of Finance of the Democratic Republic of the Congo
- In office August 1968 – August 1969
- Preceded by: Thomas Luango
- Succeeded by: Namwisi ma Nkoy

Ambassador to the Federal Republic of Germany (West Germany)
- In office 1969–1971

Personal details
- Born: 7 August 1923 Kumu, Buta District, Orientale Province, Belgian Congo
- Died: 22 August 2002 (aged 79) Brussels, Belgium
- Party: MNC-Lumumba, MNC-Nendaka, MPR
- Spouse: Astrid Mbooto

Victor Nendaka Bika (7 August 1923 – 22 August 2002) was a Congolese politician from the Democratic Republic of Congo et du Zaïre. He was the second Director of the Congo's national security police and intelligence agency, the Sûreté Nationale. Nendaka died on 22 August 2002 while in exile in Brussels.

== Early life and family ==
Victor Nendaka was born on 7 August 1923 in Kumu, Buta Territory, Bas-Uele District in Orientale Province, Belgian Congo. He was the only child to his mother Tabapaya Elisabeth and father Angada Gabriel. However, he had stepsisters and stepbrothers, among whom were Goningame Josephine and Pae Pierre. Victor went to the Frères Maristes School in Buta. He married Astrid Mbooto in 1943. They had six children: Gabrielle, Andre, Monique, Claude, Victorine and Astrid. He died in exile on 22 August 2002 in Brussels.

== Career ==
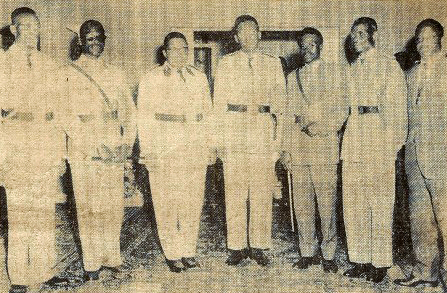
Congolese and Katangese army officers with President Kasa-Vubu in 1961. Nenkada stands at the far right.

Nendaka left the MNC-L ostensibly because Lumumba accepted a significant amount of money from communists, but he never presented any substantial evidence to support his allegation.

In October 1960 Nendaka was appointed Director of the Sûreté Nationale (national security police) by temporary commission. He swiftly reorganised the agency and transformed it into an effective intelligence-gathering service. Soon a ginger group formed in the Congolese government in support of eventual Prime Minister Cyrille Adoula known as the Binza group. Nendaka, in his capacity as Sûreté Director, was a key member.

On 13 December 1961, Minister of Interior Christophe Gbenye attempted to assert his control over the Sûreté; his cabinet released a communique stating that, effective 12 December, Nendaka no longer worked for the service and was open to reassignment in the government. Nendaka appealed to General Joseph-Désiré Mobutu for support, who immediately responded by sending troops to guard the Sûreté offices and threaten Gbenye with arrest if he interfered. Five days later an ordinance signed 15 July appeared in the official government gazette, Moniteur Congolais, declaring the nomination of Nendaka by the President of the Congo as Director of the Sûreté, effective 1 July. Nendaka thereafter reported directly to Prime Minister Adoula.

Nendaka was nearly assassinated by members of the anti-Adoula Comité National de Libération in November 1963.

He was Minister of Finance from August 1968 to August 1969.
