= Congolese National Movement =

Political party in the Democratic Republic of the Congo

Congolese National Movement Mouvement National Congolais
- President: François Lumumba (MNC-L main faction)
- Founded: October 1958; 68 years ago
- Headquarters: Kinshasa
- Ideology: Congolese nationalism; Lumumbism; Civic nationalism; African nationalism; Pan-Africanism; Left-wing nationalism; African socialism; Democratic socialism; Anti-colonialism; Faction: Cultural conservatism
- Political position: Center to left-wing
- Colours: Blue, red, yellow

Party flag

The Congolese National Movement (French: Mouvement National Congolais, MNC) is a political party in the Democratic Republic of the Congo.

== History ==
=== Foundation ===
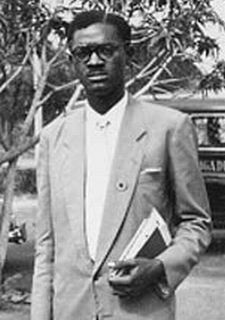
Patrice Lumumba, leader of the MNC-L faction and Congo's first Prime Minister

The MNC was founded in 1958 as an African nationalist party within the Belgian Congo. The party was a united front organization dedicated to achieving independence "within a reasonable" time and bringing together members from a variety of political backgrounds in order to achieve independence. The MNC was created around a charter which was signed by, among others Patrice Lumumba, Cyrille Adoula, and Joseph Iléo. Joseph Kasa-Vubu notably refused to sign, accusing the party of being too moderate. By the end of 1959, it claimed to have 58,000 members.

The MNC was a national party with substantial support in the whole of Congo, while most other parties were based primarily on regional or ethnic allegiances and garnered support in their respective provinces.

The MNC was the biggest nationalist party in the Belgian Congo but had many different factions within it which took different stances on several issues and was increasingly polarized between moderate évolués and the more radical mass membership. In July 1959, Iléo attempted to split the party and create a more radical party based on support of federalism rather than centralization, but his group failed to achieve mass defections from the main party.

As a result of the split, the remaining majority of the party took the name MNC-Lumumba (MNC-L) but the split also divided the MNC between the Lumumba-ists who held the Stanleyville region and its faction, which became the MNC-Kalonji (MNC-K; after Albert Kalonji who became its leader after his release from prison) which attracted support in Élisabethville (modern-day Lubumbashi) and among the Baluba ethnic groups.

Both groups competed in the Congo's first parliamentary elections in June 1960, in which Lumumba's party emerged as the largest nationalist faction in the country. Lumumba formed a coalition with the more conservative and federalist ABAKO party led by Joseph Kasa-Vubu. Lumumba was elected Prime Minister, while Kasa-Vubu became Congo's first President.

=== Independence and the Congo Crisis ===
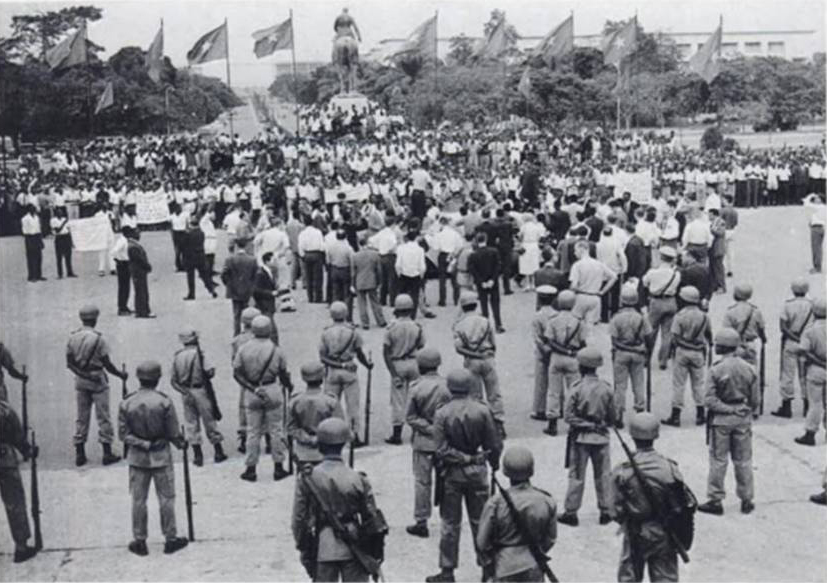
MNC-Kalonji members protest against the Lumumba Government.

However, the country quickly plunged into the Congo Crisis, facing mutinies among the soldiers and separatism in Katanga (led by Moise Tshombe) and South Kasai (led by Albert Kalonji). In September, Lumumba and Kasa-Vubu fell out and Kasa-Vubu dismissed Lumumba and instead appointed Joseph Iléo, a member of the Kalonji party as prime minister. In turn, Lumumba declared the President deposed, while Iléo failed to gain parliamentary approval. The stalemate was ended when Lumumba's aide and partisan, Colonel Joseph Mobutu arrested Lumumba, who was later transported to Katanga and killed there under dubious circumstances.

In March 1961, the MNC-L hosted a party congress in Stanleyville to replace Lumumba as party president. Christophe Gbenye was elected to lead it as head of the national committee, but leadership disputes continued to plague the party in subsequent years, with Joseph Kasongo, Charles Badjoko, Gabriel Lassiry, and Antoine Kiwewa all at times claiming to be Lumumba's rightful successor. At the conference, delegates expressed a general desire to form a larger bloc to encompass all Lumumbists in the country. Antoine Gizenga, a member of the Parti Solidaire Africain and former government colleague of Lumumba, announced in September that his party and the MNC-L were fusing as the Parti National Lumumbiste. MNC-L leaders rejected the declaration, insisting that a party congress would have to be held on a merger. Meanwhile, national political party activity outside of government steadily declined. While MNC-L persisted longer than other groupings and continued to hold some functions in early 1962, by 1963 nearly all party activity had ceased. MNC-L members continued to hold ministerial portfolios in the national government through 1963 but, due to leadership disputes, its members failed to act as a cohesive voting bloc in Parliament.

In October 1963, the MNC-L faction of Gbenye was among the political groups which agreed to form the Conseil National de Libération (CNL), a political coalition and revolutionary militant organization which subsequently organized the Simba rebellion. The MNC-L further fractured due to this event, as the party's moderates disagreed with the involvement in the CNL. In November 1965, following another fall-out between the president and prime minister, Mobutu again seized power and under regime d'exception appointed himself President. Mobutu blamed the five years of turmoil on "the politicians" and decreed: "For five years, there will be no more political party activity in the country."

=== Ban and anti-Mobutu activity ===
This meant the end of the MNC's legal activity until 1990. The party continued to operate in exile, however, where it allied with other anti-Mobutu groups. In exile, the two main MNC groups were the MNC-L and the MNCR (Mouvement National Congolais Rénové, "Reformed Congolese National Movement"). The MNC-L also continued to suffer from factionalism and splintered into further groups during this period. The MNC-L main faction came under the leadership of François Lumumba, Patrice Lumumba's son. The different MNC groups organized a militant resistance in the Congo (renamed "Zaire" by Mobutu). The MNC-L set up an armed wing called "Lumumba Patriotic Army" (Armíe Patriotique Lumumba, APL) and formed a coalition with the Front for the Liberation of Congo – Patrice Lumumba (FLC-L), a militant group which waged a low-level insurgency in Zaire, in the 1980s. MNC activists claimed responsibility for the Kinshasa bombings in March 1984. In September 1985, MNC-L, MNCR, the Congolese Democratic and Socialist Party, and other opposition groups declared a provisional government in exile. However, MNCR head Paul-Roger Mokede rejected his appointment as president of this opposition government, stating that Zaire could not "afford the luxury" of a parallel regime.

In the early 1990s, an anti-Mobutu rebel group known as the National Council of Resistance for Democracy (Conseil National de Résistance pour la Démocratie, CNRD) became active. The CRND, led by André Kisase Ngandu, posed as the armed wing of the MNC-L. Researcher Thomas Turner stated that Kisase Ngandu had broken away from one of the MNC-L splinter factions before forming the CRND. A group of activists led by Pascal Tabu, Mbalo Meka, and Otoko Okitasombo founded a new MNC-L in Kinshasa in 1994; the older MNC-L main faction in exile subsequently became known as "MNC-Lumumba Originel" (MNC-LO). In 1996, the leader of one MNC-L faction, Lambert Mende Omalanga, (Note: According to Third World Network, Lambert Mende Omalanga was the head of MNC-LO in 1996. However, François Lumumba had served one of the leaders of this exiled faction during the 1980s, and was still head of the MNC-L main faction in the 1990s. According to Congoline, Lambert Mende Omalanga was the leader of the Mouvement National de la Convention Lumumba Originel (MNCLO).) voiced his support for Kisase Ngandu and Laurent-Désiré Kabila. The two had become the leaders of the Alliance of Democratic Forces for the Liberation of Congo (AFDL) rebel coalition, fighting in the First Congo War to topple Mobutu.

Following the fall of Mobutu's regime in 1997, MNC factions began to participate in regular national politics. One MNC-L faction led by Patrice Lumumba's cousin, Albert Onawelho Lumumba, was very critical of the rule of Laurent-Désiré Kabila who had taken power as President. In contrast, Patrice Lumumba's daughter, Julienne Lumumba, became part of Kabila's government. Lumumba's heritage is also claimed by the Unified Lumumbist Party (PALU) led by Lumumba's former deputy, Antoine Gizenga, the former Prime Minister. In 2022, the remains of Patrice Lumumba were repatriated to the DR Congo. MNC-L main faction leader François Lumumba used the opportunity to express his hope that his father's nationalist spirit would help the Congolese to defend their country from enemies, considering the then-ongoing M23 offensive.

== Known factions of the MNC ==
- Mouvement National Congolais-Lumumba (MNC-L) (from 1959)
  - Gbenye faction of the MNC-L (c. 1963)
  - Kasonga-Lassiry faction of the MNC-L (c. 1963)
  - Conseil National de Résistance pour la Démocratie (CNRD) (from c. 1990)
  - "Mouvement National Congolais-Lumumba Originel" (MNC-LO) (core of the exiled faction; known under this name from 1994)
  - "New" Mouvement National Congolais-Lumumba (from 1994)
  - Mouvement National de la Convention Lumumba Originel (MNCLO)
- Mouvement National Congolais-Kalonji (MNC-K) (from 1959)
- Mouvement National Congolais Rénové (MNCR) (from c. 1960s)

== Notable members ==
- Cyrille Adoula
- Joseph Iléo
- Albert Kalonji
- Joseph Kasongo
- François Lumumba
- Patrice Lumumba
- Joseph-Désiré Mobutu
- Maurice Mpolo
- Joseph Okito
- Alphonse Songolo
