= People's Republic of the Congo (Stanleyville) =

Breakaway state in Africa

People's Republic of the Congo République populaire du Congo
- 1964–1966
- Flag Coat of arms

- Status: Unrecognized state
- Capital and largest city: Stanleyville
- Demonym: Congolese
- Government: One-party socialist republic
- President
  - 1964–1966: Christophe Gbenye
- Historical era: Cold War
  - Declaration of independence: 5 September 1964
  - Fall of Stanleyville: 24 November 1964
  - Disestablished: 1966
Preceded by	Succeeded by
Republic of the Congo (Léopoldville)	Maquis of Fizi; Mai-Mai Simba

The People's Republic of the Congo was a short-lived rival government proclaimed by the Simba rebels in the city of Stanleyville (now Kisangani) during the Simba rebellion.

== Independence ==
By August 1964, Simba rebels had captured Stanleyville where a 1,500-man ANC force fled leaving behind weapons and vehicles which the Simba rebels captured. The attack consisted of a charge, led by shamans, with forty Simba warriors. No shots were fired by the Simba rebels. Following the conquest of Stanleyville, the rebels proclaimed a "People's Republic of the Congo" (République populaire du Congo) while portraying the existing Congolese government as Western puppet regime.

== Aftermath ==
=== Orientale province ===
On 6 March 1966, government forces recaptured Ponthierville (modern Ubundu) which has been under rebel control since August 1964. One day later 200 rebels with Chinese made rifles were captured near Poko. On 13 April government captured Bondo and Opala in the north, followed by Bafwasende on 5 May. In June 1966 government forces entered Batama.

On 27 May 1967, while being chased by government forces general Simba leader Gaston Ngalo had killed a European nun he was holding hostage since 1964, Winnie Davies. Father Alphonse Strijbosh managed to escape, he was the last European hostage in rebel hands.

On 8 January 1969 Gaston Ngalo was captured and subsequently executed in Kisangani.

=== South Kivu ===
The remaining Simba rebels were mainly concentrated along the Pende-Mende-Wamaza-Kongolo road, where they still enjoyed substantial local support. On 14 July, this area was designated as the area for Operation South's Phase Four to contain and eliminate the last insurgents. However, this phase was never carried out due to the outbreak of the Stanleyville mutinies.

== Government ==
Ruling party: Conseil National de Libération

- Head of the state and government: Christophe Gbenye
- Minister of Foreign Affairs and Foreign Trade: Thomas Kanza
- Minister of Defense: Gaston Soumialot
- Minister of Public Works: François Sabiti
- Minister of Interior: Assumani Senghie
- Minister of Finance: Sylvain Kama
- Minister Plenipotentiary to Tanzania, Uganda, and Kenya; Secretary of State for Foreign Affairs: Laurent-Désiré Kabila
- Commander-in-Chief of the PLA: Lieutenant General Nicolas Olenga
- Military Attaché to the President: Major Kandeka
- National Security Administrator: Elonga Kaniki
- Governor of Haut-Congo Province: François Aradjabu / Alphonse Kingisi

== Media ==
The republic operated a radio station (Radio Stanleyville, later renamed Radio Uhuru). News was broadcast in the four national languages: Lingala, Kikongo, Tshiluba, and Swahili. It also had an official newspaper, "Le Martyr" (The Martyr).
