= Thomas Kanza =

Congolese politician (1933–2004)

Thomas Rudolphe Kanza
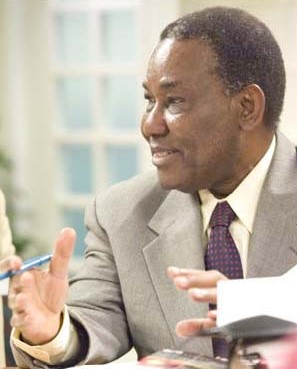

Republic of the Congo Minister-Delegate to the United Nations
- In office 24 June 1960 – 22 November 1960
- President: Joseph Kasa-Vubu
- Preceded by: position established
- Succeeded by: Justin Bomboko

People's Republic of the Congo Minister of Foreign Affairs
- In office c. 1964 – c. 1965
- President: Christophe Gbenye

Personal details
- Born: 10 October 1933 Léopoldville, Belgian Congo
- Died: 25 October 2004 (aged 71) London, United Kingdom
- Party: Conseil National de Libération (c. 1964–1965); Union Sacrée de l'Opposition (?–1993)
- Education: Université catholique de Louvain; Harvard University

Thomas Rudolphe Kanza or Nsenga Kanza (10 October 1933 – 25 October 2004) was a Congolese diplomat. He was one of the first Congolese nationals to graduate from a university. From 1960 to 1962, he served as the Democratic Republic of the Congo's (then Republic of the Congo) first ambassador to the United Nations and from 1962 to 1964, was a delegate to the United Kingdom. His opposition to the governments of Moïse Tshombe and Joseph-Désiré Mobutu led him to first rebel and ultimately flee the Congo. He returned in 1983, and resumed politics. From Mobutu's ousting in 1997 until his own death, Kanza served in diplomatic roles for the Congo.

== Early life ==
Thomas Kanza was born on 10 October 1933 in Léopoldville, Belgian Congo. He was the son of Daniel Kanza, who would emerge in the 1950s as a leader of the ABAKO party. He was the very first Congolese national to receive a college education in an area other than theology, studying at the Université catholique de Louvain from 1952 to 1956, and earning a degree in economics. Even after he graduated, he served as the vice-chairman of the Association of Congolese Students in Belgium and managed its public relations. He then spent a year at Harvard University in the United States before subsequently taking a position with the European Economic Community in Brussels. He met future prime minister Patrice Lumumba in 1955, whom he would eventually become friends with. Kanza was a member of the Union des Interets Sociaux Congolais (UNISCO), a Léopoldville-based cultural society for leaders of elite Congolese associations.

On 30 March 1957, Kanza and two of his brothers founded the weekly publication La Congo in Léopoldville, the first newspaper to be owned and managed by Congolese.

When plans for a Congolese Round Table Conference on the future of the Belgian Congo were announced in late 1959, Kanza took up a position as a liaison between the various participating parties. He also formally invited the popular Congolese bands Le Grand Kallé et l'African Jazz and OK Jazz to come perform at the talks. Following his father's break with ABAKO leadership during the conference, Kanza helped his family lead a splinter wing of the party. Kanza envisioned a post-colonial Congo as a Belgo-Congolese community up until the country became independent.

== Political career ==
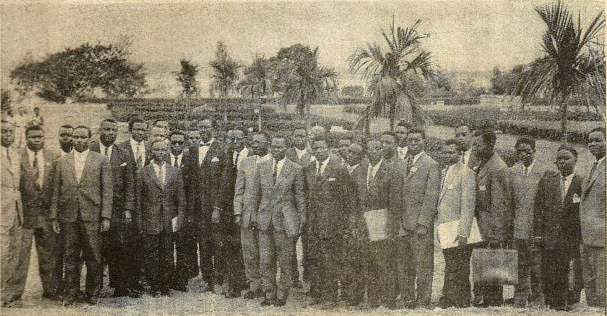
The first Congolese government. Kanza stands eighth from the right (back row, obscured).

Lumumba's party won a plurality of parliamentary seats in the Congo's first free elections. He weighed his options for the Minister of Foreign Affairs between Kanza, André Mandi, and Justin Bomboko. He mistrusted Bomboko, whom the Belgians supported and with whom he had political differences. Kanza, who was well acquainted with Bomboko, suggested that he himself be made Delegate to the United Nations (UN) with ministerial status, so he could operate with autonomy, while Bomboko should receive charge of Foreign Affairs, because he was an elected deputy and had more political support. Lumumba eventually agreed to this proposal. The Lumumba Government was invested by Parliament on 24 June. Of the members of the ministerial cabinet, only Kanza and Bomboko had university educations. The Congo was formally granted independence on 30 June 1960 as the Republic of the Congo. In mid-September Lumumba was removed from power by Colonel Joseph Mobutu and placed under arrest. Kanza approached Soviet Premier Nikita Khrushchev and Soviet Foreign Minister Andrei Gromyko for help, but was informed that there was little they could do. He then appealed to United States President-elect John F. Kennedy through Eleanor Roosevelt, asking that he intervene to protect Lumumba. Kennedy responded that the handling of prisoners was a United Nations matter. Lumumba was eventually executed on 17 January 1961.

Meanwhile, Lumumba's absence had created a dilemma surrounding the authority of his delegation at the United Nations, which was led by Kanza. On 8 November 1960, President Joseph Kasa-Vubu proposed his own delegation, leading to a dispute in the General Assembly. On 22 November 1960, the Assembly voted to recognize Kasa-Vubu's delegation, thereby subverting Kanza. He then served as the representative for Antoine Gizenga's brief rival government based in Stanleyville.

In 1962, Kanza, having rejoined the central government, was transferred to be chargé d'affaires of the United Kingdom embassy. In 1964, he was recalled to the Congo. He soon entered a dispute with the new prime minister, Moïse Tshombe, and joined the Conseil National de Libération (CNL) which was leading the Simba rebellion in the eastern Congo. He provided the CNL with his "extensive contacts in African diplomatic milieux" and his "considerable prestige" among the Congolese intellectual elites. Kanza was appointed Minister of Foreign Affairs in the CNL-led "People's Republic of the Congo", based at Stanleyville.

Following the Simba rebellion's defeat and Mobutu's definitive seizure of power in 1965, Kanza fled to Europe. He shortly thereafter moved to the United States and in the same year published a largely autobiographical novel, Sans rancune. In 1972, he published a memoir, entitled, The Rise and Fall of Patrice Lumumba: Conflict in the Congo. The book covered his own personal experiences as the Conge became independent and focused on his interactions with Lumumba. He later became a professor of politics at the University of Massachusetts Boston.

"Thomas Kanza was one of the best voices to express the continuation of adhering to an inviolate Pan-Africanist commitment and principles to struggle to develop this potential for the broad masses of indigenous people...His life can also be instructive as a benchmark to measure what we are expected to live up to."

— Elombe Brath's reflection on Kanza, 2004

Kanza returned to the Congo following the declaration of a general amnesty by Mobutu on 21 May 1983. In 1992, a "Conference Nationale Souveraine" was convened to formulate a process for democratising the Congo. Kanza took advantage of the liberalisation to reestablish his family's political base in Kongo Central. The Mobutuist factions and the opposing Union Sacrée de l'Opposition got into a dispute as to who had the right to select the next prime minister. In an attempt to undercut the opposition, Mobutu hosted a conclave in March 1993, to nominate a prime minister from among those participating. Kanza, a member of the Union Sacrée, attended the conclave but was ultimately passed over for the appointment. However, more radical members of the Union were furious about his solicitation and immediately expelled him from the organisation. In June 1997, Kanza was appointed Minister of International Cooperation in the new government of Laurent Kabila. By 1998, he was the Minister of Labour and Social Security.

Kanza died of a heart attack in London on 25 October 2004, aged 71, while serving as the Congo's ambassador to Sweden.

== See also ==
- Sophie Kanza, sister, first woman Congolese university graduate
- Marcel Lihau, brother-in-law, first Congolese law student
- Paul Panda Farnana, first Congolese to receive higher education
