= Tshombe Government =

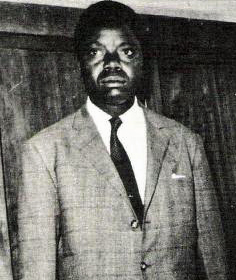
Moïse Tshombe, the leader of the government

The Tshombe Government (French: Gouvernement Tshombe) was the set of ministers that governed the Democratic Republic of the Congo under the leadership of Prime Minister Moïse Tshombe from 1964 to 1965.

== Background ==
On 6 July 1964 President Joseph Kasa-Vubu named Moïse Tshombe formateur of a new provisional government until elections could be organized as per the Luluabourg Constitution. With the exception of André Lubaya, none of the ministers had ever held a comparable office.

== Composition ==
The government initially consisted of the following persons:

=== Ministers ===
1. Prime Minister, Minister of Foreign Affairs, Minister of Information, Minister of Labour, Minister of the Post Office, and Minister of Telecommunications Moïse Tshombe (CONAKAT)
2. Minister of Interior and Public Functions Godefroid Munongo (CONAKAT)
3. Minister of Finance Dominique Ndinga (ABAKO)
4. Minister of Justice Leon Mambeleo (independent)
5. Minister of Agriculture Albert Kalonji (RADECO)
6. Minister of Economics Jean Ebosiri (CDA)
7. Minister of Transport, Minister of Communications, Minister of Public Works Jean-Leon Kidicho (Front Commun)
8. Minister of National Education Frederic Baloji (CDA)
9. Minister of Mines, Land, and Energy Adolphe Kishwe (Front Commun)
10. Minister of Youth and Sports Joseph Ndanu (PUNA)
11. Minister of Public Health André Lubaya (CNL)

== History ==
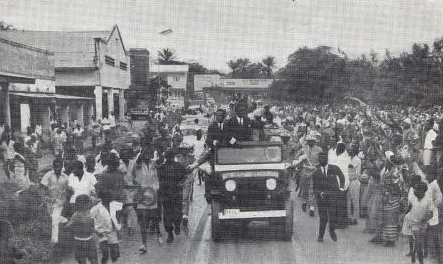
Prime Minister Tshombe touring Stanleyville in 1964

As prime minister, Tshombe briefly enjoyed a substantial amount of popularity among the crowds of Léopoldville. However, the positive feeling surrounding his assumption of the premiership eroded relatively quickly.
