= Cyrille Adoula =

Congolese Prime Minister from 1961 to 1964

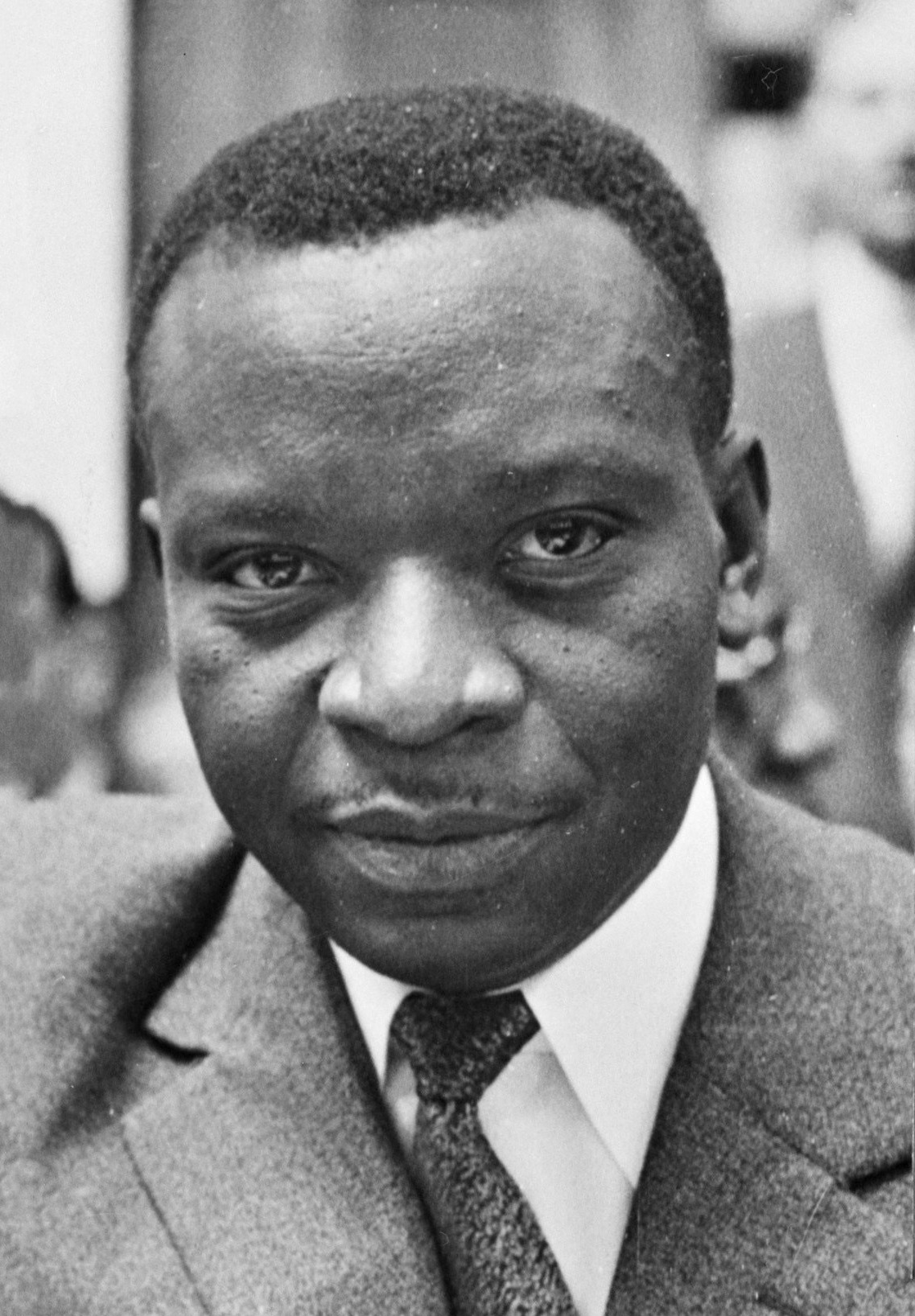
- Adoula in 1963

4th Prime Minister of Congo-Léopoldville
- In office 2 August 1961 – 30 June 1964
- President: Joseph Kasa-Vubu
- Deputy: Jason Sendwe; Antoine Gizenga; Jean Bolikango; Christophe Gbenye; Joseph Kasongo
- Preceded by: Joseph Iléo
- Succeeded by: Moise Tshombe

Personal details
- Born: 13 September 1921 Léopoldville, Belgian Congo (Now Kinshasa, Congo-Kinshasa)
- Died: 24 May 1978 (aged 56) Lausanne, Switzerland
- Party: Mouvement National Congolais (1958–1959); Mouvement National Congolais-Kalonji (1959–1964); Rassemblement des démocrates congolaise (1964)

Cyrille Adoula (13 September 1921 – 24 May 1978) was a Congolese trade unionist and politician. He was the prime minister of the Republic of the Congo, from 2 August 1961 until 30 June 1964.

== Early life and education ==
Cyrille Adoula was born to middle-class Bangala parents on 13 September 1921 in Léopoldville, Belgian Congo. He attended a Catholic primary school in his youth and received secondary education at St. Joseph's Institute, graduating after five years of studies in 1941. That year he began working as a clerk for various commercial firms. He did this until 1952 when he accepted a senior position at the Belgian Congo Central Bank, becoming the first African to hold a significant post there. In 1948, he became a member of the Conseil pour le Travail et la Prevoyance Sociale Indigene. (Note: Council for Labour and Native Social Security)

== Career ==
In 1954, Adoula joined the Belgian Socialist Party and subsequently became the representative for Action Socialiste in Léopoldville. He also enrolled in the Fédération Générale du Travail de Belgique. (Note: General Federation of Belgian Labour) Once he became one of the top Congolese delegates in the association he resigned from his bank post and devoted his time to politics. In 1957 he attended the International Labour Conference in Geneva as an adviser to the Belgian delegation. At a Fédération Générale conference in 1959 he successfully lobbied for the Congolese branch of the association to become independent, subsequently becoming secretary-general of the new federation's western chapter. In this capacity he traveled to West Germany and Israel to meet with other trade unionists and became a deputy committee member of the International Congress of Federated Trade Unions. He also cultivated a relationship with AFL–CIO unionist Irving Brown.

=== Entry into national politics, 1958-1960 ===
In October 1958 a group of Léopoldville évolués including Adoula, Patrice Lumumba, Gaston Diomi Ndongala and Joseph Iléo established the Mouvement National Congolais (MNC). Diverse in membership, the party sought to peacefully achieve Congolese independence, promote the political education of the populace, and eliminate regionalism. Adoula became party vice president. While Lumumba became increasingly strident and nationalistic, Adoula remained relatively moderate. In 1959, he and Albert Kalonji made an unsuccessful attempt to oust Lumumba from the party and formed their own faction, MNC-Kalonji.

With the independence of the Republic of the Congo in the summer of 1960, Adoula became a senator in Parliament, representing the city of Coquilhatville. Though elected by the Équateur provincial assembly with the support of Parti de l'Unité Nationale, (Note: Party of National Unity) he identified himself as an independent. (Note: According to the British Survey, Adoula was only co-opted as a senator on a PUNA ticket due to his friendship with Jean Bolikango, leader of PUNA and a popular figure among the Bangala in Équateur Province. Thomas Kanza wrote that the co-optation was achieved "with difficulty".) He requested that his membership of the International Congress of Federated Trade Unions be suspended so that he could devote his time to his new position. Nevertheless, he remained well connected with trade unions and labour organisations. In the Senate's first session on 17 June 1960, Adoula proposed a resolution which was unanimously adopted, calling for representatives of the Union of South Africa to be barred from attending the Congo's independence celebrations due to the country's Apartheid policy. Patrice Lumumba became Prime Minister and offered Adoula a ministerial position in his government but the latter refused to accept it. Adoula expressed his dissatisfaction with the ultimate composition of the government and told Lumumba that he had erred in choosing to be Prime Minister of a cabinet, which faced heavy criticism from different circles.

The Congo fell into disorder shortly after independence, as the army's mutiny and the secession of the Katanga Province under Moïse Tshombe created the Congo Crisis. Adoula increasingly distanced himself from Lumumba, but continuously lobbied that the United Nations Operation in the Congo use force to put down the rebellion in the proclaimed State of Katanga. President Joseph Kasa-Vubu dismissed Lumumba in September 1960 and appointed Iléo to be his replacement, though Parliament refused to confirm him. Adoula briefly served as Iléo's minister of interior. Lumumba was definitively removed from power and eventually killed in a coup by Colonel Joseph Mobutu, who forced a new government upon Kasa-Vubu. Adoula began attracting interest from the United States Central Intelligence Agency (CIA) as a liberal, anti-communist alternative to Lumumba.

=== As prime minister, 1961-1964 ===
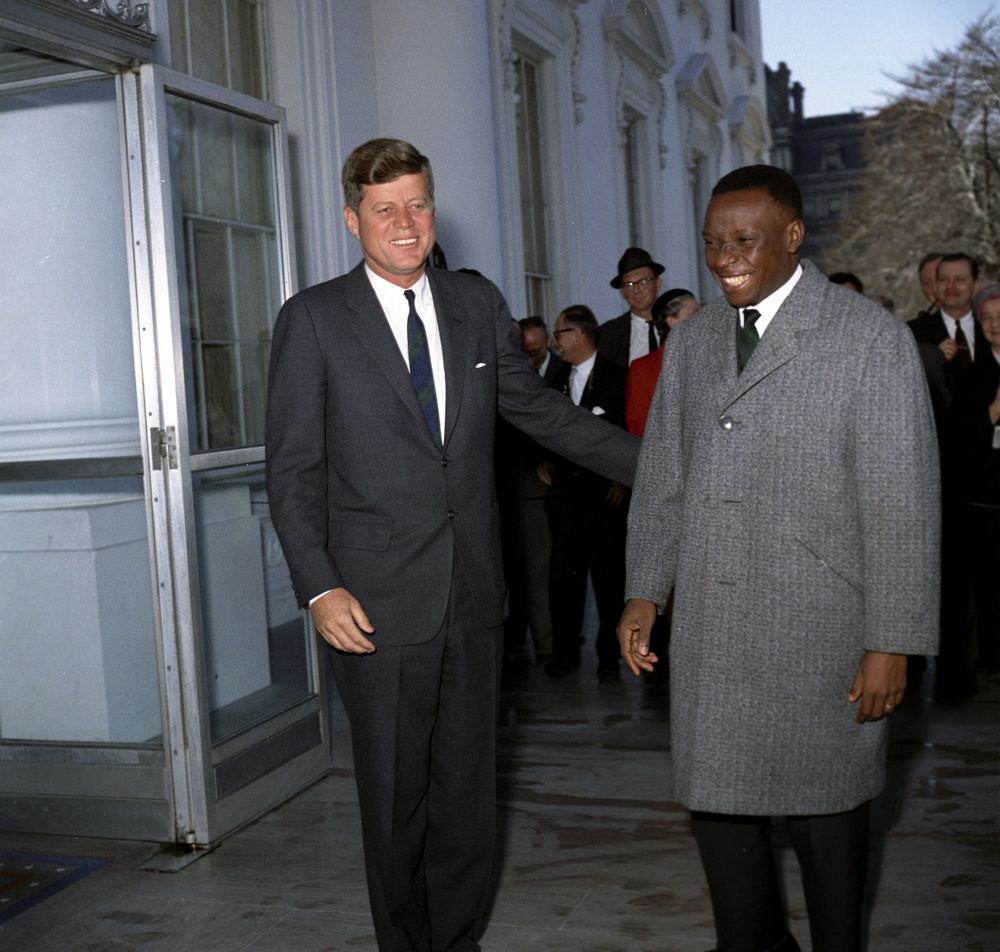
Cyrille Adoula with United States President John F. Kennedy in 1962

In early 1961, the United States began to push for an Adoula-led government. United States Secretary of State Dean Rusk directed CIA agents to ensure that Adoula would become the next Congolese prime minister. The CIA acted in concert with other Western intelligence agencies in bribing Congolese parliamentarians to support Adoula. On 1 August Adoula was appointed formateur of a new government by Kasa-Vubu. The following day he presented his government to Parliament with himself as Prime Minister. Like Lumumba had before him, Adoula also gave himself responsibility over the national defence portfolio. The government was delivered a vote of confidence in the Chamber, 121 votes to none with one abstention, and the Senate voiced its support via acclamation.

Adoula managed to balance his cabinet with many former Lumumba supporters. Antoine Gizenga became deputy prime minister. Still, as his tenure progressed, Adoula faced a growing amount of opposition from the nationalist elements of MNC-Lumumba and Gizenga's faction of the Parti Solidaire Africain. He also never garnered much popular support across the country. As 1961 drew to a close, several Lumumba sympathisers withdrew from Adoula's government and Gizenga retired to Stanleyville. Gizenga's persisting counter-government in the east represented the first major challenge to Adoula's authority. In January 1962, Adoula was able to successfully arrest Gizenga. He subsequently removed the remaining Lumumba supporters from his government, thereby excluding the largest political force in the country from power.

During his inaugural address following his investiture, Adoula had declared that his government would "take adequate measures permitting each region to administer itself according to its own profound aspirations". Legislative efforts to achieve the goal immediately began, but faced strong opposition from the Lumumbist bloc, which felt that the Katanga problem should be resolved before any discussion concerning the division of the provinces.

==== Foreign policy ====
On the international level, Adoula pursued a policy of neutrality. On 4 September 1961 he attended the 1st Summit of the Non-Aligned Movement in Belgrade that resulted in the foundation of the Non-Aligned Movement. Following the end of the Katangese secession, he in earnest attempted to develop the Congo's foreign relations, particularly with other African states in a Pan-African image. As part of this, he supported decolonisation in southern Africa.

Adoula denounced Portuguese rule in neighboring Angola, which won him favour from the Afro-Asian bloc of non-aligned states. He actively supported the Frente Nacional de Libertação de Angola (FNLA) resistance group throughout his tenure and allowed it to maintain a base in the Congo near the southern border. This was in part attributed to his longstanding personal friendship with FNLA President Holden Roberto; the two had previously been teammates for the Congolese football side Daring Club Motema Pembe. Adoula also had an interest in winning the support of Angolan refugees in Léopoldville, which grew in number after 1961. Furthermore, he hoped to undermine the Portuguese colonial authorities, which were rumored to be supporting Tshombe's efforts in mid-1963 to dislodge his administration. In November of that year his government forced one of the FNLA's chief rivals, the Movimento Popular de Libertação de Angola, to close its Léopoldville offices and drove its leadership out of the city.

Under Adoula, the Congo joined the Pan-African Freedom Movement for East and Central Africa. He agreed to supply funds to various liberation movements in southern Africa and arranged for an office building dubbed the "House of African Nationalists" to be opened in Léopoldville for their use. Despite this, the funds never proved forthcoming and the liberation movements struggled with logistics and organisation.

==== Attempted post-secession reconciliation and communist rebellion ====
Following the defeat of Katanga, Adoula organised a new "Government of Reconciliation" in April 1963.

From Gizenga's arrest in early 1962 until Parliament's adjournment in September 1963, most of the dissent Adoula faced from the left came in the form of obstructionist activities in the legislative process. In October the radical Comité National de Libération (CNL) formed in Brazzaville with the goal of overthrowing Adoula's government. By December a CNL-instigated revolt had emerged in Kwilu Province. The larger Simba rebellion of 1964 saw much of the eastern Congo overrun by leftist guerrilla forces. During the run-up to new elections in the summer, three new political coalitions in the country emerged. One of these was the Rassemblement des démocrates congolaise (RADECO), which consisted of 50 small organisations led by Jacques Massa. Centrist in ideology, it failed to amass much popular support. Adoula was elected as its president on 14 June. Still unable to contain the leftist insurrections, Adoula was forced by Kasa-Vubu to resign. He then voluntarily left the country.

== Later life, 1965-1978 ==
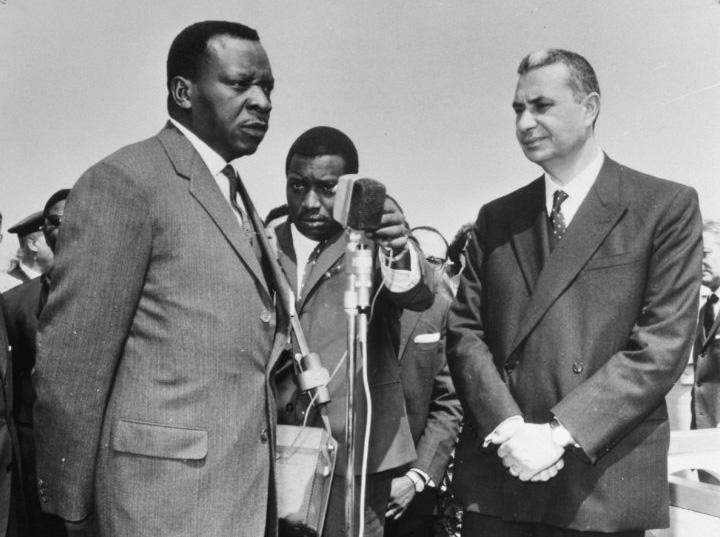
Adoula in 1964

In a New Year's message at the beginning of 1965, Prime Minister Moise Tshombe, Adoula's replacement, rejected conciliation with the rebels and called for their total defeat. Adoula dissented and put forth his own "African Plan" for the Congo in the weekly Jeune Afrique. He insisted that any long-term solution for peace and stability required input from rebel leaders, emphasizing that since their defeat would require the use of European mercenaries, acting to suppress them would only increase the Congo's reliance on external forces. He also accused Tshombe of antagonizing opposition and called for the creation of a transitional government to oversee a settlement without him. Tshombe responded by blaming the conflict on Adoula, accusing him of weakening the central government and Balkanising the country by dividing the six original provinces into 22 new ones.

In November 1965, Adoula returned to the Congo after Mobutu had seized power. He was accommodating of Mobutu's new regime and served as the Congolese Ambassador to the United States and Ambassador to Belgium. In 1969 he became Foreign Minister. He fell ill in May 1970. Mobutu took charge of the portfolio and Adoula retired from politics.

=== Personal life, beliefs and death ===
Adoula was known for his anti-clerical and socialist beliefs. He publicly advocated for a non-Marxist form of socialism and was a staunch anti-communist. In a 1957 interview with Présence Africaine he stated:

Being a Socialist, I am for the transformation of the present society into one benefiting the entire collectivity. And for this, I conceive the collectivization of the means of production and the lower echelon workers of the latter. In order to attain this goal, I only see one means: the struggle of the classes, the permanent class struggle until this result is obtained.

In 1978, Adoula suffered a heart attack and traveled to Lausanne, Switzerland, for treatment. He succumbed to his illness and died there on 24 May 1978.

Adoula's son, Antoine Pierre-Emmanuel Adoula Monga, professionally known as Doudou Adoula, was born on 23 July 1965 in Kinshasa. Doudou became a prominent figure in Congolese music. He joined the band Zaïko Langa Langa in 1988 as an atalaku (a type of hype man or lead singer) and contributed significantly to the group's success during a 35-year tenure. Doudou was known for his dynamic stage presence and was instrumental in popularizing several hits, including Ici ça va... Fungola motema and Jamais sans nous. He retired from active performance in 2023 due to health issues and died on 7 December 2024 in Brussels, Belgium, at the age of 59.

== Legacy ==
In most written histories Adoula is described as a weak, ineffective prime minister and a lackey of the United States government.

== Notes ==
Political offices
Preceded by Joseph Iléo	Prime Minister of the Democratic Republic of the Congo; 2 August 1961 – 30 June 1964	Succeeded by Moise Tshombe
