= Larry Devlin =

American intelligence agent

Lawrence Raymond Devlin (June 18, 1922 – December 6, 2008), known as Larry Devlin, was a Central Intelligence Agency (CIA) field officer. Stationed for many years in Africa, he was CIA station chief in the Democratic Republic of the Congo during the Congo Crisis.

== Biography ==
Devlin was raised in California and joined the U.S. Army during World War II, rising to the rank of captain. Devlin served for two years in North Africa, Italy and Southern France where he met his first wife, Colette Porteret, an ambulance driver with the Free French forces. He entered service with the CIA in 1949, having been recruited out of his Harvard doctoral program by McGeorge Bundy.

Devlin became chief of station in Congo in July 1960, a mere 10 days after the country's independence from Belgium and shortly before Prime Minister Patrice Lumumba's two-month term in office, dismissal from power and ultimate execution. In his memoir, Devlin reveals that late in 1960, he received instructions from an agent ("Joe from Paris") who was relaying instructions from CIA headquarters that he (Devlin) was to effect the assassination of Lumumba. Various poisons, including one secreted in a tube of toothpaste, were proffered. The directive had come from the CIA Deputy Chief of Plans Dick Bissell, but Devlin wanted to know if it had originated at a higher level and if so, how high. "Joe" had been given to understand that it had come from President Dwight D. Eisenhower, but Devlin never knew for sure. Devlin wrote (and said in public speaking engagements) that he felt an assassination would have been "morally wrong" and likely to backfire and work against U.S. interests. In the event, he temporized, neglecting to act, and Lumumba was ultimately murdered by his enemies in Katanga, allegedly with Belgian government participation and U.S. help.

Devlin supported Congolese dictator Mobutu Sese Seko in his two coups (14 September 1960 and 24 November 1965). He maintained that it was not a mistake for the U.S. to support this anti-communist, pro-Western strongman in light of larger Cold War concerns. Devlin claimed that his (CIA) support was expressed after Mobutu's September 14 coup d'état. This is contradicted, however, by evidence that CIA orchestrated Leopoldville newspaper headlines against Lumumba, organized union protests against him and mass demonstrations to remove him from power. At the time, the newly independent Congo was undergoing four secessionist movements, the strongest backed by the Belgian government and in particular the Katanga Mining Union (Union Minière du Haut Katanga) producing 70% of the Congo's wealth.

Prime Minister Lumumba sought assistance from the US and the United Nations (UN) to bring in a peace-keeping force until a settlement could be negotiated with Katanga, but the request was denied. The UN Force in the Congo at that time was only to assist in the operational function of the new government. Lumumba then threatened to seek Soviet assistance to end the Katanga secession, followed by the staunchly anti-communist General Mobutu's September 14 coup d'état, ousting Prime Minister Lumumba and President Joseph Kasa-Vubu from power. However, Mobutu allowed Kasa-Vubu to remain in power as Kasa-Vubu had never been supportive of separation from Belgium i.e. western influence.

Lumumba was placed under house arrest under UN protection, but the building was surrounded by Congolese soldiers. With his life under threat, Lumumba attempted to escape in the back of a diplomat's car hoping to reach his supporters in Stanleyville. General Mobutu's soldiers were waiting for him at a roadblock, however; they captured and turned him over to the Katangan government who tortured and executed him.

Later, Devlin served as station chief in Laos, where he led the secret war against communist guerillas, the Pathet Lao. Then he was chief, Africa Division. He retired from service with the CIA in 1974.

Subsequent to his CIA employment, Devlin settled with his wife in the Congo and became the business agent of Maurice Tempelsman, the diamond, cobalt and uranium booker, who advised the Mobutu Government on its dealings. Devlin also socialized widely in the expatriate community of Kinshasa during the late 1970s and early 1980s. In later life, Devlin divided his time between Virginia and Provence, France.

- Devlin's book Chief of Station, Congo is his account of his firsthand experiences and observations in the Congo during the Cold War.
- Seth Greenland's satirical 1997 play Jungle Rot appears to be loosely based on Devlin's tenure in the Congo.
