= Christophe Gbenye =

Congolese politician (1927–2015)

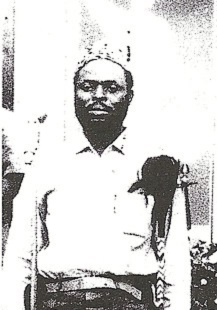

President of the People's Republic of the Congo
- In office 5 September 1964 – c. 1965

Minister of the Interior of Congo-Léopoldville
- In office 30 June 1960 – September 1960
- President: Joseph Kasa-Vubu
- Preceded by: position established
- Succeeded by: Cyrille Adoula
- In office 2 August 1961 – 13 February 1962

Vice-Prime Minister of Congo-Léopoldville
- In office February 1962 – July 1962
- President: Joseph Kasa-Vubu

Personal details
- Born: 1927 Bagbe, Bas-Uélé District, Orientale Province, Belgian Congo (now Democratic Republic of the Congo)
- Died: 3 February 2015 (aged 88)
- Party: Mouvement National Congolais; Conseil National de Libération

Christophe Gbenye (c. 1927 – 3 February 2015) was a Congolese politician, trade unionist, and rebel who, along with Gaston Soumialot, led the Simba rebellion, an anti-government insurrection in the Democratic Republic of the Congo during the Congo Crisis, between 1964 and 1965.

== Early life ==
Christophe Gbenye was born in Bagbe, Bas-Uélé District, Orientale Province in the Belgian Congo in 1927 as a member of the Mobua tribe. Relatively little is known about his early life. Gbenye received his secondary education at the Marist Brothers school in Buta. He served as a clerk for the Stanleyville municipal government's finance department and became a trade unionist. He later served as the vice president of the eastern Congo branch of the General Labour Federation of Belgium which in 1951 became the Confederation of Free Trade Unions of the Congo.

== Political and military career ==
Gbenye joined Patrice Lumumba's independence oriented Mouvement National Congolais (MNC-L) in the late 1950s, and became a prominent leader of the party by 1959. In the 1960 Belgian Congo general election, he was elected as MNC-L national deputy for Bas-Uélé. Lumumba appointed him minister of the interior in the first Congolese government in 1960 following independence. In September, President Joseph Kasa-Vubu dismissed Lumumba from his position as prime minister. Gbenye was also dismissed, and he retired to Stanleyville where he enjoyed political support. Lumumba's eventual arrest and execution in January 1961 deeply angered Gbenye. On 3 March 1961, an extraordinary assembly of the MNC-L elected Gbenye to replace Lumumba as the party president. Despite his anger over Lumumba's removal from power, he did return to his position as interior minister under Cyrille Adoula's coalition government, serving in this role from 2 August 1961 to 13 February 1962. In this role, he signed an arrest warrant for Antoine Gizenga in January 1962, significantly damaging his "radical credentials". From February to July 1962, he served as Vice-Prime Minister in the Adoula government. However, Gbenye was seen as a political liability by the United States Central Intelligence Agency, which was largely responsible for Adoula's rise to power. Adoula then dismissed Gbenye, ostensibly because of his political rivalry with Victor Nendaka Bika, though Gbenye remained in parliament through early 1962. He then briefly returned to eastern Congo, then under the control of Gizenga's rebel government.

After a visit to the United States, Gbenye was arrested on his return by Congolese security forces in October 1962, being accused of plotting secessionism in the eastern Congo. After being released on 26 November 1962, he became involved in a feud with the Kasonga-Lassiry faction in the MNC-L. In September 1963, he was made president of a new MNC-L national committee and subsequently relocated to Brazzaville in the neighbouring Republic of the Congo. On 3 October, Gbenye, Egide Bocheley-Davidson, Gaston Soumialot, and other dissidents established the revolutionary organization Conseil National de Libération (CNL). Gbenye led the CNL's more moderate faction and was opposed to the pro-Mulele CNL radicals under Egide Bocheley-Davidson. At first, he supported continued attempts to rally international "progressive" states to pressure the Léopoldville leadership into forming a new "public salvation" government, controlled by the Lumumbists in the Congolese parliament.

When peaceful efforts to oust the Adoula government failed, Gbenye ultimately led his CNL faction into an open uprising. This insurgency escalated into the Simba rebellion, as CNL-affiliated forces -dubbed "Simbas" and prominently led by commanders like Gaston Soumialot, Laurent-Désiré Kabila, Nicholas Olenga- overran much of the eastern Congo. Gbenye returned to the Congo via Bujumbura in Burundi. On 5 September 1964, Gbenye was declared President of the People's Republic of the Congo, the state established by the rebels in Stanleyville (modern Kisangani). Yet Gbenye's regime effectively collapsed when the Simba rebels were driven from Stanleyville during Operation Dragon Rouge in November 1964, though Simba groups persisted across eastern Congo and Gbenye continued to claim the presidency from exile.

In January 1965, held a meeting at Mbale with Tanzanian President Julius Nyerere, Kenyan President Jomo Kenyatta and Ugandan President Milton Obote; a meeting in Cairo with Egyptian President Gamal Abdel Nasser; and a meeting in Algiers with Algerian President Ahmed Ben Bella. In March 1965, he organized a press conference with Soumialot in Cairo, and was made a member of the "Upper Council of the Revolution" (Conseil Superier de la Revolution, CSR), the Simba high command, in April of that year. From 27 April to 4 May 1965, he was at Buta before relocating to Sudan where he called for greater unity among the infighting Simba leaders. He made more international trips over the next months, but was removed from the CSR by Soumialot in September 1965. By the end of 1965 the rebellion had been suppressed by the Congo's central government, under the tacit control of Joseph-Désiré Mobutu.

From 1966 to 1971 Gbenye lived in exile in Uganda. He returned to the Democratic Republic of the Congo after being granted amnesty in 1971.

In 2010 the then 83-year-old Gbenye was living in retirement in Kinshasa. He died on 3 February 2015.

== See also ==
- Gold Scandal (1965)
