= List of heads of state of the Democratic Republic of the Congo =

This is a list of the head of states responsible for the territory of the Congo Free State and Belgian Congo (today the Democratic Republic of the Congo).

== International Association of the Congo ==
Prior to the creation of the Congo Free State, the International Association of the Congo (IAC) had signed treaties with over 300 native Congolese chiefs and in effect exercised sovereignty over a large area of the Congo Basin. The IAC was headquartered in Belgium and run by a committee under the presidency of Maximilien Strauch. Prior to the creation of the office of Administrator-General, authority on the ground in the Congo had been exercised by a Chief of Expedition, who until April 1884 was Henry Morton Stanley.

Portrait	Name (Birth–Death)	Position	Term of office			Notes
Portrait	Name (Birth–Death)	Position	Took office	Left office	Time in office	Notes
	Francis de Winton (1835–1901)	Administrator-General	22 April 1884	1 July 1885	1 year, 70 days	

== Congo Free State ==
=== Monarch (Sovereign of the Congo Free State) ===
Portrait	Name	Position		
Portrait	Name	Position	Reign start	Reign ended
	Leopold II of Belgium (1835–1909)	Sovereign	1 July 1885	15 November 1908

=== Administrators-General / Governors-General ===
For the list of the active colonial administrators that administered the Congo Free State from 1885 to 1908, see the List of colonial governors of the Congo Free State and Belgian Congo for further information.

== Belgian Congo ==
Portrait	Name (Birth–Death)	Position	Term of office			Notes
Portrait	Name (Birth–Death)	Position	Took office	Left office	Time in office	Notes
	Théophile Wahis (1844–1921)	Governor-General	15 November 1908	20 May 1912	3 years, 187 days	
	Félix Fuchs (1858–1928)	Governor-General	20 May 1912	5 January 1916	3 years, 230 days	
	Eugène Henry (1862–1930)	Governor-General	5 January 1916	30 January 1921	5 years, 25 days	
	Maurice Lippens (1875–1956)	Governor-General	30 January 1921	24 January 1923	1 year, 359 days	
	Martin Rutten (1876–1944)	Governor-General	24 January 1923	27 December 1927	4 years, 337 days	
	Auguste Tilkens (1869–1949)	Governor-General	27 December 1927	14 September 1934	6 years, 261 days	
	Pierre Ryckmans (1891–1959)	Governor-General	14 September 1934	31 December 1946	12 years, 108 days	
	Eugène Jungers (1888–1958)	Governor-General	31 December 1946	1 January 1952	5 years, 1 day	
	Léo Pétillon (1903–1996)	Governor-General	1 January 1952	12 July 1958	6 years, 192 days	
	Hendrik Cornelis (1910–1999)	Governor-General	12 July 1958	30 June 1960	1 year, 354 days	

On 1 July 1960, the Belgian Congo became independent as the Republic of the Congo (République du Congo).

This article lists the heads of state of the Democratic Republic of the Congo (formerly Zaire) since the country's independence in 1960.

The current head of state is President Félix Tshisekedi, since 24 January 2019.

== Heads of state of the Democratic Republic of the Congo (1960–present) ==
(Dates in italics indicate de facto continuation of office)

=== Republic of the Congo (1960–1964) ===
№	Name	Birth–Death	Took office	Left office	Political Party
Presidents
1	Joseph Kasa-Vubu	1910–1969	1 July 1960	1 August 1961	ABAKO
2	Antoine Gizenga	1925–2019	1 August 1961	5 August 1961	Parti Solidaire Africain (Gizenga faction)
3	Joseph Kasa Vubu	1910–1969	5 August 1961	1 August 1964	Independent
=== Democratic Republic of the Congo (1964–1971) ===
Presidents
(3)	Joseph Kasa-Vubu	1910–1969	1 August 1964	24 November 1965 (Note: Deposed in the 1965 coup d'état.)	ABAKO
4	Joseph-Désiré Mobutu	1930–1997	24 November 1965	27 October 1971	Military / Popular Movement of the Revolution
=== Republic of Zaire (1971–1997) ===
President
(4)	Mobutu Sese Seko (Note: Previously named Joseph-Désiré Mobutu; changed name on 10 January 1972 due to the policy of Zairianisation.)	1930–1997	27 October 1971	16 May 1997 (Note: Deposed in the First Congo War.)	Popular Movement of the Revolution
=== Democratic Republic of the Congo (1997–present) ===
Presidents
5	Laurent-Désiré Kabila	1939–2001	17 May 1997	16 January 2001 (assassinated)	Independent
6	Joseph Kabila	1971–	26 January 2001; Acting since 17 January 2001	24 January 2019	Independent / People's Party for Reconstruction and Democracy
7	Félix Tshisekedi	1963–	24 January 2019	Incumbent	Union for Democracy and Social Progress

=== President of New Zaire ===
No.	Name	Portrait	Term of office		Party
1	Christian Malanga		17 May 2017	19 May 2024	United Congolese Party

== The Vice-Presidents were ==
- Azarias Ruberwa (RCD): Policy, Defense and Security Commission. He represents one of the 2 major former rebel groups.
- Arthur Z'ahidi Ngoma: Representing civil society
- Abdoulaye Yerodia Ndombasi (PPRD): Reconstruction and Development Commission. He represents the pre-peace agreement government.
- Jean-Pierre Bemba (MLC): Economic and Financial Commission. He represents one of the 2 major former rebel groups.

Under the 2006 constitution, which was promulgated in February 2006, the position of Vice-President becomes obsolete, after the inauguration of the first President of the DRC, elected democratically by direct universal suffrage. This inauguration occurred on December 6, 2006. Since then, the President of the Senate is designated to step in as interim president.

== president of the Senate ==
The president of the Senate of the Democratic Republic of the Congo is the presiding officer in the Senate of the Democratic Republic of the Congo.

Below is a list of office-holders:

Name	Entered office	Left office	Reference(s)
Joseph Iléo	June 1960	September 1960	
Victor Koumorico	July 1961	November 1962	
Isaac Kalonji	November 1962	October 1965	
Sylvestre Mudingayi	October 1965	24 June 1967	
Senate abolished	24 June 1967	7 April 2002	
Pierre Marini Bodho	7 April 2002	11 May 2007	
Léon Kengo Wa Dondo	11 May 2007	5 April 2019	
Léon Mamboleo	5 April 2019	27 July 2019	Acting
Alexis Thambwe Mwamba	27 July 2019	5 February 2021	
Léon Mamboleo	5 February 2021	1 March 2021	Acting
Modeste Bahati Lukwebo	2 March 2021	19 February 2024	
Mossaï Sanguma	20 February 2024	13 May 2024	Acting
Pascal Kinduelo Lumbu	14 May 2024	11 Aug 2024	Acting
Jean-Michel Sama Lukonde Kyenge	12 Aug 2024	Incumbent	

== List of officeholders ==
Political parties

Congolese National Movement (MNC)
Union of Mongo (UNIMO)
African Mutual Party (PSA)
Congolese National Convention (CONACO)
Confederation of Tribal Associations of Katanga (CONAKAT)
Popular Movement of the Revolution (MPR)
Union for Democracy and Social Progress (UDPS)
Democratic Assembly for the Republic (RDR)
Union of Federalists and Independent Republicans (UFIR)
Union of Independent Democrats (UID)
Unified Lumumbist Party (PALU)
People's Party for Reconstruction and Democracy (PPRD)
Future of the Congo (ACO)

Other affiliations

Military
Independent

No.	Portrait	Name (Birth–Death)	Term of office			Political party	Elected	Government	President(s) (Term)	Ref.
No.	Portrait	Name (Birth–Death)	Took office	Left office	Time in office	Political party	Elected	Government	President(s) (Term)	Ref.
Republic of the Congo / Democratic Republic of the Congo (1960–1965)
1		Patrice Lumumba (1925–1961)	24 June 1960	5 September 1960 (Dismissed)	73 days	MNC (Lumumba faction)	1960	Lumumba	Joseph Kasa-Vubu (1960–1965)	
2		Joseph Iléo (1921–1994)	5 September 1960	20 September 1960	15 days	MNC (Kalonji faction)	—	Iléo I	Joseph Kasa-Vubu (1960–1965)	
3		Albert Ndele (1930–2023)	20 September 1960	3 October 1960	13 days	Independent	—	College of Commissioners-General	Joseph Kasa-Vubu (1960–1965)	
4		Justin Bomboko (1928–2014)	3 October 1960	9 February 1961	129 days	UNIMO	—	College of Commissioners-General	Joseph Kasa-Vubu (1960–1965)	
–		Antoine Gizenga (1925–2019) (disputed) (Note: Prime Minister of the Free Republic of the Congo, in rebellion at Stanleyville, during the Congo Crisis.)	13 December 1960	5 August 1961	235 days	PSA (Gizenga faction)	—	Free Republic of the Congo	Joseph Kasa-Vubu (1960–1965)	
(2)		Joseph Iléo (1921–1994)	9 February 1961	2 August 1961	174 days	MNC (Kalonji faction)	—	Iléo II	Joseph Kasa-Vubu (1960–1965)	
5		Cyrille Adoula (1921–1978)	2 August 1961	30 June 1964	2 years, 333 days	MNC	—	Adoula	Joseph Kasa-Vubu (1960–1965)	
6		Moïse Tshombe (1919–1969)	10 July 1964	13 October 1965	1 year, 95 days	CONACO	—	Tshombe	Joseph Kasa-Vubu (1960–1965)	
7		Évariste Kimba (1926–1966)	13 October 1965	25 November 1965 (Deposed)	43 days	CONAKAT	1965	Kimba	Joseph Kasa-Vubu (1960–1965)	
Democratic Republic of the Congo / Republic of Zaire (1965–1997)
8		Léonard Mulamba (1928–1986) (Note: Chief of Staff since October 1964, until named Prime Minister after coup of 25 November 1965. Removed from premiership 26 October 1966, following pressure from army high command. Mobutu became head of government as well as head of state.(Sydney Taylor, The New Africans, 1967, p.102))	25 November 1965	26 October 1966	335 days	Military	—	Mulamba	Mobutu Sese Seko (Note: Previously named Joseph-Désiré Mobutu; changed name on 10 January 1972 due to the policy of Zairianisation.) (1965–1997)	
Post abolished (26 October 1966 – 6 July 1977)									Mobutu Sese Seko (1965–1997)	
9		Mpinga Kasenda (1937–1994)	6 July 1977	6 March 1979	1 year, 243 days	MPR	1977	Kasenda	Mobutu Sese Seko (1965–1997)	
10		Bo-Boliko Lokonga (1934–2018)	6 March 1979	27 August 1980	1 year, 174 days	MPR	—	Lokonga	Mobutu Sese Seko (1965–1997)	
11		Jean Nguza Karl-i-Bond (1938–2003)	27 August 1980	18 April 1981 (Note: Fled into exile while on a private visit to Belgium.)	234 days	MPR	—	Karl-i-Bond I	Mobutu Sese Seko (1965–1997)	
12		N'Singa Udjuu (1934–2021)	23 April 1981	5 November 1982	1 year, 196 days	MPR	1982	Udjuu	Mobutu Sese Seko (1965–1997)	
13		Léon Kengo wa Dondo (born 1935)	5 November 1982	31 October 1986	3 years, 360 days	MPR	—	Dondo I	Mobutu Sese Seko (1965–1997)	
Post vacant (31 October 1986 – 22 January 1987)									Mobutu Sese Seko (1965–1997)	
14		Mabi Mulumba (born 1941)	22 January 1987	7 March 1988	1 year, 45 days	MPR	1987	Mulumba	Mobutu Sese Seko (1965–1997)	
15		Sambwa Pida Nbagui (1940–1998)	7 March 1988	26 November 1988	264 days	MPR	—	Nbagui	Mobutu Sese Seko (1965–1997)	
(13)		Léon Kengo wa Dondo (born 1935)	26 November 1988	4 May 1990	1 year, 159 days	MPR	—	Dondo II	Mobutu Sese Seko (1965–1997)	
16		Lunda Bululu (born 1942)	4 May 1990	1 April 1991	332 days	MPR	—	Bululu	Mobutu Sese Seko (1965–1997)	
17		Mulumba Lukoji (1943–1997)	1 April 1991	29 September 1991 (Note: Resigned after the military riots in Kinshasa, during the 1991 Zaire unrest.)	181 days	MPR	—	Lukoji	Mobutu Sese Seko (1965–1997)	
18		Étienne Tshisekedi (1932–2017)	29 September 1991	1 November 1991	33 days	UDPS	—	Tshisekedi I	Mobutu Sese Seko (1965–1997)	
19		Bernardin Mungul Diaka (1933–1999)	1 November 1991	25 November 1991	24 days	RDR	—	Diaka	Mobutu Sese Seko (1965–1997)	
(11)		Jean Nguza Karl-i-Bond (1938–2003)	25 November 1991	15 August 1992	264 days	UFIR	—	Karl-i-Bond II	Mobutu Sese Seko (1965–1997)	
(18)		Étienne Tshisekedi (1932–2017)	15 August 1992	18 March 1993	215 days	UDPS	—	Tshisekedi II	Mobutu Sese Seko (1965–1997)	
20		Faustin Birindwa (1943–1999)	18 March 1993	14 January 1994	302 days	UDPS	—	Birindwa	Mobutu Sese Seko (1965–1997)	
(13)		Léon Kengo wa Dondo (born 1935)	6 July 1994	2 April 1997	2 years, 270 days	UID	—	Dondo III	Mobutu Sese Seko (1965–1997)	
(18)		Étienne Tshisekedi (1932–2017)	2 April 1997	9 April 1997	7 days	UDPS	—	Tshisekedi III	Mobutu Sese Seko (1965–1997)	
21		Likulia Bolongo (1939–2026)	9 April 1997	16 May 1997 (Deposed)	37 days	Military	—	Bolongo	Mobutu Sese Seko (1965–1997)	
Democratic Republic of the Congo (1997–present)
Post abolished (16 May 1997 – 30 December 2006)
22		Antoine Gizenga (1925–2019)	30 December 2006	10 October 2008	1 year, 285 days	PALU	2006	Gizenga I	Joseph Kabila (2001–2019)	
22		Antoine Gizenga (1925–2019)	30 December 2006	10 October 2008	1 year, 285 days	PALU	—	Gizenga II	Joseph Kabila (2001–2019)	
23		Adolphe Muzito (born 1957)	10 October 2008	6 March 2012	3 years, 148 days	PALU	—	Muzito I	Joseph Kabila (2001–2019)	
23		Adolphe Muzito (born 1957)	10 October 2008	6 March 2012	3 years, 148 days	PALU	—	Muzito II	Joseph Kabila (2001–2019)	
23		Adolphe Muzito (born 1957)	10 October 2008	6 March 2012	3 years, 148 days	PALU	2011	Muzito III	Joseph Kabila (2001–2019)	
—		Louis Alphonse Koyagialo (1947–2014); Acting	6 March 2012	18 April 2012	43 days	PALU	—		Joseph Kabila (2001–2019)	
24		Matata Ponyo Mapon (born 1964)	18 April 2012	17 November 2016	4 years, 213 days	PPRD	—	Matata I	Joseph Kabila (2001–2019)	
24		Matata Ponyo Mapon (born 1964)	18 April 2012	17 November 2016	4 years, 213 days	PPRD	—	Matata II	Joseph Kabila (2001–2019)	
25		Samy Badibanga (born 1962)	17 November 2016	18 May 2017	182 days	UDPS	—	Badibanga	Joseph Kabila (2001–2019)	
26		Bruno Tshibala (born 1956)	18 May 2017	7 September 2019	2 years, 112 days	UDPS	—	Tshibala	Joseph Kabila (2001–2019)	
26		Bruno Tshibala (born 1956)	18 May 2017	7 September 2019	2 years, 112 days	UDPS	2018	Tshibala	Félix Tshisekedi (2019–present)	
27		Sylvestre Ilunga (born 1947)	7 September 2019	27 April 2021	1 year, 232 days	PPRD	—	Ilunga	Félix Tshisekedi (2019–present)	
28		Sama Lukonde (born 1977)	27 April 2021	12 June 2024	3 years, 46 days	ACO	—	Lukonde	Félix Tshisekedi (2019–present)	
29		Judith Suminwa (born 1967)	12 June 2024	Incumbent	2 years, 156 days	UDPS	2023	Suminwa	Félix Tshisekedi (2019–present)	

== List of officeholders ==
No.	Portrait	Name (Birth–Death)	Election	Term of office			Political party	President(s) (Term)
No.	Portrait	Name (Birth–Death)	Election	Took office	Left office	Time in office	Political party	President(s) (Term)
	26	Vital Kamerhe		1955–	7 April 2019	20 May 2019	Independent	

=== Congo ===
In 1960 the State of Katanga declared independence from the Democratic Republic of the Congo. United Nations troops crushed it in Operation Grand Slam.

== See also ==
- List of prime ministers of Belgium
- List of Belgian monarchs
- Democratic Republic of the Congo
  - Politics of the Democratic Republic of the Congo
  - List of colonial governors of the Congo Free State and Belgian Congo
  - President of the Democratic Republic of the Congo
  - Prime Minister of the Democratic Republic of the Congo
    - List of heads of government of the Democratic Republic of the Congo
- Zaire
- Lists of Incumbents

== Sources ==
- Boulger, Demetrius Charles (1898). The Congo State: Or, The Growth of Civilisation in Central Africa. London: W. Thacker & Co.
- Janssens, Édouard; Cateaux, Albert (1908). Les Belges au Congo: notices biographiques. Antwerp: J. van Hille-De Backer.
