= List of prime ministers of the Democratic Republic of the Congo =

This is a list of prime ministers (Note: The office of Prime Minister was styled as Chairman of the College of Commissioners-General in 1960–1961 and as First State Commissioner in 1977–1990 (Note: After Law No. 90-002 of 5 July 1990 was promulgated, the position of "First State Commissioner" was replaced with "Prime Minister." See Articles 94–98 of the Constitution of Zaire (as amended by Law No. 90-002) for details. Source)) of the Democratic Republic of the Congo (formerly the Republic of the Congo and Zaire) since the country's independence in 1960.

The current Prime Minister is Judith Suminwa, since 12 June 2024; she is the first woman in the post.

== List of officeholders ==
Political parties

Congolese National Movement (MNC)
Union of Mongo (UNIMO)
African Mutual Party (PSA)
Congolese National Convention (CONACO)
Confederation of Tribal Associations of Katanga (CONAKAT)
Popular Movement of the Revolution (MPR)
Union for Democracy and Social Progress (UDPS)
Democratic Assembly for the Republic (RDR)
Union of Federalists and Independent Republicans (UFIR)
Union of Independent Democrats (UID)
Unified Lumumbist Party (PALU)
People's Party for Reconstruction and Democracy (PPRD)
Future of the Congo (ACO)

Other affiliations

Military
Independent

No.	Portrait	Name (Birth–Death)	Term of office			Political party	Elected	Government	President(s) (Term)	Ref.
No.	Portrait	Name (Birth–Death)	Took office	Left office	Time in office	Political party	Elected	Government	President(s) (Term)	Ref.
Republic of the Congo / Democratic Republic of the Congo (1960–1965)
1		Patrice Lumumba (1925–1961)	24 June 1960	5 September 1960 (Dismissed)	73 days	MNC (Lumumba faction)	1960	Lumumba	Joseph Kasa-Vubu (1960–1965)	
2		Joseph Iléo (1921–1994)	5 September 1960	20 September 1960	15 days	MNC (Kalonji faction)	—	Iléo I	Joseph Kasa-Vubu (1960–1965)	
3		Albert Ndele (1930–2023)	20 September 1960	3 October 1960	13 days	Independent	—	College of Commissioners-General	Joseph Kasa-Vubu (1960–1965)	
4		Justin Bomboko (1928–2014)	3 October 1960	9 February 1961	129 days	UNIMO	—	College of Commissioners-General	Joseph Kasa-Vubu (1960–1965)	
–		Antoine Gizenga (1925–2019) (disputed) (Note: Prime Minister of the Free Republic of the Congo, in rebellion at Stanleyville, during the Congo Crisis.)	13 December 1960	5 August 1961	235 days	PSA (Gizenga faction)	—	Free Republic of the Congo	Joseph Kasa-Vubu (1960–1965)	
(2)		Joseph Iléo (1921–1994)	9 February 1961	2 August 1961	174 days	MNC (Kalonji faction)	—	Iléo II	Joseph Kasa-Vubu (1960–1965)	
5		Cyrille Adoula (1921–1978)	2 August 1961	30 June 1964	2 years, 333 days	MNC	—	Adoula	Joseph Kasa-Vubu (1960–1965)	
6		Moïse Tshombe (1919–1969)	10 July 1964	13 October 1965	1 year, 95 days	CONACO	—	Tshombe	Joseph Kasa-Vubu (1960–1965)	
7		Évariste Kimba (1926–1966)	13 October 1965	25 November 1965 (Deposed)	43 days	CONAKAT	1965	Kimba	Joseph Kasa-Vubu (1960–1965)	
Democratic Republic of the Congo / Republic of Zaire (1965–1997)
8		Léonard Mulamba (1928–1986) (Note: Chief of Staff since October 1964, until named Prime Minister after coup of 25 November 1965. Removed from premiership 26 October 1966, following pressure from army high command. Mobutu became head of government as well as head of state.(Sydney Taylor, The New Africans, 1967, p.102))	25 November 1965	26 October 1966	335 days	Military	—	Mulamba	Mobutu Sese Seko (Note: Previously named Joseph-Désiré Mobutu; changed name on 10 January 1972 due to the policy of Zairianisation.) (1965–1997)	
Post abolished (26 October 1966 – 6 July 1977)									Mobutu Sese Seko (1965–1997)	
9		Mpinga Kasenda (1937–1994)	6 July 1977	6 March 1979	1 year, 243 days	MPR	1977	Kasenda	Mobutu Sese Seko (1965–1997)	
10		Bo-Boliko Lokonga (1934–2018)	6 March 1979	27 August 1980	1 year, 174 days	MPR	—	Lokonga	Mobutu Sese Seko (1965–1997)	
11		Jean Nguza Karl-i-Bond (1938–2003)	27 August 1980	18 April 1981 (Note: Fled into exile while on a private visit to Belgium.)	234 days	MPR	—	Karl-i-Bond I	Mobutu Sese Seko (1965–1997)	
12		N'Singa Udjuu (1934–2021)	23 April 1981	5 November 1982	1 year, 196 days	MPR	1982	Udjuu	Mobutu Sese Seko (1965–1997)	
13		Léon Kengo wa Dondo (born 1935)	5 November 1982	31 October 1986	3 years, 360 days	MPR	—	Dondo I	Mobutu Sese Seko (1965–1997)	
Post vacant (31 October 1986 – 22 January 1987)									Mobutu Sese Seko (1965–1997)	
14		Mabi Mulumba (born 1941)	22 January 1987	7 March 1988	1 year, 45 days	MPR	1987	Mulumba	Mobutu Sese Seko (1965–1997)	
15		Sambwa Pida Nbagui (1940–1998)	7 March 1988	26 November 1988	264 days	MPR	—	Nbagui	Mobutu Sese Seko (1965–1997)	
(13)		Léon Kengo wa Dondo (born 1935)	26 November 1988	4 May 1990	1 year, 159 days	MPR	—	Dondo II	Mobutu Sese Seko (1965–1997)	
16		Lunda Bululu (born 1942)	4 May 1990	1 April 1991	332 days	MPR	—	Bululu	Mobutu Sese Seko (1965–1997)	
17		Mulumba Lukoji (1943–1997)	1 April 1991	29 September 1991 (Note: Resigned after the military riots in Kinshasa, during the 1991 Zaire unrest.)	181 days	MPR	—	Lukoji	Mobutu Sese Seko (1965–1997)	
18		Étienne Tshisekedi (1932–2017)	29 September 1991	1 November 1991	33 days	UDPS	—	Tshisekedi I	Mobutu Sese Seko (1965–1997)	
19		Bernardin Mungul Diaka (1933–1999)	1 November 1991	25 November 1991	24 days	RDR	—	Diaka	Mobutu Sese Seko (1965–1997)	
(11)		Jean Nguza Karl-i-Bond (1938–2003)	25 November 1991	15 August 1992	264 days	UFIR	—	Karl-i-Bond II	Mobutu Sese Seko (1965–1997)	
(18)		Étienne Tshisekedi (1932–2017)	15 August 1992	18 March 1993	215 days	UDPS	—	Tshisekedi II	Mobutu Sese Seko (1965–1997)	
20		Faustin Birindwa (1943–1999)	18 March 1993	14 January 1994	302 days	UDPS	—	Birindwa	Mobutu Sese Seko (1965–1997)	
(13)		Léon Kengo wa Dondo (born 1935)	6 July 1994	2 April 1997	2 years, 270 days	UID	—	Dondo III	Mobutu Sese Seko (1965–1997)	
(18)		Étienne Tshisekedi (1932–2017)	2 April 1997	9 April 1997	7 days	UDPS	—	Tshisekedi III	Mobutu Sese Seko (1965–1997)	
21		Likulia Bolongo (1939–2026)	9 April 1997	16 May 1997 (Deposed)	37 days	Military	—	Bolongo	Mobutu Sese Seko (1965–1997)	
Democratic Republic of the Congo (1997–present)
Post abolished (16 May 1997 – 30 December 2006)
22		Antoine Gizenga (1925–2019)	30 December 2006	10 October 2008	1 year, 285 days	PALU	2006	Gizenga I	Joseph Kabila (2001–2019)	
22		Antoine Gizenga (1925–2019)	30 December 2006	10 October 2008	1 year, 285 days	PALU	—	Gizenga II	Joseph Kabila (2001–2019)	
23		Adolphe Muzito (born 1957)	10 October 2008	6 March 2012	3 years, 148 days	PALU	—	Muzito I	Joseph Kabila (2001–2019)	
23		Adolphe Muzito (born 1957)	10 October 2008	6 March 2012	3 years, 148 days	PALU	—	Muzito II	Joseph Kabila (2001–2019)	
23		Adolphe Muzito (born 1957)	10 October 2008	6 March 2012	3 years, 148 days	PALU	2011	Muzito III	Joseph Kabila (2001–2019)	
—		Louis Alphonse Koyagialo (1947–2014); Acting	6 March 2012	18 April 2012	43 days	PALU	—		Joseph Kabila (2001–2019)	
24		Matata Ponyo Mapon (born 1964)	18 April 2012	17 November 2016	4 years, 213 days	PPRD	—	Matata I	Joseph Kabila (2001–2019)	
24		Matata Ponyo Mapon (born 1964)	18 April 2012	17 November 2016	4 years, 213 days	PPRD	—	Matata II	Joseph Kabila (2001–2019)	
25		Samy Badibanga (born 1962)	17 November 2016	18 May 2017	182 days	UDPS	—	Badibanga	Joseph Kabila (2001–2019)	
26		Bruno Tshibala (born 1956)	18 May 2017	7 September 2019	2 years, 112 days	UDPS	—	Tshibala	Joseph Kabila (2001–2019)	
26		Bruno Tshibala (born 1956)	18 May 2017	7 September 2019	2 years, 112 days	UDPS	2018	Tshibala	Félix Tshisekedi (2019–present)	
27		Sylvestre Ilunga (born 1947)	7 September 2019	27 April 2021	1 year, 232 days	PPRD	—	Ilunga	Félix Tshisekedi (2019–present)	
28		Sama Lukonde (born 1977)	27 April 2021	12 June 2024	3 years, 46 days	ACO	—	Lukonde	Félix Tshisekedi (2019–present)	
29		Judith Suminwa (born 1967)	12 June 2024	Incumbent	2 years, 16 days	UDPS	2023	Suminwa	Félix Tshisekedi (2019–present)	

== See also ==
- Politics of the Democratic Republic of the Congo
- President of the Democratic Republic of the Congo
  - List of presidents of the Democratic Republic of the Congo
- Prime Minister of the Democratic Republic of the Congo
- List of colonial governors of the Congo Free State and Belgian Congo
