= List of presidents of the Democratic Republic of the Congo =

This is a list of presidents of the Democratic Republic of the Congo (formerly the Republic of the Congo and Zaire) since the country's independence in 1960.

The current president is Félix Tshisekedi, since 24 January 2019.

== List of officeholders ==
Political parties

Alliance of Bakongo (ABAKO)
Popular Movement of the Revolution (MPR)
People's Party for Reconstruction and Democracy (PPRD)
Union for Democracy and Social Progress (UDPS)

Other affiliations

Military
Independent

Symbols

^{§} Elected unopposed

Status

Denotes acting heads of state

No.	Portrait	Name (Birth–Death)	Elected	Term of office			Political party	Ref.
No.	Portrait	Name (Birth–Death)	Elected	Took office	Left office	Time in office	Political party	Ref.
Republic of the Congo / Democratic Republic of the Congo (1960–1965)
1		Joseph Kasa-Vubu (1915–1969)	1960	1 July 1960	24 November 1965 (Deposed in a coup)	5 years, 146 days	ABAKO	
Democratic Republic of the Congo / Republic of Zaire (1965–1997)
2		Mobutu Sese Seko (1930–1997) (Note: Previously named Joseph-Désiré Mobutu; changed name on 10 January 1972 due to the policy of Zairianisation.)	—	24 November 1965	16 May 1997 (Deposed in a civil war)	31 years, 173 days	Military (until 1967)	
2		Mobutu Sese Seko (1930–1997)	1970^{[§]} 1977^{[§]} 1984^{[§]}	24 November 1965	16 May 1997 (Deposed in a civil war)	31 years, 173 days	MPR	
Democratic Republic of the Congo (1997–present)
3		Laurent-Désiré Kabila (1939–2001)	—	17 May 1997	16 January 2001 (Assassinated)	3 years, 244 days	Independent member of the AFDL	
—		Joseph Kabila (born 1971)	—	17 January 2001	26 January 2001	9 days	Independent (until 2002)	
4		Joseph Kabila (born 1971)	2006; 2011	17 January 2001	24 January 2019	17 years, 363 days	PPRD	
5		Félix Tshisekedi (born 1963)	2018; 2023	24 January 2019	Incumbent	7 years, 258 days	UDPS	

== Rank by time in office ==
Rank	President	Time in office
1	Mobutu Sese Seko	31 years, 173 days
2	Joseph Kabila	18 years, 7 days
3	Félix Tshisekedi	7 years, 258 days
4	Joseph Kasa-Vubu	5 years, 146 days
5	Laurent-Désiré Kabila	3 years, 245 days

== See also ==
- Politics of the Democratic Republic of the Congo
- President of the Democratic Republic of the Congo
- Prime Minister of the Democratic Republic of the Congo
  - List of prime ministers of the Democratic Republic of the Congo
- List of colonial governors of the Congo Free State and Belgian Congo
