= Manifesto of N'sele =

1967 Congolese political manifesto

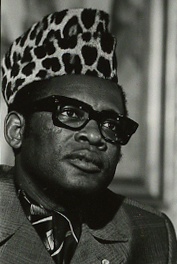
Joseph-Désiré Mobutu, pictured in 1976

The Manifesto of N'sele (French: Manifeste de la N'sele) was a political document issued in the Democratic Republic of the Congo (later renamed Zaire) on 19 or 20 May 1967 which set out the official political stance of the Popular Movement of the Revolution (Mouvement Populaire de la Révolution, MPR), a political party which had been founded by Joseph-Désiré Mobutu in 1966. The manifesto was created at an MPR meeting in N'sele, Kinshasa where it was based.

The Manifesto of N'sele defined the ideological position of the MPR as a combination of "Authenticité" and "Mobutism". It defined Mobutism as an expression of Congolese nationalism, the rejection of tribalism and regionalism, and the abstract concept of "revolution". Nationalism and the affirmation of independence was essential to the document. The Manifesto of N'sele also laid out the intentions of the government which included expansion of the national government's authority, a program committed to improving labour standards, maintaining economic independence, and the creation of an "authentic nationalism". It legitimized the creation of a one-party state in the country as an antipolitical means to end the political and ideological infighting which had characterised the Congo Crisis (1960–65).

Importantly in the context of the Cold War, the Manifesto of N'sele repudiated both communism and capitalism as not "authentic" Congolese ideologies. It called for a policy of "positive neutralism" in foreign policy.
