= Marie-Rose Kasa-Vubu Kiatazabu =

Congolese politician (1945–2026)

Member of the Legislative Council of Zaire
- In office 1977–1982

Personal details
- Born: Marie-Rose Kasa-Vubu Kukana; 27 March 1945 Léopoldville, Belgian Congo
- Died: 17 January 2026 (aged 80)
- Party: MPR; OPEKA
- Education: Henri Poincaré University
- Occupation: Secretary

Marie-Rose Kasa-Vubu Kiatazabu (née Kukana; 27 March 1945 – 17 January 2026) was a Congolese politician of the Popular Movement of the Revolution (MPR) and the Organisation politique des kasavubistes et alliés (OPEKA).

Kiatazabu was the daughter of President Joseph Kasa-Vubu and his wife, Hortense Ngoma Massunda. She attended school in Switzerland and France before her political career. She notably served in the Legislative Council of Zaire from 1977 to 1982. In 2005, she founded OPEKA, her own political party.

Kiatazabu died on 17 January 2026, at the age of 80.
