= Mobutism =

State ideology of Zaire

The flag of Zaire is a symbol of Mobutism.

Mobutism (French: Mobutisme) or Mobutuism (French: Mobutuisme) was the state ideology of Zaire (present-day Democratic Republic of the Congo) during the latter half of the 20th century, when it was under the one-party rule of the Popular Movement of the Revolution. Mobutism encompassed and glorified the thoughts, visions, and policies of Zairian president and self-proclaimed "Father of the Nation," Mobutu Sese Seko. The ideology included such major Mobutu initiatives as "Zairianization."

The Popular Movement of the Revolution (MPR) was entrenched as the single legal political party in a one-party state in Zaire. Originally Mobutu designed the constitution of Zaire to have a figurehead opposition party but later claimed that the constitution only recommended but did not demand this and thus a one-party state was created and all other political parties were banned afterwards in 1966. The ideology laid down in the Manifesto of N'sele, incorporated "nationalism," "revolution," and "authenticity." Revolution was described as a "truly national revolution, essentially pragmatic," which called for "the repudiation of both capitalism and communism" and favoured "national revolution." The Manifesto of N'sele also laid out the intentions of the government which included expansion of the national government's authority, a program committed to upgrading labour standards, having the country gain economic independence, and the creation of an "authentic nationalism" in Zaire.

Mobutu led the MPR and Zaire as an autocrat, and denounced the idea of multiple leaders and political parties in the country saying: "In our African tradition there are never two chiefs .... That is why we Congolese, in the desire to conform to the traditions of our continent, have resolved to group all the energies of the citizens of our country under the banner of a single national party."

Mobutu and the MPR were presented in propaganda as being attributed to the divine and sought to replace Christianity in Zaire with a religious devotion to Mobutu and the MPR with interior minister Engulu Baanga Mpongo once saying to supporters of the MPR: "God has sent a great prophet, our prestigious Guide Mobutu. This prophet is our liberator, our Messiah. Our Church is the MPR. Its chief is Mobutu. We respect him like one respects a Pope. Our gospel is Mobutuism. That is why the crucifixes must be replaced by the image of our Messiah."

Mobutu and the MPR pursued a national cultural revival program in Zaire called Authenticité.

Beginning in 1967 which sought to purge colonial European culture from Zaire and restore local culture, such as by forbidding Christian names and culture while promoting local African names and culture as well as forbidding western suits and creating a state-authorized uniform called the abacost.

The ideology survives today in such organizations as Nzanga Mobutu's Union of Mobutist Democrats.

== See also ==
- Lumumbism, a competing ideology based on the ideas of former prime minister Patrice Lumumba

== Bibliography ==
- Young, Crawford; Turner, Thomas Edwin (1985-09-15). The Rise and Decline of the Zairian State. University of Wisconsin Press. ISBN 978-0-299-10110-7.
