= High Council of the Republic (Zaire) =

- Coat of arms of Zaire (1971–1997)

History
- Founded: 1992
- Disbanded: 1994
- Preceded by: Legislative Council (Zaire)
- Succeeded by: High Council of the Republic

Leadership
- Prime Minister: Étienne Tshisekedi (Note: At time of abolition.)

Structure
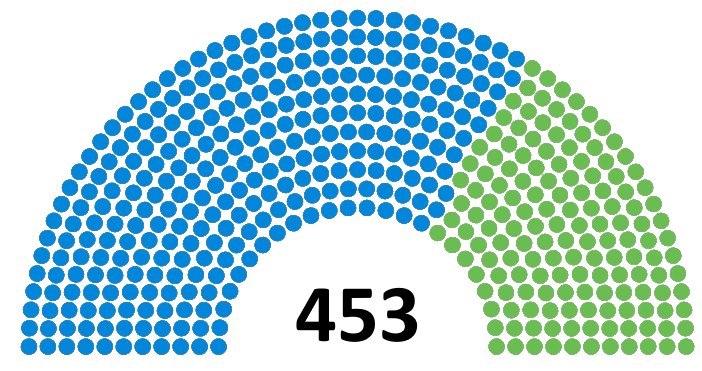
- Political groups: USORAL (302); Mobutist Faction (151) (Note: The seat count of each bloc is undocumented, but a two thirds majority was required by the Democratic Transition Act 1992, which the bloc was able to achieve.)

Elections
- Next election: N/A

The High Council of the Republic (French: Haut Conseil de la République, or HCR) was a provisional legislative body in the Republic of Zaire. Succeeding the National Legislative Council, it was established in 1992 as part of "le compromis politique global", an agreement between President Mobotu Sese Seko and the Conférence Nationale Souveraine (CNR) which aimed to transition the nation to a multiparty democracy.

== History ==
After the reformation of the Republic of the Congo into the Republic of Zaire in 1971, Mobutu Sese Soku established the National Legislative Council through the promulgation of a new constitution in 1974. The Popular Movement of the Revolution was the sole political party elected to this body, a result of Mobuto establishing it as the sole political party in Zaire in 1967.

In 1977 and 1978, Zaire's main opposition-in-exile, the Congolese National Liberation Front (Front de la Libération Nationale Congolaise; FLNC) launched two military operations into Shaba province, which, while defeated with foreign assistance from Morocco and France, exposed the vulnerabilities the regime faced.

In 1980, 13 members of the Legislative Council rebelled against Mobuto, demanding political reforms, and were met with repression. However, the movement survived and would go on to become the Union pour la Démocratie et le Progrès Social (UDPS), against laws banning opposition parties.

Eventually, in 1991, the Mobutu government was pressured to hold a national conference on constitutional reform by the UDPS and other minor opposition blocs that had formed, which resulted in the Conférence Nationale Souveraine, which opened August 7, 1991.

As part of a compromise between Mobutu, the UDPS-led coalition of opposition parties - the Sacred Union of the Radical Opposition and its Allies (Union Sacrée de l'Opposition Radicale et Alliés, USORAL) and the other constituent members of the CNS, the High Council of the Republic was established as a parliamentary body, part of a two-year plan for a democratic transition which saw Mobutu become a ceremonial president, and Etienne Tshisekedi elected Prime Minister.

In 1994, it was reorganized into the High Council of the Republic-Transitional Parliament (HCR-PT) as part of a merger with the Mobutist-controlled National Assembly, which had been operating simultaneously as a rival legislature since 1993. This body subsequently elected Léon Kengo wa Dondo as Prime Minister.

== Composition ==
The initial HCR was established with 453 members, representative of the UDPS and other opposition parties. Upon the merger with the National Assembly, it reached a seat total of 738.

== See also ==
- Zaire
- Mobutu Sese Seko
- Legislative Council (Zaire)
