= 1975 Zairean parliamentary election =

Parliamentary elections were held in Zaire on 2 November 1975. At the time, the country was a one-party state with the Popular Movement of the Revolution (MPR) as the only legally permitted party. Voters approved a single list of 244 MPR candidates. Instead of the "costly and complicated" system of casting ballots, the election took place by "acclaim"; candidates were presented at public locations such as stadiums and the audience "elected" them by cheering.

== Results ==
Of the 244 elected candidates, 217 were men and 27 were women.

Party	Seats	+/–
Popular Movement of the Revolution	244	–176
Total	244	–176
Source: IPU
