= List of heads of state of Congo =

List of heads of state of Congo may refer to:

- List of heads of state of the Democratic Republic of the Congo
- List of heads of state of the Republic of the Congo
