= Sébastien Impeto Pengo =

Governoror of Équateur province, Democratic Republic of the Congo
- President: Joseph Kabila
- Prime Minister: Augustin Matata Ponyo
- Preceded by: Louis Alphonse Koyagialo

Personal details
- Born: Democratic Republic of the Congo
- Occupation: Politician

Sébastien Impeto Pengo is a former acting governor of Équateur, which until 2015 was one of the ten provinces of the Democratic Republic of the Congo. Former governor Louis Alphonse Koyagialo was physically unable to perform his function, after which Sébastien Impeto Pengo was appointed as an acting governor by Joseph Kabila, the president of the Democratic Republic of the Congo.
