= 1987 Zairean parliamentary election =

Parliamentary elections were held in Zaire on 6 September 1987. The Popular Movement of the Revolution was the sole political party at the time, with all candidates running for election to the Legislative Council required to be party members. In total, 1,075 candidates ran for the 210 seats (reduced from 310 in the previous election).

== Results ==
Of the 210 elected candidates, 198 were men and 12 were women.

Party	Seats	+/–
Popular Movement of the Revolution	210	–100
Total	210	–100
Source: IPU
