= 1977 Zairean presidential election =

- 3 December 1977
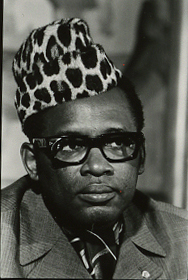
Nominee	Mobutu Sese Seko
Party	MPR
Popular vote	10,492,247
Percentage	98.12%
- Results by province Mobutu: 90–100%
President before election
Mobutu Sese Seko
MPR
Elected President
Mobutu Sese Seko
MPR

Presidential elections were held in Zaire on 3 December 1977. They were the first held after a new constitution was promulgated in 1974.

At the time, the country was a one-party state with the Popular Movement of the Revolution as the only legal party. Its leader, incumbent president Mobutu Sese Seko, was the only candidate, with voters asked to vote "yes" or "no" to his candidacy. The results showed 98.2% of voters casting a "yes" vote.

== Results ==
Candidate	Party	Votes	%
Mobutu Sese Seko	Popular Movement of the Revolution	10,492,247	98.12
Against		201,557	1.88
Total		10,693,804	100.00
Source: African Elections Database
