= 1977 Zairean parliamentary election =

Parliamentary elections were held in Zaire on 15 and 16 October 1977, having originally been scheduled for 1980. The Popular Movement of the Revolution (MPR) was the sole legal party at the time, with all candidates standing for election to the Legislative Council belonging to it. In total, 2,074 candidates ran for the 289 seats. Voter turnout was 92.8%.

The new electoral system allowed some MPR members sceptical of the government to be elected, who went on to draw attention to corruption by questioning ministers. However, after thirteen of them sent an open letter to President Mobutu Sese Seko calling for a conference on democracy, they were stripped of their parliamentary immunity and sent to prison. After being released from jail, they established the Union for Democracy and Social Progress. As a result of their actions, the powers of the Legislative Council were reduced, and ministers could no longer be questioned by it. MPR members were also more thoroughly scrutinised before the next election in 1982.

== Results ==
Party	Votes	%	Seats	+/–
Popular Movement of the Revolution	10,180,685	100.00	289	+45
Total	10,180,685	100.00	289	+45
Valid votes	10,180,685	98.18		
Invalid/blank votes	188,574	1.82		
Total votes	10,369,259	100.00		
Registered voters/turnout	11,177,484	92.77		
Source: Nohlen et al.
