= 1984 Zairean presidential election =

- 29 July 1984
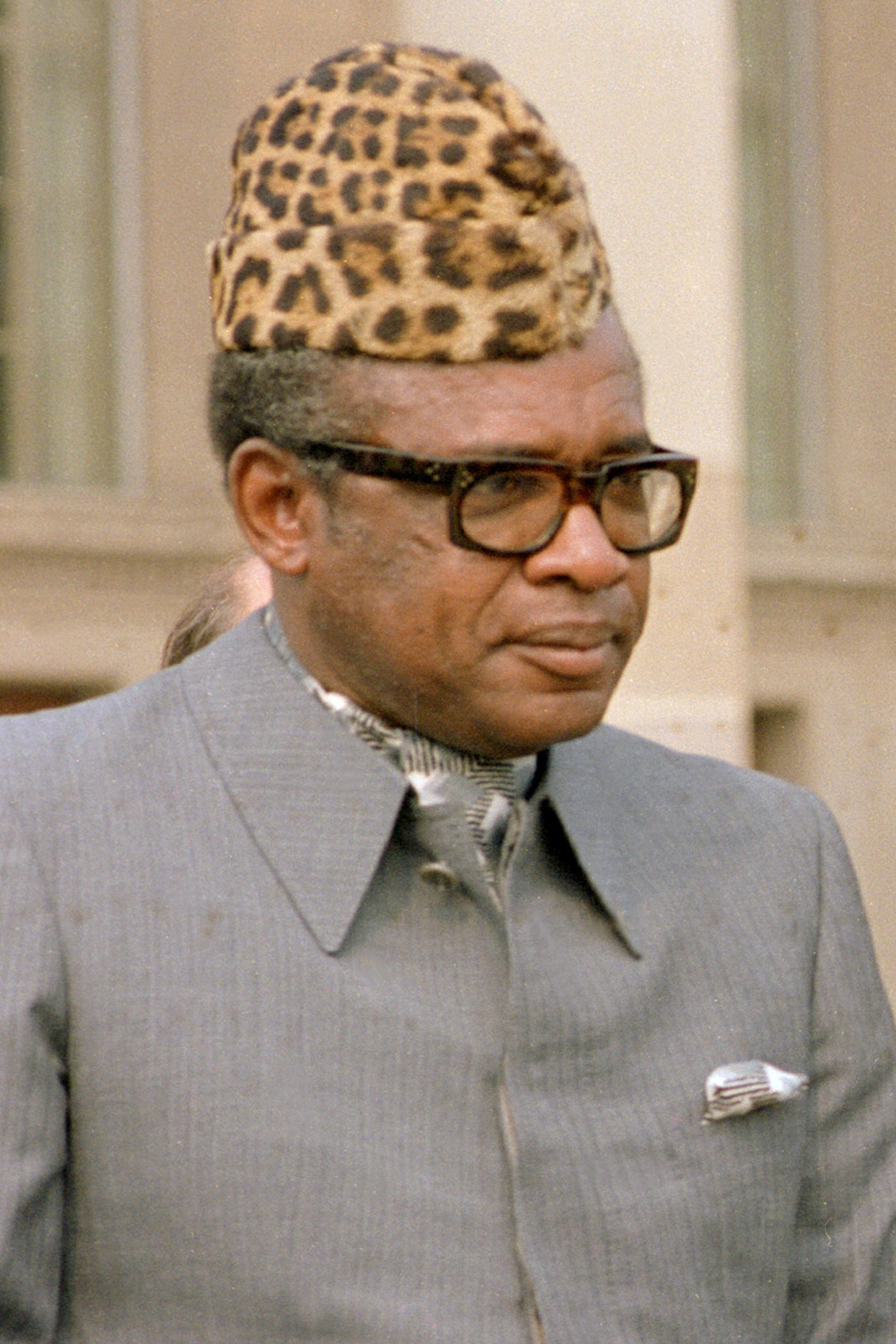
| Nominee | Mobutu Sese Seko |
| Party | MPR |
| Popular vote | 14,885,997 |
| Percentage | 99.16% |
- Results by province Mobutu: 90–100%
President before election
Mobutu Sese Seko
MPR
Elected President
Mobutu Sese Seko
MPR

Presidential elections were held in Zaire on 29 July 1984. At the time, the country was a one-party state with the Popular Movement of the Revolution as the only legal party. Its leader, incumbent president Mobutu Sese Seko, was the only candidate, with voters asked to vote "yes" or "no" to his candidacy. The results showed 99.16% of voters casting a "yes" vote.

== Results ==
| Candidate | Party | Votes | % |
|---|---|---|---|
| Mobutu Sese Seko | Popular Movement of the Revolution | 14,885,997 | 99.16 |
| Against | | 126,101 | 0.84 |
| Total | | 15,012,098 | 100.00 |
Source: African Elections Database
