= Laurent Mbariko =

Laurent Jean-Pierre Mbariko (January 19, 1925 – December 30, 1972), from the Kwilu region of the Democratic Republic of Congo, was a prominent Congolese politician who played a significant role in Congo's independence from Belgium. After elementary schooling in Catholic missionary schools, he followed a fast-track training for teachers. After teaching in the Kwilu, he moved to Leopoldville, the capital, in the late 1940s. He became a leader in the scouting movement, and later became involved in the struggle for independence. His name is among those Congolese leaders who compiled key documents laying out the aspiration for independence from Belgium in the late 1950s.

== Government work ==
At the first free elections in 1959 he was elected Senator on the Parti Solidaire Africain (PSA) list headed by Antoine Gizenga. He later joined the Parti National du Peuple (PNP) party. He once served as Vice-President in the Senate.

He was included in the Ileo government on September 5, 1960, as Vice Minister for Defense. He also participated in the government of national unity led by Cyrille Adoula, who entered office August 2, 1961. He held the post of Secretary of State for Planning, Development, and International Cooperation.

He is known for his strong personality and savvy in international affairs. President Joseph Kasavubu often sent him in numerous state missions. He represented the Congo in the Euro-African parliamentary conference in Strasbourg, France (June 19–24, 1961).

== Death ==
When Mobutu came to power through a coup in 1965, Mbariko was offered but declined government assignments. It was his way of protesting against the undemocratic process. He exiled himself to his native Kwilu where he died of illness on December 30, 1972. His integrity and wisdom have since been revered in tribal music.
