= Mpinga Kasenda =

Prime Minister of Zaire from 1977 to 1979

First State Commissioner of Zaire
- In office 6 July 1977 – 6 March 1979
- President: Mobuto Sese Seko
- Preceded by: Position established
- Succeeded by: André Bo-Boliko Lokonga

Personal details
- Born: 30 August 1937 Tshilomba, Kasaï, Belgian Congo
- Died: 7 May 1994 (aged 56) Kinshasa, Zaire
- Party: Popular Movement of the Revolution
- Education: Lovanium University

Mpinga Kasenda (30 August 1937 – 7 May 1994) was a Congolese politician who served as the prime minister of Zaire from 6 July 1977 to 6 March 1979 and the foreign minister from 1993 to 1994. He was killed in a plane crash near the airport in Kinshasa.

== Biography ==
Mpinga Kasenda was born on 30 August 1937 in Tshilomba, Kasaï, Belgian Congo. He earned a doctorate in political science from Lovanium University.

On 29 January 1985, at Mobutu's recommendation Kasenda was elected First Vice Chairman of the Central Committee Bureau of the Popular Movement of the Revolution (MPR).

== Citations ==
Political offices
New title	First State Commissioner of Zaire; 1977–1979	Succeeded by André Bo-Boliko Lokonga
