= 1970 Democratic Republic of the Congo parliamentary election =

Parliamentary elections were held in the Democratic Republic of the Congo on 15 November 1970. They were the first parliamentary elections held since Joseph Mobutu seized power in a coup five years earlier.

Voters were presented with a single list from President Mobutu's party, the Popular Movement of the Revolution (MPR). They only had the choice of voting "yes" or "no" to the list of 420 candidates for the National Assembly, who had been chosen from 2,500 applicants at the MPR's congress on 19 September 1970. Although a constitution enacted earlier that year allowed for a second political party, the MPR was the only party allowed to nominate candidates. Presidential elections had been held earlier in the month under similar conditions, with voters only having the option of voting "yes" or "no" to Mobutu's candidacy.

Over 99% of valid votes approved the MPR list. However, the MPR list received considerably less support than Mobutu had received in the presidential election. Whilst only 157 people voted to reject Mobutu's candidacy out of over 10.1 million votes cast, 72,300 people rejected the MPR list, while another 91,000 cast blank or spoiled ballots.

A month after the elections, the MPR was formally declared the only party legally permitted to function in the country. with Law 70-001 of 23 December 1970 amending the text of article 4 of the constitution to state that "The Popular Movement of the Revolution is the sole political party of the Republic" (Le Mouvement populaire de la révolution est le seul parti politique de la République.). However, the country had effectively been a single-party state since the MPR's formation in 1967. The country was renamed Zaire a year later, and the MPR remained the only legal party until 1990.

== Results ==
Party	Votes	%	Seats	+/–
Popular Movement of the Revolution	9,691,132	99.26	420	New
Against	72,378	0.74	–	–
Total	9,763,510	100.00	420	+253
Valid votes	9,763,510	99.08		
Invalid/blank votes	91,007	0.92		
Total votes	9,854,517	100.00		
Registered voters/turnout	10,101,330	97.56		
Source: Inter-Parliamentary Union
