= Constitution of Zaire =

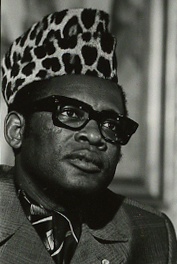
Mobutu Sese Seko, pictured in 1976

The Constitution of Zaire (French: Constitution du Zaïre), was promulgated on 15 August 1974, revised on 15 February 1978, and amended on 5 July 1990. It provided a renewed legal basis for the regime of Mobutu Sese Seko who had emerged as the country's dictator after the Congo Crisis in 1965.

Defining state power as an extension of Mobutu's power, the 1974 constitution codified Zaire as a one-party state with the Popular Movement of the Revolution as the only legally permitted party. It enshrined the status of Mobutism as the state ideology. The 1974 constitution was the third in the Congo's post-independence history, replacing earlier constitutions adopted to replace the original basic law of 1960, adopted in 1964 and 1967.

According to academics Merwin Crawford Young and Thomas Turner, the 1974 constitution should be seen as the culmination of a period of Zairean political history beginning in 1970. The phase was marked by growing national self-confidence and the emergence of Mobutu's Authenticité policy to remove non-"authentic" foreign influences from Zairian society. Young and Turner describe the 1974 constitution as the "normative embodiment of the Mobutist state at its apogee" and argued that it was an unprecedented legal expression of "centralized, untrammelled personal power".

Under the provisions of the Constitution, the MPR was recognised as Zaire's only "institution." The MPR's president was ex officio President of Zaire itself, vested with "plenitude of power exercise" over government and judiciary (Articles 28 and 30). Mobutism was declared the state ideology (Article 46) and all Zairean citizens were automatically made members of the MPR at birth (Article 8). Mobutu himself was exempted from the restrictions on power mentioned in the document, and had the right to unilaterally amend the document at will. The state of Zaire's legal system as established by the constitution led Marcel Lihau, a jurist and former president of the Supreme Court of Justice who had fled the country, to remark that "Mobutu is the constitution in Zaire". Young and Turner did, however, note that the "Mobutist state never approximated the leviathan vision embodied in the constitution". In particular, after Shaba I and Shaba II invasions (1977–78), Mobutu was forced to liberalize Zaire's political structure to allow contested elections and a degree of political dissent.

The 1974 constitution remained in force, with some subsequent modifications, until the collapse of the Mobutu regime during the First Congo War. In 1994, the first of two Transitional Constitutions were adopted; the current Constitution of the Democratic Republic of the Congo was adopted in 2006.
