= 1970 Democratic Republic of the Congo presidential election =

- 1 November 1970
- Turnout: 100.30%
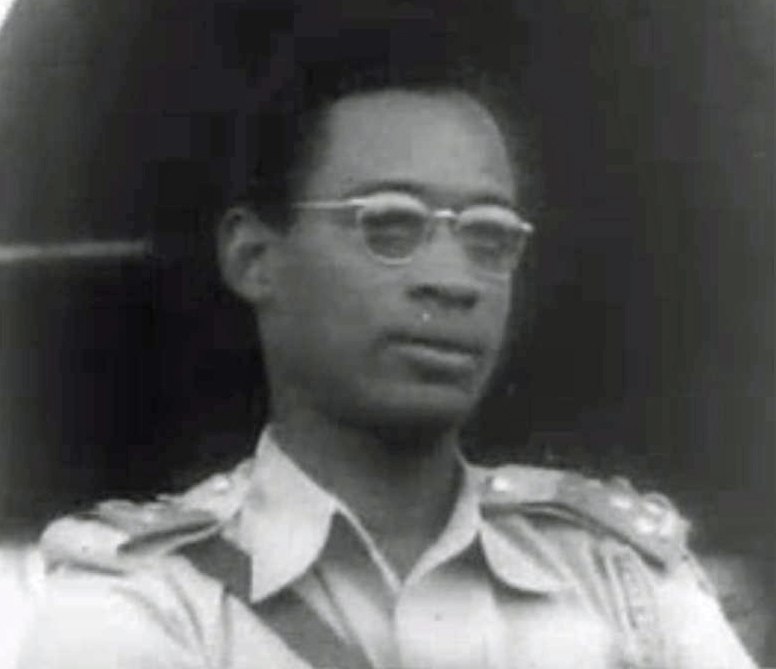
Nominee	Joseph Mobutu
Party	MPR
Popular vote	10,131,669
Percentage	100%
- Results by province Mobutu: 100%
President before election
Joseph Mobutu
MPR
Elected President
Joseph Mobutu
MPR

Presidential elections were held in the Democratic Republic of the Congo on 1 November 1970. The only candidate was Joseph Mobutu, who had taken power in a military coup five years earlier. The elections took the format of a "yes" or "no" vote for Mobutu's candidacy. According to official figures, Mobutu was confirmed in office with near-unanimous support, with only 157 "no" votes out of over 10.1 million total votes cast. Mobutu also received around 30,000 more "yes" votes than the number of registered voters, even though voting was not compulsory.

== Background ==
Following the promulgation of a new constitution after a referendum in 1964, general elections were held in the newly renamed Democratic Republic of the Congo in March and April in 1965. The elections were won by the Congolese National Convention, led by former secessionist leader Moise Tshombe, which took 122 of the 177 seats. However, President Joseph Kasa-Vubu later dismissed Tshombe and appointed Évariste Kimba as Prime Minister instead. In a vote in parliament on 14 November, Kimba failed to secure parliamentary approval for his government. However, Kasa-Vubu reappointed him as Prime Minister the following day. Ten days later, army commander Mobutu led a military coup and installed himself as President, banning all political activity for at least five years.

On 20 May 1967 Mobutu formed the Popular Movement of the Revolution as his political vehicle. In June 1967 a new constitution was drawn up, establishing a unitary state with a strong executive presidential system and unicameral parliament. It also limited the number of political parties to two, and enfranchised women. It was approved by a referendum in which 97.8% of voters voted for it.

Following a census in early 1970, presidential elections were organised for 1 November. The date was set so that Mobutu would have passed his fortieth birthday by the time the elections occurred, as the constitution stated that candidates must be at least forty years old.

== Results ==
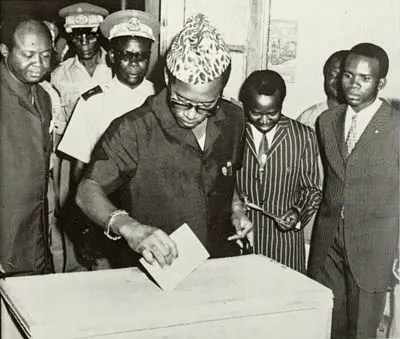
Mobutu votes for himself

Although the constitution allowed for the existence of a second party, the MPR was the only party allowed to nominate candidates. As a result, Mobutu ran unopposed, with the election taking the form of a referendum on whether to confirm him in office. Voting was not secret; voters could cast a green ballot paper for a "yes" vote, or a red ballot paper for a "no" vote. There was considerable public pressure to endorse Mobutu's candidacy; a "yes" vote was deemed a vote for hope, while a "no" vote was deemed a vote for chaos, anarchy and foreign ideologies.

The published results showed only 157 'no' votes, with 10,131,669 votes in favour. The total number of votes (10,131,826) was almost 30,500 more than the number of registered voters (10,101,330).

Candidate	Party	Votes	%
Joseph Mobutu	Popular Movement of the Revolution	10,131,669	100.00
Against		157	0.00
Total		10,131,826	100.00
Total votes		10,131,826	–
Registered voters/turnout		10,101,330	100.30
Source: Nohlen et al.

== Aftermath ==
Parliamentary elections were held on 15 November in a similar fashion; the MPR was the only party allowed to nominate candidates, and official results showed the MPR list was approved by over 99% of the voters. Soon afterwards, the MPR was formally declared to be the sole legal party, though the country had effectively been a one-party state since the MPR's formation.

The country was renamed Zaire the following year, and Mobutu changed his name to Mobutu Sese Seko in 1972. He continued to rule the country as president until being overthrown in 1997.
