= Parti Solidaire Africain =

Defunct socialist party in the Democratic Republic of the Congo

- President-General: Antoine Gizenga
- Provincial President: Cléophas Kamitatu
- Founded: February 1, 1959
- Dissolved: 1965
- Ideology: Congolese nationalism Socialism
- Political position: Left-wing
- Slogan: The intellectuals conceive, the old support, the young execute.

The Parti Solidaire Africain (lit. 'African Solidarity Party') or PSA was a political party active in the Belgian Congo and subsequently in the Republic of the Congo after the country received its independence.

== History ==
The PSA was formed in the aftermath of a series of riots in Leopoldville in 1959 which led to the rapid growth of African nationalist parties and prompted the Belgian government to announce that independence for the colony was his long term aim. It was formally established on 1 February 1959. The new party's President-General was Antoine Gizenga whilst Cléophas Kamitatu served as Provincial President.

The PSA quickly became one of the best organised of the parties that emerged following the king's edict, and it established a strong base amongst the rural communities of the Kwango and Kwilu Districts of the country. Along with the Mouvement National Congolais the PSA was unusual amongst the new parties in that it did not identify with one ethnic group but rather preached socialism.

After the elections of 1960, the party was part of the inaugural post-independence coalition government of Patrice Lumumba. However, the 1961 elimination of Lumumba saw the PSA go into opposition and the rebellion that broke out in Kwilu during the Congo Crisis was the work of a wing of the PSA under the Maoist Pierre Mulele. Effectively sidelined from mainstream politics, the PSA disappeared completely after the emergence of Joseph-Désiré Mobutu in 1965.

== Sources ==
- Willame, Jean-Claude (1972). Patrimonialism and Political Change in the Congo. Stanford University Press. ISBN 9780804707930 – via Google Books.
- Weiss, Herbert F. (1967). Political Protest in the Congo: The Parti Solidaire Africain during the Independence Struggle. Princeton: Princeton University Press.
