= 1982 Zairean parliamentary election =

Parliamentary elections were held in Zaire on 18 and 19 September 1982. The Popular Movement of the Revolution was the only legal party at the time, and all candidates who stood for election to the Legislative Council had to be members of it. In total, 1,409 candidates ran for the 310 seats (increased from 252 due to population growth) in 154 constituencies.

== Results ==
Party	Seats	+/–
Popular Movement of the Revolution	310	+21
Total	310	+21
Source: IPU
