= Union of Federalists and Independent Republicans =

Political party in the Democratic Republic of the Congo

Union of Federalists and Independent Republicans Union des fédéralistes et des Républicains Indépendants
- Abbreviation: UFERI
- Leaders: Jean Nguza Karl-i-Bond (until 2003); Gabriel Kyungu (until 1996); Kavidi Wivine N'Landu (1994–?)
- Founder: Jean Nguza Karl-i-Bond
- Founded: August 1990
- Registered: January 1991
- Merger of: Fenadec; PRI
- Succeeded by: UNAFEC
- Youth wing: JUFERI
- Ideology: Federalism; Regionalism; Anti-Kasaian racism (until 1994)
- Political position: Right-wing

The Union of Federalists and Independent Republicans (French: Union des fédéralistes et des Républicains Indépendants, UFERI) is a political party in Democratic Republic of the Congo that advocates for Federalism with significant autonomy for the provinces. During the 1990s, it also adopted an explicit policy of ethnic cleansing Luba Kasaians in Katanga. Although the party's primary support base comes from Katanga, it gained some support in Kongo Central during the early 1990s.

Originally an opposition party, the UFERI later aligned itself with Mobutu's regime, leading state-sanctioned pogroms against ethnic Luba from Kasai under its youth militia, the JUFERI (Jeunesses de l'Union des Fédéralistes et des Républicains Independents), from 1992 to 1994. In 1996, the party was banned from organizing political activities in Katanga, split, and, since the death of its founder in July 2003, "there has been little reference to UFERI activity."

== History ==
=== Mobutu era ===
The party was formed in August 1990 by Jean Nguza Karl-i-Bond, the state commissioner of foreign affairs, through the merger of the National Federation of Committed Democrats (Fédération Nationale des Démocrates Commettres—Fenadec) and the Independent Republicans’ Party (Parti des Républicains Indépendants—PRI). Nguza declared the party to be a "serious adversary to the MPR." Although the party's primary support base came from Katanga, it gained some support in Kongo Central in the early 1990s because of Nguza's marriage to Kavidi Wivine N'Landu, the daughter of a prominent family in the region.

In 1991, it was one of the major parties that formed the Sacred Union of the Radical Opposition (Union Sacree de l’Opposition Radicale, USOR) alongside the UDPS and the PDSC. However, in an effort to divide the opposition, Mobutu lured Nguza away from Tshisekedi's coalition, appointing him prime minister in November of the same year, leading several members into a governoring coalition called the Alliance des Forces Patriotiques (AFP), resulting in the party's expulsion from the Sacred Union. Another party leader, Gabriel Kyungu wa Kumwanza, was appointed governor of Katanga.

Amid rampant unemployment among youth due to the collapse of Gécamines in the late 1980s, Kyungu and Nguza recruited Katangan youth into their party and enlisted them in its youth militia wing, the JUFERI (Jeunesses de l'Union des Fédéralistes et des Républicains Indépendants).

When the Sovereign National Conference (CNS) elected Tshisekedi as prime minister in 1992 and forced Nguza to resign, Nguza warned that UFERI's Katangan supporters would not accept Tshisekedi's appointment. The party subsequently adopted an explicit policy of ethnic cleansing against the Luba Kasaians, who tended to support Tshisekedi, in Katanga’s major mining cities, in particular Kolwezi. Violent clashes between the two groups were reported.

Kyungu, who blamed the Kasaian Luba for Katanga's economic struggles and accused them of attempting to seize power, such as he claimed they had done in Kinshasa, led a brutal ethnic cleansing campaign from 1992 to 1994. By 1994, the JUFERI militia had killed an estimated 5,000 people and displaced approximately 1,350,000 through a series of pogroms that were allegedly sanctioned by Mobutu.

Following a heart attack in 1994, Nguza turned over the administration of the UFERI to his wife.

In mid-1996, the Kengo wa Dondo government banned the UFERI from organizing political activities in Katanga, leading UFERI leaders to denounce the government's "anti-democratic behavior."

In September 1996, the UFERI split into two factions, one led by Kyungu and the other by Karl-I-Bond. The more popular and outspoken Kyungu led the faction known as UFERI-Originele, which advocated for the immediate recognition of Katanga as a federated state. In February 1997, Kyungu defected from the Forces politiques du conclave (FPC), severing his overt political ties with Mobutu.

=== Post-Mobutu ===
In 1998, Kyungu was given the ambassadorship of the DRC to Kenya by then-president Laurent Kabila; the Kenyan president's office was sent a letter of protest by UDPS against the appointment of Kyungu by Kabila due to Kyungu's usage of the JUFERI in violence against the Kasai supporters of the UDPS during his time as governor.

During the Sun City negotiations, the Union of Nationalist Federalists of the Congo (UNAFEC) was formed, with Honorius Kisimba Ngoy serving as its national leader and Kyungu as its Katanga leader. Many of the new party's senior figures had previously served as members of the UFERI during the ethnic cleansing.

Since Nguza's passing in July 2003, "there has been little reference to UFERI activity."

== Works cited ==
- Kisangani, Emizet Francois; Bobb, Scott F. (2009). Historical Dictionary of the Democratic Republic of the Congo. Scarecrow Press. p. 520–521. ISBN 9780810857612.
- Banks, Arthur S.; Isacoff, Judith F.; Müller, Thomas Christian; Overstreet, Williams (2009). Political Handbook of the World 2009. CQ Press. p. 297. ISBN 9781604265842.
