= Union of Mongo =

Union of Mongo Union des Mongo
- Founded: January 1960
- Ideology: Ethnic interest

The Union of Mongo (UNIMO) is a former political party of the Democratic Republic of the Congo. The ethnic party was founded in January 1960 to represent the Mongo people. UNIMO was founded as a party of the Mongo cultural union by Justin Bomboko, Léon Engulu, Eugène N'Djoku Ey'Obaba, and others. UNIMO is led by Eugène N'Djoku Ey'Obaba and its headquarters are in Coquilhatville (Mbandaka).

In 1962, the Central Basin State was created. Engulu, its president, declared on 29 September 1962: "It is therefore up to the Mongo Union and particularly to its leaders to raise the Mongo to the rank of an organized, respected, proud and prosperous people".

== See also ==
- List of political parties in the Democratic Republic of the Congo
