= Legislative Council (Zaire) =

Legislature of the Republic of Zaire

The National Legislative Council of Zaire (French: Conseil National Legislatif) was the unicameral legislature of the Republic of Zaire. Succeeding the National Assembly under the provisions of the 1974 constitution, the Legislative Council operated as one of the five organs of the national government. It was abolished in 1992 after a national conference established the High Council of the Republic.

== History ==
Throughout his tenure in office, Mobuto Sese Soku centralised power within the Republic of the Congo, abolishing provincial governments, and establishing the Popular Movement of the Revolution as the sole legal political party in 1967. In 1971, the nation was renamed Zaire, and in 1974, a new constitution was promulgated, which replaced the National Assembly with the National Legislative Council.

== Composition ==
=== 1970 Parliamentary Election ===
Party	Votes	%	Seats	+/–
Popular Movement of the Revolution	9,691,132	99.26	420	New
Against	72,378	0.74	–	–
Total	9,763,510	100.00	420	+253
Valid votes	9,763,510	99.08		
Invalid/blank votes	91,007	0.92		
Total votes	9,854,517	100.00		
Registered voters/turnout	10,101,330	97.56		
Source: Inter-Parliamentary Union

=== 1975 Parliamentary Election ===
Party	Seats	+/–
Popular Movement of the Revolution	244	–176
Total	244	–176
Source: IPU

=== 1977 Parliamentary Election ===
Party	Votes	%	Seats	+/–
Popular Movement of the Revolution	10,180,685	100.00	289	+45
Total	10,180,685	100.00	289	+45
Valid votes	10,180,685	98.18		
Invalid/blank votes	188,574	1.82		
Total votes	10,369,259	100.00		
Registered voters/turnout	11,177,484	92.77		
Source: Nohlen et al.

=== 1982 Parliamentary Election ===
Party	Seats	+/–
Popular Movement of the Revolution	310	+21
Total	310	+21
Source: IPU

=== 1987 Parliamentary Election ===
Party	Seats	+/–
Popular Movement of the Revolution	210	–100
Total	210	–100
Source: IPU
