= First Congolese Republic =

1960–1971 state in Central Africa

Coordinates: 4°24′S 15°24′E

Republic of the Congo (1960–1964) République du Congo (French) Democratic Republic of the Congo (1964–1965) République démocratique du Congo (French)
- 1960–1965
- Flag; Top: (1960–1963); Bottom: (1966–1971) Coat of arms Top: (1960–1963); Bottom: (1963–1971)
- Motto: Justice – Paix – Travail ("Justice – Peace – Work")
- Anthem: Debout Congolais ("Arise, Congolese")
- Capital: Léopoldville (now "Kinshasa")
- Common languages: French (official); Lingala; Kikongo (Note: "Kikongo" here is actually referring to the Kituba language – which is known as Kikongo ya leta by its speakers – not the Kongo language proper. The confusion arises from the fact that the government of the RC officially recognized and referred to the language simply as "Kikongo".); Kiswahili; Tshiluba (national)
- Demonym: Léopoldville-Congolese
- Government: Federal parliamentary republic (1960–1964) Unitary parliamentary republic (1964–1965)
- President
  - 1960–1965: Joseph Kasa-Vubu
- Prime Minister
  - 1960: Patrice Lumumba
  - 1960, 1961: Joseph Iléo
  - 1961–1964: Cyrille Adoula
  - 1964–1965: Moïse Tshombe
  - 1965: Évariste Kimba
- Historical era: Cold War
  - Independence: 30 June 1960
  - Kasai defeated: 30 December 1961
  - Congo-Stanleyville defeated: 16 January 1962
  - Katanga defeated: 15 January 1963
  - Luluabourg Constitution: 1 August 1964
  - Coup d'état: 25 November 1965
- Currency: Congolese franc
Preceded by	Succeeded by
Belgian Congo	Second Congolese Republic
- Today part of: Democratic Republic of the Congo

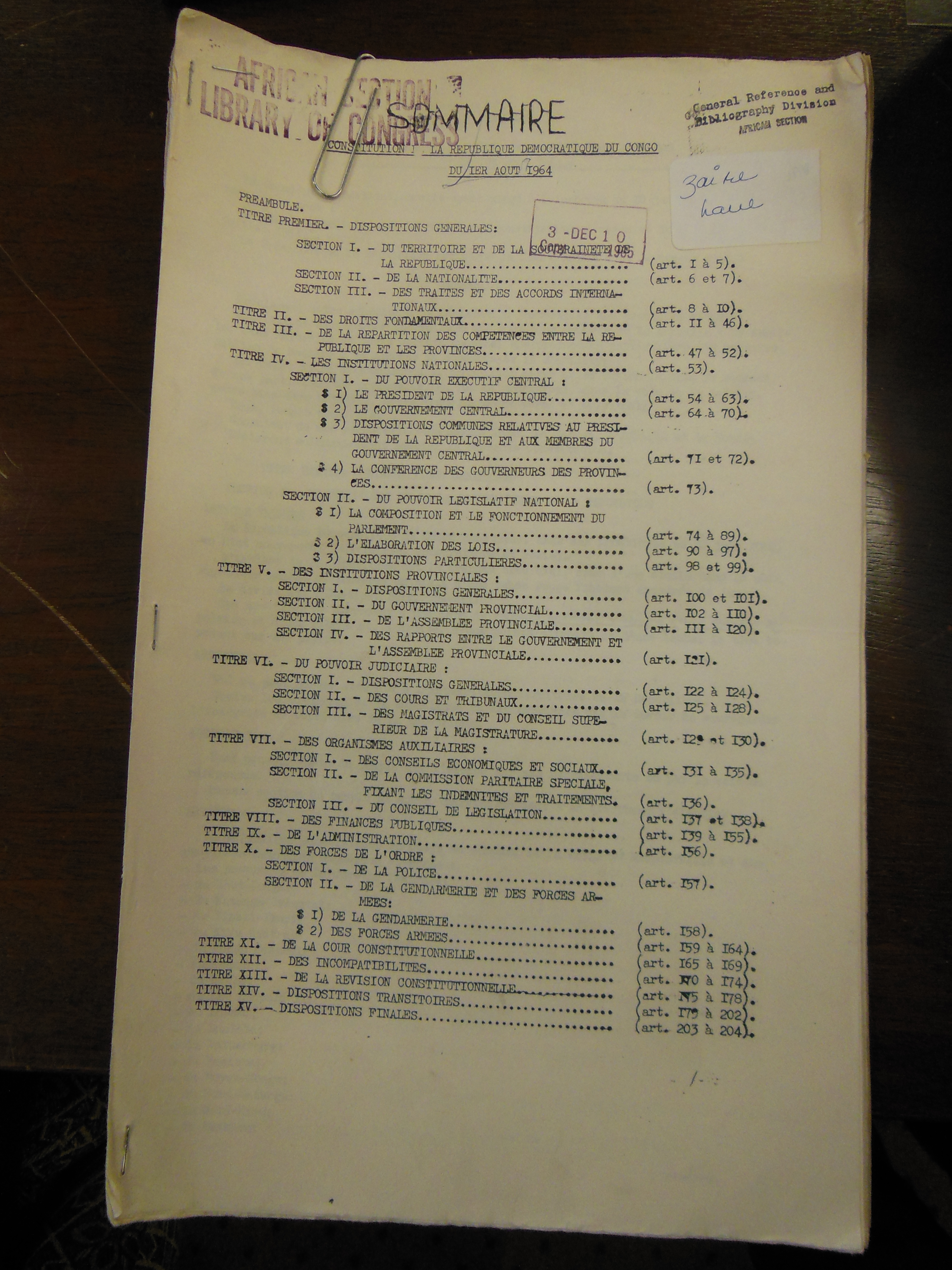
1964 Constitution of the Democratic Republic of the Congo

The Republic of the Congo (French: République du Congo) or First Congolese Republic, formerly the Belgian Congo and now called the Democratic Republic of the Congo, was a state in Central Africa that gained independence in 1960 and continued until a 1965 coup d'état by General Joseph Mobutu.

The country had been a colony of Belgium since 1908 and was granted independence in 1960 as a result of pressure from the Congolese nationalist movement led by Patrice Lumumba. Almost immediately after independence, the country was plunged into the Congo Crisis, a series of civil wars and secessionist conflicts, notably with the break-away State of Katanga, which lasted until 1965. The democratic government of Lumumba was overthrown in an army coup led by Joseph-Désiré Mobutu (later known as Mobutu Sese Seko) and Lumumba was killed by Katangan forces in 1961. A UN peace-keeping mission operated in the country from 1960 to 1964 during which a multi-national force of 20,000 troops was deployed. In 1965 Mobutu seized absolute power in a second coup, changing the country's name to Zaire in 1971.

== Name ==
From 1960 to 1966, the country was also known as Congo-Léopoldville (after its capital) to distinguish it from its northwestern neighbor, which is also called the Republic of the Congo, alternatively known as Congo-Brazzaville. In 1964, the state's official name was changed to the Democratic Republic of the Congo, but the two countries continued to be distinguished by their capitals; with the renaming of Léopoldville as Kinshasa in 1966, it also became known as Congo-Kinshasa. After Joseph Désiré Mobutu, commander-in-chief of the national army, seized control of the government in 1965, the Democratic Republic of the Congo became the Republic of Zaire in 1971; but it was reverted to the Democratic Republic of the Congo in 1997. The period between 1960 and 1965 is referred to as the First Congolese Republic.

== Colonial rule ==
Conditions in the Congo improved following the Belgian government's takeover in 1908 of the Congo Free State, which had been a personal possession of the Belgian king. Some Bantu languages were taught in primary schools, a rare occurrence in colonial education. Colonial doctors greatly reduced the spread of African trypanosomiasis, commonly known as sleeping sickness.

During World War II, the small Congolese army achieved several victories against the Italians in East Africa. The Belgian Congo, which was also rich in uranium deposits, supplied the uranium that was used by the United States to build the atomic weapons that were used in the bombings of Hiroshima and Nagasaki in August 1945.

The colonial administration implemented a variety of economic reforms to improve infrastructure: railways, ports, roads, mines, plantations and industrial areas. The Congolese people, however, lacked political power and faced legal discrimination. All colonial policies were decided in Brussels and Léopoldville. The Belgian Colony-secretary and Governor-general, neither elected by the Congolese people, wielded absolute power.

Among the Congolese people, resistance against their undemocratic regime grew over time. In 1955, the Congolese upper class (the so-called "évolués"), many of whom had been educated in Europe, initiated a campaign to end the inequality.

== Congo Crisis ==
In May 1960, the MNC party or Mouvement National Congolais, led by Patrice Lumumba, won the parliamentary elections, and Lumumba was appointed prime minister. Joseph Kasa-Vubu of ABAKO was elected president by the parliament. Other parties that emerged include the Parti Solidaire Africain (PSA), led by Antoine Gizenga, and the Parti National du Peuple (PNP), led by Albert Delvaux and Laurent Mbariko.

The Belgian Congo achieved independence on 30 June 1960. On 1 July Lumumba sent a wire to the UN to request membership, stating that the Congo "accepts without reservation the obligations stipulated in the Charter of the UN and undertakes to abide by the same in absolute good faith." UN Secretary-General Dag Hammarskjöld cabled the Foreign Ministry, pointing out the difficulty in admitting the country into the UN under its name in the face of another application for membership from the neighboring Congo, preparing for independence from French control. A delegation was sent from Brazzaville, the capital of the French Congo, to Léopoldville to resolve the matter. In the end, it was decided that the former Belgian Congo would be recognised as the Republic of the Congo or Congo-Léopoldville while the former French Congo would be known as the Congolese Republic or Congo-Brazzaville.

In September 1960 the Fourth emergency special session of the United Nations General Assembly needed to be called in the wake of a Security Council veto by the USSR. The Congo Crisis, a period of political upheaval and conflict between 1960 and 1965 in that land, had entered full swing. Hammarskjöld's second term was cut short when on 18 September 1961 he died in a plane crash near Ndola, Northern Rhodesia while en route to cease-fire negotiations during the Congo Crisis.

Following a constitutional referendum in 1964 it was renamed the "Democratic Republic of the Congo".

=== Secessionist movements ===
Shortly after independence, the provinces of Katanga (with Moise Tshombe) and South Kasai engaged in secessionist struggles against the new leadership.

Subsequent events led to a crisis between President Kasa-Vubu and Prime Minister Lumumba. On 5 September 1960, Kasavubu dismissed Lumumba from office. Lumumba declared Kasa-Vubu's action "unconstitutional" and a crisis between the two leaders developed.

Lumumba had previously appointed Joseph Mobutu chief of staff of the new Congolese army, the Armee Nationale Congolaise (ANC). Taking advantage of the leadership crisis between Kasa-Vubu and Lumumba, Mobutu garnered enough support within the army to inspire mutinous action. With financial support from the United States and Belgium, Mobutu made payments to his soldiers to generate their loyalty. The aversion of Western powers towards communism and leftist ideology, in general, influenced their decision to finance Mobutu's quest to maintain "order" in the new state by neutralizing Kasa-Vubu and Lumumba in a coup by proxy.

On 17 January 1961, Katangan forces, supported by the Belgian government, which desired to retain mining rights for copper and diamonds in Katanga and South Kasai, executed Patrice Lumumba and several of his aides at a pig farm near Élisabethville.

On at least three occasions over the next two years, Katangan forces under the command of foreign mercenaries clashed with the ONUC, but in February 1963 Katanga was reintegrated into the national territory.

From 1960 to 1964 the peacekeeping effort was the largest, most complex, and most costly operation ever carried out by the United Nations. Up to 20,000 troops were involved by the ONUC, the military components of which were completely withdrawn by 30 June 1964.

== Coup d'état ==
Following five years of extreme instability and civil unrest, Joseph-Désiré Mobutu, then Lieutenant General, overthrew Kasa-Vubu in a 1965 CIA-backed coup. He had the support of the US for his staunch opposition to communism, which would presumably make him a roadblock to communist activities in Africa.

Mobutu declared himself president for five years, saying that he needed that long to undo the damage that the politicians had done in the country's first five years of independence. However, within two years, he had set up the Popular Movement of the Revolution as the country's only legal party. In 1970, he appeared alone on the ballot in the country's first direct presidential election. Two weeks later, a single list of PMR candidates was elected to the legislature. For all intents and purposes, the Democratic Republic of the Congo had come to an end, but it was another year before Mobutu officially changed the country's name to Zaire.

== Flags/Coats of arms ==
Flag from 1960–1963

Flag from 1963–1966

Flag from 1966–1971

Coat of arms from 1960–1963

Coat of arms from 1963–1971

== See also ==
- History of the Democratic Republic of the Congo

== General and cited sources ==
- Kanza, Thomas R. (1994). The Rise and Fall of Patrice Lumumba: Conflict in the Congo (expanded ed.). Rochester, Vermont: Schenkman Books, Inc. ISBN 978-0-87073-901-9.
- Merriam, Alan P. (1961). Congo: Background of Conflict. Evanston, Illinois: Northwestern University Press. OCLC 424186.
