= Louis Alphonse Koyagialo =

Congolese politician

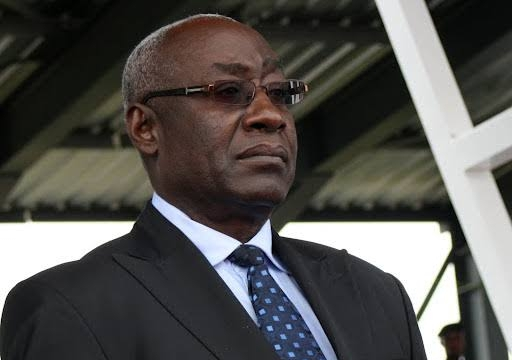

Prime Minister of the Democratic Republic of the Congo Acting
- In office 6 March 2012 – 18 April 2012
- President: Joseph Kabila
- Preceded by: Adolphe Muzito
- Succeeded by: Matata Ponyo Mapon

Personal details
- Born: 23 March 1947 Yakoma, Belgian Congo (now Democratic Republic of the Congo)
- Died: 14 December 2014 (aged 67) Johannesburg, South Africa
- Party: PALU

Louis Alphonse Daniel Koyagialo Ngbase te Gerengbo (23 March 1947 – 14 December 2014) was a Congolese politician. He was appointed Deputy Prime Minister of the Democratic Republic of the Congo with responsibility for the Ministry of Postal Services, Telephones, and Telecommunications in the second cabinet of Prime Minister Adolphe Muzito. Following the resignation of Prime Minister Muzito, Koyagialo was Acting Prime Minister from 6 March to 18 April 2012, prior to the appointment of Augustin Matata Ponyo.

Koyagialo was an alumnus of the University of Kinshasa.

== Political career ==
Koyagialo hailed from Equateur Province, originating from the same area as President Mobutu Sese Seko. Under Mobutu, Koyagialo was Governor of Shaba Province (since renamed as Katanga Province) from 1986 to 1990.

In April 2006, he published a book describing the massacre of students at the University of Lubumbashi in 1990. The book claims that only one student is known to have died, the official government position. Other sources give varying estimates of the number of students who died, with Amnesty International suggesting that the figure is between 50 and 150.

Under President Joseph Kabila, Koyagialo was appointed executive secretary of the Members for the Alliance for the Presidential Majority, Kabila's political cartel.

In a minor cabinet reshuffle announced on 11 September 2011, Koyagialo was appointed Deputy Prime Minister and Minister for Posts, Telephones and Telecommunications. On 14 October 2011 he visited the headquarters of the Independent National Electoral Commission, INEC, to sign the Code of Conduct for the upcoming elections on behalf of Joseph Kabila, who did not attend in person.

On 6 March 2012, President Kabila appointed Koyagialo as interim Prime Minister after the resignation of the government led by Adolphe Muzito. The resignation occurred amid an intensifying armed rebellion in the east of the country, in North Kivu.

On 10 June 2013, Koyagialo was elected Governor of Equateur by a vote of 76-27.

== Bibliography ==
- Louis Alphonse Koyagialo Ngbase te Gerengbo (2006). Massacre de Lubumbashi. s.n. p. 302.

Political offices
Preceded by Adolphe Muzito	Prime Minister of the Democratic Republic of the Congo; Acting; 2012	Succeeded by Augustin Matata Ponyo
