= Congolese nationalism (Democratic Republic of the Congo) =

Political ideology

Congolese nationalism in the Democratic Republic of the Congo was also for a time known as Zairian nationalism during the rule of Mobutu Sese Seko. Congolese nationalism persists among the people of the Democratic Republic of the Congo, in spite of civil war and the lack of a clear definition of what it means to be Congolese.

== History ==
The territory of the Congo was created by Belgian colonial rulers that borrowed the name used by the historic Kongo Kingdom. At the time there was no concept of a Congolese people however, as the people living within the region were divided into ethnic groups. Congolese nationalism first erupted in 1959 during riots against Belgian colonial rule. Attempts to solidify the country quickly collapsed after independence when Mobutu Sese Seko rebelled against the government of Patrice Lumumba in 1960. After several years in power Mobutu renamed the country Zaire in 1971 and sought to define and forge a united Zairian nation through his policy of authenticity, that included efforts to purge Christianity from Zaire – for it was deemed colonial. There have been critics of Zairian/Congolese nationalism who believe that it was a manipulative ploy by Mobutu to gain legitimacy for his rule, though this criticism has been challenged by the persistence of a post-Mobutu nationalism after the fall of Mobutu from power and the renaming of the country back to the Democratic Republic of Congo.
