= Popular Movement of the Revolution =

Ruling party of Zaire from 1967 to 1997

Popular Movement of the Revolution Mouvement populaire de la Révolution
- Abbreviation: MPR
- President: Mobutu Sese Seko
- Founder: Mobutu Sese Seko
- Founded: 20 May 1967
- Dissolved: 16 May 1997
- Headquarters: Kinshasa, Zaire
- Ideology: Mobutism; Zairian nationalism Authenticité; African nationalism Economic nationalism Economic statism Anti-communism; Anti-capitalism; Fascism (disputed); Faction: Neoliberalism
- Political position: Self-proclaimed: Syncretic; By historians: Right-wing to far-right
- Colors: Green
- Legislative Council (1987): 210 / 210

Party flag

The Popular Movement of the Revolution (French: Mouvement Populaire de la Révolution, abbr. MPR) was the ruling political party in Zaire (known for part of its existence as the Democratic Republic of the Congo). For most of its existence, it was the only legally permitted party in the country. It was founded by Joseph-Désiré Mobutu (later Mobutu Sese Seko) on 20 May 1967.

== Ideology ==
The official ideology of the MPR, as laid down in the Manifesto of N'sele in May 1967, incorporated "nationalism", "revolution", and "authenticity". Revolution was described as a "truly national revolution, essentially pragmatic," which called for "the repudiation of both capitalism and communism." One of the MPR's slogans was "Neither left nor right," to which would be added "nor even centre" in later years. Nevertheless, historians consider Mobutu's regime to be right-wing and there is evidence of economic liberalization during Mobutu's rule as he appointed Léon Kengo wa Dondo, a prominent advocate of free market reform, as prime minister.

== One-party period ==
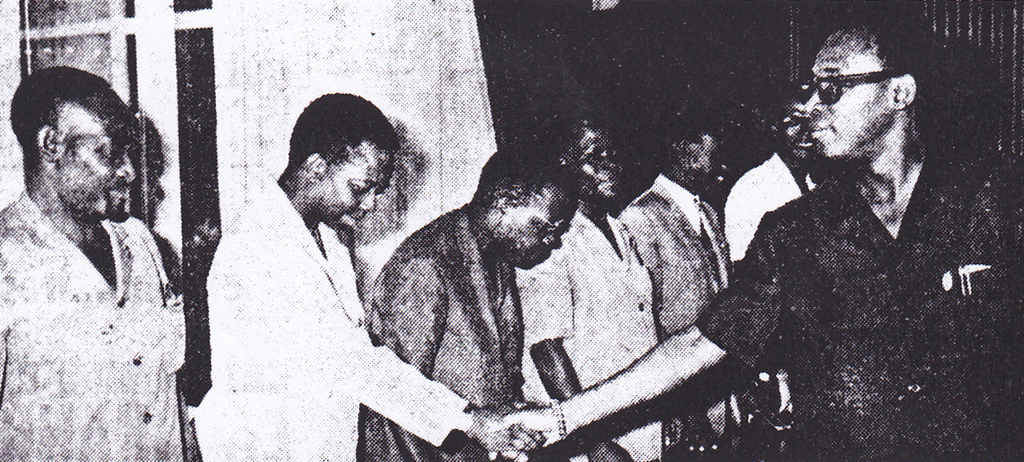
Mobutu greets MPR politburo members near Mount Stanley, 1970

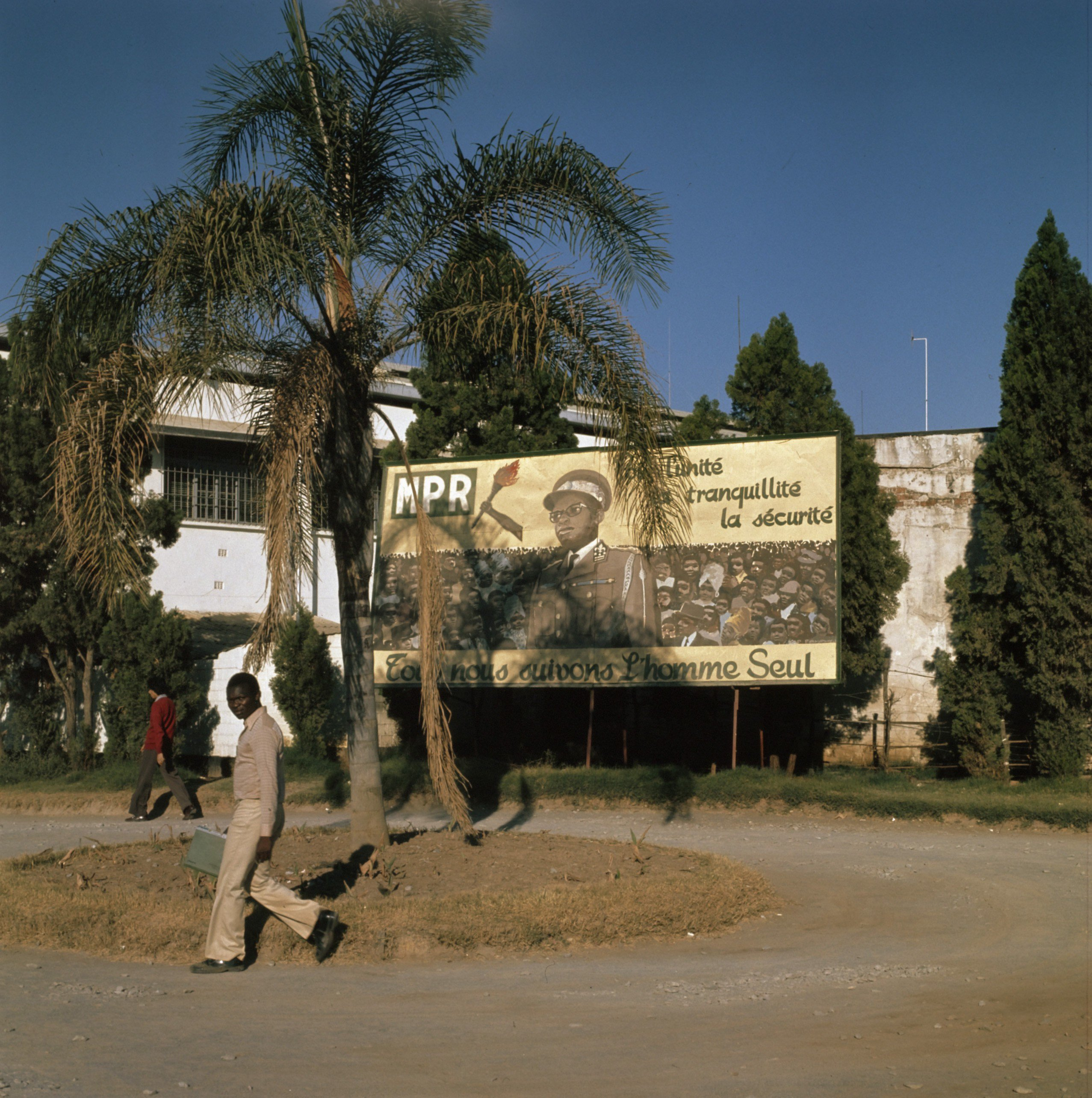
MPR propaganda poster in Kinshasa, 1973

From its formation in 1967 to 1990, the MPR was de facto the only legal party in the country. The 1967 constitution explicitly allowed the existence of two parties. However, the MPR was the only party allowed to nominate candidates in presidential and parliamentary elections held in November 1970. A month later, on 23 December, the constitution was amended to formally declare the MPR to be the only legally permitted party.

The 1974 constitution enshrined the MPR's status as the vanguard of the nation. It stated that "there exists a single institution, the MPR, incarnated by its President," that the "President of the MPR is ex officio President of the Republic, and holds the plenitude of power exercise," and that "Mobutism" was constitutional doctrine. All citizens of Zaire became members of the MPR at birth. In effect, the government was a transmission belt for the MPR, and the MPR gradually subsumed ministries, universities, and trade unions.

The MPR elected its president every seven years at its national convention (five years before 1978). At that time, the MPR's president was automatically nominated as the sole candidate for a seven-year term as president of the republic; he was confirmed in office by a national referendum. Mobutu was elected unopposed as president three times under this system, with official figures showing an implausible 98 percent or more of voters approving his candidacy against at most 1.8 percent either voting "no," casting blank ballots or spoiling their ballot papers. Every five years, a single list of MPR candidates was returned to the legislature, with unanimous or near-unanimous support. All of these candidates were effectively handpicked by Mobutu.

In 1975, formal elections were dispensed with altogether. Instead, the MPR list was approved by acclamation; candidates were simply brought out at stadiums and other public places and cheered by the audiences.

For all intents and purposes, the MPR and the government were one. This effectively gave Mobutu complete political control over the country.

== Multi-party period ==
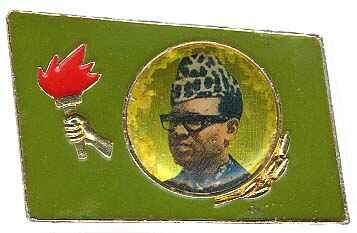
MPR party badge, c. 1990

The single-party system lasted until 24 April 1990, the date of the proclamation of the Third Republic. On that date, Mobutu said that three political parties would be allowed. The "moderate" and "hardline" factions of the MPR would form separate parties, while the third party would be the Union for Democracy and Social Progress (UDPS). Under the new multiparty system, Mobutu said that he would be above political parties, and accordingly he resigned as the president of the MPR on the same date, although he again accepted the post of party president a year later, on 21 April 1991.

The party had no real ideology other than support for Mobutu. As such, it quickly declined when Mobutu was overthrown by Laurent-Désiré Kabila in 1997, during the First Congo War. However, its legacy and symbolism were continued by smaller parties in the modern-day DR Congo. These included the Union of Mobutist Democrats (UDEMO), a Mobutist political party in parliament led by Nzanga Mobutu, the son of Mobutu Sese Seko; and the MPR-Fait privé under Cathérine Marthe Nzuzi wa Mbombo.

== Election results ==
=== Presidential elections ===
Election	Party candidate	Votes	%	Result
1970	Mobutu Sese Seko	10,131,669	100%	Elected ✓
1977	Mobutu Sese Seko	10,693,804	98.2%	Elected ✓
1984	Mobutu Sese Seko	14,885,997	99.1%	Elected ✓

=== Parliamentary elections ===
Election	Party leader	Votes	%	Seats	+/–	Position	Result
1970	Mobutu Sese Seko	9,691,132	99%	420 / 420	▲420	▲1st	Sole legal party
1975	Mobutu Sese Seko	Approved by acclamation		244 / 244	▼176	1st	Sole legal party
1977	Mobutu Sese Seko	10,180,685	100%	289 / 289	▲45	1st	Sole legal party
1982	Mobutu Sese Seko			310 / 310	▲21	1st	Sole legal party
1987	Mobutu Sese Seko			210 / 210	▼100	1st	Sole legal party
