= Authenticité (Zaire) =

Official state ideology initiated in the former Republic of Zaire

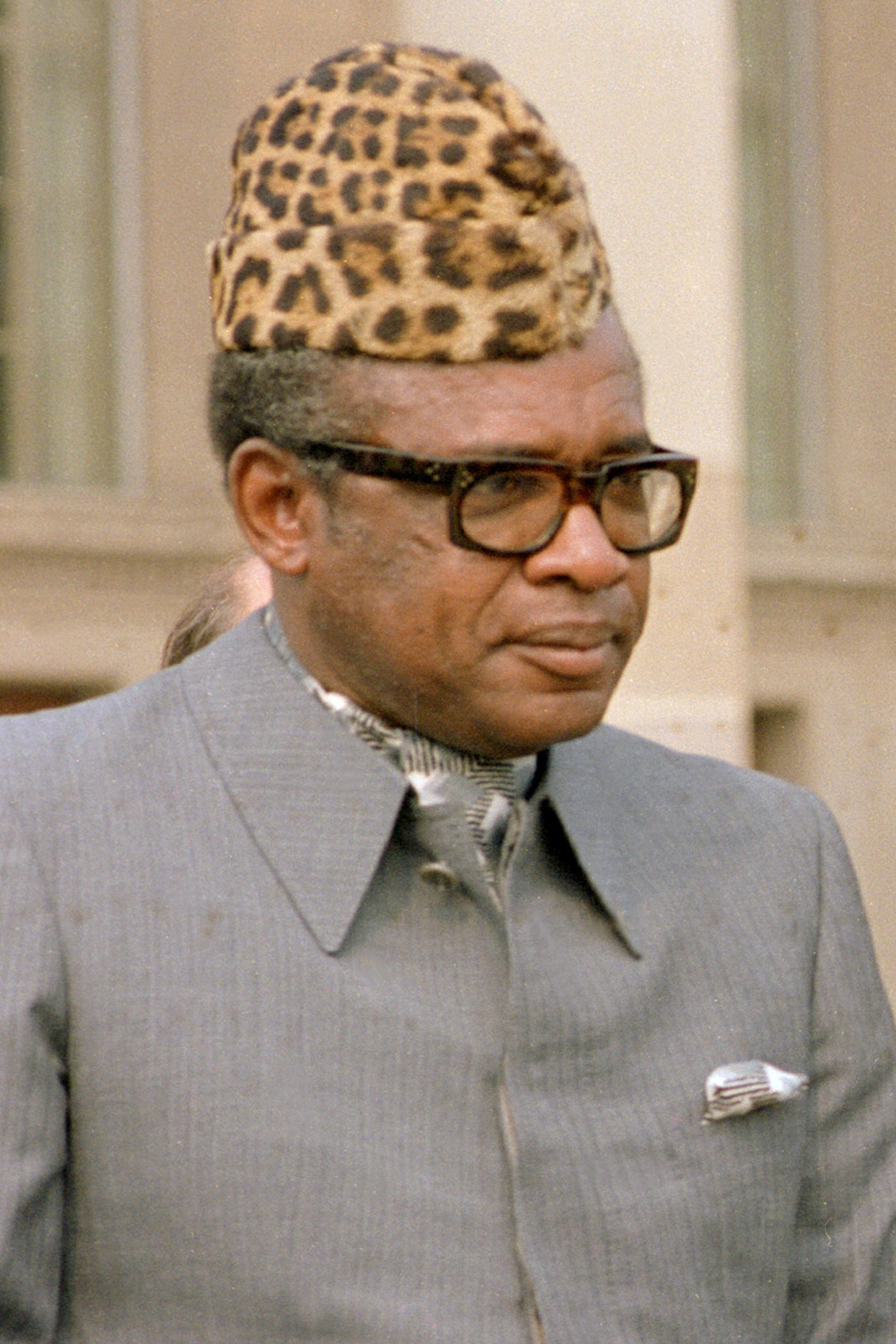
Mobutu Sese Seko sporting a typical abacost in 1983.

Authenticité, (Note: Translated literally from French as 'authenticity', but can also be interpreted as 'sincerity' and 'genuineness' (pronounced [otɑ̃tisite]).) sometimes Zairisation or Zairianisation in English, was an official state ideology of the regime of Mobutu Sese Seko that originated in the late 1960s and early 1970s in what was first the Democratic Republic of Congo, later renamed Zaire. The authenticity campaign was an effort to rid the country of the lingering vestiges of colonialism and the continuing influence of Western culture and to create a more centralized and singular national identity.

The policy, as implemented, included numerous changes to the state, and to private life, including the renaming of the Congo, and its cities, as well as an eventual mandate that Zairians were to abandon their Christian names for more "authentic" ones. In addition, Western-style attire was banned and replaced with the Mao-style tunic labeled the "abacost" and its female equivalent. The policy began to wane in the late 1970s and had mostly been abandoned by 1990. It was formally abolished by President Laurent Kabila, in 1997, after the end of Zaire.

== Origin and general ideology ==
Not long after Mobutu Sese Seko's declaration of the beginning of the Second Republic, following his successful coup against the failing democratic government of President Joseph Kasa-Vubu, he declared his new nationalistic ideology in the Manifesto of N'sele of May 1967. Over the next several years, Mobutu gradually instituted the policy measures that would come to define the campaign. More than anything, the retour à l’authenticité ('return to authenticity') was an effort on behalf of the self-declared "father of the nation" to create a national identity that could take precedence over regionalism, and tribalism, while reconciling those claims with the exigencies of modernization. He described the ideology as follows:

Authenticité has made us discover our personality by reaching into the depths of our past for the rich cultural heritage left to us by our ancestors. We have no intention of blindly returning to all ancestral customs; rather, we would like to choose those that adapt themselves well to modern life, those that encourage progress, and those that create a way of life and thought that are essentially ours.

Zairian party theorist, Kangafu-Kutumbagana, described authenticité as "a metaphysical and abstract concept...not a dogma or a religion, but a manner of action...It leads away from borrowed ideas and aspirations towards an increased consciousness of indigenous cultural values."

Though continually glorified by Mobutu and his statesmen, the authenticity campaign was the means through which the dictator intended to vindicate his own brand of leadership. He attempted to link his ideology and his political dominance before proclaiming authenticité, by saying: "in our African tradition there are never two chiefs... That is why we Congolese, in the desire to conform to the traditions of our continent, have resolved to group all the energies of the citizens of our country under the banner of a single national party", despite the necessity of a lessening of tribal identity, in order to promote national unity.

== Renaming ==
=== The "Three Zs" ===
The most widely recognized result of authenticité was the renaming of the nation from the Democratic Republic of the Congo to Zaire, a Portuguese mispronunciation of the Kikongo word nzere or nzadi, which translates as "the river that swallows all rivers".

A biography about Mobutu by Le Monde journalist Jean-Pierre Langellier, however, traces the naming of the currency zaire back to a dinner, in June 1967, attended by Mobutu's economic adviser Jacques de Groote, the governor of the Central Bank Albert Ndele, and Belgian historian Jan Vansina; where the latter came up with the name as it believably designates, in different local languages including Kikongo, the "river which swallows all rivers".

Four years later, Mobutu also renamed the country, and the Congo River, "Zaire". He referred to them as "Les trois Z—notre pays, notre fleuve, notre monnaie" ("The three Zs: our country, our river, our money").

=== Place names ===
In addition, cities and provinces were renamed. For example, Léopoldville was renamed as Kinshasa, while Katanga Province became Shaba. Streets, bridges, and other geographic features, as well as the armed forces, received name changes.

=== Personal names ===
Zaireans were required to drop their Western or Christian names, often those of European saints, in favor of authentic "Zairean" names. Mobutu changed his own name from "Joseph-Désiré Mobutu" to "Mobutu Sese Seko Kuku Ngbendu Wa Za Banga" (more commonly abbreviated to "Mobutu Sese Seko").

== Dress code ==
A result of Mobutu’s 1973 visit to Beijing, Zairian males were strongly urged, and then required, to abandon Western suits and ties for the Mao-style tunic that he named the "abacost", a word derived from the pronunciation of the French à bas le costume ("down with the suit"). A female equivalent of the national attire was also created.

== Church ==
The Catholic hierarchy quickly came to view the retour à l'authenticité as a threat to Christianity in Zaire At that time, almost half of the population was Catholic. The regime's stress on "mental decolonization" and "cultural disalienation" could be interpreted as an attack on Christianity as a product of Western influence, as could the emphasis on African culture as an alternative to widespread continuing Westernization. The banning of Christian names was a measure that particularly offended the church.

As part of his re-organization of Zairian life, Mobutu banned all outside Christian religious groups, requiring those who would function in Zaire to become part of one of four recognized umbrella groups. The four were: the Kimbanguist Church (a syncretic church of Zairian origin), the Catholic Church, the Eastern Orthodox Churches, and Les Églises du Christ au Zaire (ECZ, now Church of Christ in Congo), which covered most of the Protestant confessions. All others were declared illegal. The various Protestant churches had to affiliate with the last of these as communities within the ECZ in Zaire. At the time there were numerous local sects and church groups which had sprung up, and it is believed Mobutu wanted to control these, as well as the churches in general.

== Other ==
Under the state and party ideology of authenticity, all citizens were equal and the appropriate term of address among all Zairians became citoyen, or 'citizen'. The term was mandated for public use in order to do away with the perceived hierarchical distinctions of monsieur and madame. Visiting heads of state were greeted with African drumming and singing as opposed to the 21-gun salute, traditional in Western practice.

The state urged that all traditional works of art be returned to the country, to inspire Zairian artists, and ensure the incorporation of traditional styles into contemporary artwork.

== Decline ==
Although many of the changes instituted as part of authenticité lasted nearly to the end of the Mobutu regime, or beyond it, the ideology began to wane by the late 1970s, as it could do little more to benefit Mobutu's kleptocratic regime. Mobutu's announcement of the transition to the Third Republic in 1990, which included, most notably, a three-party system, came with the freedom to return to more universal forms of address, and to wear a suit and tie. Also, by the 1990s many Zairians had resumed use of their given names. After Mobutu was forced to flee the country in the First Congo War in 1997, President Laurent Kabila officially abolished Zaire's authenticité policy and renamed the country back to the Democratic Republic of the Congo.

== See also ==
- Decolonisation of Africa
- Authenticité (Chad)
