= Zaire =

Country in Central Africa (1965–1997)

Democratic Republic of the Congo (1965–1971) République démocratique du Congo (French) Republic of Zaire (1971–1997) République du Zaïre (French)
- 1965–1997
- Flag (from 1971) Emblem
- Motto: Paix — Justice — Travail "Peace — Justice — Work"
- Anthem: La Zaïroise "The Zairian"
- Capital and largest city: Kinshasa (named "Léopoldville" until 1966); 4°19′S 15°19′E
- Official languages: French
- Recognised national languages: Lingala · Kikongo ya leta (Note: The term "Kikongo" in the Constitution was actually referring to the Kituba language – which is known as Kikongo ya leta by its speakers – not the Kongo language proper. The confusion arose from the fact that the government of the Zaire officially recognised and referred to the language simply as "Kikongo".) · Swahili · Tshiluba
- Ethnic groups: See Ethnic groups section below
- Religion (1986): 50% Roman Catholic; 20% Protestant; 10% Kimbanguism; 10% Islam; 10% Others (Baluba, Bantu)
- Demonyms: Léopoldville-Congolese (1965–1966); Kinshasa-Congolese (1966–1971); Zairian (1971–1997)
- Government: 1965–1990: Unitary Mobutist one-party (Note: Zaire became a de jure one-party state on 23 December 1970, but had been a de facto one-party state since 20 May 1967, the date on which the MPR (Mouvement Populaire de la Revolution) was established. Zaire formally adopted a multiparty system on 24 April 1990, when Mobutu delivered a speech proclaiming the end of the one-party system. The country adopted a three-party system de jure with the enactment of Law No. 90-002 of 5 July 1990, which amended its constitution accordingly, but retained the one-party system of the MPR de facto.) presidential republic · under an authoritarian military dictatorship (1965–1974; 1980–1990) ·under a totalitarian military dictatorship (1974–1980); 1990–1997: Unitary presidential republic (Note: Zaire became a de jure one-party state on 23 December 1970, but had been a de facto one-party state since 20 May 1967, the date on which the MPR (Mouvement Populaire de la Revolution) was established. Zaire formally adopted a multiparty system on 24 April 1990, when Mobutu delivered a speech proclaiming the end of the one-party system. The country adopted a three-party system de jure with the enactment of Law No. 90-002 of 5 July 1990, which amended its constitution accordingly, but retained the one-party system of the MPR de facto.)
- President
  - 1965–1997: Mobutu Sese Seko
- Prime Minister
  - 1965–1966: Léonard Mulamba (first)
  - 1977–1979: Mpinga Kasenda (second)
  - 1997: Likulia Bolongo (last)
- Legislature: Legislative Council
- Historical era: Cold War, post-Cold War era
  - Coup d'état: 24 November 1965
  - Constitution promulgated: 15 August 1974
  - Mobutu overthrown: 17 May 1997
  - Death of Mobutu: 7 September 1997

Area
  - Total: 2,345,409 km^{2} (905,567 sq mi)
  - Water (%): 3.32

Population
  - 1971: 18,400,000
  - 1997: 46,498,539
- GDP (nominal): 1983 estimate
  - Total: ▲$4.5 billion
- HDI (1990 formula): 0.294 low
- Currency: Congolese franc (1965–1967); Zaïre (1967–1997) (ZRN)
- Time zone: UTC+1 to +2 (WAT and CAT)
- Calling code: +243
- ISO 3166 code: ZR
- Internet TLD: .zr
Preceded by	Succeeded by
First Congolese Republic	Third Congolese Republic
- Today part of: Democratic Republic of the Congo

Zaire (spelt Zaïre in French, and sometimes in English), (Note: UK: /zaɪˈɪər/, US: /zɑːˈɪər/) officially the Democratic Republic of the Congo (Note: French: République démocratique du Congo, French pronunciation: [ʁepyblik demɔkʁatik dy kɔŋɡo]) from 1965 to 1971 and the Republic of Zaire (Note: French: République du Zaïre [ʁepyblik dy zaiʁ]) from 1971 to 1997, was the Congolese state in Central Africa under a regime headed by Mobutu Sese Seko from 1965 to 1997. It was, by area, the third-largest country in Africa after Sudan and Algeria, and the 11th-largest country in the world from 1965 to 1991. With a population of over 23 million, Zaire was the most populous Francophone country in Africa. Zaire was strategically important to the West during the Cold War, particularly the U.S., as a counterbalance to Soviet influence in Africa. The U.S. and its allies supported the Mobutu regime with military and economic aid to prevent the spread of communism which made it a key player for U.S. involvement in Africa.

The country was a one-party authoritarian (and, in 1974–1980, totalitarian) military dictatorship, run by Mobutu Sese Seko and his Popular Movement of the Revolution. Mobutu seized power in a military coup in 1965, after five years of political upheaval following independence from Belgium known as the Congo Crisis. Zaire had a strongly centralist constitution, and foreign assets were nationalised. The period is sometimes referred to as the Second Congolese Republic until 1990 and the Third Congolese Republic from 1990 onwards.

A wider campaign of authenticité, ridding the country of the influences from the colonial era of the Belgian Congo, was also launched under Mobutu's direction. Weakened by the termination of American support after the end of the Cold War, Mobutu was forced to declare a new republic in 1990 to cope with demands for change, allowed multi-party system, but the country became an unstable hybrid regime. By the time of its downfall, Zaire was characterised by widespread cronyism, corruption and economic mismanagement.

Zaire collapsed in the 1990s, amid the destabilisation of the eastern parts of the country in the aftermath of the Rwandan genocide and growing ethnic violence. In 1996, Laurent-Désiré Kabila, the head of the AFDL militia, led a popular rebellion against Mobutu. With rebel forces making gains westward, Mobutu fled the country, leaving Kabila's forces in charge. In 1997, the country's name was restored to the Democratic Republic of the Congo; Mobutu died less than four months later while in exile in Morocco.

== Etymology ==
The country's name, Zaïre, was derived from the name of the Congo River, sometimes called Zaire in Portuguese, which in turn was derived from the Kikongo nzere o zadi ('river that swallows rivers'). The use of Congo seems to have replaced Zaire gradually in English usage during the 18th century and Congo was the preferred English name in 19th-century literature, although references to Zahir or Zaire as the name used by the local population (i.e. derived from Portuguese usage) remained common.

== History ==
=== Mobutu ===
In 1965, as in 1960, the division of power in Congo-Léopoldville (a former Belgian colony) between President and Parliament led to a stalemate and threatened the country's stability. Joseph-Désiré Mobutu again seized power. Unlike the first time, however, Mobutu assumed the presidency, rather than remaining behind the scenes. From 1965, Mobutu dominated the political life of the country, restructuring the state on more than one occasion, and claiming the title of "Father of the Nation". He announced the renaming of the country as the Republic of Zaire on 27 October 1971.

When, under the authenticité policy of the early 1970s, Zairians were obliged to adopt "authentic" African names rather than European monikers, Mobutu dropped Joseph-Désiré and officially changed his name to Mobutu Sese Seko Kuku Ngbendu Wa Za Banga, or, more commonly, Mobutu Sésé Seko, roughly meaning "the all-conquering warrior, who goes from triumph to triumph".

In retrospective justification of his 1965 seizure of power, Mobutu later summed up the record of the First Republic as one of "chaos, disorder, negligence, and incompetence". Rejection of the legacy of the First Republic went far beyond rhetoric. In the first two years of its existence, the new regime turned to the urgent tasks of political reconstruction and consolidation. Creating a new basis of legitimacy for the state, in the form of a single party, came next in Mobutu's order of priority.

A third imperative was to expand the reach of the state in the social and political realms, a process that began in 1970 and culminated in the adoption of a new constitution in 1974. By 1976, however, this effort had begun to generate its own inner contradictions, thus paving the way for the resurrection of a Bula Matari ("the breaker of rocks") system of repression and brutality.

=== Constitutional changes ===
By 1967, Mobutu had consolidated his rule and proceeded to give the country a new constitution and a single party. The new constitution was submitted to popular referendum in June 1967 and approved by 98 per cent of those voting. It provided that executive powers be centralised in the president, who was to be head of state, head of government, commander in chief of the armed forces and the police, and in charge of foreign policy.

But the most far-reaching change was the creation of the Popular Movement of the Revolution (Mouvement Populaire de la Révolution—MPR) on 17 April 1967, marking the emergence of "the nation politically organised". Rather than government institutions being the emanation of the state, the state was henceforth defined as the emanation of the party. Thus, in October 1967, party and administrative responsibilities were merged into a single framework, thereby automatically extending the role of the party to all administrative organs at the central and provincial levels, as well as to the trade unions, youth movements, and student organisations.

Three years after changing the country's name to Zaire, Mobutu promulgated a new constitution that consolidated his hold on the country. Every five years (seven years after 1978), the MPR elected a president who was simultaneously nominated as the only candidate for president of the republic; he was confirmed in office via a referendum. Under this system, Mobutu was reelected in 1977 and 1984 by implausibly high margins, claiming a unanimous or near-unanimous "yes" vote. The MPR was defined as the country's "single institution," and its president was vested with "plentitude of power exercise." Every five years, a single list of MPR candidates was returned to the National Assembly, with official figures showing near-unanimous support. All citizens of Zaire automatically became members of the MPR at birth. For all intents and purposes, this gave the president of the MPR—Mobutu—complete political control over the country.

=== Totalitarian expansion ===
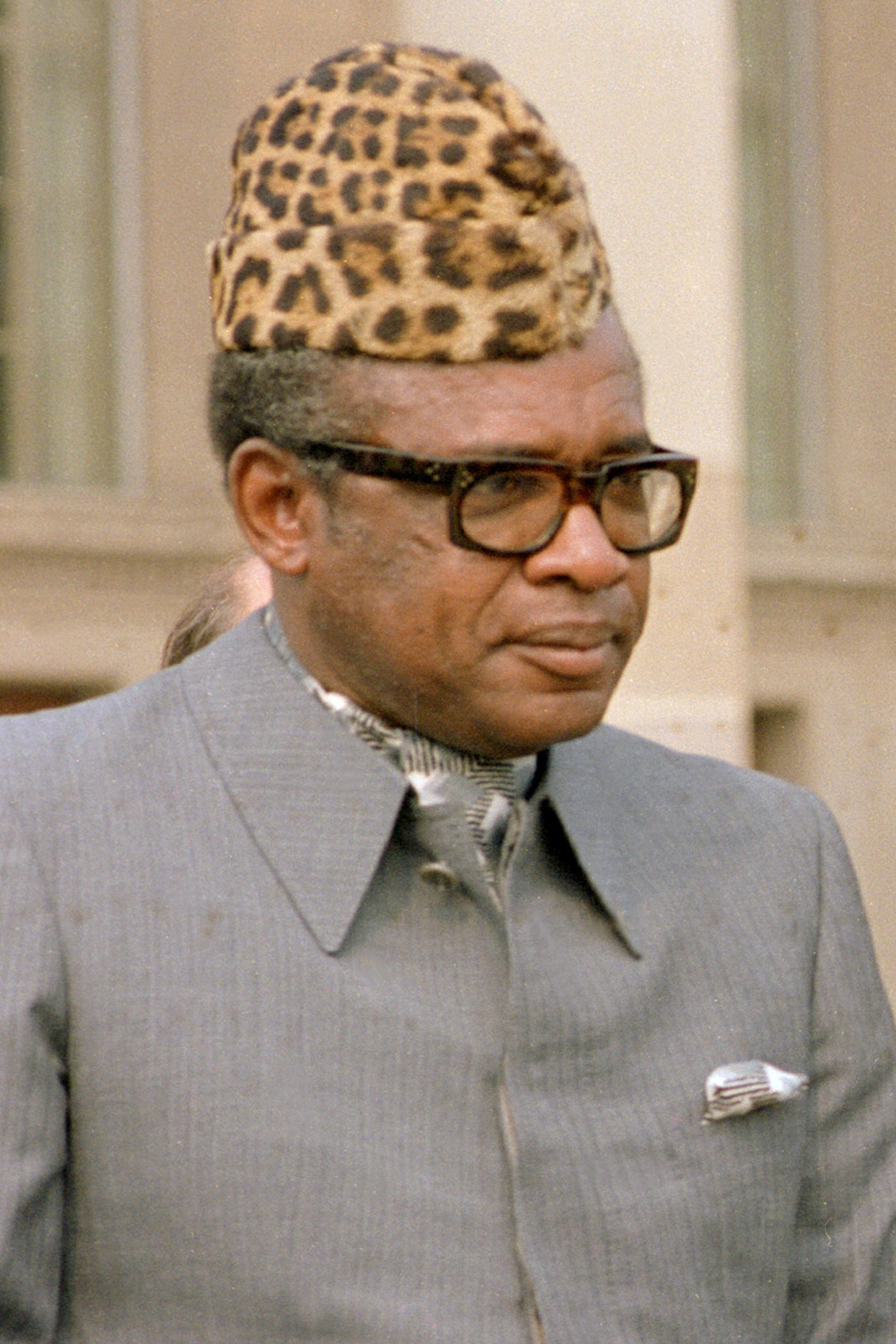
Mobutu Sese Seko, the president of Zaire from 1965 to 1997

Translating the concept of "the nation politically organised" into reality implied a major expansion of state control of civil society. It meant, to begin with, the incorporation of youth groups and worker organisations into the matrix of the MPR. In July 1967, the Political Bureau announced the creation of the Youth of the Popular Revolutionary Movement (Jeunesse du Mouvement Populaire de la Révolution—JMPR), following the launching a month earlier of the National Union of Zairian Workers (Union Nationale des Travailleurs Zaïrois—UNTZA), which brought together into a single organisational framework three preexisting trade unions.

Ostensibly, the aim of the merger, in the terms of the Manifesto of N'Sele, was to transform the role of trade unions from "being merely a force of confrontation" into "an organ of support for government policy", thus providing "a communication link between the working class and the state". Similarly, the JMPR was to act as a major link between the student population and the state. In reality, the government was attempting to bring under its control those sectors where opposition to the regime might be centred. By appointing key labour and youth leaders to the MPR Political Bureau, the regime hoped to harness syndical and student forces to the machinery of the state. Nevertheless, as has been pointed out by numerous observers, there is little evidence that co-optation succeeded in mobilising support for the regime beyond the most superficial level.

The trend toward co-optation of key social sectors continued in subsequent years. Women's associations were eventually brought under the control of the party, as was the press, and in December 1971 Mobutu proceeded to emasculate the power of the churches. From then on, only three churches were recognised: the Church of Christ in Zaire (L'Église du Christ au Zaïre), the Kimbanguist Church, and the Roman Catholic Church.

Nationalisation of the universities of Kinshasa and Kisangani, coupled with Mobutu's insistence on banning all Christian names and establishing JMPR sections in all seminaries, soon brought the Roman Catholic Church and the state into conflict. Not until 1975, and after considerable pressure from the Vatican, did the regime agree to tone down its attacks on the Roman Catholic Church and return some of its control of the school system to the church. Meanwhile, in line with a December 1971 law, which allowed the state to dissolve "any church or sect that compromises or threatens to compromise public order", scores of unrecognised religious sects were dissolved and their leaders jailed.

Mobutu was careful also to suppress all institutions that could mobilise ethnic loyalties. Avowedly opposed to ethnicity as a basis for political alignment, he outlawed such ethnic associations as the Association of Lulua Brothers (Association des Lulua Frères), which had been organised in Kasai in 1953 in reaction to the growing political and economic influence in Kasai of the rival Luba people, and Liboke lya Bangala (literally, "a bundle of Bangala"), an association formed in the 1950s to represent the interests of Lingala speakers in large cities. It helped Mobutu that his ethnic affiliation was blurred in the public mind. Nevertheless, as dissatisfaction arose, ethnic tensions surfaced again.

==== Centralisation of power ====
Running parallel to the efforts of the state to control all autonomous sources of power, important administrative reforms were introduced in 1967 and 1973 to strengthen the hand of the central authorities in the provinces. The central objective of the 1967 reform was to abolish provincial governments and replace them with state functionaries appointed by Kinshasa. The principle of centralisation was further extended to districts and territories, each headed by administrators appointed by the central government.

The only units of government that still retained a fair measure of autonomy—but not for long—were the so-called local collectivities, i.e. chiefdoms and sectors (the latter incorporating several chiefdoms). From July 1972, provinces were called regions.

With the January 1973 reform, another major step was taken in the direction of further centralisation. The aim, in essence, was to operate a complete fusion of political and administrative hierarchies by making the head of each administrative unit the president of the local party committee. Furthermore, another consequence of the reform was to severely curtail the power of traditional authorities at the local level. Hereditary claims to authority would no longer be recognised; instead, all chiefs were to be appointed and controlled by the state via the administrative hierarchy. By then, the process of centralisation had theoretically eliminated all preexisting centres of local autonomy.

In 1973, "obligatory civic work" (locally known as salongo after the Lingala term for work) was introduced, in the form of one afternoon a week of compulsory labour on agricultural and development projects. Officially described as a revolutionary attempt to return to the values of communalism and solidarity inherent in the traditional society, salongo was intended to mobilise the population into the performance of collective work "with enthusiasm and without constraint".

However, the conspicuous lack of popular enthusiasm for salongo led to widespread resistance and foot dragging causing many local administrators to look the other way. Although failure to comply carried penalties of one month to six months in jail, by the late 1970s most Zairians shirked their salongo obligations.

=== Growing conflict ===
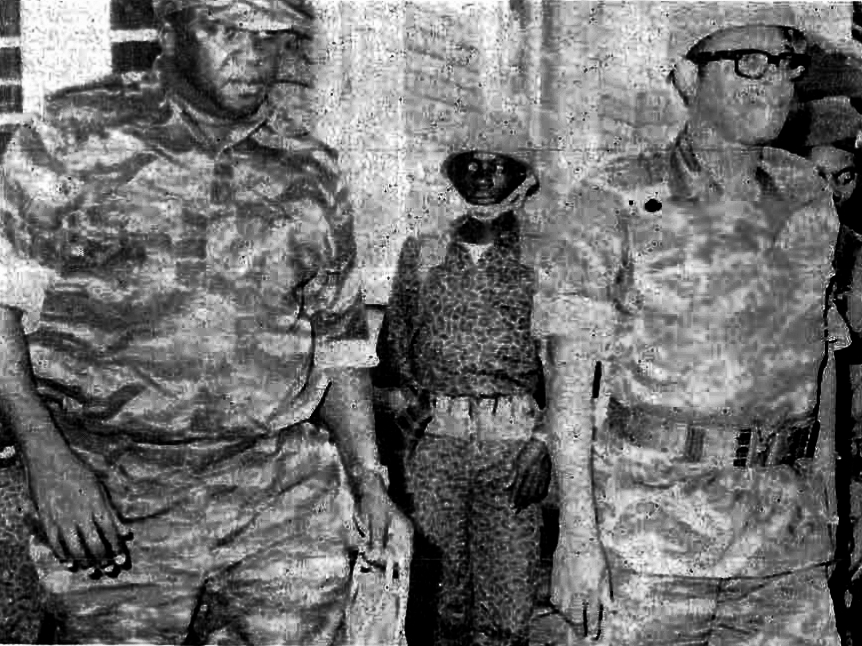
Idi Amin, president of Uganda, visiting Mobutu in Zaire during the Shaba I Conflict in 1977

In 1977 and 1978, Katangan rebels based in Angola launched two invasions, Shaba I and Shaba II, into the Katanga Province (renamed "Shaba" in 1972). The rebels were driven out with military assistance from the Western Bloc, particularly from the Safari Club.

The Battle of Kolwezi, fought in May 1978, resulted in an airborne operation in an aim of rescuing Zairian, Belgian and French miners held as hostages by pro-Communist Katangan guerrillas.

Pope John Paul II made a papal trip to Zaire on 2 May 1980, on the centenary of Catholic evangelisation. During his tour, he greeted over a million people, making him the first pontiff to visit Africa as a "messenger of peace". He left Zaire four days later on 6 May shortly after 9 people were trampled to death trying to attend mass.

In 1981, despite slow progress, Zaire launched an economic reform to revive its economy in order to keep up its rescheduled payment on the country's tremendous debt of $4.4 billion, which had recorded a small rate of economic growth in the last three quarters of 1980.

During the 1980s, Zaire remained a one-party state. Although Mobutu maintained control during this period, opposition parties, most notably the Union for Democracy and Social Progress (Union pour la Démocratie et le Progrès Social—UDPS), were active. Mobutu's attempts to quell these groups drew significant international criticism.

As the Cold War came to a close, internal and external pressures on Mobutu increased. In late 1989 and early 1990, Mobutu was weakened by a series of domestic protests, by heightened international criticism of his regime's human rights practices, by a faltering economy, and by government corruption, most notably his massive embezzlement of government funds for personal use. In June 1989, Mobutu visited Washington, D.C., where he was the first African head of state to be invited for a state meeting with newly elected U.S. President George H. W. Bush.

In May 1990, Mobutu agreed to the principle of a multi-party system with elections and a constitution. As details of a reform package were delayed, soldiers began looting Kinshasa in September 1991 to protest their unpaid wages. Two thousand French and Belgian troops, some of whom were flown in on U.S. Air Force planes, arrived to evacuate the 20,000 endangered foreign nationals in Kinshasa.

In 1992, after previous similar attempts, the long-promised Sovereign National Conference was staged, encompassing over 2,000 representatives from various political parties. The conference gave itself a legislative mandate and elected Archbishop Laurent Monsengwo Pasinya as its chairman, along with Étienne Tshisekedi wa Mulumba, leader of the UDPS, as prime minister. By the end of the year Mobutu had created a rival government with its own prime minister. The ensuing stalemate produced a compromise merger of the two governments into the High Council of Republic–Parliament of Transition (HCR–PT) in 1994, with Mobutu as head of state and Kengo wa Dondo as prime minister. Although presidential and legislative elections were scheduled repeatedly over the next 2 years, they never took place.

=== First Congo War and demise of Zaire ===
By 1996, tensions from the neighbouring Rwandan Civil War and genocide had spilled over to Zaire (see History of Rwanda). Rwandan Hutu militia forces (Interahamwe), who had fled Rwanda following the ascension of an RPF-led government, had been using Hutu refugee camps in eastern Zaire as bases for incursion against Rwanda. These Hutu militia forces soon allied with the Zairian armed forces (FAZ) to launch a campaign against Congolese ethnic Tutsis in eastern Zaire, known as the Banyamulenge. In turn, these Zairian Tutsis formed a militia to defend themselves against attacks. When the Zairian government began to escalate its massacres in November 1996, the Tutsi militias erupted in rebellion against Mobutu, triggering the First Congo War.

The Tutsi militia was soon joined by various opposition groups and supported by several countries, including Rwanda and Uganda. This coalition, led by Laurent-Désiré Kabila, became known as the Alliance des Forces Démocratiques pour la Libération du Congo-Zaïre (AFDL). The AFDL, now seeking the broader goal of ousting Mobutu, made significant military gains in early 1997, and by the middle of 1997 had almost completely overrun the country. The only thing that seemed to slow the AFDL forces down was the country's ramshackle infrastructure; irregularly used dirt paths and river ports were all that connected some areas to the outside world. Following failed peace talks between Mobutu and Kabila, Mobutu fled into exile in Morocco on 17 May. Kabila named himself president, consolidated power around himself and the AFDL, and marched unopposed into Kinshasa three days later. On 21 May, Kabila officially reverted the name of the country to the Democratic Republic of the Congo.

=== Legacy ===
After the collapse of Zaire, its legacy was claimed and partially continued by various factions which emerged from Mobutu's former supporter and loyalist network. These factions were headed by former "barons" of the regime as well as Mobutu's family members, and included political parties such as the Union of Mobutist Democrats and the MPR-Fait privé. Several of these groups continued to use Zaire's symbols and invoke its traditions. In 2024, opposition politician Christian Malanga led a coup attempt against the Congolese government in the name of his self-proclaimed "New Zaire", raising the old flag of Zaire in Kinshasa. The coup attempt was defeated, and Malanga was killed.

== Geography ==
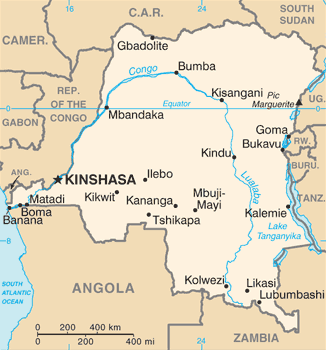
A map of Zaire

A Köppen climate classification map of Zaire

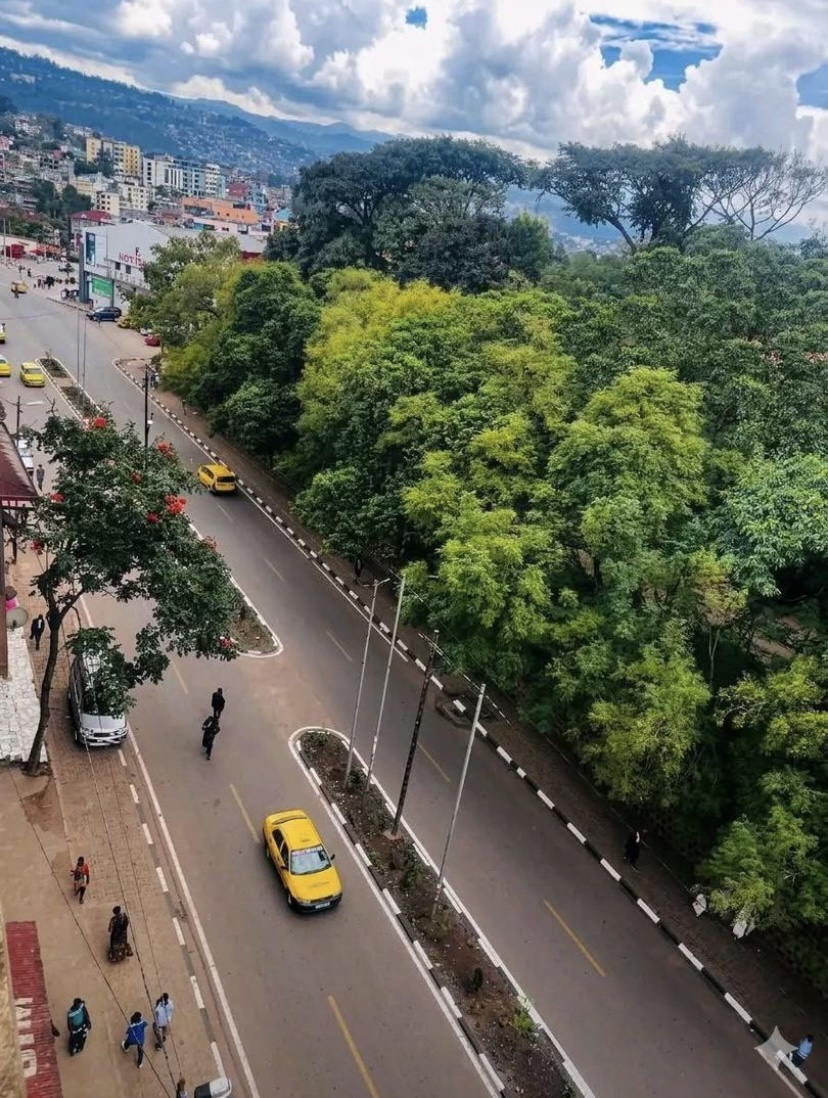
Bukavu, the capital of South Kivu province

Zaire was located in central sub-Saharan Africa, bordered to the northwest by the Congo-Brazzaville, to the north by the Central African Republic, to the northeast by Sudan, to the east by Uganda, Rwanda and Burundi, and by Tanzania (across Lake Tanganyika), to the south and southeast by Zambia, to the southwest by Angola, and to the west by the South Atlantic Ocean and the Cabinda exclave of Angola. Zaire lied between latitudes 6°N and 14°S, and longitudes 12°E and 32°E. It straddles the Equator, with one-third to the north and two-thirds to the south. With an area of 2,345,408 square kilometres (905,567 sq mi), it was the third-largest country in Africa by area, after Algeria and Sudan.

As a result of its equatorial location, the Zaire had high precipitation and has the highest frequency of thunderstorms in the world. The annual rainfall can total upwards of 2,000 millimetres (80 in) in some places. It also sustains the Congo rainforest, the second-largest rainforest in the world after the Amazon rainforest. This massive expanse of lush jungle covers most of the vast, low-lying central basin of the river, which slopes toward the Atlantic Ocean in the west. This area was surrounded by plateaus merging into savannas in the south and southwest, by mountainous terraces in the west, and dense grasslands extending beyond the Congo River in the north. The glaciated Rwenzori Mountains are found in the extreme eastern region.

The tropical climate produced the Congo River system which dominates the region topographically along with the rainforest it flows through. The Congo Basin occupies nearly the entire country and an area of nearly 1,000,000 km^{2} (390,000 sq mi). The river and its tributaries form the backbone of Congolese economics and transportation. Major tributaries include the Kasai, Sangha, Ubangi, Ruzizi, Aruwimi, and Lulonga.

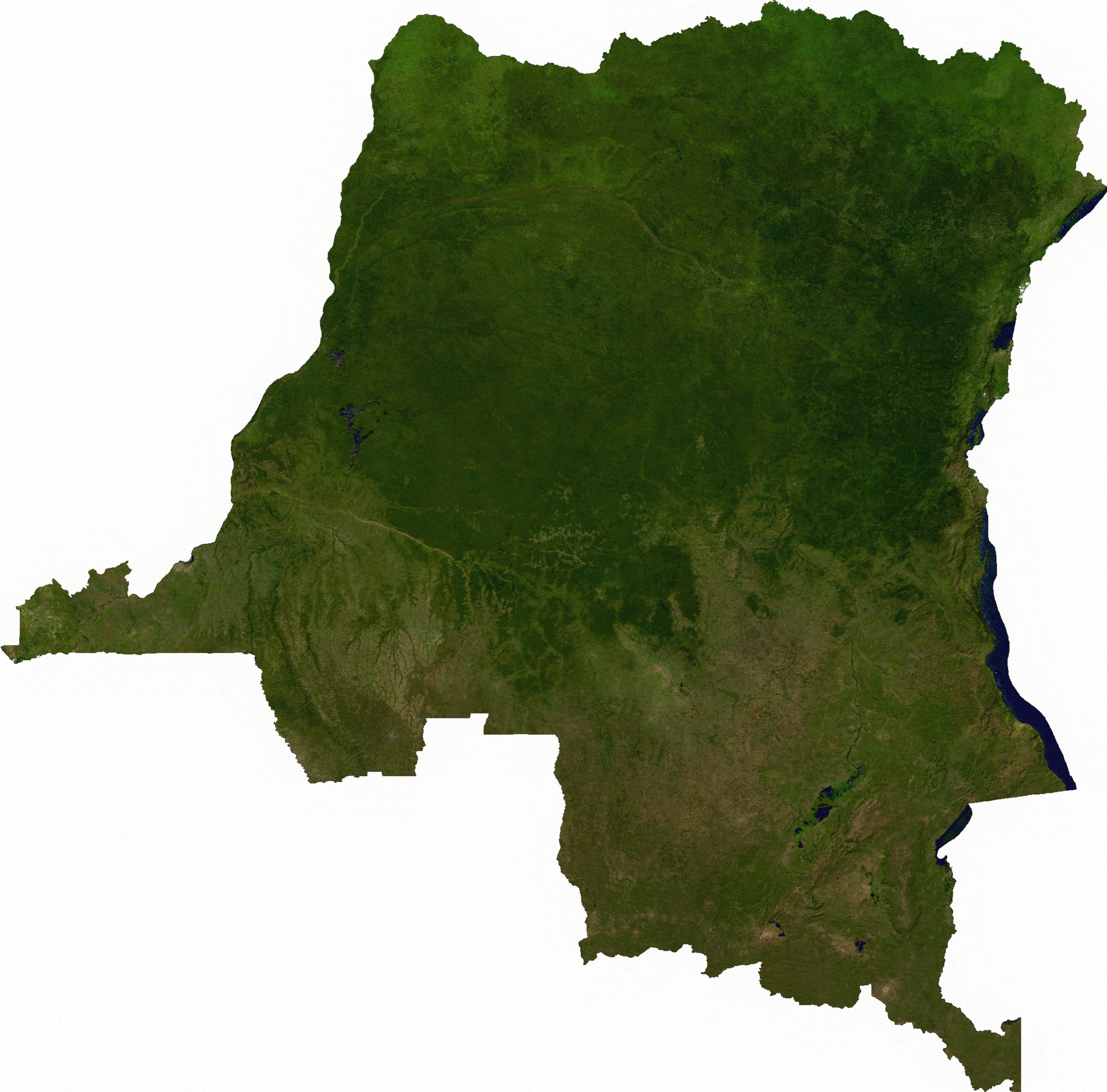
A satellite image of Zaire

The Congo River had the second-largest flow and the second-largest watershed of any river in the world, behind the Amazon in both respects. The sources of the Congo River are in the Albertine Rift Mountains that flank the western branch of the East African Rift, as well as Lake Tanganyika and Lake Mweru. The river flows generally west from Kisangani just below Boyoma Falls, then gradually bends southwest, passing by Mbandaka, joining with the Ubangi River, and running into the Pool Malebo (Stanley Pool). Kinshasa and Brazzaville are on opposite sides of the river at the Pool. Then the river narrows and falls through a number of cataracts in deep canyons, collectively known as the Livingstone Falls, and runs past Boma into the Atlantic Ocean. The river and a 37-kilometre-wide (23 mi) strip of coastline on its north bank provide the country's only outlet to the Atlantic.

The Albertine Rift played a key role in shaping the Congo's geography. The northeastern section of the country much more mountainous. Tectonic movement results in volcanic activity, occasionally with loss of life. The geologic activity in this area created the African Great Lakes, four of which lie on the Congo's eastern frontier: Lake Albert, Lake Kivu, Lake Edward, and Lake Tanganyika.

The rift valley has exposed an enormous amount of mineral wealth throughout the south and east of the Congo, making it accessible to mining. Cobalt, copper, cadmium, industrial and gem-quality diamonds, gold, silver, zinc, manganese, tin, germanium, uranium, radium, bauxite, iron ore, and coal are all found in plentiful supply, especially in the Congo's southeastern Katanga region.

== Government and politics ==
The country was governed by the Popular Movement of the Revolution as a unitary one-party state as the only legally permitted party in the country, though the Congo had effectively been a one-party state since the MPR's formation. Despite the constitution nominally allowing for the existence of two parties, the MPR was the only party that was allowed to nominate a candidate for the 1 November 1970 presidential election. Mobutu was confirmed in office by an implausible margin of over 10,131,000 votes against only 157 who voted "no." At parliamentary elections held two weeks later, voters were presented with a single MPR list that was approved with over 99 per cent support.

Zaire utilised a presidential system with the president served as the head of state whose role was to appoint and dismiss cabinet members and determine their areas of responsibility. The ministers, as heads of their respective departments, were to execute the programmes and decisions of the president. The president also was to have the power to appoint and dismiss the governors of the provinces and the judges of all courts, including those of the Supreme Court of Justice.

The bicameral parliament was replaced by a unicameral legislative body called the Legislative Council. Governors of provinces were no longer elected by provincial assemblies but appointed by the central government. The president had the power to issue autonomous regulations on matters other than those pertaining to the domain of law, without prejudice to other provisions of the constitution. Under certain conditions, the president was empowered to govern by executive order, which carried the force of law.

=== Mobutism ===
The doctrinal foundation was disclosed shortly after its birth, in the form of the Manifesto of N'sele, which was issued from the president's rural residence at N'sele, 60 km further up the Congo River from Kinshasa. In May 1967, it was made public. Nationalism, revolution, and authenticity were identified as the major themes of what came to be known as "Mobutism".

Nationalism implied the achievement of economic and political independence. Revolution, described as a "truly national revolution, essentially pragmatic", meant "the repudiation of both capitalism and communism". Thus, "neither right nor left" became one of the legitimising slogans of the regime, along with "authenticity".

In the 1970s and 1980s, Mobutu's government relied on a selected pool of technocrats, often referred to as the "nomenklatura", from which the Head of State drew, and periodically rotated, competent individuals. They comprised the Executive Council and led the full spectrum of Ministries, Departments or, as governmental terminology shifted, Commissariats. Among these individuals were internationally respected appointees such as Djamboleka Lona Okitongono who was named Secretary of Finance, under Citizen Namwisi (Minister of Finance), and later became President of OGEDEP, the National Debt Management Office.

Djamboleka became Governor of the Bank of Zaire in the final stage of Mobutu's government. His progress was fairly typical of the rotational pattern established by Mobutu, who retained the most sensitive ministerial portfolios (such as Defence) for himself.

=== Administrative divisions ===
Zaire was divided into 8 regions with its capital Kinshasa. In 1988, the province of Kivu was split into three regions. They were renamed into provinces in 1997.

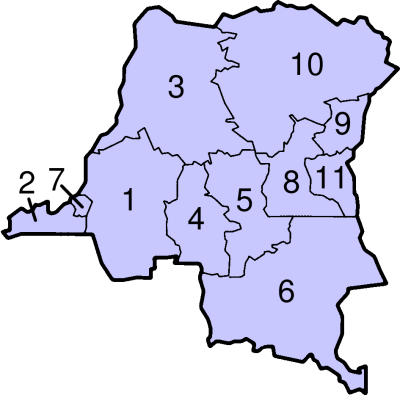
Map of Zaire's regions

1. Bandundu
2. Bas-Congo
3. Équateur
4. Kasaï-Occidental
5. Kasaï–Oriental
6. Shaba
7. Kinshasa
8. Maniema
9. North Kivu
10. Orientale
11. South Kivu

== Economy ==
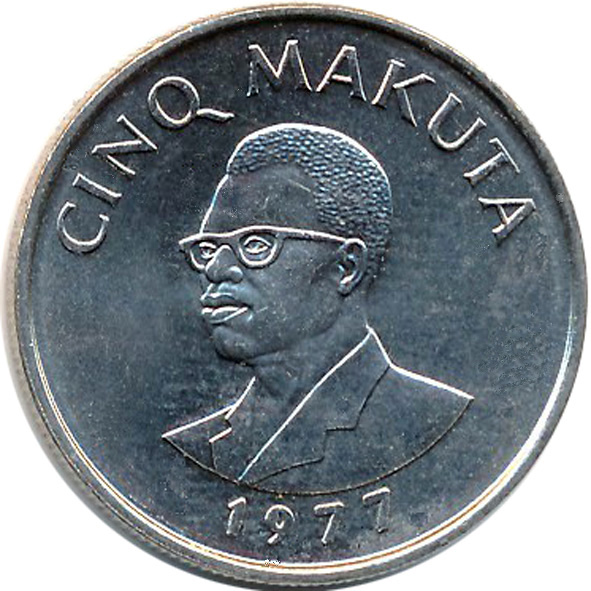
A 5 makuta coin from 1977, which portrays Mobutu Sese Seko, the president of Zaire during this time

The zaïre was introduced to replace the franc as the new national currency. 100 makuta (singular likuta) equaled one zaïre. The likuta was also divided into 100 sengi. However this unit was worth very little, so the smallest coin was for 10 Sengi. The currency and the cities named above had actually already been renamed between 1966 and 1971.

While the country began to stabilise after Mobutu took control, the economic situation began to decline, and by 1979, the purchasing power was only 4% of that in 1960. Starting in 1976 the IMF provided stabilising loans to his regime. Much of this money was embezzled by Mobutu and his circle.

According to the 1982 report by the IMF's envoy Erwin Blumenthal, it was "alarmingly clear that the corruptive system in Zaire with all its wicked and ugly manifestations, its mismanagement and fraud will destroy all endeavors of international institutions, of friendly governments, and of the commercial banks towards recovery and rehabilitation of Zaire's economy". Blumenthal stated that there was "no chance" that creditors would ever recover their loans. Yet the IMF and the World Bank continued to lend money that was either embezzled, stolen, or "wasted on elephant projects". "Structural adjustment programmes" implemented as a condition of IMF loans cut support for health care, education, and infrastructure.

== Culture ==
The concept of authenticity was derived from the MPR's professed doctrine of "authentic Zairian nationalism and condemnation of regionalism and tribalism". Mobutu defined it as being conscious of one's own personality and one's own values and of being at home in one's culture. In line with the dictates of authenticity, the name of the country was changed to the Republic of Zaire on 27 October 1971, and that of the armed forces to Zairian Armed Forces (Forces Armées Zaïroises—FAZ).

This decision was curious, given that the name Congo, which referred both to the river Congo and to the mediaeval Kongo Empire, was fundamentally authentic to pre-colonial African roots, while Zaire is in fact a Portuguese corruption of another African word, Nzadi ("river", by Nzadi o Nzere, "the river that swallows all the other rivers", another name of the Congo river). General Mobutu became Mobutu Sésé Seko and forced all his citizens to adopt African names and many cities were also renamed.

Some of the conversions are as follows:

- Léopoldville became Kinshasa
- Stanleyville became Kisangani
- Élisabethville became Lubumbashi
- Jadotville became Likasi
- Albertville became Kalemie

In addition, the adoption of Zairian, as opposed to Western or Christian, names in 1972 and the abandonment of Western dress in favour of the wearing of the abacost were subsequently promoted as expressions of authenticity.

Mobutu used the concept of authenticity as a means of vindicating his own brand of leadership. As he himself stated, "in our African tradition there are never two chiefs ... That is why we Congolese, in the desire to conform to the traditions of our continent, have resolved to group all the energies of the citizens of our country under the banner of a single national party."

Critics of the regime were quick to point out the shortcomings of Mobutism as a legitimising formula, in particular its self-serving qualities and inherent vagueness; nonetheless, the MPR's ideological training centre, the Makanda Kabobi Institute, took seriously its assigned task of propagating through the land "the teachings of the Founder-President, which must be given and interpreted in the same fashion throughout the country". Members of the MPR Political Bureau, meanwhile, were entrusted with the responsibility of serving as "the repositories and guarantors of Mobutism".

Quite aside from the merits or weaknesses of Mobutism, the MPR drew much of its legitimacy from the model of the overarching mass parties that had come into existence in Africa in the 1960s, a model which had also been a source of inspiration for the MNC-Lumumba. It was this Lumumbist heritage which the MPR tried to appropriate in its effort to mobilise the Zairian masses behind its founder-president. Intimately tied up with the doctrine of Mobutism was the vision of an all-encompassing single party reaching out to all sectors of the nation.

== Standards and abbreviations ==
Zaire's top-level domain was ".zr". It has since changed to ".cd".

Zaire's IOC code was ZAI, which the nation's athletes used at the Olympic Games and other international sporting events like the All-Africa Games. It has since changed to COD.

== Works cited ==
- Abbott, Peter (2014). Modern African Wars (4): The Congo 1960–2002. Oxford; New York City: Osprey Publishing. ISBN 978-1-78200-076-1..
- Meditz, Sandra W.; Merrill, Tim, eds. (1994). Zaire: a country study (4th ed.). Washington, D.C.: Federal Research Division, Library of Congress. ISBN 0-8444-0795-X. OCLC 30666705. This article incorporates text from this source, which is in the public domain.

== Further reading and external links ==
- Macgaffey, J., 1991. The Real Economy of Zaire: The Contribution of Smuggling and Other Unofficial Activities to National Wealth. Philadelphia: University of Pennsylvania Press.
- Callaghy, T., The State–Society Struggle: Zaire in Comparative Perspective. New York: Columbia University Press, 1984, ISBN 0-231-05720-2.
- Young, C., and Turner, T., The Rise and Decline of the Zairian State. Madison: The University of Wisconsin Press, 1985, ISBN 978-0-299-10110-7.
- Turner, Thomas (2007). The Congo Wars: Conflict, Myth and Reality. London: Palgrave Macmillan. ISBN 978-1-84277-689-6.
