= Antoine Gizenga cabinet =

Cabinet of President of the Democratic Republic of Congo

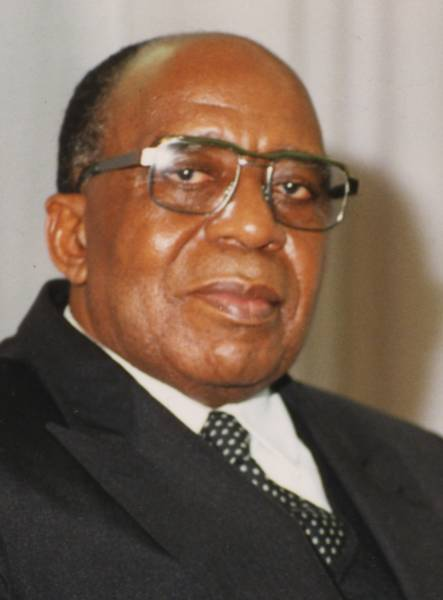
Antoine Gizenga, head of the cabinet

The Antoine Gizenga cabinet consisted of the Ministers of State, Ministers and Deputy Ministers appointed by Prime Minister Antoine Gizenga of the Democratic Republic of the Congo. Gizenga was Prime Minister from 30 December 2006 to 10 October 2008. His first cabinet was appointed on 5 February 2007, with 59 members. A new government was announced on 25 November 2007, with its size reduced to 44 ministers.

== First cabinet ==
The Ministers of State and Ministers appointed on 5 February 2007 were:

=== Ministers of State ===
Position	Officeholder
Minister of State for Agriculture	Nzanga Mobutu
State Minister of the Interior Decentralization and Security	Denis Kalume
Minister of State for Foreign Affairs and International Cooperation	Antipas Mbusa Nyamwisi
Minister of State for Higher Education and University	Sylvain Ngabu Chumbu
Minister of State for Infrastructure Public Works and Reconstruction	Pierre Lumbi Okongo
Minister of State to the President of the Republic	Nkulu Mitumba Kilombo

=== Ministers ===
Position	Officeholder	Notes
Minister to the Prime Minister	Godfrey Mayobo Mpwene Ngantien	
Minister of National Defence and Veterans Affairs	Chikez Diemu	
Minister of Justice	Georges Minsay Booka	
Minister of Planning	Olivier Kamitatu Etsu	
Minister of Regional Integration	Ignace Gata Mavinga	
Minister of Finance	Athanase Matenda Kyelu	
Budget Minister	Adolphe Muzito	
Portfolio Minister	Ms Jeannine Mabunda Lioko	
Minister of National Economy	Sylvain Joel Bifwila Tchamwala	
Minister of Information Press and National Communication	Toussaint Tshilombo Send	
Minister of Industry	Simon Mboso Kiamputu	
Foreign Trade	Kasongo Ilunga	Appointed 6 February 2007, but did not attend the opening of government – Ilunga's existence is disputed
Foreign Trade	Denis Mbuyu Manga	From 28 May 2007
Women's Affairs	Philomène Omatuku Atshakawo Akatshi	
Minister of Small and Medium Enterprises	Jean François Ekofo Panzoko	
Minister of Transport and Communication Channels	Remy Henri Kuseyo Gatanga	
Minister of Rural Development	Charles Mwando Nsimba	
Minister of Primary Secondary and Vocational Education	Maker Mwangu Famba	
Minister of Scientific Research	Sylvanus Mushi Bonane	
Minister of Public Health	Victor Makwenge Kaput	
Minister of Mines	Martin Kabwelulu Labilo	
Minister of Energy	Solomon Banamuhere Baliene	
Minister of Hydrocarbons	Lambert Mende Omalanga	
Minister of Labour and Social Welfare	Marie-Ange Lukiana Mufwankolo	
Minister of Public Service	Zéphyrin Diambu Mutu-di-Lusala Nieva	
Minister of Social Affairs and National Solidarity	Martin Bitijula Mahimba	
Minister of Women	Philomena Omatuku Atshakawo Akatshi	
Minister of Youth and Sports	Pardonne Kaliba Mulanga	
Minister of Land Affairs	Liliane Pande Muaba	
Minister of Planning and habitat	Lawrence M Simon Ikenga Lisambola	
Postmaster Telephones and Telecommunications	Kyamusoke Bamusulanga Nta-Bote	
Minister of Environment	Didace Pembe Bokiaga	
Minister of Tourism	Kakule Mbahingana Elias	
Minister of Culture and the Arts	Marcel Malenso Ndodila	
Human Rights Minister	Eugene Lokwa Ilwaloma	
Minister of Humanitarian Affairs	Jean-Claude Muyambo Kyassa	

== Second cabinet ==
The Ministers of State and Ministers appointed on 25 November 2007 were:

=== Ministers of State ===
Position	Officeholder
Agriculture	Nzanga Mobutu
Interior and security	Denis Kalume Numbi
Minister of State to the President of the Republic	Nkulu Mitumba Kilombo

=== Ministers ===
Position	Officeholder
Minister to the Prime Minister	Godefroid Mayobo Mpwene Ngantien
Budget	Adolphe Muzito
Communications and Media	Emile Bongeli
Culture and Arts	Esdras Kambale Baekwa
Energy	Salomon Banamuhere Baliene
Environment, Conservation and Tourism	José Endundu
Finance	Athanase Matenda Kyelu
Foreign Affairs and International Cooperation	Antipas Mbusa Nyamwisi
Gender, Family and Children	Philomène Omatuku Atshakawo Akatshi
Higher Education, Universities and Scientific Research	Léonard Masuga Rugamira
Hydrocarbons	Lambert Mende Omalanga
Industry and Small and Medium Enterprises	Simon Mboso Kiamputu
Infrastructure, Public Works and Reconstruction	Pierre Lumbi Okongo
Justice and Human Rights	Mutombo Bakafwa Nsenda
Labor	Marie Ange Lukiana Mufwankol
Land	Edouard Kabukapua Bitanga
Mines	Martin Kabwelulu Labilo
National Defencse and Veterans	Chikez Diemu
National Economy and Commerce	André Philippe Futa
Parliamentary Relations	Adolphe Lumanu Mulenda Bwana Sefu
Planning	Olivier Kamitatu Etsu
Portfolio	Jeannine Mabunda Mudiay Lioko
Post, Telephones and Telecommunications	Louise Munga Mesozi
Primary, Secondary and Vocational Education	Maker Mwangu Famba
Public Health	Victor Makwenge Kaput
Public Service	Laurent-Simon Ikenge Lisambola
Social Affairs, Humanitarian Action and National Solidarity	Jean-Claude Muyambo Kyassa
Transport and Communication Routes	Charles Mwando Nsimba
Urban Affairs and Habitat	Sylvain Ngabu Chumbu
Youth and sports	Willy Bokonga

=== Deputy ministers ===
Position	Officeholder
Interior	Joseph-Davel Mpango Okundo
Foreign affairs	Ignace Gata
Congolese abroad	Colette Tshomba Ntundu
National Defense and veterans	Luc Amuri wa Mukulu
Human rights	Claude Bizibuye Nyamugabo
Finance	César Lubamba Ngimbi
Budget	Célestin Mbuyu Kabango
Public works	Gervais Nturumenyerwa Kimonyo
Mines	Victor Kasongo Shomary
Rural development	Xavier Bonane Ya Ngazi
Scientific research	Rugabishe Nsenginyumva
Vocational training	Arthur Sedea Ngama Zabusu

== See also ==
- Adolphe Muzito cabinet
