= Adolphe Muzito cabinet =

Prime Minister Adolphe Muzitos cabinet

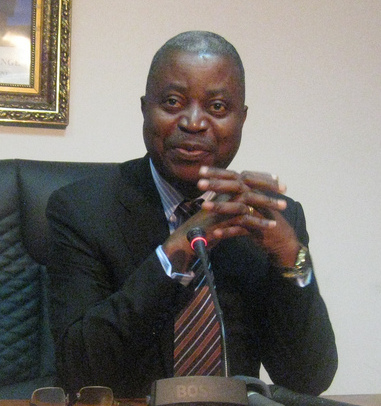
Adolphe Muzito

The Adolphe Muzito cabinet consists of the ministers of state, ministers and vice-ministers that form the government of the Democratic Republic of the Congo under Prime Minister Adolphe Muzito, who took office on 10 October 2008.

== First cabinet ==
The first cabinet was announced on 26 October 2008. There were three deputy prime ministers, 37 ministers and 14 deputy ministers. Eight ministers from the former team remained at their posts, others were swapped and 16 new members entered the cabinet.

=== Deputy prime ministers ===
Ministry	Officeholder
Basic Social Needs	Nzanga Mobutu
Reconstruction	Emile Bongeli
Security and Defense	Mutombo Bakafwa Nsenda

=== Ministers ===
Ministry	Officeholder
Interior and Security	Célestin Mbuyu Kabanga
National Defense and Veterans	Charles Mwando Nsimba
Foreign Affairs	Alexis Thambwe Mwamba
Decentralisation and Planning	Antipas Mbusa Nyamwisi
International and Regional Cooperation	Raymond Tshibanda N'Tungamulongo
Justice	Luzolo Bambi Lessa
Relations with Parliament	Adolphe Lumanu Mulenda Bwana N’Sefu
Infrastructure, Public Works and Reconstruction	Pierre Lumbi Okongo
Finance	Athanase Matenda Kyelu
Planning	Olivier Kamitatu Etsu
Budget	Michel Lokola Elemba
Environment, Conservation and Tourism	José Endundo Bononge
National Economy and Trade	André Philippe Futa
Portfolio	Jeannine Mabunda
Agriculture	Norbert Basengezi Katitima
Transport and Communication Routes	Matthieu Pita
Mines	Martin Kabwelulu
Energy	Laurent Muzangisa Mutalamu
Hydrocarbons	René Isekemanga Nkeka
PTT	Louise Munga Mesozi
Industry	Simon Mboso Kiamputu
Communication and Media	Lambert Mende Omalanga
Public Health	Auguste Mupipi Mulumania
EPSP	Maker Mwangu Famba
Higher Education and Universities	Léonard Mashako Mamba
Land Affairs	Kisimba Ngoy Maj
Urban Planning	Générose Loshiku Muya
Labor	Ferdinand Kambere Kalumbi
Public Service	Michel Botoro Bodias
Rural Development	Safi Adiki
Youth and Sports	Patrick Sulubika Matchembera
Small and Medium Enterprises	Claude Basibuha Nyamulabu
Scientific Research	Joseph Lititiyo Apata
Human Rights	Upio Kakura
Gender, Family and Children	Marie-Ange Lukiana Mufwankol
Social Affairs, Humanitarian Action and National solidarity	Barthélemy Botswali Lengomo

=== Deputy ministers ===
Ministry	Officeholder
Interior	Zéphirin Mungongo
Defense and Veterans	Oscar Masamba Matemo
Foreign Affairs	Ignace Gata Mavita wa Lufuta
Congolese Abroad	Colette Tshomba Ntundu
Justice	Musonda Kalusambi
Public Works	Gervais Ntirumenyerwa Kimonyo
Finance	César Lubamba wa Lubamba
Budget	Alain Lubamba wa Lubamba
Agriculture	Kibibi Kamanzi
Mines	Victor Kasongo Shomari
Hydrocarbons	Gustave Beya Siku
Vocation Education	Arthur Sedea Zabuso
Higher Education	Bokele Djema
Rural Development	Willy Mubobo Nzamba

== Second cabinet ==
On 20 February 2010 Joseph Kabila reshuffled the cabinet. Adolphe Muzito was retained as prime minister and Nzanga Mobutu kept his post as deputy prime minister and minister of employment, labor and welfare. The number of members of government was reduced from 54 to 43.

Nzanga Mobutu was dismissed in March 2011. Bernard Biondo, Minister of External Trade and a member of Mobutu's UDEMO party, resigned in solidarity. Minister of Rural Development Philippe Undji was fired and jailed for embezzlement. In September 2011, the Decentralization Minister Antipas Mbusa Nyamwisi resigned to run for president. A minor cabinet reshuffle was announced on 11 September 2011. The Ministry of Decentralization was abolished. Jean-Pierre Daruwezi became head of the National Intelligence Agency, and Louis Alphonse Daniel Koyagialo Ngbase te Gerengbo became Deputy Prime Minister and Minister of PTT. Other appointments were Jean-Pierre Daruwezi as Minister of Economy, Justin Kalumba Mwana Ngongo as Minister of External Trade and Charles Alulea Mengulwa as Minister Rural Development.

The cabinet announced on 20 February, with changes as of 11 September 2011 were:

=== Deputy prime ministers ===
Ministry	Officeholder
Labor, Employment and Social Security	Nzanga Mobutu (to March 2011)
Interior and Security	Adolphe Lumanu Mulenda Bwana N'Sefu
Postal Services, Telephones, and Telecommunications	Simon Bulupiy Galati (to 11 September 2011); Louis Alphonse Koyagialo Ngbase te Gerengbo (from 11 September 2011)

=== Ministers ===
Ministry	Officholder
Foreign Affairs	Alexis Thambwe Mwamba
Cooperation International and Regional National	Raymond Tshibanda N'Tungamulongo
Defense and Veterans	Charles Mwando Simba
Justice and Human Rights	Luzolo Bambi Lessa
Relations with the Parliament	Richard Muyej Mangenz
Communication and Media	Lambert Mende Omalanga
Decentralization	Antipas Mbusa Nyamwisi (to September 2011)
Finance	Matata Ponyo Mapon
Budget	Jean-Baptiste Ntahwa Kuderwa Batumike
Planning	Olivier Kamitatu Etsu
Portfolio	Jeannine Mabunda Lioko
National Economy and Trade	Jean-Marie Bulambo Kilosho (to September 2011); Jean-Pierre Daruwezi Mokombe (from September 2011)
Infrastructures, Public works and Reconstruction	Fridolin Kasweshi Musoka
Environment, Conservation of nature and Tourism	José Endundo Bononge
Energy	Gilbert Tshiongo Tshibinkubuka wa Tumba
Mines	Martin Kabwelulu Labilo
Hydrocarbons	Célestin Mbuyu Kabango
Transports and Communication channels	Laure-Marie Kawanda Kayena; Joseph Martin Kitumba Gagedi Gasagisa Mwanza
Public Health	Victor Makwenge Kaput
Higher and University education	Leonard Mashako Mamba
Primary, Secondary, and Vocational Education	Maker Mwangu Famba
Agriculture	Norbert Basengezi Katintima
Rural Development	Philippe Undji Yangya (dismissed); Charles Alulea Mengulwa (from September 2011)
Industry	Anicet Kuzunda Mutangiji
Commerce	Bernard Biando Sango (resigned March 2011); Justin Kalumba Mwana Ngongo
Medium & Small Business	Jean-Marie Bulambo Kilosho
Gender, Family Affairs and Children	Marie-Ange Lukiana Mufwankolo
Land Affairs	Kisimba Ngoy Maj
Urban Planning and Housing	César Lubamba Ngimbi
Labor	Simon Bulupiy Galati
Social Affairs, Humanitarian Action & National Solidarity	Ferdinand Kambere Kalumbi
Public Service	Dieudonné Upira Sunguma Kagimbi
Scientific Research	Jean-Pierre Bokole Ompoka
Youth and Sports	Claude Bazibuhe Nyamugabo
Culture and Arts	Jeannette Kavira Mupera

=== Vice-ministers ===
Position	Officeholder
Interior	Georges Zuka Mon'Do Ugonda-Lemba
Foreign Affairs	Ignace Gata Mavita wa Lufuta
Justice and Human Rights	Céline Leteta Kumisa (to September 2011)
Finance	Jean Mbitso Ngedza
Budget	André Shikay Luboya Bankina
Trade	Xavérine Karomba Mitimtuje
Public Works	Gervais Ntirumenyerwa Kimonyo
Transport	Willy Bakinga W'Ilina (to September 2011)
Primary, Secondary & Professional Education	Arthur Sedea Ngamu Zabusu
Labor & Social Affairs	Musa Kalema (to September 2011)

== See also ==
- Antoine Gizenga cabinet
