= Sylvain Ngabu Chumbu =

Minister of State for Higher Education and Universities
- In office 5 February 2007 – 25 November 2007
- Succeeded by: Léonard Masuga Rugamira

Minister of Urban Development and Housing
- In office 25 November 2007 – 26 October 2008
- Succeeded by: Générose Loshiku Muya

Sylvain Ngabu Chumbu is a politician in the Democratic Republic of the Congo who was briefly Minister of State for Higher Education and Universities in 2007.

Ngabu obtained a master's degree in Economic Sciences from the University of Leuven in Brussels. As of March 2006 Ngabu was Permanent Secretary of the Parti Lumumbiste Unifié (PALU). Ngabu was appointed Minister of State for Higher Education and Universities in the first cabinet of Prime Minister Antoine Gizenga on 5 February 2007. In October 2007 he was interviewed at his office by two journalists. They were asked to leave after a disagreement broke out, and they alleged that they were assaulted by the police who ejected them. Following the incident the press were forbidden from talking to him.

Ngabu was appointed Minister of Urban Development and Housing in the second Gizenga cabinet, announced on 25 November 2007. In July 2008 he signed an MOU for construction of social housing with the NGO Congo développement in partnership with the Fly Investment Group. The project had a broad scope that also included of construction of hospitals, schools, supermarkets, gas stations, parks, hotels, sports complexes, exhibition centers and administrative buildings. He was not included in the first cabinet of Prime Minister Adolphe Muzito, announced on 26 October 2008. His successor as Minister of Urbanism and Habitat, Madam Générose Lushiku Muya, pledged to continue his development program while recognizing the great challenge involved and the need to reform the ministry to make it practical.
