= Second Matata government =

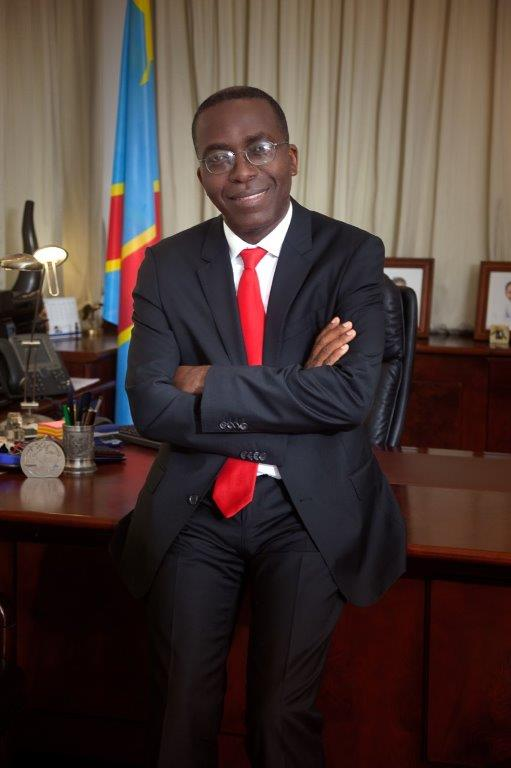
- Date formed: December 7, 2014
- Date dissolved: November 14, 2016

People and organisations
- President: Joseph Kabila
- Head of government: Matata Ponyo Mapon
- Member parties: PPRD, MLC, PALU, UFC

History
- Predecessor: Matata I
- Successor: Badibanga

The Second Matata government was the government of the Democratic Republic of the Congo under Matata Ponyo Mapon from December 7, 2014, to November 14, 2016. It underwent a reshuffle on September 25, 2015, as some parties were excluded from the presidential majority.

== Background ==
The First Matata government was formed when Matata was appointed prime minister in 2012. The second government was composed of four deputy prime ministers, two ministers of state, 32 ministers, and ten deputy ministers.

== Prime Minister ==
Image	Portfolio	Name	Party
	Prime Minister	Matata Ponyo Mapon	PPRD

== Deputy Prime Ministers ==
Image	Portfolio	Name	Political Party
	Interior and Security	Évariste Boshab	PPRD
	Posts and Telecommunications, New Information and Communication Technologies	Thomas Luhaka	MLC
N/A	Employment, Work, and Social Security	Willy Makiashi	PALU

== Ministers of State ==
Image	Portfolio	Name	Political Party
N/A	Decentralization and Customary Affairs	Michel Bongongo	Union of Forces for Change
N/A	Decentralization and Customary Affairs	Salomon Banamuhere Baliene	PPRD

== Ministers ==
Image	Portfolio	Name	Date
N/A	Land Affairs	Dieudonné Bolengetenge Balea	until September 25, 2015
N/A	Land Affairs	Gustave Boloko Nkeli	since September 25, 2015
N/A	Foreign Affairs and International Cooperation	Raymond Tshibanda	until September 25, 2015
N/A	Social Affairs and Humanitarian Action	Mushitu Kat Jewel	until September 25, 2015
N/A	Social Affairs and Humanitarian Action	Adele Degbalase Kanda	since September 25, 2015
N/A	Agriculture, Fishing, and Livestock	Isidore Kabwe Mwehu	until September 25, 2015
N/A	Agriculture, Fishing, and Livestock	Emile Mota Ndongo Kang	since September 25, 2015
N/A	Land Use Planning, Urban Planning, and Housing	Omer Egwake	
N/A	Trade	Kudianga Bayokisa	
N/A	Communication and Media	Lambert Mende Omalanga	
N/A	Culture and Arts	Banza Mukalay	
N/A	National Defense and Veterans Affairs	Aimé Ngoy Mukena	until September 25, 2015
N/A	National Defense and Veterans Affairs	Crispin Atama Tabe	since September 25, 2015
N/A	Rural Development	Eugène Serufuli Ngayabaseka	
N/A	National Economy	Modeste Bahati Lukwebo	
N/A	Energy and Water Resources	Jeannot Matadi Nenga	
N/A	Primary and Secondary Education and New Citizen Introduction	Maker Mwangu Famba	
N/A	Higher and University Education	Théophile Mbemba Fundu	
N/A	Technical and Vocational Education	Jean Nengbaga Tshibanda	
	Environment and Sustainable Development	Bienvenu Liyota Ndjoli	until September 25, 2015
N/A	Environment and Sustainable Development	Robert Bopolo Begeza	since September 25, 2015
N/A	Finance	Henry Yav Mulang	
N/A	Public Service	Jean-Claude Kibala	until September 25, 2015
N/A	Public Service	Pascal Isumbisho Mwapu	since September 25, 2015
N/A	Acting Minister of Gender, Family and Children	Mushitu Kat Jewel	until September 25, 2015
N/A	Gender, Family and Children	Lucie Kipele Aki Azwa	since September 25, 2015
N/A	Hydrocarbons	Crispin Atama Tabe	until September 25, 2015
N/A	Hydrocarbons	Aime Ngoy Mukena	since September 25, 2015
N/A	Industry	Germain Kambinga	
N/A	Infrastructure, Public Works, and Reconstruction	Fridolin Kasweshi	
	Youth and Sports	Sama Lukonde	until September 25, 2015
N/A	Youth and Sports	Denis Kambayi Tshimbumbu	since September 25, 2015
N/A	Justice and Human Rights	Alexis Thambwe Mwamba	
N/A	Mining	Martin Kabwelulu	
N/A	Small and Medium Enterprises and the Middle Class	Bohongo Nkoyi	
	Modernization	Olivier Kamitatu Etsu	until September 25, 2015
N/A	Modernization	Georges Wembi Loambo	since September 25, 2015
N/A	Treasury	Louise Munga	
N/A	Scientific Research and Technology	Daniel Madimba Kalonji	
N/A	Parliamentary Relations	Tryphon Kin-Kiey Mulumba	
N/A	Public Health	Felix Kabange	
N/A	Tourism	Elvis Mutiri wa Bashara	
N/A	Transport	Justin Kalumba Mwana Ngongo	

== Deputy Ministers ==
Image	Portfolio	Name	Date
N/A	Budget	Ernestine Nyoka	until September 25, 2015
N/A	Congolese Diaspora	Antoine Boyamba Okombo	
N/A	International Cooperation and Regional Integration	Franck Mwe di Malila	
N/A	National Defense	Rene Sibu	
	Energy	Maguy Rwakabuba	
N/A	Finance	Albert Mpeti Biyombo	
N/A	Interior	Martine Ntumba Bukasa	
N/A	Justice and Human Rights	Mboso Nkodia Pwanga	
N/A	Planning	Lisette Bisangana Ngalamulume	until September 25, 2015
N/A	Planning	Franklin Tshiamala Manyiku	since September 25, 2015
N/A	Telecommunication	Enoch Sebineza	
