= Jean François Ekofo Panzoko =

Congolese politician

- Born: Zaire, now the Democratic Republic of the Congo
- Occupation: Politician

Jean François Ekofo Panzoko is a Congolese politician. On 5 February 2007, Panzoko was appointed as the Minister of Small and Medium Enterprises of the Democratic Republic of the Congo, under Antoine Gizenga Government that ran from 25 November 2007 under the leadership of Prime Minister Antoine Gizenga. Panzoko is a member of Unified Lumumbist Party (ULP).
