= Esdras Kambale Baekwa =

Congolese politician

- Born: Zaire, now the Democratic Republic of the Congo
- Occupation: Politician

Esdras Kambale Baekwa is a Congolese politician. On 25 November 2007, he was appointed as the Minister of Culture and Arts of the Democratic Republic of the Congo, under Antoine Gizenga's second cabinet that ran from 25 November 2007. He is the member of Unified Lumumbist Party (ULP).

== Background ==
=== Early life ===
Bahekwa was born in the city of Butembo, North Kivu Province, in the Democratic Republic of the Congo.

==== Education ====
Bahekwa graduated in Applied Pedagogy (English/African culture) from the National Pedagogical Institute, Kinshasa. He obtained a Master of Arts in education at the University of London (Instituts of Education).

=== Political career ===
Firstly, he was Head of Works at the Higher Educational Institute in Gombe, then he held high positions in the intelligence services of the Mobutu regime. In this capacity, he worked in Katanga, from 1990 to 1993, as Deputy Director. In November 2007, he was Minister of Culture and the Arts in the Government of Antoine Gizenga. He reprised the same role as Minister of Culture and Arts in the Muzito I government.
