= Remy Henri Kuseyo Gatanga =

Congolese politician

- Born: Zaire, now the Democratic Republic of the Congo
- Occupation: Politician

Remy Henri Kuseyo Gatanga is a Congolese politician. On 5 February 2007, Gatanga was appointed as the Minister of Transport and Communication Channels of the Democratic Republic of the Congo, under Antoine Gizenga Government that ran from 25 November 2007 under the leadership of Prime Minister Antoine Gizenga. Gatanga is a member of Unified Lumumbist Party (ULP).
