= Marcel Malenso Ndodila =

Congolese politician

- Born: Zaire, now the Democratic Republic of the Congo
- Occupation: Politician

Marcel Malenso Ndodila is a Congolese politician. On 5 February 2007, he was appointed as the Minister of Culture and the Arts of the Democratic Republic of the Congo, under Antoine Gizenga Government that ran from 25 November 2007 under the leadership of Prime Minister Antoine Gizenga. He is a member of Unified Lumumbist Party (ULP).

== Background ==
=== Early life ===
Ndodila was born in Congo-Kinshasa in the present-day DRC. He served as Minister of Culture and the Arts in the Gizenga government from 5 February 2007 until 25 September 2008, following the resignation of Prime Minister M. Tshisekedi. Gizenga. He is a member of the Congolese Alliance of Christian Democrats (ACDC). He was a Career Prefect for most of his life at the Monseigneur Bokeleale Institute (former LISANGA) in Kinshasa/ Gombe, with a particular focus on the search for excellence through work, good practices, and discipline.

=== Education ===
He graduated from medical school in 1990 and holds a PhD from the University of Antwerp. He has the distinction of having served simultaneously, from the academic year 1982-1983, as the Prefect of Studies in two of the country's largest schools, the Monsignor Bokeleale Institute (formerly the LISANGA Institute) and the Monsignor Shaumba High School (formerly LYPOK).

In 1983, Ndodila made 100% for the first time in the Bac with the Lisanga Math-Physics and Biochemistry Institute with the "Pagaille" generation. In July 2013, the second meetings of the elders of LISANGA and LYPOK held in Waterloo, Belgium, received Papa Malenso as the main guest to thank him for all the work done for the children of Congo and for him to see the result of this work.

== Death ==
Ndodila Marcel died on the 15th of August 2017 from a long illness.

== Legacy ==
Ndodila has contributed to the training of several university professors and lecturers such as at UNIKIN, Professor Mumba Ngoie, a microbiologist, is from the class of 1984 that Ndodila taught.
