= Sylvain Joel Bifwila Tchamwala =

Congolese politician

- Born: Zaire, now the Democratic Republic of the Congo
- Occupation: Politician

Sylvain Joel Bifwila Tchamwala is a Congolese politician. On 5 February 2007, he was appointed as the Minister of National Economy of the Democratic Republic of the Congo, under Antoine Gizenga Government that ran from 25 November 2007 under the leadership of Prime Minister Antoine Gizenga. He is a member of Unified Lumumbist Party (ULP).
