= Jean-Claude Muyambo Kyassa =

Congolese politician

- Born: Zaire, now the Democratic Republic of the Congo
- Occupation: Politician

Jean-Claude Muyambo Kyassa (born 26 October 1965) is a Congolese politician and the national chairman of the Solidarity for Democracy and Development (SCODE) political party.

Before becoming a minister, he was a staff member of the Lubumbashi Bar for 3 years and was replaced by Cyrille Ngoy Kyobe.

== Background ==
=== Early life ===
Kyassa was born 26 October 1965 in Kolwezi.

=== Political career ===
On 5 February 2007, Kyassa was appointed as the Minister of Humanitarian Affairs of the Democratic Republic of the Congo, under Antoine Gizenga Government that ran from 25 November 2007 under the leadership of Prime Minister Antoine Gizenga. Kyassa is the member of Unified Lumumbist Party (ULP). It was reported that Kyassa would leave the Sacred Union, which supports President Félix Tshisekedi.

Kyassa owns a 400 ha wildlife park called Muyambo Park3, a television station and a radio station, Radio Télévision Lubumbashi Jua (RTLJ) which broadcasts in Lubumbashi in Upper Katanga Province and surrounding areas on 89.3 MHz and television on 495.25 UHF.

In January 2023, Kyassa announced his candidacy for the presidential election that was scheduled for 2023.
