= Sylvanus Mushi Bonane =

Congolese politician

- Born: Zaire, now the Democratic Republic of the Congo
- Occupation: Politician

Sylvanus Mushi Bonane is a Congolese politician. On 5 February 2007, Bonane was appointed as the Minister of Scientific Research of the Democratic Republic of the Congo, under Antoine Gizenga Government that ran from 25 November 2007 under the leadership of Prime Minister Antoine Gizenga. Bonane is a member of Unified Lumumbist Party (ULP).
