= Liliane Pande Muaba =

Congolese politician

- Born: Zaire, now the Democratic Republic of the Congo
- Occupation: Politician

Liliane Pande Muaba is a Congolese politician. On 5 February 2007, Muaba was appointed as the Minister of Land Affairs of the Democratic Republic of the Congo, under Antoine Gizenga Government that ran from 25 November 2007 under the leadership of Prime Minister Antoine Gizenga. Muaba is the member of Unified Lumumbist Party (ULP).
