= Zéphyrin Diambu Mutu-di-Lusala Nieva =

Congolese politician

- Born: Zaire, now the Democratic Republic of the Congo
- Occupation: Politician

Zéphyrin Diambu Mutu-di-Lusala Nieva is a Congolese politician. On 5 February 2007, Nieva was appointed as the Minister of Public Service of the Democratic Republic of the Congo, under Antoine Gizenga Government that ran from 25 November 2007 under the leadership of Prime Minister Antoine Gizenga. Nieva is a member of Unified Lumumbist Party (ULP).
