= Kyamusoke Bamusulanga Nta-Bote =

Congolese politician

- Born: Zaire, now the Democratic Republic of the Congo
- Occupation: Politician

Kyamusoke Bamusulanga Nta-Bote is a Congolese politician. On 5 February 2007, he was appointed as the Minister of Postmaster Telephones and Telecommunications of the Democratic Republic of the Congo, under Antoine Gizenga Government that ran from 25 November 2007 under the leadership of Prime Minister Antoine Gizenga. He is the member of Unified Lumumbist Party (ULP).
