= Pardonne Kaliba Mulanga =

Congolese politician

- Born: Zaire, now the Democratic Republic of the Congo
- Occupation: Politician

Pardonne Kaliba Mulanga is a Congolese politician. On 5 February 2007, he was appointed as the Minister of Youth and Sports of the Democratic Republic of the Congo, under Antoine Gizenga Government that ran from 25 November 2007 under the leadership of Prime Minister Antoine Gizenga. He is a member of Unified Lumumbist Party (ULP). He died on 18 July 2024.

== Background ==
=== Early life ===
Pardonne Kaliba Mulanga was born on May 30, 1958 in Makola, Democratic Republic of the Congo. He is originally from South Kivu and was elected MP for the Fizi constituency. In February 2007, he was appointed Minister of Youth, Sports and Leisure in the Government of Prime Minister Antoine Gizenga. Prior to his appointment to the Government, Pardonne Kaliba Mulanga was Minister of Rural Development. Before that, he was one of the Maï-Maï entity delegates at the Inter-Congolese Dialogue in South Africa. He is a member of the Parti des Patriotes Résistants Maï-Maï (PRM) of which he is National President.
