= Willy Makiaski =

Deputy Prime Minister of Employment, Labor, and Social Welfare
- In office December 8, 2014 – November 19, 2016
- Preceded by: Modeste Bahati Lukwebo
- Succeeded by: Lambert Matuku

National Deputy for Kwilu
- Incumbent
- Assumed office February 16, 2012

Personal details
- Born: July 2, 1967 (age 59) MC Lozo, Gungu Territory, Kwilu District, Zaire (now Democratic Republic of the Congo
- Party: Unified Lumumbist Party

Willy Makiaski is a Congolese politician who served as Deputy Prime Minister of Employment, Labor, and Social Welfare between December 2014 and November 2015 in the Second Matata government. He currently serves as a National Deputy for Gungu.

== Biography ==
Makiaski was born on July 2, 1967, in MC Lozo, the son of Delphin Makiaski and Alfreda Ganene. He is originally from Kondo, Gungu Territory, Kwilu District, Bandundu Province. He holds a doctorate in law from the University of Kinshasa.

Makiaski has served as the spokesperson and permanent secretary of the Unified Lumumbist Party (PALU). He served as a national deputy for Gungu, and later Kwilu after the 2015 redistricting. He was first elected in November 2011, and re-elected in 2018 and 2023.

In 2014, Makiaski was appointed Deputy Prime Minister of Employment, Labor, and Social Welfare in the Second Matata government. He was replaced by Lambert Mahuku in 2015.

In 2024, Makiaski was removed as secretary-general of PALU and replaced by Didier Mazenga Mukanzu.
