= Toussaint Tshilombo Send =

Congolese politician

- Born: Zaire, now the Democratic Republic of the Congo
- Occupation: Politician

Toussaint Tshilombo Send is a Congolese politician. On 5 February 2007, he was appointed as the Minister of Information Press and National Communication of the Democratic Republic of the Congo, under Antoine Gizenga Government that ran from 25 November 2007 under the leadership of Prime Minister Antoine Gizenga. He is a member of Unified Lumumbist Party (ULP).
