= Lawrence M Simon Ikenga Lisambola =

Congolese politician

- Born: Zaire, now the Democratic Republic of the Congo
- Occupation: Politician

Lawrence M Simon Ikenga Lisambola is a Congolese politician. On 5 February 2007, he was appointed as the Minister of Planning and habitat of the Democratic Republic of the Congo, under Antoine Gizenga Government that ran from 25 November 2007 under the leadership of Prime Minister Antoine Gizenga. He is the member of Unified Lumumbist Party (ULP).
