= Laure-Marie Kawanda =

Congolese politician

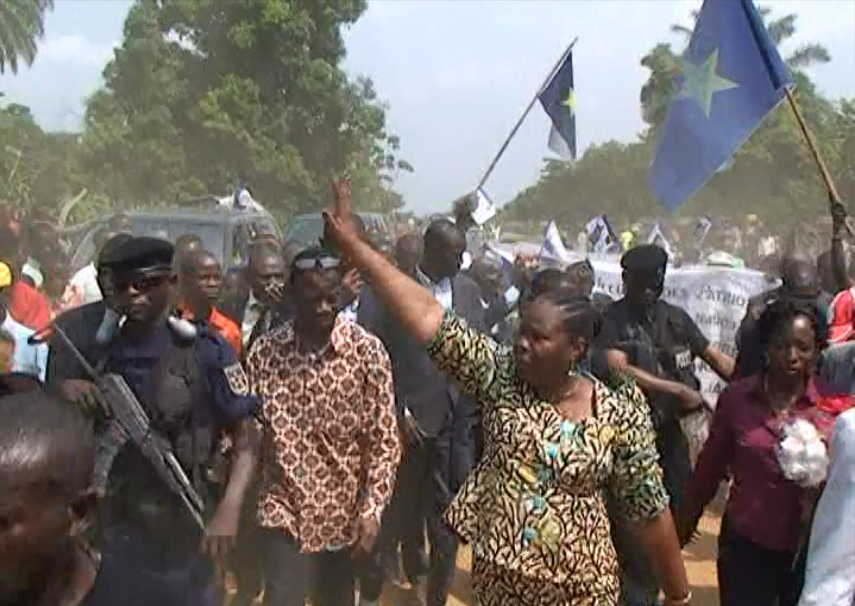
- Born: August 17, 1957 (age 68); Kikwit
- Other name: Kayena
- Citizenship: Congo-Kinshasa
- Occupations: Pharmacist, Politician
- Political party: Unified Lumumbist Party (PALU)
- Other political affiliations: L'Alliance des patriotes Lumumbistes (APL)
- Spouse: Gabriel Kalassa M'siri (married 1986–present)

Laure-Marie Kayena (born Laure-Marie Kawanda Kayena, on August 17, 1957, in Kikwit, Leopoldville province) is a pharmacist, politician and former Minister of Transport and Communications, from Congo-Kinshasa.

== Biography ==
Laure-Marie Kawanda Kayena was born on August 17, 1957, in Kikwit, Leopoldville province, Democratic Republic of Congo. She trained professionally as a pharmacist. She held several positions in the government and public enterprises, notably in the Gizenga I and Muzito II governments, where she became Minister of Transport and Communications on February 19, 2010. She was dismissed in the first half of 2011. Her dismissal pertained to controversies surrounding the sinking of a boat on a river in north-western Democratic Republic of Congo that saw 50 people are dead and 35 others missing.

After being the private secretary of Antoine Gizenga since 2011, she became permanent secretary and representative of the secretary general, leader of the party, within the Unified Lumumbist Party (PALU). Then at the end of 2013, she participated in the creation of a new party, L'Alliance des patriotes Lumumbistes (APL), of which she has been president since its creation on January 18, 2014. She has been married since 1986 to Gabriel Kalassa M'siri, a training journalist turned diplomat who works in the Ministry of Foreign Affairs of the Democratic Republic of Congo.
