= Claude Bizibuye Nyamugabo =

Congolese politician

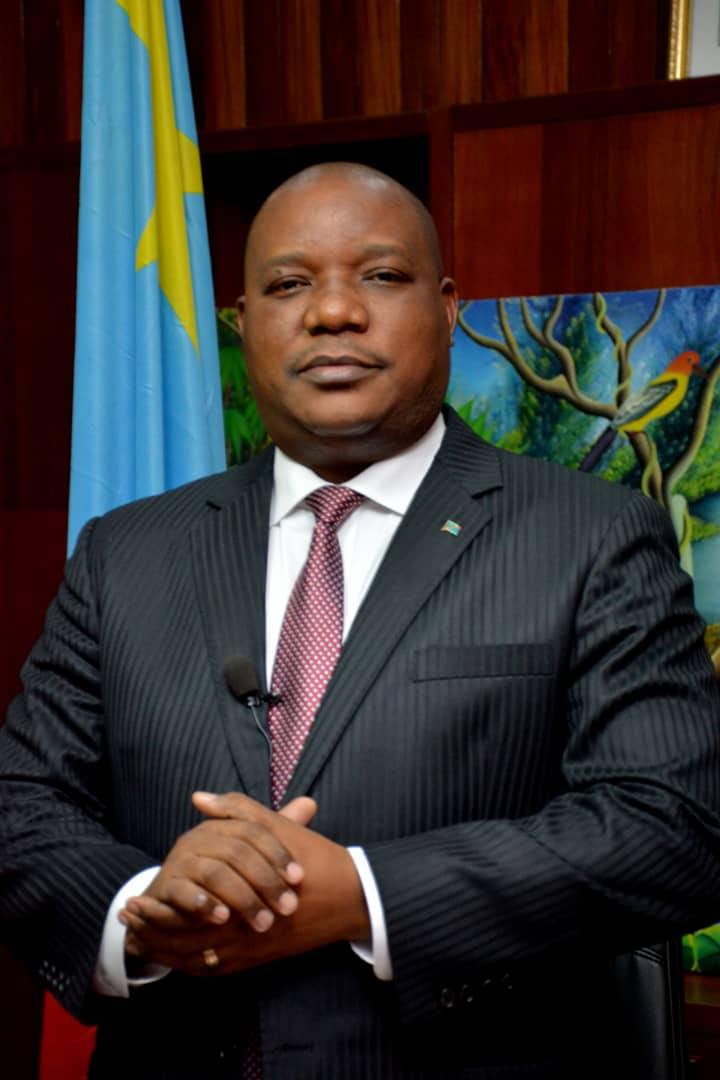
- Born: Zaire, now the Democratic Republic of the Congo
- Occupation: Politician

Claude Bizibuye Nyamugabo is a Congolese politician who served as the Mayor of Kigali City from 2011 to 2017. He was also the Minister of the Environment and Sustainable Development in the Ilunga government between September 2019 and April 2021.

== Background ==
=== Early life ===
Claude Bizimana Nyamugabo was born on 12 August 1960, in the former Kibungo Prefecture, Rwanda. He grew up in a family of farmers and was the youngest of six children. He completed his primary and secondary education in Kibungo before moving to the capital city, Kigali, to pursue higher education.

=== Career ===
Nyamugabo started his career as a teacher and later worked as a lecturer at the National University of Rwanda. He entered politics in the early 2000s and served as a councilor in Kigali City Council before becoming the Mayor of Kigali City in 2011. During his tenure as Mayor, Nyamugabo focused on urban development, infrastructure improvement, and social services enhancement.

On 25 November 2007, Nyamugabo was appointed as the Deputy Minister of Human rights of the Democratic Republic of the Congo, under Antoine Gizenga's second cabinet that ran from 25 November 2007.

As of January 2014, Bazibuhe was the commander of the PPRD's armed wing in the DRC. From October 2017 to March 2019 he was governor of the province of South Kivu. He is Minister of SMEs (Small and Medium Enterprises) in the Muzito I government between 2008 and 2010.

Nyamugabo is the member of Unified Lumumbist Party (ULP).

== Awards and honors ==
Nyamugabo has received several awards for his contributions to urban development and public service, including the Rwandan Ministry of Local Government's Best Mayor Award and the African Mayor's Award for Innovation in Urban Development.
