= Willy Bokonga =

Congolese politician

Minister of State, Minister of Primary, Secondary and Technical Education
- Assuming office
- President: Félix Tshisekedi
- Prime Minister: Sylvester Ilunga
- Succeeding: Gaston Musemena

Personal details
- Born: Zaire, now the Democratic Republic of the Congo
- Occupation: Politician

Willy Bokonga is a Congolese politician. He was the former Minister of State, Minister of Primary, Secondary and Technical Education succeeding Gaston Musemena as the Minister of State, Minister of Primary, Secondary and Technical Education in the Ilunga government. In April 2021, Bakonga was sentenced to three years in prison without an appeal for money laundering. The case also involved the illegal transfer of funds abroad. His son was also arrested.

== Background ==
=== Early life ===
Bakonga is also a professor of history at the Massamba School Prefect opposite Georges Simenon in DRC.

=== Political career ===
Bokonga was appointed as the Minister of Youth and sports of the Democratic Republic of the Congo, under Antoine Gizenga's second cabinet that ran from 25 November 2007. He is the member of Unified Lumumbist Party (ULP).
