= Nkulu Mitumba Kilombo =

Congolese politician

Norbert Nkulu Mitumba Kilombo

Minister of State to the Presidency of the Republic
- In office March 2005 – October 2008

Personal details
- Born: December 15, 1946 (age 79)
- Education: Lovanium University

Norbert Nkulu Mitumba Kilombo (born 15 December 1946) is a politician in the Democratic Republic of the Congo. In the first cabinet of Prime Minister Antoine Gizenga, formed on 5 February 2007, he was named Minister of State to the President of the Republic. He retained this position in the Gizenga's second cabinet, announced on 25 November 2007.

Likasi was born on 15 December 1946. He is an ethnic Luba-Katanga from the Malemba-Nkulu Territory of Haut-Lomami Province. In 1971 he obtained a degree in law from Lovanium University (now Kinshasa University). He practiced at the Kinshasa Bar while also consulting to several cabinets and directing various government agencies. After leaving cabinet office, in July 2009 he was proposed as head of the diplomatic head of the DRC mission in Kigali, Rwanda.
