= Néfertiti Ngudianza =

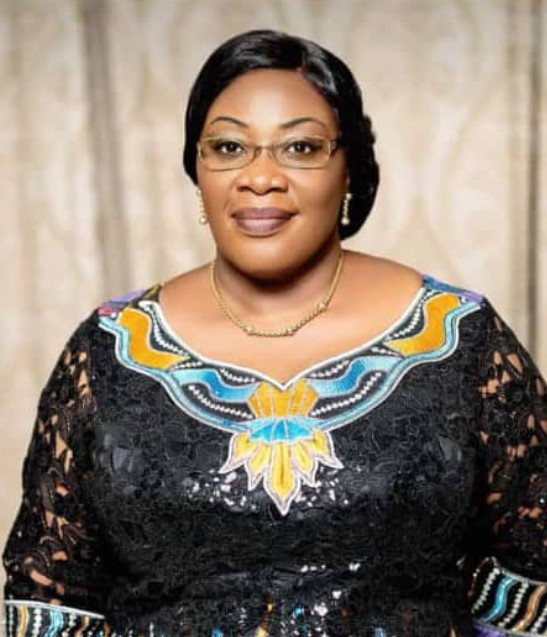
- Ngudianza in 2025

Rapporteur of the Senate
- Incumbent
- Assumed office 15 August 2024

Senator from Kongo Central
- Incumbent
- Assumed office 29 April 2019

Minister of Foreign Trade
- In office 9 December 2014 – 19 December 2016
- President: Joseph Kabila
- Prime Minister: Matata Ponyo Mapon

Personal details
- Born: 19 December 1971 (age 54) DRC
- Party: Alliance of Actors Attached to the People (AAAP)
- Spouse: Adler Kisula Betika
- Children: 6
- Education: University of Kinshasa

Néfertiti Ngudianza Bayokisa Kisula (born 19 December 1971) is a Congolese lawyer and politician who served as Minister of Trade in the Second Matata government (2014 to 2016). As of 2025, she serves as Senator for Kongo Central and as Rapporteur of the Senate.

== Biography ==
Ngudianza was born on 19 December 1971 in Nsundi Lutete in the Luozi Territory. She is the sixth of seven daughters in her family.

Ngudianza was educated at kindergarten and secondary school in the United States of America. After returning to the DRC, Ngudianza studied a law degree at the University of Kinshasa, and joined the Congo Bar. She was a member of the Association of Congolese Women Lawyers and the International Association of Young Lawyers.

Ngudianza served as Minister of Foreign Trade in the Second Matata government from 9 December 2014 to 19 December 2016. In post, she oversaw an avian flu crisis regarding chicken products, discussed the implementation of a single form of foreign trade tax, and obtained laboratory equipment from the European Union's Aid for Trade Program to enable testing for counterfeit pharmaceutical products.

In 2019, Ngudianza was elected one of the four senators of Kongo Central, becoming the only woman senator of the province. She was re-elected in 2023.

In 2024, Ngudianza ran as a candidate for the position of Rapporteur of the Senate (secretary and spokesperson). She was elected with 87 out of 96 votes. While in this post she has also been involved in piloting a project aimed at highlighting the achievements of women ministers, senators and deputies with representatives of the United Nations (UN) Women DRC.

Ngudianza founded the Ngudianza Foundation in 2015.
