= Edouard Kabukapua Bitanga =

Congolese politician

- Born: Zaire, now the Democratic Republic of the Congo
- Occupation: Politician

Edouard Kabukapua Bitanga is a Congolese politician. On 25 November 2007, he was appointed as the Minister of Land of the Democratic Republic of the Congo, under Antoine Gizenga's second cabinet that ran from 25 November 2007. He is the member of Unified Lumumbist Party (ULP).
