= César Lubamba Ngimbi =

Congolese politician

Minister of Urban Development and Housing
- In office 19 February 2010 – 6 March 2012
- President: Joseph Kabila
- Prime Minister: Adolphe Muzito
- Preceded by: Generose Lushiku Muya
- Succeeded by: Fridolin Kasweshi

Personal details
- Born: 22 November 1959 (age 66) Belgian Congo, now the Democratic Republic of the Congo
- Occupation: Politician

César Lubamba Ngimbi is a Congolese politician. On 25 November 2007, he was appointed as the Deputy Minister of Finance of the Democratic Republic of the Congo, under Antoine Gizenga's second cabinet that ran from 25 November 2007. He is the member of Unified Lumumbist Party (ULP).

In 2015, Lubamba helped on the construction of 1000 social housing units in Bandalungwa.

== Background ==
=== Early life ===
César Lubamba Ngimbi was born on 22 November 1959, in the Democratic Republic of Congo. His parents were both educators, and he was raised in a family that valued education and public service.

=== Career ===
Lubamba Ngimbi began his career as a civil servant in the Ministry of Urban Development and Housing. He quickly rose through the ranks, becoming a senior official in the ministry. In 2011, he was appointed Minister of Urban Development and Housing in the Muzito III government, a position he held until 2014.

== Achievements ==
During his tenure as Minister, Lubamba Ngimbi oversaw several major urban development projects, including the construction of new housing units and the renovation of existing infrastructure. He also implemented policies aimed at reducing urban poverty and improving access to basic services such as water and sanitation.

=== Other ventures ===
In addition to his political career, Lubamba Ngimbi has also worked as a consultant for several international organizations, including the United Nations Development Programme and the World Bank. He has also taught at several universities in the Democratic Republic of Congo and abroad.

== Awards and honors ==
Lubamba Ngimbi has received several awards for his contributions to urban development and public service, including the Grand Cordon of the Order of the Leopard, one of the highest honors in the Democratic Republic of Congo.
