= Luc Amuri wa Mukulu =

Congolese politician

- Born: Zaire, now the Democratic Republic of the Congo
- Occupation: Politician

Luc Amuri wa Mukulu is a Congolese politician. On 25 November 2007, Mukulu was appointed as the Deputy Minister of National Defense and veterans of the Democratic Republic of the Congo, under Antoine Gizenga's second cabinet that ran from 25 November 2007. Mukulu is a member of Unified Lumumbist Party (ULP).
