= Gilbert Tshiongo Tshibinkubula wa Ntumba =

Congolese politician (1942–2021)

Gilbert Tshiongo Tshibinkubula wa Ntumba (19 August 1942 – 1 February 2021) was a Congolese engineer, politician, and civil servant.

Tshiongo was born on 19 August 1942 in Lusambo, present-day Sankuru province, in Belgian Congo. He graduated with vocational and technical degrees in electromechanics in 1960.

Professionally, Tshiongo spent much of his career at Regideso, the country's public sector water delivery utility. In 1962, Tshiongo joined Regideso as the head of electromechanical and hydraulic plants in Kabinda. He later became the President, CEO, and director general of Regideso.

Tshiongo served as Governor of the former Kasai-Occidental province from April 2006 to October 2006. He was elected to the National Assembly, representing the Dimbelenge Territory constituency in Kasaï-Central province. In February 2011, Tshiongo was appointed national Minister of Energy in the second cabinet of Prime Minister Adolphe Muzito, under President Joseph Kabila's administration.

Tshiongo died from an illness and COVID-19 in Kinshasa, Democratic Republic of the Congo, on 1 February 2021, at the age of 78.
