= Kasongo Ilunga =

Fictitious person in Congo government

Andre Kasongo Ilunga

Minister of Foreign Trade
- In office 5 February 2007 – 28 May 2007
- Preceded by: None

Personal details
- Born: 20 October 1972 (Democratic Republic of the Congo) Bukama, Democratic Republic of Congo
- Political party: UNAFEC
- Occupation: Vice-president of UNAFEC
- As this politician is not confirmed to actually exist, many of the above are disputed.

Andre Kasongo Ilunga (allegedly born 20 October 1972) was supposedly the Vice-President of the UNAFEC party and the Minister for Foreign Trade of the Democratic Republic of the Congo for much of 2007, despite doubts on whether or not he ever actually existed as a real person. Although a member of the UNAFEC party selected by Prime Minister Antoine Gizenga, he failed to appear at the opening of the new Government, and never claimed his office. As a result, Kasongo Ilunga is now considered by the local media and the international community to have been an imaginary person, most likely created by Kisimba Ngoy, leader of the UNAFEC party, as a part of a plan to win the lucrative role for himself.

Under government rules, a party must provide a short list of at least two candidates for any ministerial role, with the Prime Minister making the final choice from the list. The only two candidates put forward for the Foreign Trade post were Kasongo Ilunga and Kisimba Ngoy, with the list being compiled by Kisimba himself. However, Kisimba had been a vocal supporter of Mobutu Sese Seko, someone whom Antoine Gizenga had once strongly opposed, likely causing him to choose the unknown Ilunga over Kisimba. Kisimba denied these charges, claiming that Ilunga later declined the role for personal reasons, and that he had sent a signed letter to the Prime Minister tendering his resignation. Despite this, Gizenga refused to accept the resignation unless Ilunga resigned in person.

Kasongo Ilunga is a common name in the Democratic Republic of Congo, and at least three people claimed to be him. However, all of these people were denounced as impostors, as none of them had the correct background. The event damaged the reputation of the government, the first to be democratically elected in over 40 years, leading to the dismissal of Kisimba from the UNAFEC and the emergency election of a new party president.
