= Luzolo Bambi Lessa =

Emmanuel-Janvier Luzolo Bambi Lessa
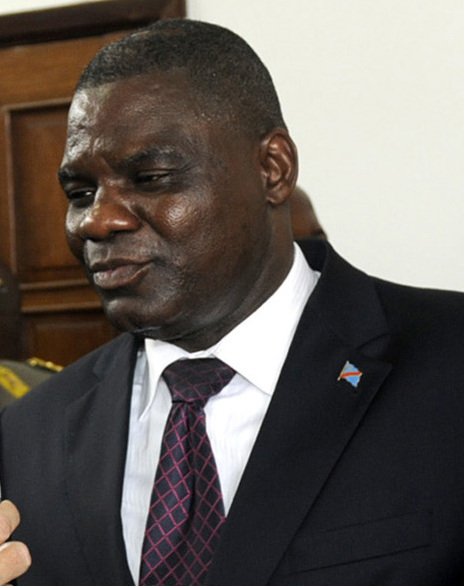

Minister of Justice
- Incumbent
- Assumed office October 2008
- Preceded by: Mutombo Bakafwa Nsenda

Personal details
- Born: 31 January 1958 (age 68)

Emmanuel-Janvier Luzolo Bambi Lessa (born 31 January 1958) is a politician in the Democratic Republic of the Congo. He was appointed Minister of Justice in the Muzito cabinet in October 2008.

== Birth and education ==
Luzolo was born on 31 January 1955 at Lisala. His parents were from the Bas-Congo Province. His father was a member of the armed forces of the Belgian Congo, then of the Congolese National Army. Luzolo attended schools run by the Fathers of Saint John the Baptist de la Salle in Lisala, Kinshasa and in Matadi. He then studied Law and Political Science, obtaining a law degree at the University of Kinshasa in 1985. He later attended the Institute of Criminal Science and Criminology of Aix-en-Provence and the University of Law, Economics and Political Science of Aix-Marseille III, where he obtained a Master in Law, Penal and Criminal Sciences in 1990 and a Doctorate in Law in 1996.

== Academic career ==
From 1986 Luzolo worked as a teaching assistant at the University of Lubumbashi, moving in 1988 to the University of Kinshasa where he was given the position of Legal Adviser to the Rector. In 2000 he was appointed Professor of judicial law at the Faculty of Law at the University of Kinshasa. He also held the offices of Secretary and Head of the Department of private law and justice. He became Head of the department of private law and the judicial law school of the Protestant University of Congo and of the University of Kisangani. He joined the Bar of the Court of Appeal Kinshasa / Gombe in 2000, and was chair of the Standing Committee of Congolese Law Reform from 2002 to 2003.

== Political career ==
Luzolo entered politics as a Research Officer in the Office of the Head of State, and was then appointed Deputy Commissioner General responsible for the reintegration of people displaced by the war. In 2004 he was appointed an advisor to the Administrative and Legal college. In this capacity, he played a key role in cooperation with between the DRC and the International Criminal Court, leading to the agreement on judicial cooperation between the DRC and the ICC (6 October 2005) and the Interim Agreement on the Privileges and Immunities of the ICC (12 October 2005).

Luzolo was appointed Minister of Justice on 26 October 2008, and was tasked with fighting against impunity in general, especially the impunity of corruption, sexual violence and acts against the freedom of citizens, as well as reform of justice. He convened the Supreme Judicial Council in January 2009 for the first time in fifteen years. He announced a program of competitive recruitment of judges, aiming at 250 in 2009, 500 in 2010 and 500 in 2011, with equal numbers of men and women. In June 2011 Luzolo Bambi launched a Handbook of Criminal Procedure adapted to the DRC, to replace the textbook by Paul Rubens published 46 years earlier. The DRC system of justice is based on that of France. After becoming Minister of Justice, Luzolo visited France and obtained promises of assistance in training both senior judges and prison officials.

In August 2010 Luzolo gave his support to "Operation Zero Tolerance", to bring to justice all wrongdoers whatever their status in the elite. In June 2011 Luszolo announced a program where people could make complaints about miscarriages of justice every Tuesday in the office of Minister of Justice and Human Rights. The program was aimed at eliminating a "two tier" system of justice by giving a vehicle for the poor to speak up. In August 2011 Luzolo presented a bill to parliament for creation of a special tribunal of foreign and Congolese judges to judge war crimes and crimes against humanity committed in the country since 1990.
