= Marie-Ange Lukiana Mufwankolo =

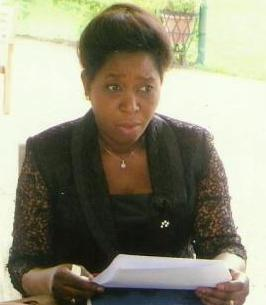
- Education: Graduate Institute of International and Development Studies in Geneva

Marie-Ange Lukiana Mufwankolo, born Mufwankolo, is an elected member of the National Assembly of the Democratic Republic of Congo who has also been a member of the Senate (Democratic Republic of the Congo) for Kinshasa. Previously, she was Minister of Gender, Women and Children in the governments of Adolphe Muzito and Minister of Labor and Social Welfare under Laurent-Desire Kabila and Gizenga Government.

== Biography ==
A graduate of the Graduate Institute of Development Studies in Geneva, Mufwankolo entered public service in 1987 as a staffer of the Democratic Republic of the Congo's (DRC) Ministry of Labor. In parallel, she remained active in DRC feminist circles, including as founder of the Union nationale des femmes. She has also been the deputy general secretary of the People's Party for Reconstruction and Development (PPRD). She was part of the parliamentary fact-finding committee that investigated the systematic expulsions of Congolese from Republic of Congo Brazzaville, from the Democratic Republic of Congo.
