= Leonard Mashako Mamba =

Leonard Mashako Mamba (March 15, 1951 – September 25, 2017) was a politician in the Democratic Republic of the Congo.

He was Minister of Health and close to Laurent-Désiré Kabila, and was with him on the day of Kabila's assassination on 16 January 2001. He left the government when the Transitional Government was installed in 2003, replaced by Dr. Jean Yagi Sitolo, former Governor of Orientale Province. He returned as Minister of Higher Education in the first and second Adolphe Muzito cabinets, holding this position as of September 2011.
