= Joseph-Davel Mpango Okundo =

Congolese politician

- Born: Zaire, now the Democratic Republic of the Congo
- Occupation: Politician

Joseph-Davel Mpango Okundo is a Congolese politician. On 25 November 2007, he was appointed as the Deputy Minister of Interior of the Democratic Republic of the Congo, under Antoine Gizenga's second cabinet that ran from 25 November 2007.
