= Didace Pembe Bokiaga =

Congolese politician

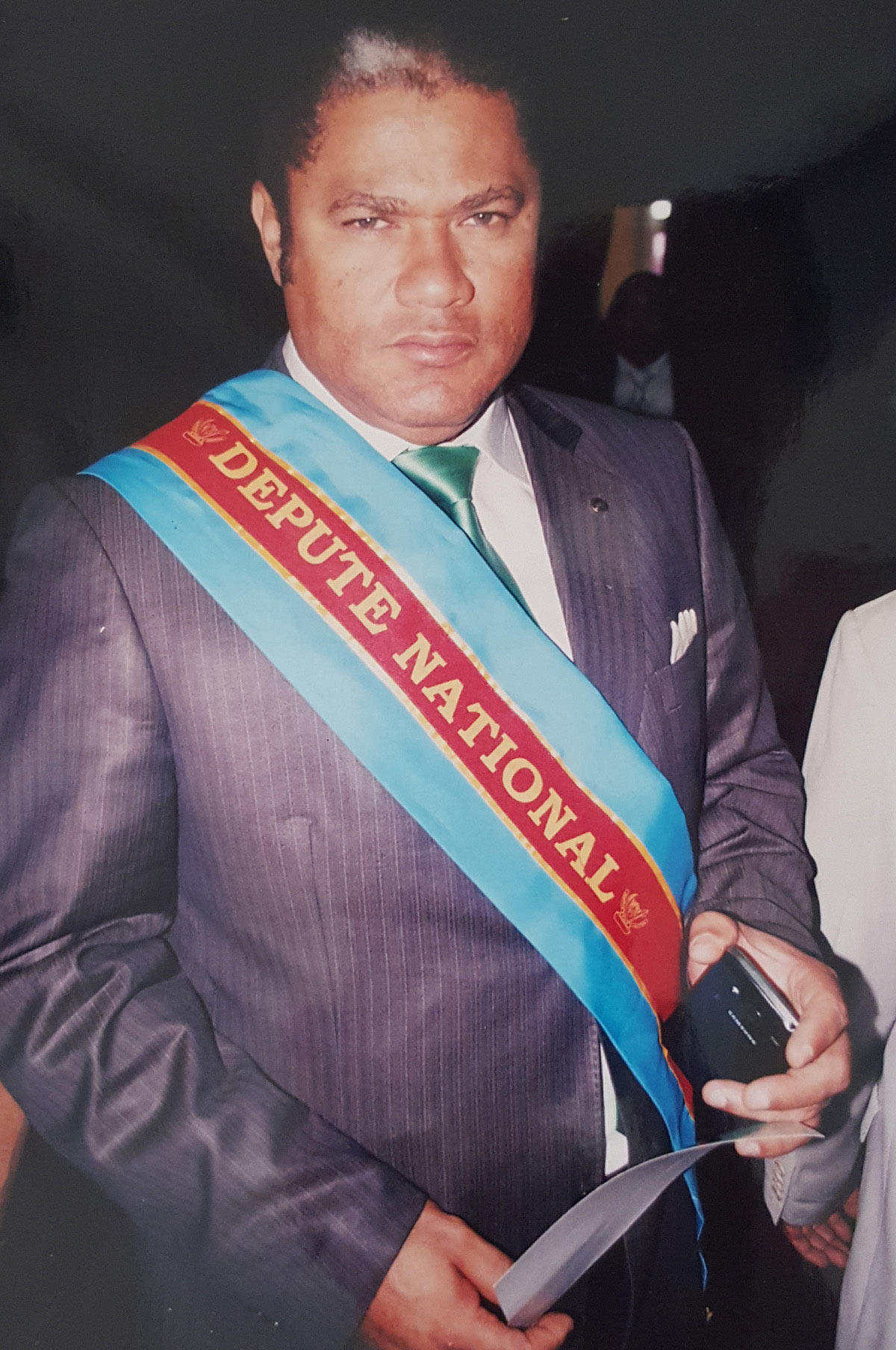
- Born: Zaire, now the Democratic Republic of the Congo
- Occupation: Politician

Didace Pembe Bokiaga (born 16 October 1962) is a Congolese politician. He was Minister of the Environment in the Gizenga 1 government in 2007. On three occasions, in 2006, 2011 and 2018, he was elected national deputy for the Mushie (Mai-Ndombe) constituency. A leading figure in ecology in the DRC, he is chairman of the Alliance of Congolese Ecologists party, which he co-founded in 2008 (formerly PECO). He is the member of Unified Lumumbist Party (ULP).

== Background ==
=== Early life ===
Didace Pembe Bokiaga was born in Kinshasa on 16 October 1962 to a Belgian father, Albert Lemlin and a Congolese mother, Pembe Kobialakia Véronique. At the beginning of the 1980s, he went to France to continue his studies and worked there for several years. He returned to live permanently in the Republic of Zaire in 1993. His wife Lina Pembe Bologna is the manager of Lina Boutiques in Kinshasa.

=== Education and training ===
In 1980, Didace Pembe obtained a state diploma, scientific humanities, option math-physics, at the school colony of Boma (Zaire - DRC). He went to study in France and in 1985 obtained a diploma in general university studies, applied mathematics and social sciences at the University of Paris-VIII, followed in 1986 by a licence from the University of Paris VIII1 in Micro-informatics applied to the human sciences (MIASHS) 2 option artificial intelligence and robotics.

In 1988, still at the University Paris VIII, he passed a master's degree in MIASHS, followed by a license in MIASHS, artificial intelligence and robotics option at the University Paris VIII.

In 1988 he obtained the status of systems engineer after a theoretical and practical course at the I.B.M. training centre. France, before passing a DESS in ethnomethodology and robotics in 1989 at the University of Paris VIII.

== Political career ==
At the end of 2002, Didace Pembe met Joseph Olenghankoy and later joined the FONUS party. He was appointed both as National Vice-President in charge of the supervision of the former Bandundu Province and as Special Adviser and Head of Missions to the National President of FONUS.

=== 2006-2011: Political career under Joseph Kabila ===
The first free presidential elections in the DRC since independence in 1960 were held on 30 July 2006. These were won by Joseph Kabila in the second round against Jean-Pierre Bemba. Parliamentary elections are held simultaneously with the presidential elections.

The PDC fielded 113 candidates for the national deputation and the PDC won 8 seats in the parliament. Didace Pembe was elected Member of Parliament for the Mushie (Maï-Ndombe) constituency3.

On 30 December 2006, President Joseph Kabila appointed Antoine Gizenga as Prime Minister, who then formed a new government comprising 59 members. Didace Pembe was appointed Minister for the Environment, Nature Conservation, Water and Forests on 5 February 20074. Prime Minister Antoine Gizenga reshuffled his government on 25 November 2007 (Gizenga II). In the Ministry of the Environment, Didace Pembe was replaced by the leader of the Christian Democratic Party, José Endundo. Pushed by his electoral base in Mushie, Didace Pembe announced his resignation from the PDC in June 20086.

Four months later, on 1 October 2008, Didace Pembe created a new party, the PECO (Congolese Ecological Party), of which he logically became the president. The party established offices in the various provinces of the DRC.

=== 2011-2018: Political career under Joseph Kabila 3 ===
On 28 November 2011, the only round of voting in the presidential election took place at the same time as the parliamentary elections (national deputies).

Joseph Kabila Kabange was officially proclaimed President of the Democratic Republic of the Congo on 16 December 2011. He won with 48.95% of the vote to Étienne Tshisekedi wa Mulumba's 32.33%.

The provisional results of the elections of the national deputies are published by the CENI on the night of 26 January 2012. PECO won a seat in Parliament with its President, Didace Pembe, elected in the Mushie (Maï-Ndombe) constituency.

With several other Members of Parliament, he formed the parliamentary group "REE: Reconstruction, Awakening and Ecology" of which he became the official rapporteur in the National Assembly.

=== 2019: political career under Félix Tshisekedi ===
The presidential, legislative and provincial elections were held on 30 December 2018. Félix Antoine Tshisekedi Tshilombo sworn in as President of the Republic on 24 January 2019 and took office the next day.

Didace Pembe Bokiaga was elected national deputy in Mushie constituency, Maï-Ndombe Province 10 for the third consecutive time (2006, 2011 and 2018).

From 4 to 6 December 2019, Didace Pembe was organizing the first Green Academy of Environmentalists of Africa in Kinshasa, in collaboration with the Green Forum, the Federation of African Greens (FEVA) and the Federation of Environmental Parties of Central Africa (FEVAC).
