= Government of the Democratic Republic of the Congo =

National cabinet

- Gouvernement de la république démocratique du Congo
- Central government
- Government seal

Overview
- Established: 18 February 2006 (Third Republic)
- State: DR Congo
- Leader: Prime Minister
- Appointed by: President of the Republic
- Main organ: Council of Ministers
- Responsible to: National Assembly
- Headquarters: Secrétariat Général à la Primature, Kinshasa

The Government of the Democratic Republic of the Congo, also known as the Cabinet, is the junior institution in the executive branch of the central authority governing the Democratic Republic of the Congo, the senior institution being the President of the Republic. The President is the head of state whereas the Prime Minister is the head of government.

== Description ==
Under Article 90 of the Constitution of the Third Republic, the government is composed of the Prime Minister, of ministers, of deputy ministers; and as the case may be, of deputy prime ministers, of ministers of state, and of minister delegates. The number of these ministers vary from one government to the next.

The government is headed by the Prime Minister, appointed by the President, from the political party, the group or the coalition that holds the majority of seats in the National Assembly, the lower chamber of Parliament.

The government is the effective executive arm of the state, in charge of all the country's main administration, in all the domains reserved to the central government by the constitution, and in all the domains in which the central government has concurrent jurisdiction with the provinces.

The government is accountable to the Parliament. Any individual member of the government, as well the entire government, can be censored by its lower-chamber, the National Assembly, through the vote of a motion of censure, or a motion of no-confidence. When the Prime minister is censured, the entire government is asked to step down.

== Current government ==
The current government is the Suminwa government, under the leadership of Prime Minister Judith Suminwa. Suminwa assumed office on 12 June 2024, and her cabinet was announced on 29 May 2024.

== Governments since 2003 ==
Government	Start Date	End Date
Transitional Government	1 July 2003	31 December 2006
First Gizenga government	30 December 2006	25 November 2007
Second Gizenga government	25 November 2007	10 October 2008
First Muzito government	26 October 2008	19 February 2010
Second Muzito government	19 February 2010	11 September 2011
Third Muzito government	11 September 2011	6 March 2012
Matata government	6 March 2012	7 December 2014
Second Matata government	7 December 2014	14 November 2016
Badibanga government	19 December 2016	9 May 2017
Tshibala government	9 May 2017	6 September 2019
Ilunga government	6 September 2019	26 April 2021
Lukonde government	26 April 2021	12 June 2024
Suminwa government	12 June 2024	Present

== See also ==
- Heads of state of the Democratic Republic of the Congo
- Prime Minister of the Democratic Republic of the Congo
