= Denis Mbuyu Manga =

Congolese politician

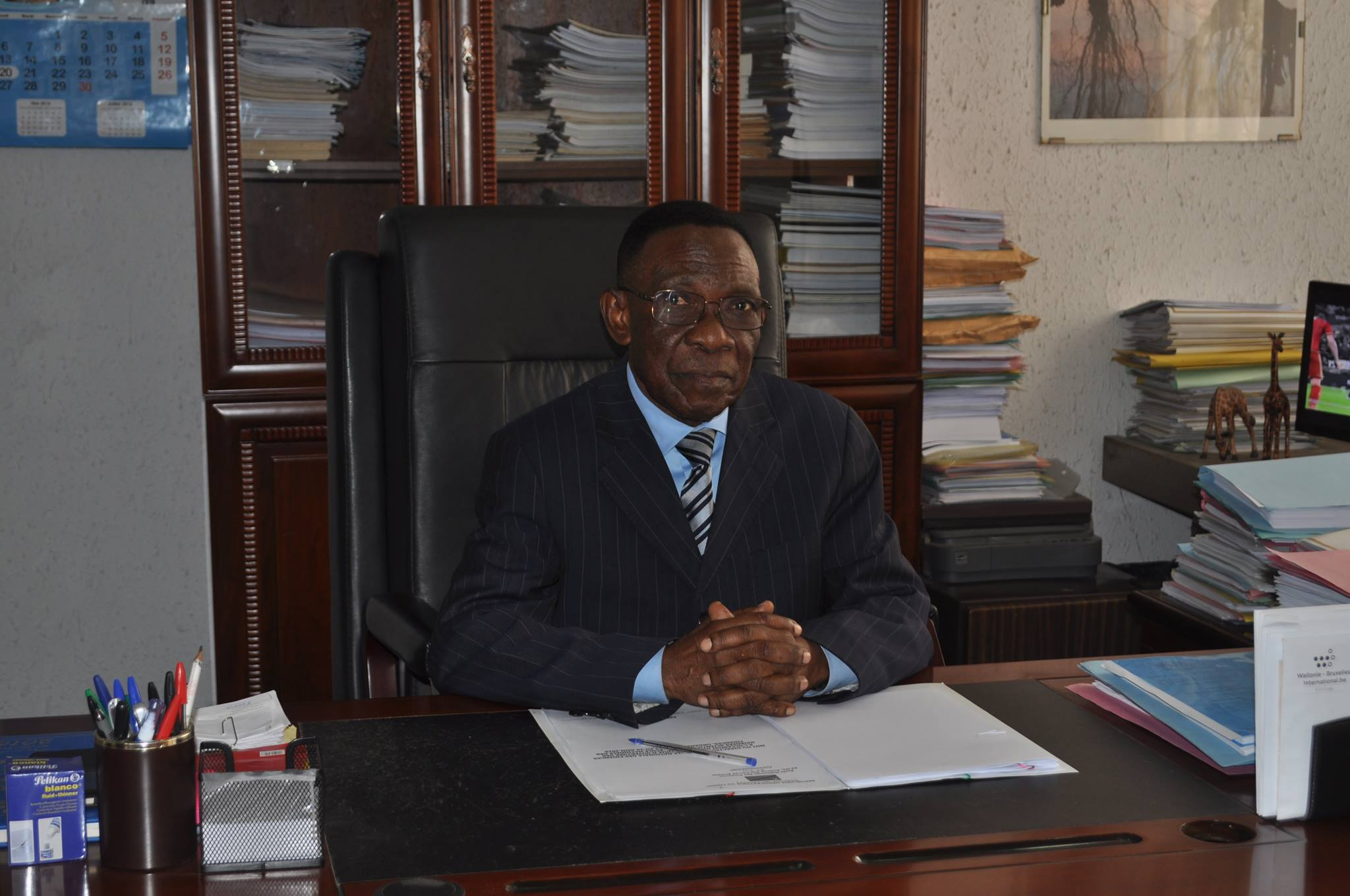

Ministry of Foreign Trade (Democratic Republic of the Congo)

Personal details
- Born: Zaire, now the Democratic Republic of the Congo
- Occupation: Politician

Denys Mbuyu Manga (born 20 November 1939) is a Congolese politician and a law professor. He was appointed on 28 May 2007 as a Minister of Foreign Trade by the President of the Democratic Republic of the Congo Joseph Kabila Kabange, a position he held until 10 October 2008. He is a member of Unified Lumumbist Party (ULP).

== Background ==
=== Early life and education ===
Manga was born on 20 November 1939 in Kabalo in the Katanga region of the Democratic Republic of the Congo. Apart from a series of participations in international forums, Manda has several diplomas including the Doctorate in law from the University of Paris II - Panthéon. He graduated from the Institute of Political Studies of Paris (IEP Paris) commonly known as Sciences Po Paris. Holds a specialist degree in labour law and sociology at the Free University of Brussels.

He also graduated in law from the Université libre de Bruxelles. He furthermore has a degree in public administration from the National School of Administration (ENA Kinshasa).

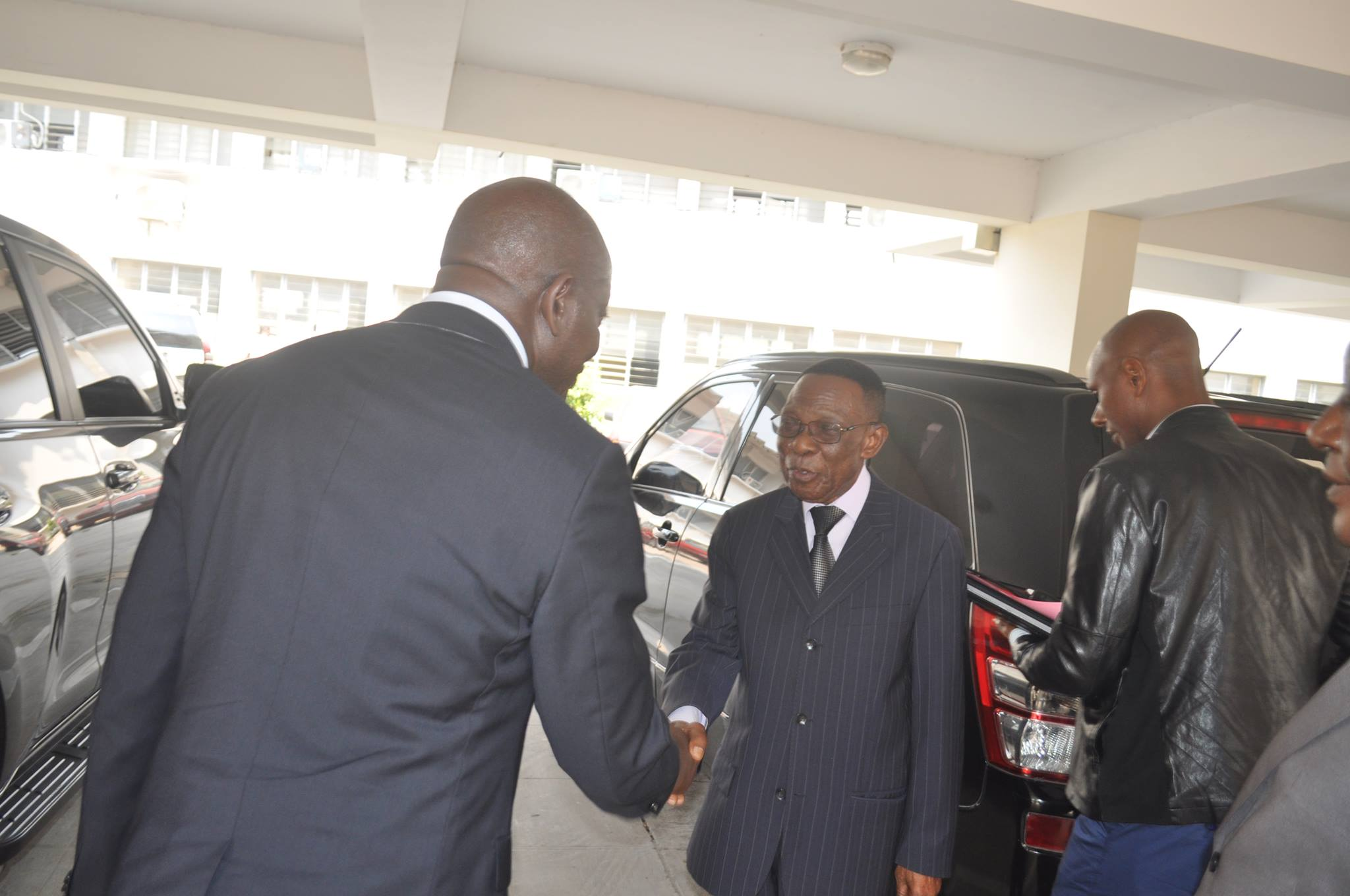
Mbuyu Manga Denys, DG ENF, and Mr Henri Yav Mulang, Minister for Finance.

== Political career ==
Since 1992, Munya has been the Director of the National School of Finance. In 2007, the President of the Democratic Republic of the Congo, Joseph Kabila, appointed him as the Minister of Foreign Trade in the Gizenka I then II government.

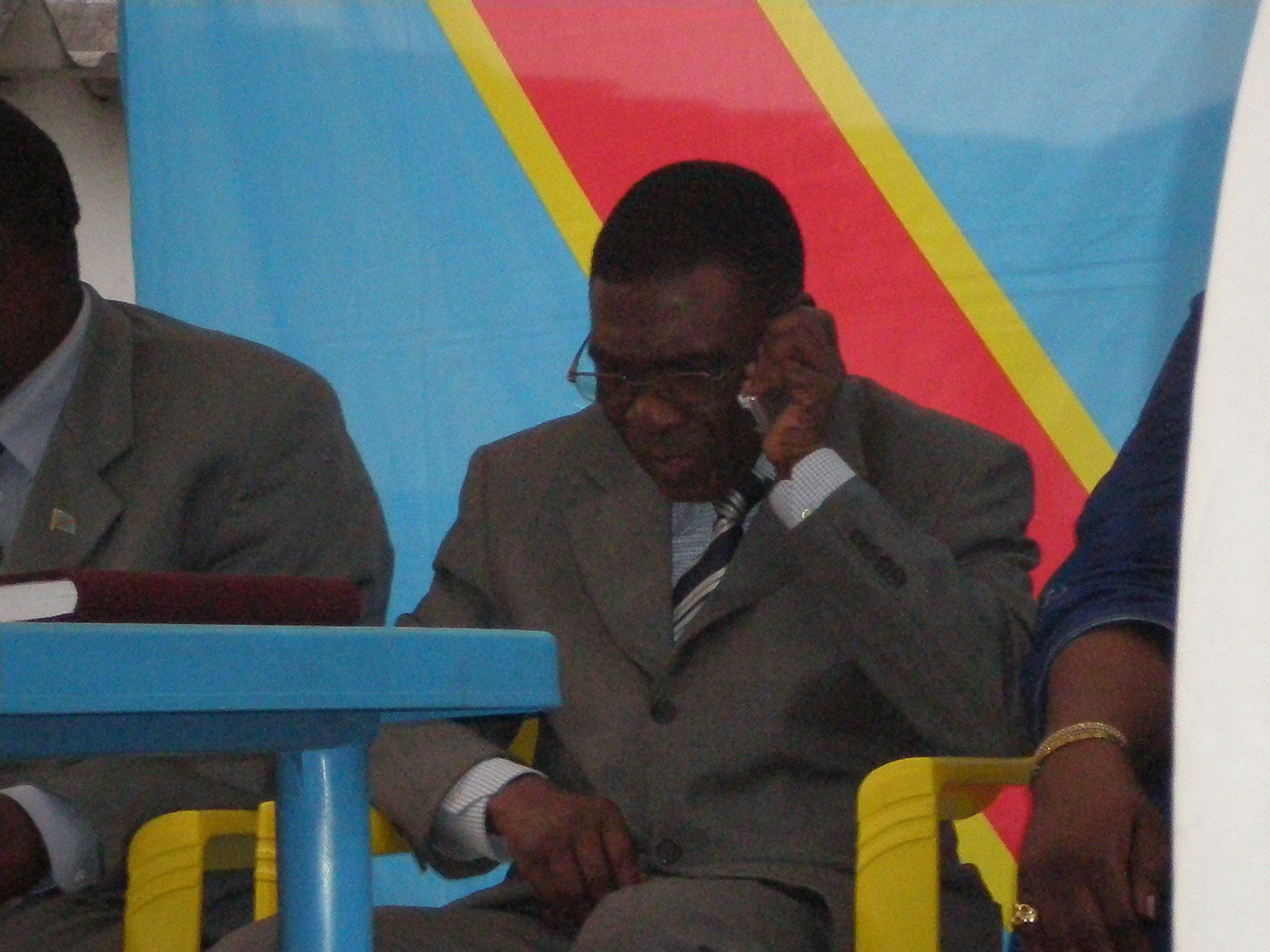
Mbuyu Manga Denys, Minister of Foreign Trade of the DRC

During his career Munya also held the following positions:

Head of recruitment office in the Ministry of Public Service.

- Professor of Law at the University of Lubumbashi and Vice Dean for Education.
- Professor at the Faculty of Social, Administrative and Political Sciences of the University of Lubumbashi.
- Director of the General Secretariat and Human Resources at the Central Administration of the Kilo-Moto Gold Mines Office in Kinshasa.
- Representative of Kilo-Moto in Brussels.
- Chief of Staff to the Minister of Land, Mines and Energy.

== Personal life ==
Denis Mbuyu Manga is married to Mbuyu Tshilomba Hélène. They have seven children: Patrick, Alphonse, Marguerite, Denis, Hélène, Nathalie and Jean-Luc Mbuyu, the founder of JLM Realty.
