= Eugene Lokwa Ilwaloma =

Congolese politician

- Born: Zaire, now the Democratic Republic of the Congo
- Occupation: Politician

Eugène Lokwa Ilwaloma is a Congolese politician. He was Minister of Human Rights in both Gizenga I and Gizenga II governments, from February 2007 to October 2008. He is a member of the Christian Democratic Party. He is a member of Unified Lumumbist Party (ULP).

== Background ==
=== Early life ===
Ilwaloma was born on 27 May 1934, in Coquilhatville (now Mbandaka), which was part of the Belgian Congo at the time (later became the Republic of the Congo, then Zaire, and is presently the Democratic Republic of the Congo). He is married to Madeleine Nsa Nyange who was also born in Mbandaka. They have eight children: four girls and four boys.

== Education ==
Ilwaloma studied law at the Free University of Brussels, where he earned his diploma with a distinction in 1970, after which he returned to Kinshasa with his wife and children, practicing as a lawyer near the Court of Appeal of Kinshasa in 1973.

He was appointed as vice-rector of the UNAZA in 1975. Ilwaloma became director general of the Institut Pédagogique National (IPN), before starting a political career in 1986. He paused his political career until 2007 and in 2008 he returned to Brussels.

== Death ==
On 10 December 2014 Ilwaloma died at the Saint Michel Etterbeek Hospital.
