= Colette Tshomba Ntundu =

Politician from the Democratic Republic of Congo

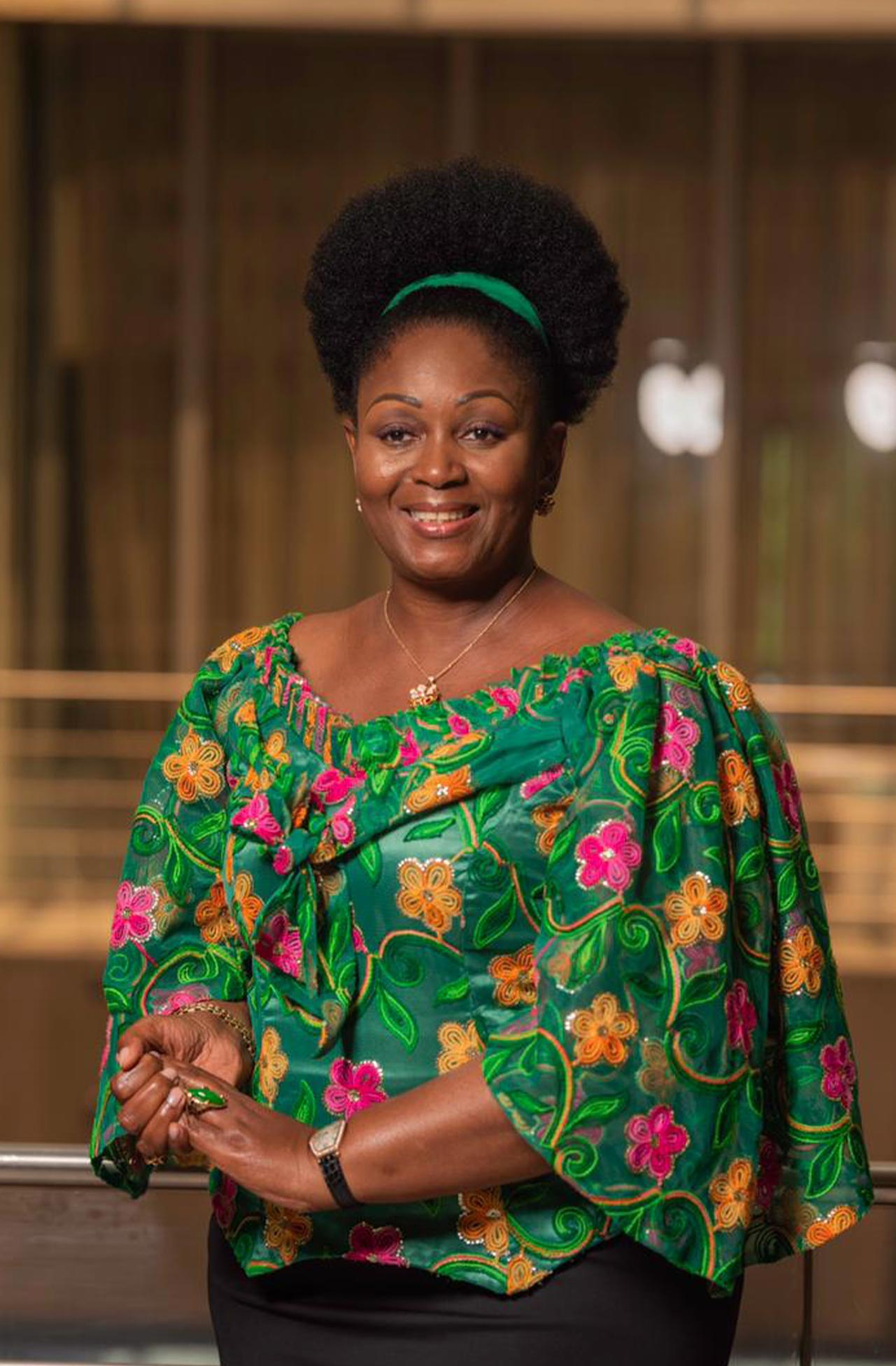
- Colette Tshomba Ntundu (2022)

Deputy Rapporteur of the National Assembly
- Incumbent
- Assumed office February 3, 2021

Member of the Congolaise des Voies Maritimes Board of Directors
- Incumbent
- Assumed office July 13, 2017

Deputy Minister for Congolese Abroad
- In office February 27, 2007 – September 11, 2011

National Deputy of Funa (Kinshasa II) Constituency
- Incumbent
- Assumed office 2006

Personal details
- Born: February 23, 1966 (age 60) Kinshasa, Democratic Republic of the Congo
- Children: 3

Colette Tshomba Ntundu (born February 23, 1966, in Kinshasa) is a politician from the Democratic Republic of Congo. She was elected national deputy for the constituency of Funa (Kinshasa II) three times, in 2006, 2011 and 2018.

== Education ==
In 2005, Colette Tshomba obtained a degree in journalism, domestic political option, at Institut Facultaire des Sciences de l'Information et de la Communication (IFASIC) in Kinshasa.

== Media career ==
In 1989, Colette Tshomba Ntundu joined Zairian national television (OZRT). She began as a tele-speaker before presenting the big 20-hour Journal Télévisé between 1993 and 1995.

She founded the UHURU newspaper in 2002 and the AWA magazine in 2004.

Since 2014, she is a doctoral student, teacher and researcher at IFASIC, Institut Facultaire des Sciences de l'Information et de la Communication in Kinshasa.

== Political career ==
The first free presidential elections in the DRC since independence in 1960 took place on July 30, 2006. These were won by Joseph Kabila in the second round against Jean-Pierre Bemba. Legislative elections are held at the same time as the presidential one. Colette Tshomba Ntundu was elected national deputy for the constituency of Funa (Kinshasa II) on the list of the Alliance party for the renewal of Congo led by Olivier Kamitatu.

Colette Tshomba leads mobilization actions that lead to the creation of the House of Congolese Abroad and Migrants (MCDEM) in February 2009. Solidarity fund establishments for Congolese have been opened in several African countries and health and funeral insurance are set up with SONAS.

Colette Tshomba Ntundu was Deputy Minister for Congolese Abroad in three successive governments between February 27, 2007, and September 11, 2011. She was Deputy Minister for Congolese Abroad on February 27, 2007, in the Antoine Gizenga I government. She was reappointed on November 25, 2007, in the Gizenga II government. She was reappointed on October 10, 2008, in the government of Adolphe Muzito I.

On November 28, 2011, the presidential elections were held in a first-past-the-post system. Joseph Kabila is re-elected against Étienne Tshisekedi. The legislative elections take place on the same day. Colette Tshomba Ntundu was re-elected national deputy for the constituency of Funa (Kinshasa II) on the list of the MIP party, Mouvement pour l'Intégrité du Peuple in the Mozaïque PPRD group.

Colette Tshomba Ntundu was appointed Member of the Board of Directors of the public company CVM, Congolaise des Voies Maritimes, by presidential order on July 13, 2017.

The presidential elections of December 30, 2018, were held at the same time as the legislative and provincial elections. Felix Tshisekedi is proclaimed winner of the presidential election ahead of Martin Fayulu and Emmanuel Ramazani Shadary. Colette Tshomba Ntundu was re-elected national deputy for the constituency of Funa (Kinshasa II) on the list of the MIP party, Mouvement pour l'Intégrité du Peuple in the FCC grouping, Front commun pour le Congo.

On February 3, 2021, Colette Tshomba Ntundu was elected by her peers to the post of deputy rapporteur of the National Assembly.

== Private life ==
Colette Tshomba Ntundu was born in Kinshasa on February 23, 1966, to a Congolese mother, Lydie-Esther Kaseka and a Congolese father, Jean-Marie Tshomba Kichoma (deceased in 1999).

Colette Tshomba is the mother of three children.

Colette Tshomba is the sister of Italian surgeon Yamume Tshomba of the Gemelli University Hospital Center in Rome. She is also the sister of Serge Kayembe, Congolese cultural columnist and former National Deputy.
