= Léonard Masuga Rugamira =

Congolese politician

- Born: Zaire, now the Democratic Republic of the Congo
- Occupation: Politician

Léonard Masuga Rugamira is a Congolese politician. On 25 November 2007, he was appointed as the Minister of Higher Education, Universities and Scientific Research of the Democratic Republic of the Congo, under Antoine Gizenga's second cabinet. He is the member of Unified Lumumbist Party (ULP).
