= Laurent-Simon Ikenge Lisambola =

Congolese politician

- Born: Zaire, now the Democratic Republic of the Congo
- Occupation: Politician

Laurent-Simon Ikenge Lisambola is a Congolese politician. He was Minister of Urban Planning and Housing in the Gizenga I government and Minister of Public Service in the Gizenga II government from February 2007 to October 2008.

He's a member of the MSR. In January 2019, he was elected as a National Deputy for Tshopo Province, Isangi Constituency. Lisambola is an alumnus of 'Protection and Promotion of Human Rights' (FY05). He is the coordinator of Civil Society in Orientale province.
