= 2012 Katanga Express Gulfstream IV crash =

Aviation accident in DR Congo

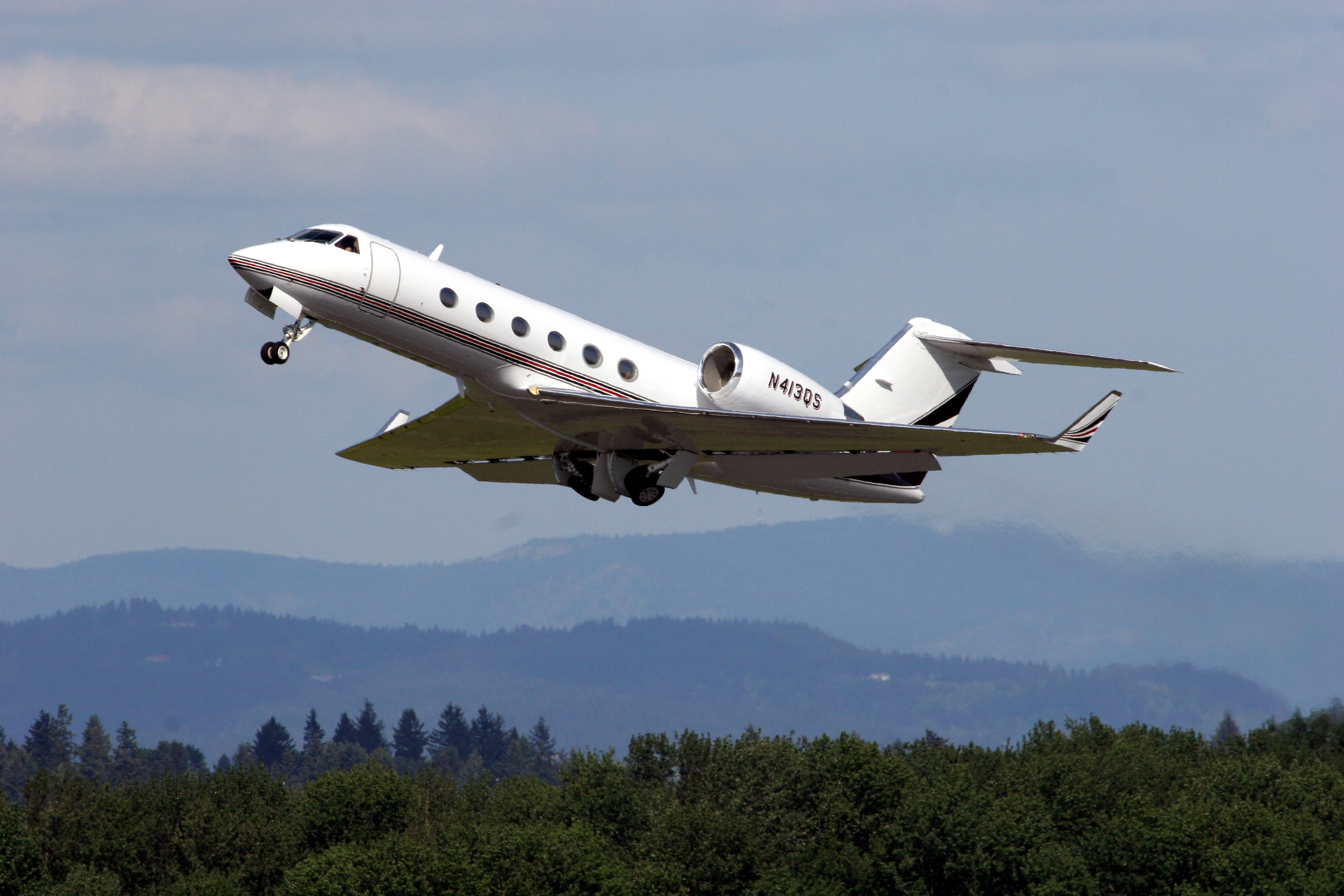
- A Gulfstream IV similar to the aircraft involved

Accident
- Date: 12 February 2012
- Summary: Runway excursion on landing due to Pilot error
- Site: Near Kavumu Airport, Bukavu, Democratic Republic of the Congo; 2.313°S 28.810°E
- Total fatalities: 6
- Total injuries: 5

Aircraft
- Aircraft type: Gulfstream IV
- Operator: Katanga Express
- Registration: N2SA
- Flight origin: Lubumbashi International Airport, Lubumbashi, DR Congo
- Destination: Kavumu Airport, Bukavu, DR Congo
- Occupants: 12
- Passengers: 10
- Crew: 2
- Fatalities: 4
- Injuries: 5
- Survivors: 8

Ground casualties
- Ground fatalities: 2

On 12 February 2012, a Gulfstream IV aircraft operated by Katanga Express crashed in a plantation approximately twenty metres from Kavumu Airport near Bukavu, Democratic Republic of the Congo while attempting to land. Both pilots and two passengers were killed in the crash. Two farmers near the impact site also died after being struck by the aircraft.

== Victims ==
Both the pilot and co-pilot were killed in the impact, along with two farmers on the ground. Two of the eight passengers were also killed: the former Governor of Katanga Province and President Kabila's closest advisor Augustin Katumba Mwanke and the ex-President Director General of OGEDEP (Office de Gestion de la Dette Publique) and national deputy for the district of Lukunga Oscar Dimageko Gema, who died of his injuries two weeks later.

Among the survivors was Finance Minister and future Prime Minister Augustin Matata Ponyo, who was seriously injured, and the roving ambassador of President Kabila and former Minister of Foreign Affairs Antoine Ghonda.

== Aircraft ==
The aircraft was a Gulfstream IV, part of a twin-jet series introduced in 1985 for private or commercial use. It was built and delivered in February 1990 to DWC & BV (Trustee) under the registration N600ML. One month later, it was re-registered as N700GD and subsequently used by three additional airlines until 2004. A year later, the registration changed to N2SA, under which it operated until the day of the accident. Over its operational lifetime, the jet was utilized by ten different companies.

Trident Airlines LLC, the final company to own the aircraft, acquired it approximately one year before the crash. The aircraft had been leased to Katanga Express, a charter airline based at Lubumbashi Airport, at the time of the accident

== Events ==
A private domestic flight departed from Kinshasa with an intermediate stop in Goma to board additional passengers and refuel. The aircraft carried twelve individuals, including two crew members and ten passengers. Upon arriving in Bukavu, it touched down approximately 1,200 meters along the airport's 2,000-meter runway but did not come to a stop. It continued beyond the runway's end, descended an embankment, and came to rest in a ravine. The aircraft broke into two sections and did not catch fire.

Photographs taken at the accident site indicate that the flaps were extended and thrust reversers on both engines were deployed.

== Aftermath ==
After the crash, the government of the Democratic Republic of the Congo's decided to suspend the license of Katanga Express while the Congolese and American teams investigated the cause of the crash.

Katanga Express was listed as an air carrier banned from the European Union ten months later, in December 2012.

== Investigation ==
The investigation revealed that the airplane touched down about 1,200 meters past the threshold of the 2,000 meter runway. The 800 meters left for the landing rollout was insufficient to safely land a Gulfstream IV.

=== Probable cause ===
The investigation determined that the flight crew did not maintain focus on the landing procedure during the approach phase, resulting in the aircraft being significantly above the intended glide path. Although reverse thrust was activated on both engines after touchdown, the spoilers were not deployed. The crew did not initiate a go-around or apply engine-and-air procedures. As a result, the aircraft overran the runway and crashed.

== See also ==
Aviation accidents and incidents
