= Louise Munga Mesozi =

Congolese politician

- Born: Zaire, now the Democratic Republic of the Congo
- Occupation: Politician

Louise Munga Mesozi is a Congolese politician. She was Minister of Posts, Telephones and Telecommunications in the Muzito government from October 2008 to 2012, then Minister of the Portfolio from 2012 to 2015 in the Matata government.

== Background ==
=== Early life ===
Mesozi was born in the Fizi territory in the south of South Kivu province.

=== Education ===
Mesozi graduated in law from the National University of Zaire in 1974. She then worked at the Union des banques zaïroises.

== Political career ==
In June 2007, Mesozi was the senior adviser to the Presidency of the Republic, in charge of good governance and the fight against corruption. On 25 November 2007, she was appointed as the Minister of Post, Telephones and Telecommunications of the Democratic Republic of the Congo, under Antoine Gizenga's second cabinet that ran from 25 November 2007. Mesozi is the member of Unified Lumumbist Party (ULP).

In June 2015, Chérubin Okende Senga, the former managing director of Congolese Airlines took on Mesozi as the Minister of the Portfolio.
