= Salomon Banamuhere Baliene =

Congolese politician

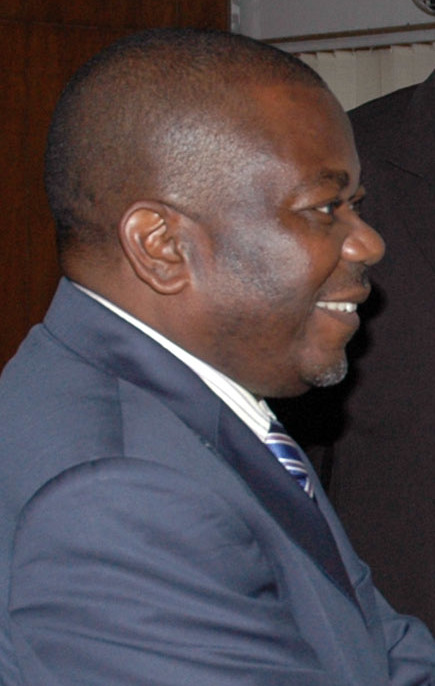

Congolese Minister of State and Minister of Decentralisation and Customs

Personal details
- Born: Zaire, now the Democratic Republic of the Congo
- Occupation: Politician

Salomon Banamuhere Baliene (born 20 April 1951) is a Congolese biologist and politician. He is a co-founder of the People's Party for Reconstruction and Democracy (PPRD).

== Background ==
=== Early life ===
Baliene was born on 20 April 1951 in Mwenda, North Kivu in Zaire, present-day the Democratic Republic of the Congo.

==== Education ====
Baliene studied at the National University of Zaire-Kisangani Campus and obtained a degree in biological sciences. He obtained a master's degree in environmental sciences at the Fondation universitaire luxembourgeoise in Arlon and a diploma in rural engineering at the ENGREF in Montpellier.

He entered the government of Laurent Désiré Kabila on 15 March 1999 as Minister of the Environment. He was appointed Minister of Land Affairs following the reshuffle of 14 April 2001. He is a co-founder of the People's Party for Reconstruction and Democracy (PPRD).

=== Political career ===
Baliene has worked as Minister of State for Decentralisation and Customs Affairs, Minister of Agriculture, Livestock and Fisheries, Minister of Land, Environment and Tourism and Ambassador to Burundi. He replaced Pierre Muzumba as Minister of Energy by Decree No. 5/159 of 18 November 2005 restructuring the transitional government. He retained his post in the government of Antoine Gizenga.

In September 2009, he was appointed Ambassador of the Democratic Republic of the Congo to Burundi.

He is the member of Unified Lumumbist Party (ULP).
