= Mutombo Bakafwa Nsenda =

Democratic Republic of the Congo politician

Governor of Kasai Occidental
- In office October 2006 – February 2007

Minister of Justice
- In office November 2007 – October 2008
- Preceded by: Georges Minsay Booka
- Succeeded by: Luzolo Bambi Lessa

Deputy Prime Minister for Security and Defense
- In office October 2008 – February 2010

Symphorien Mutombo Bakafwa Nsenda is a politician in the Democratic Republic of the Congo. In October 2008 he was appointed Deputy Prime Minister for Security and Defense in the first Adolphe Muzito cabinet.

Mutombo Bakafwa Nsenda is a licensed lawyer by profession. He entered practice in the 1970s. He was appointed Minister for Mines for a period. He was governor of the province of Kasai Occidental from October 2006 until February 2007. At the end of November 2007 he became Minister of Justice and Human Rights.

As Minister of Justice, in May 2007 he said that the reform of the justice system was well in hand, that a judicial inspectorate had been formed and that 4,000 judges would soon be hired. In October 2008 he was appointed Deputy Prime Minister for Security and Defense in the first cabinet of Prime Minister Adolphe Muzito. In August 2009 he spoke out against corrupt politicians who were inciting boundary disputes between the two Kasai provinces. The disputes, in which several people had died, were due mainly to artisanal mining of diamond deposits and to competition for arable land. He left Muzito's cabinet after the reshuffle of February 2010.
