= Matata Ponyo Mapon =

Congolese politician (born 1964)

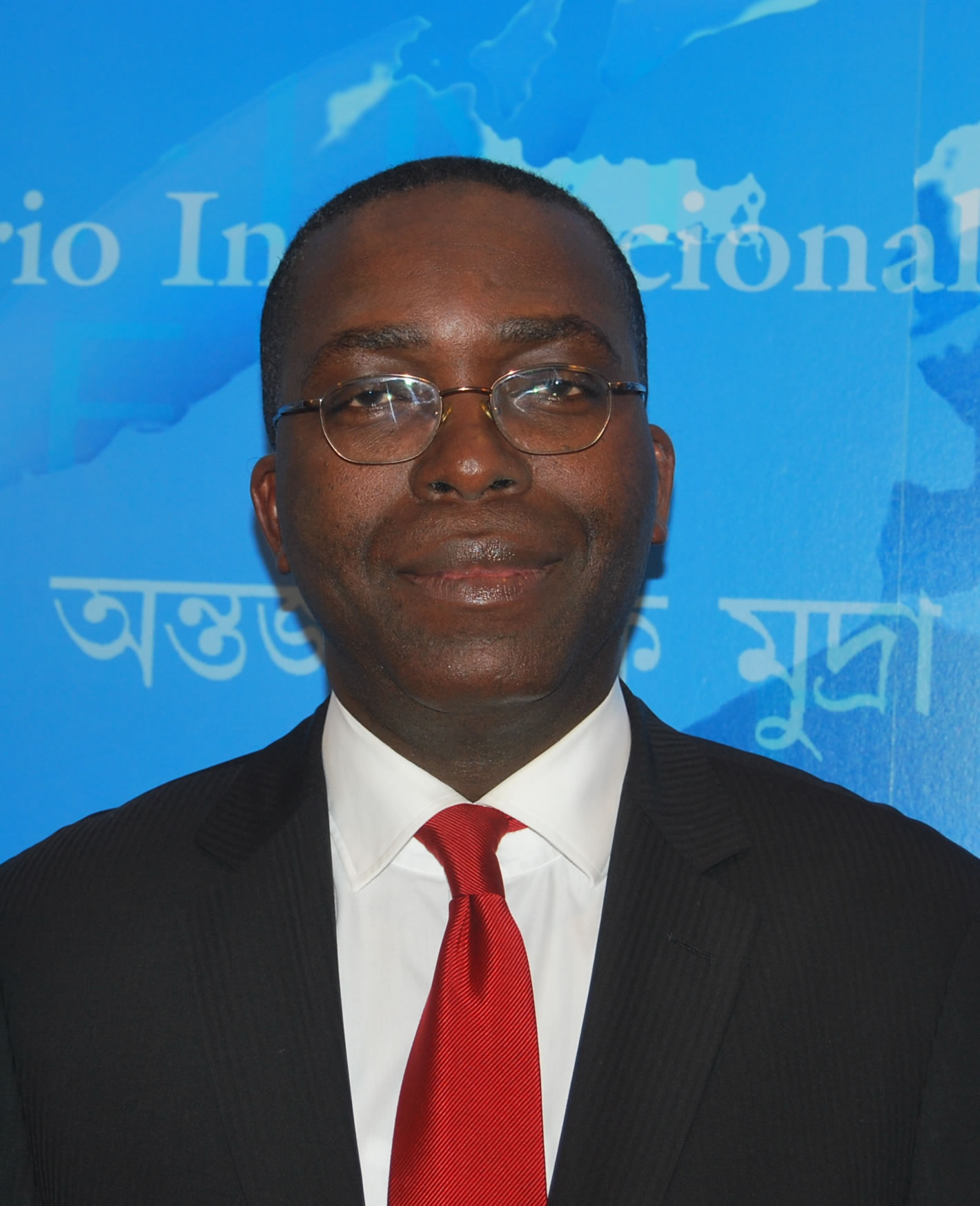

23rd Prime Minister of the Democratic Republic of the Congo
- In office 18 April 2012 – 17 November 2016
- President: Joseph Kabila
- Preceded by: Louis Alphonse Koyagialo (Acting)
- Succeeded by: Samy Badibanga

Minister of Finance
- In office 21 February 2010 – 12 April 2012
- Prime Minister: Adolphe Muzito; Louis Alphonse Koyagialo (Acting)
- Preceded by: Atanase Matenda
- Succeeded by: Patrice Kitebi

Personal details
- Born: 5 June 1964 (age 62) Maniema, Congo-Léopoldville (now Congo-Kinshasa)
- Education: University of Kinshasa

Matata Ponyo Mapon (born 5 June 1964) is a Congolese politician who served as the Prime Minister of the Democratic Republic of the Congo from 18 April 2012 to 17 November 2016. Previously he served as Minister of Finance from 21 February 2010 to 12 April 2012; as prime minister, he retained responsibility for the finance portfolio. He currently serves as Senator for Maniema. On 3 May 2022, he founded the political party Leadership and Governance for Development (Leadership et Gouvernance pour le Développement, LGD) and ran as its candidate in the 2023 presidential election.

In 2025 he was jailed for corruption.

== Biography ==
=== Early life and education ===
Matata Ponyo Mapon began his studies at Mwanga primary school (formerly Saint-Gaston) in 1970 in Kindu. He obtained his primary school certificate from Tuendelee school in 1976 in Kindu, his hometown. In 1983, he obtained his High school diploma from the Bwindi Institute in Bukavu and began his studies at the University of Lubumbashi, then at the University of Kinshasa where he graduated in economics in 1988.

In 2016, he started writing his doctoral thesis entitled "la qualité de l'ajustement budgétaire et croissance économique en RDC" (The quality of budgetary adjustment and economic growth in the DRC). In February 2018, he was proclaimed a doctorate in economics from the Protestant University in Congo where, since January 2019, he has been teaching courses in economic and major monetary issues in developing countries.

=== 2012 Katanga Express plane crash near the town of Bukavu ===
On 12 February 2012, while serving as Minister of Finance, Ponyo was seriously injured in a plane crash near the town of Bukavu. A Katanga Express Gulfstream IV business jet carrying several Congolese government officials overran the runway and crashed on landing at Kavumu Airport; two passengers and both crew members were killed.

== Career ==
=== 1988-2000: Executive at the Central Bank of Congo ===
Matata Ponyo worked at the Central Bank of Congo (BCC) as an economist, he is responsible for credit policy in the credit department, then money and national accounts in the studies department. He is a member of the Monetary Policy Committee and performs several training courses, notably at the Banque de France, the Central Reserve Bank of Peru, the International Monetary Fund, and in several other countries and institutions.

=== 2000-2010: Advisor to the Ministry of Finance and Director General of the BCECO ===
From 2000 to 2003, he worked as advisor to the Ministry of Finance in charge of macroeconomic issues and relations with international institutions. He worked closely on the creation of the Central Coordination Office (Bureau Central De Coordination - BCECO), of which he was appointed Director General in October 2003.

=== 2010-2012: Minister of Finance ===
In February 2010, he took over the Ministry of Finance. He successfully completed the first review of the economic program, that allows the Democratic Republic of the Congo to reach the completion point in June 2010 inducing the cancellation of around 10 billion dollars of the country's external debt.

In 2010, he launched a program to modernize and rejuvenate the financial administration through a recruitment and placement program for young Congolese academics, recruited on an extremely competitive basis. As minister of finance, he is the chairman of the African Caucus (an organization bringing together all finance ministers from sub-Saharan Africa to the International Monetary Fund and the World Bank) and Chairman of the Board of Governors of the ACA (African Trade Insurance Agency) based in Nairobi, Kenya.

On 18 April 2012, he was appointed as Prime Minister of the Democratic Republic of the Congo by President Joseph Kabila.

=== 2012-2016: Prime Minister ===
During his tenure as prime minister, the average annual inflation rate fell to 3% (sometimes the rate is below 1% per year) and the average annual economic growth is 7.7%. Matata Ponyo Mapon consolidated the banking system of public payroll and initiated reforms aimed at diversifying the economy, particularly in the agricultural sector. The Democratic Republic of the Congo was cited among the most reforming countries and the most dynamic economies in the world. It improved its rankings in the human development index published by the UNDP.

He resigned as Prime Minister of the Democratic Republic of the Congo on 14 November 2016, as part of an African Union-backed national dialogue framework agreement which specifies an opposition leader takes the position of prime minister.

=== 2018: Mission of the legislative elections in Togo ===
Appointed by the president of the Commission of the African Union to lead the observation mission of the legislative elections of December 20, 2018 in Togo, he has talks with the various stakeholders including, government officials and those in charge of the elections, candidates and political parties, representatives of civil society and the media. He supervises the deployment of observers in the various electoral districts of the country to monitor and evaluate the day of the election.

From February 2019, he carried out support missions for the Togolese government in the implementation, monitoring and evaluation of its vision for the development of the country as embodied in the National Development Plan of Togo.

=== 2020: Head of the Presidential Election Observation Mission in Guinea ===
In October 2020, Moussa Faki, President of the African Union Commission, appointed him as head of the Presidential Election Observation Mission (MOEUA) in Guinea. His delegation was made up of 25 observers including ambassadors accredited to the African Union, Pan-African parliamentarians, heads of electoral management bodies, civil society organizations and African academic institutions.

== Legal proceedings ==
=== Bukanga Lonzo agro-industrial park case ===
Matata Ponyo was accused in 2020 by the General Inspectorate of Finance of embezzlement of public funds of up to $205 million and criminal association during his tenure as Prime Minister. He is accused of having set up several companies controlled by his relatives for the management of the agro-industrial park of Bukanga Lonzo in Bandundu Province. The public prosecutor at the Constitutional Court requested the lifting of his parliamentary immunity while he in the meantime became a senator. The Senate rejected this request on 14 March 2021 because, according to the law, it was up to the prosecutor at the Court of Cassation to make the request.

In May 2021, the prosecutor at the Court of Cassation requested the lifting of the parliamentary immunity of Matata Ponyo so that he could be heard in this case. Senators refuse to comment on this request. Matata Ponyo stood trial before the Constitutional Court in this case on 25 October 2021.

On 15 November 2021, the court ruled in his favour, ruling that it cannot try him over the agriculture project's alleged mismanagement. His lawyer said he considered the case close, although the prosecution anticipated an appeal to other courts.

On 23 April 2025, the attorney general requested a prison sentence of 20 years at the Constitutional Court. Matata Ponyo rejected these charges and denounced what he called a politically motivated trial. On 20 May 2025, the Constitutional Court sentenced Matata Ponyo to 10 years of forced labor for the embezzlement of more than $245 million intended for the Bukangalonzo agro-industrial park project.

=== Case of compensation for victims of Zairianization ===
In 2011, while he was minister of finance, Matata Ponyo was responsible for compensating the victims of the Zairianization policy decreed by Mobutu Sese Seko in the 1970s. In July 2021, the prosecutor at the Constitutional Court obtained the lifting of the parliamentary immunity of Matata Ponyo to be able to question him in this case where he is suspected of embezzlement (to the tune of several million dollars). President Félix Tshisekedi is pushing for the Senate to lift Matata Ponyo's immunity.

He was heard by the prosecution at the Constitutional Court and placed under a provisional arrest warrant on 13 July before being placed under house arrest.

== Books ==
- 1999 : L'espace monétaire kasaïen - Crise de légitimité et de souveraineté monétaire en période d'hyperinflation au Congo, 1993-1997; L'Harmattan in Paris (France).
- 2016 : Pour un Congo émergent, Privé Publishing in Paris (France).
- 2016 : Qualité des institutions et résultats économiques en République démocratique du Congo : 1980-2015, L'Harmattan, Kinshasa (DRCongo).
- 2016 : Recueil des discours du ministre des Finances, Michel Lafon Publishing, Paris (France).
- 2018 : Plaidoyer pour la bonne gouvernance et le développement, Michel Lafon Publishing, Paris (France).

== Recognition ==
=== Honorary degrees ===
- Honorary Doctorate by the faculty of economics at Protestant University in the Congo (Kinshasa, 2016).
- Honorary Doctorate from the University of Kindu (Kindu, 2017).
- Global sponsor of education by the Global Partnership for Education (GPE) in Brussels in 2014 for his interest and attention given to the education sector.

== Personal life ==
Matata Ponyo is married to Hortense Katchoko Mbonda and is the father of four children.

Political offices
Preceded by Atanase Matenda	Minister of Finance; 2010–2012	Succeeded by Patrice Kitebi
Preceded by Louis Alphonse Koyagialo; Acting	Prime Minister of the Democratic Republic of the Congo; 2012–2016	Succeeded by Samy Badibanga
