= Emile Bongeli =

Congolese politician

Emile Bongeli Ye Ikelo Ya Ato

Deputy Prime Minister for Reconstruction
- In office October 2008 – February 2010

Personal details
- Born: 19 October 1952 (age 73) Stanleyville, Belgian Congo
- Citizenship: Democratic Republic of the Congo
- Party: People's Party for Reconstruction and Democracy

Emile Bongeli Yeikelo Ya Ato (born 19 October 1952) is a politician in the Democratic Republic of the Congo (DRC). In the first cabinet of Adolphe Muzito, from October 2008 to February 2010, he was Deputy Prime Minister for Reconstruction.

== Academic career ==
Emile Bongeli Yeikeo Ya Ato was born on 19 October 1952 in present-day Kisangani.

Bongeli's doctoral thesis was a critique of university education in developing countries. He has written about strategies to fight poverty, to find a new Bretton Woods system to prevent the constant changes that have created insecurity and misery for all. His writings try to discover, through history and anthropology, why the Congolese are unable to create a reasonable form of citizenship. He has taught sociology at the University of Kinshasa, and at the Faculty of Information and Communication Sciences at the University of Kisangani.

In 2011 Bongelie published a book on "Globalization, the West and the Congo - Kinshasa". In the book, he discusses the old problems of colonialism, the more recent growth of US hegemony, and their negative impact on the Congo. He goes on to describe the shift in power, and the rise of China. He calls for new policies based on the modern reality of a world where China, India and other "developing" countries must also be taken into consideration.

== Political career ==
Bongeli is a member of the People's Party for Reconstruction and Democracy (PPRD). He was Minister of Health during the transition after the Second Congo War. Emile Bongeli was elected National Deputy for the constituency of Kisangani on the PPRD slate. He was appointed Minister of Communication and Media in the second Antoine Gizenga cabinet.

As Deputy Prime Minister in charge of Reconstruction, in December 2008 he spoke enthusiastically of the potential of the Moto gold mines project near the town of Watsa to provide both direct and indirect benefits to the country. The project is a partnership between Borgakin, the DRC subsidiary of the Canadian company Moto Gold Mines, and the office of goldmines of Kilomoto. On 16 December 2009 Bongeli opened a meeting at People's Palace in Kinshasa to launch the National Forum on the fight against corruption. He spoke of the shame felt by the DRC to be rated the most corrupt country in the world, and reaffirmed the commitment of his government to fight this scourge that plagues Congolese society as a whole.

In August 2011 Emile Bongeli was national secretary in charge of Communication for the PPRD in the run-up to the elections. He said that his party was in good shape. Talking of the elections, he said the PPRD was preparing to rebuild the country while the main opposition Union for Democracy and Social Progress (UDPS) was preparing to challenge the election results.

== Bibliography ==
- Emile Bongeli Yeikelo ya Ato (2011). La Mondialisation, L'Occident et le Congo-Kinshasa. Editions L'Harmattan. ISBN 2-296-56064-4.
