= Victor Makwenge Kaput =

Congolese politician

Ministry of Public Health (Democratic Republic of the Congo) and Congolese Minister of Public Health

Personal details
- Born: Victor Makwenge Kaput; Zaire, now the Democratic Republic of the Congo
- Occupation: Politician

Victor Makwenge Kaput is a Congolese politician. He was Minister of Public Health of the Democratic Republic of the Congo in both Gizenga I and Gizenga II governments, from February 2007 to October 2008, and in the Muzito II government, from 19 February 2010. He is a member of the People's Party for Reconstruction and Democracy. Antoine Gizenga's first government ran from 25 November 2007.
