= Athanase Matenda Kyelu =

Congolese politician

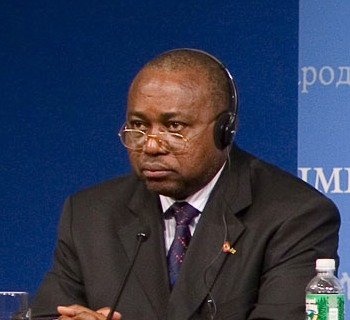
- Born: Zaire, now the Democratic Republic of the Congo
- Occupation: Politician

Athanase Matenda Kyelu is a Congolese politician. From November 2007 to February 2010, he was Minister of Finance in the Gizenga I, Gizenga II and Muzito I governments. Matenda is a member of Unified Lumumbist Party (ULP).

== Background ==
=== Early life and education ===
Matenda is a graduate in applied economics from the University of Kinshasa in DRC.

== Career ==
Matenda was the deputy director of the Federation of Congolese Enterprises (FEC) until 2003. He is a member of the Transitional National Assembly on the civil society list. He then served as Minister of the Civil Service in the transitional government. Prior to his appointment to the Gizenga government, Matenda was a national deputy for the Pangi constituency in Maniema.

In 2013, he defended a doctoral thesis in law under the direction of Jean-Claude Martinez.

In 2021, Matenda led the political party Alliance of Builders for an Emerging Congo. The party joined the Sacred Union of the Nation, the National Assembly coalition that supports President Félix Tshisekedi.
