= José Endundo Bononge =

José Endundo Bononge (born 8 August 1943) is a politician born in Équateur province in the Democratic Republic of the Congo (DRC). He is the chairman of the Christian Democratic Party (Parti Démocrate Chrétien – PDC) and was elected MP for the constituency of Mbandaka.

== Biography ==
Endundo was born on 8 August 1943 in Tondo in Bikoro Territory in Équateur province. He is a pharmacist by training and has held various positions in government departments in the DRC, including the Congolese Control Office (formerly OZAC) and the Office of Roads. He also served as the President of the Franco-Zaïroise Chamber of Commerce.

Endundo briefly joined the Rally for Congolese Democracy (RCD) before joining the Movement for the Liberation of the Congo (MLC) of Jean-Pierre Bemba. He became one of the most influential players within the MLC and was appointed Minister of Public Works and Infrastructure when the Transitional Government was established. However, he left that post after a parliamentary committee accused him of corruption.

He joined other politicians to form a new political party called the National Union of Christian Democrats (UNADEC), with Léon Engulu as its president. After differences of view within the party leadership, he formed the Christian Democratic Party (PDC).

Endundo is also a member of the political bureau for Together for Change, an opposition political coalition formed by former Katanga governor Moïse Katumbi to support his presidential bid in the upcoming 2018 presidential election.
