= Adolphe Lumanu =

Congolese politician

Adolphe Lumanu Mulenda Bwana N’sefu, born on 5 September 1952 in Kabinda, Lomami Province, Democratic Republic of the Congo, is a politician.

Adolphe Lumanu was born in the Kabinda District. He became a professor of Political Science. He was elected a national deputy for the electoral district of Kabinda. He was also director of the office of the Secretary General of the Parti du Peuple pour la Reconstruction et la Démocratie (PPRD) led by Vital Kamerhe. He was Deputy Governor of Kasaï Oriental during the transition to democracy after the Second Congo War. As of 11 September 2011 he was Deputy Prime Minister responsible for Interior and Security.

== Political career ==
Elective mandate:

- Elected National Member of the Constituency of Kabinda in the Lomami Province (January 2019 to date), 3rd term;
- Elected National Member of the Constituency of Kabinda in the former Province of Kasaï Oriental (April 2012 to October 2014), 2nd legislature;
- First Vice-President of the Parliamentary Group of the PPRD (GP-PPRD) in the National Assembly (Oct. 2006 - Nov. 2007)
- Elected National Member of the Constituency of Kabinda in the former Province of Kasaï Oriental (22 September 2006 to 25 November 2007), 1st legislature.

Apart from these functions, he has assumed the following technical and political functions:

- First Vice-President of the National Council for monitoring the Agreement of 31 December 2016 (CNSA in acronym);
- Director General of the National Office of Population Identification (ONIP acronym) since October 15, 2014 (Ordinance No. 14/067 of October 15, 2014);
- Deputy Prime Minister, Minister of the Interior, Security, Decentralization and Territorial Planning (Ordinance n ° 11/0 of September 11, 2011): from September 11, 2011 to February 2012,
- Minister of the Interior and Security: from February 19, 2010 to September 11, 2011,
- Director of the President of the Republic: from January 31, 2009 to February 19, 2010,
- Minister of Relations with Parliament: from 25 November 2007 to 31 January 2009. At the same time he is Rapporteur of the Alliance of the Presidential Majority (AMP)
- Coordinator of the Office of Studies, Strategies and Actions of the PPRD (2004 to 2006)
- Vice-Governor in charge of Economic, Financial and Development Issues of Kasaï Oriental Province: November 19, 2001 to May 16, 2004
- Deputy Minister of the Interior in charge of Territorial Affairs and Customary Affairs: from 3 January 2001 to 14 April 2001
- Deputy National Director of the Mines and Hydrocarbons Police of the Congolese National Police (February 1998 - December 1999)
- Counselor at the Political and Diplomatic College in the Office of the President of the Republic: 1992-1997
- Director of the Minister of Land Affairs (April - Oct. 1992)
- Director of the Office of the Minister of Relations with Parliament (Dec. 1991 - April 1992)
- Political Advisor to the Minister of Justice and Attorney General, Rights and Freedom of Citizens (Oct. - Dec. 1991)
- Senior Advisor and Head Study Cell Coordinator at the Ministry of Relations with Parliament (August 1990 - October 1991),
- Expert at the Kinshasa Political Conclave: 1993,
- Delegate of Higher and University Education at the National Sovereign Conference (CNS): 1991-1992.

== Academic career ==
Adolpe Lumanu holds a doctorate in political and administrative sciences.

Adolphe Lumanu teaches political science courses at the Universities of Lubumbashi, Kisangani, as well as the Catholic Faculties of Kinshasa. He is a specialist in Congolese politics. In this capacity, he teaches constitutional law and political institutions, Congo's political history, comparative politics and political communication.

As for the technical-commercial and administrative functions, Adolphe Lumanu has climbed almost every level at the university level. Ordinary Professor, Director of the Cell of Political and Administrative Studies (CEPA) of the Interdisciplinary Center for Studies and Social Documentation (CIEDOS) of the University of Kinshasa. He is a consultant to the newspaper of the National Debate, from which came the idea "National Dialogue or Inter-Congolese Political Negotiations". He has to his credit several scientific publications. He has benefited from several internships, missions, trips, training seminars organized around the world.
