= Adolphe Muzito =

Congolese politician (born 1957)

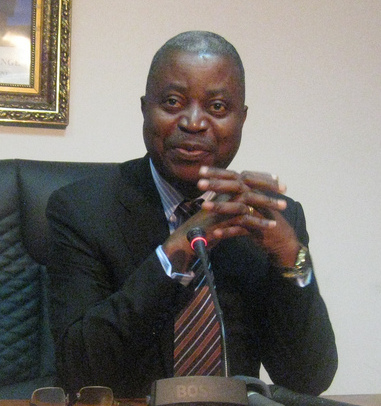

22nd Prime Minister of the Democratic Republic of the Congo
- In office 10 October 2008 – 6 March 2012
- President: Joseph Kabila
- Deputy: Nzanga Mobutu; Emile Bongeli Yeikolo Yaato; Mutombo Bakafwa Nsenda; Louis Alphonse Koyagialo
- Preceded by: Antoine Gizenga
- Succeeded by: Louis Alphonse Koyagialo (Acting)

Personal details
- Born: 12 February 1957 (age 69) Gungu, Belgian Congo (now Democratic Republic of the Congo)
- Party: PALU

Adolphe Muzito (born 12 February 1957) is a Congolese politician who was Prime Minister of the Democratic Republic of the Congo from 2008 to 2012. Muzito, a member of the Unified Lumumbist Party (PALU) until 2015, was Minister of the Budget under Prime Minister Antoine Gizenga from 2007 to 2008. He leads the opposition political party New Momentum (Nouvel Élan, NOU.EL).

Hailing from Gungu, Kwilu District, Muzito is an economist. In the government that was appointed on 5 February 2007, Muzito was included as Minister of the Budget. After Gizenga, the leader of PALU, resigned as Prime Minister on 25 September 2008 for reasons related to age and health, Muzito was appointed as his successor by President Joseph Kabila on 10 October 2008.

Muzito's government was appointed on 26 October 2008. Aside from Muzito himself, it included 53 members: three deputy prime ministers, 36 ministers, and 14 deputy ministers. The government was dominated by members of the People's Party for Reconstruction and Democracy, and Kabila described it as "combat team to which has been assigned the essential missions of security and reconstruction".

Muzito resigned as Prime Minister on 6 March 2012.

On 24 February 2015, former Belgian minister Serge Kubla was arrested on suspicion of bribing Adolphe Muzito.

In 2015, Muzito was suspended from PALU for three years after publishing critical comments about the running of the country, which were viewed as being contrary to the party's interests as part of the governing majority and as a form of insubordination.

In 2025, Muzito was appointed as deputy prime minister for budget.

== See also ==
- Adolphe Muzito cabinet

Political offices
Preceded by Antoine Gizenga	Prime Minister of Congo-Kinshasa; 2008–2012	Succeeded by Louis Alphonse Koyagialo; Acting
