= Antoine Gizenga =

Prime minister of DR Congo (2006–2008)

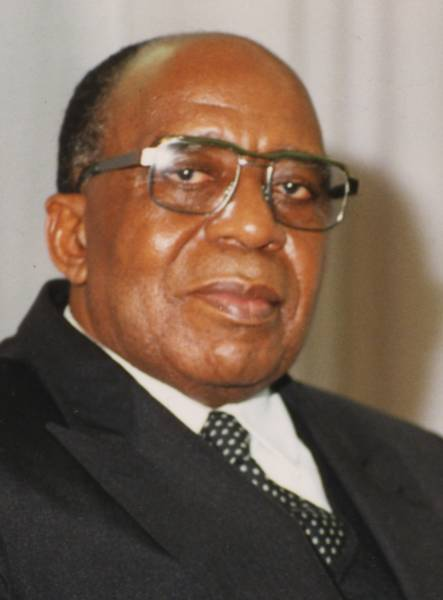
- Gizenga in 2009

21st Prime Minister of the Democratic Republic of the Congo
- In office 30 December 2006 – 10 October 2008
- President: Joseph Kabila
- Preceded by: Likulia Bolongo (1997, as Prime Minister of Zaire)
- Succeeded by: Adolphe Muzito

Deputy Prime Minister of Congo-Léopoldville
- In office 24 June 1960 – 14 September 1960
- Preceded by: Office established
- Succeeded by: Jean Bolikango

Prime Minister of Congo-Stanleyville
- In office 12 December 1960 – 5 August 1961
- Preceded by: Office established
- Succeeded by: Office abolished

Personal details
- Born: 5 October 1925 Mbanze, Belgian Congo (now Kwilu, Democratic Republic of the Congo)
- Died: 24 February 2019 (aged 93) Kinshasa, Democratic Republic of the Congo
- Party: PALU; PSA

Antoine Gizenga (5 October 1925 – 24 February 2019) was a Congolese politician and statesman who served as the prime minister of the Democratic Republic of the Congo from 30 December 2006 to 10 October 2008. He was the secretary-general of the Unified Lumumbist Party (PALU).

== Early life ==
Antoine Gizenga was born on 5 October 1925 in the small village of Mbanze in present day Kwilu province in what was then the Belgian Congo. He attended a Catholic missionary primary school and received his secondary education at the Kinzambi and Mayidi seminaries. He became an ordained Catholic priest in 1947 and led a parish out of his home in Kwilu. He left his position for personal reasons and took several clerical and accounting jobs. After briefly serving in law enforcement for the colonial government, Gizenga became a teacher at a secondary Catholic school. He soon thereafter married Anne Mbuba, with whom he later had four children.

== Early political career ==
Inspired by the nationalist and Pan-Africanist ideas of Patrice Lumumba, the co-founder of the Mouvement National Congolais, Gizenga helped to organize the Parti Solidaire Africain (which was openly left leaning). He later became the leader of the party. Following independence and free elections in 1960, Gizenga became Lumumba's deputy prime minister of the new Republic of the Congo.

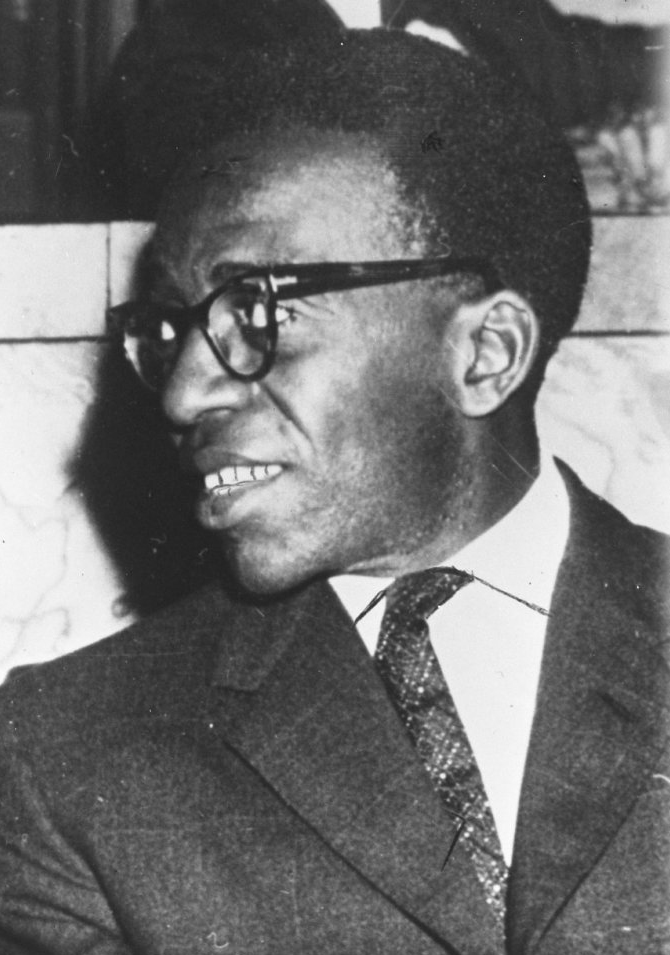
Gizenga in 1961

In September, President Joseph Kasa-Vubu dismissed Lumumba and Gizenga from their positions for the former's decision to involve the Soviet Union in the Congo Crisis. Lumumba protested, and the government went into a deadlock over the issue. A coup launched shortly thereafter by Colonel Joseph Mobutu politically incapacitated both Lumumba and the President, though Mobutu soon developed a working relationship with the latter. Gizenga objected to the new government and left for Stanleyville on 13 November to form his own. On 12 December, he declared his government, the Free Republic of the Congo, to be the legitimate ruling authority in the Congo. Lumumba had attempted to join him, but was arrested and eventually executed in the State of Katanga in January 1961. Gizenga's government persisted for half the year and garnered diplomatic recognition from the Soviet Union, China, and Egypt, though it received no logistical support.

In August, Gizenga agreed to rejoin the regular Congolese government as deputy prime minister, now under the leadership of Cyrille Adoula. Aside from his reinstatement ceremony, he chose to stay out of Léopoldville and remained in Stanleyville. Gizenga soon realized that Adoula was under the influence of Western governments and willing to negotiate with rebel leader Moise Tshombe. He denounced Adoula and declared that the government was committing treason.

In January 1962 the Congolese Assembly demanded that Gizenga return to Léopoldville to hear charges levied against him for leading a rebel government. He replied that he would only come back when the Katangan secession was resolved. Gizenga then attempted to arrest Armée Nationale Congolaise Commander-in-Chief Victor Lundula and a UN official, both of whom were in Stanleyville to investigate the Kindu atrocity. The plan backfired when Gizenga's militiamen refused to obey his orders. Clashes between his regular supporters and Congolese soldiers ensued, resulting in several deaths. United Nations Secretary General U Thant ordered peacekeeping troops to restore order in Stanleyville, while Adoula had Gizenga placed under house arrest by UN and Congolese troops. He was flown back to Léopoldville via UN aircraft and detained at Camp Kokolo.

Gizenga turned down an offer of UN protection and was eventually imprisoned on the island Bula Mbemba which lies in the mouth of the Congo River. In July 1964 Tshombe became prime minister and, as part of an attempted political reconciliation, ordered Gizenga's release. In spite of this, Gizenga quickly organised a Lumumbist party and denounced Tshombe's handling of the Simba rebellion. As a result, Gizenga was placed under house arrest in September. Mobutu seized power in a coup in November 1965, thereby freeing Gizenga. He fled to Congo-Brazzaville, though he soon settled in Moscow to pursue a doctorate in political science.

Over the next couple of years Gizenga traveled to Egypt, Guinea, Mali, and Ghana to solicit support for the fractured and crumbling anti-Mobutu movement. In 1973 he briefly joined Laurent-Désiré Kabila's China-backed rebel group in eastern Zaire (as The Congo was then called), thereby losing Soviet support. He then moved to France, but was deported to Algeria. After briefly living in Angola, he returned to the Republic of the Congo before finally settling in Canada. Mobutu invited him to return to Zaire in 1977 to serve as a figurehead for opposition groups, but Gizenga declined.

== Later political career ==
Mobutu began democratizing Zaire in 1990, allowing Gizenga to return to the country. By 1993, he had consolidated Lumumbist organizations into the Parti Lumumbiste Unifié (PALU). The party had very few members, but Gizenga gained respect for his history of opposing Mobutu. He supported Laurent-Désiré Kabila's seizure of power in 1997, which resulted in the country's name being changed back to Democratic Republic of the Congo. The following year his house was ransacked by police and several PALU demonstrators were shot, and he subsequently opposed Kabila's leadership.

Gizenga ran as the presidential candidate of PALU in the July 2006 election. According to the provisional election results of 20 August, he came in third place with 13.06 percent of the vote, after Joseph Kabila (Laurent-Désiré's son) and Jean-Pierre Bemba. On 30 September 2006, Gizenga signed a coalition agreement with the AMP, Kabila's platform, whereby he would back Kabila in the second round of the presidential election in October 2006, in exchange for the premiership. Kabila won the election and was sworn in as President on 6 December 2006. He subsequently appointed Gizenga as Informant, a position that involves identifying a parliamentary majority so that a government can be formed, and then appointed Gizenga as Prime Minister on 30 December 2006. Gizenga's new government, with 59 members (excluding himself), was appointed and announced on 5 February 2007. A new government under Gizenga was announced on 25 November 2007, with its size reduced to 44 ministers.

Gizenga delegated his duties as Secretary-General of PALU to Remy Mayele on 14 September 2007.

On 25 September 2008, Gizenga submitted his resignation as Prime Minister to Kabila. Later in the day he announced this on television, saying that he decided to resign due to his advanced age. According to Gizenga, he felt unable to continue in office: "For every man, even if you are sane and alert, your body has limits which you have to recognise". He had not received a response from Kabila at that point. Reacting to the news, the opposition Movement for the Liberation of Congo (MLC) said that Gizenga's "resignation constitutes an admission of failure and negligence from a government which, after nearly two years, left the country in a general state of crisis". The MLC disputed Gizenga's statement that his resignation was related to age and health. Kabila reportedly "officially acknowledged" Gizenga's resignation in a letter sent to Gizenga on 28 September. The governing coalition, the Alliance for the Presidential Majority, remained in place after Gizenga's resignation, and negotiations were held regarding the selection of a successor to Gizenga.

His successor, Adolphe Muzito, was appointed by Kabila on 10 October 2008; Muzito is also a member of PALU and was Minister of the Budget in Gizenga's government. Gizenga promptly resumed his duties as Secretary-General of PALU on 13 October 2008, 13 months after delegating them to Remy Mayele.

On 30 June 2009, it was announced that Kabila had designated Gizenga as a National Hero, the DRC's highest honor. His admission to the Order of the National Heroes Kabila-Lumumba made him its only living member and entitled him to a "monthly payment equivalent to the earnings of a prime minister, a residence, a garage with six vehicles, a guard including 12 members of the national police".

Gizenga died at the Centre Médical de Kinshasa on 24 February 2019, aged 93.

== See also ==
- Prime Minister of the Democratic Republic of the Congo
- List of prime ministers of the Democratic Republic of the Congo
- Government of the Democratic Republic of the Congo
- Politics of the Democratic Republic of the Congo
- Antoine Gizenga cabinet

== Citations ==
Political offices
Preceded by Likulia Bolongo	Prime Minister of the Congo-Kinshasa; 2006–2008	Succeeded by Adolphe Muzito
