= Unified Lumumbist Party =

Political party in the Democratic Republic of the Congo

Unified Lumumbist Party Parti Lumumbiste Unifié
- Abbreviation: PALU
- Founded: 22 August 1964
- Split from: Congolese National Movement
- Headquarters: 6, Rue Cannas, Limete, Kinshasa
- Ideology: Lumumbism; Pan-Africanism; African socialism African nationalism Left-wing nationalism
- Political position: Left-wing
- National affiliation: Alliance of the Presidential Majority
- International affiliation: Socialist International (consultative)
- Colours: Red, White
- National Assembly: 17 / 500
- Senate: 2 / 108

Unified Lumumbist Party (French: Parti Lumumbiste Unifié or PALU) is a political party in the Democratic Republic of the Congo. The party's name comes from Patrice Lumumba, the first prime minister of Congo after its independence in 1960 from the Belgian colonial empire.

It was led by Antoine Gizenga who placed third in the 2006 general election. Gizenga backed the incumbent president Joseph Kabila in the runoff election, and was subsequently named prime minister in December 2006. PALU also won 34 out of 500 seats in the new parliament and became the third largest party. In the 2007 senate election, the party won only two out of 108 seats.

Gizenga resigned as prime minister on 25 September 2008 for reasons related to age and health, and on 10 October 2008 Adolphe Muzito, another member of PALU who had served as Budget Minister under Gizenga, was appointed to succeed him. Muzito served as prime minister from 2008 until his resignation on 6 March 2012.

In the 2011 general election, PALU lost 15 seats in the lower house, sinking to 19 seats and becoming the sixth largest party in parliament. Additionally, PALU did not choose to field a presidential candidate in the election.

In 12–13 December 2014, the party was admitted into the Socialist International as an observer affiliate. On 3 October 2018, PALU and its parliamentary allies exited the Presidential Majority coalition in anticipation of the 2018 general elections.

== See also ==
- Mouvement National Congolais
