= 1991 in Zaire =

- Decades: 1970s; 1980s; 1990s
- See also: History of Zaire

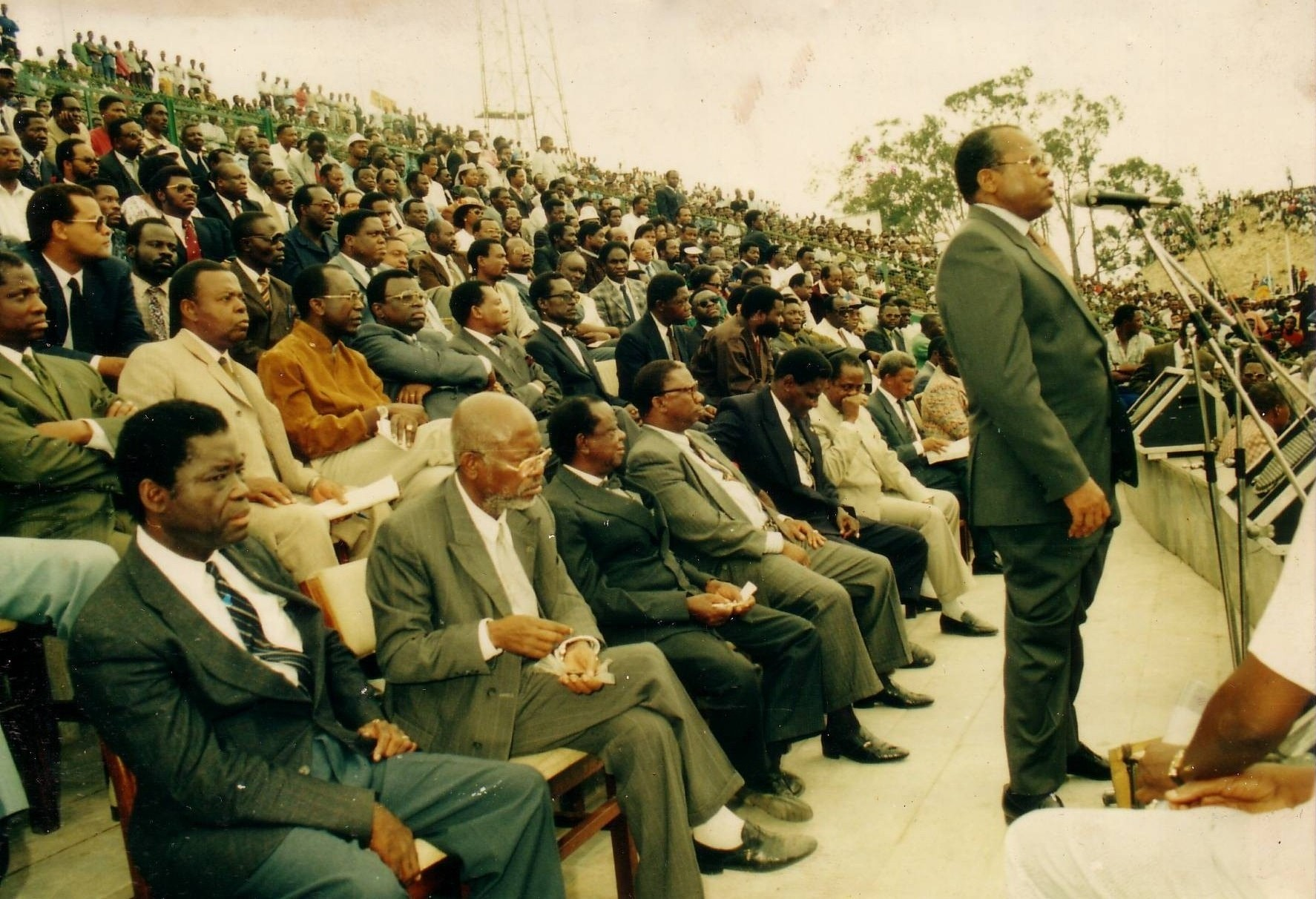
First meeting of the Union Sacrée de l'Opposition Radicale

The following lists events that happened during 1991 in Zaire.

== Incumbents ==
- President: Mobutu Sese Seko
- Prime Minister: Lunda Bululu – Mulumba Lukoji – Étienne Tshisekedi – Bernardin Mungul Diaka – Jean Nguza Karl-i-Bond

== Events ==
| Date | event |
|---|---|
| | Air Africa, based in Kahemba Airport and operated by Moscow Airways, is founded |
| | Trans Service Airlift starts operations from N'djili Airport, Kinshasa. |
| | Association des Guides du Congo (now the Guides de la République Démocratique du Congo) is founded, |
| 1 April | Mulumba Lukoji of the Popular Movement of the Revolution appointed prime minister |
| August | Sovereign National Conference meets to discuss the future of the nation, but collapses within a month. |
| 22 or 23 September | Paratroopers in Kinshasa mutiny and begin to riot, starting the 1991 Zaire unrest. |
| 23 September | The French military launches an intervention (Operation Baumier) to rescue foreigners threatened by the spreading unrest in Zaire. |
| 24 September | The Belgian military launches an intervention (Operation Blue Beam) with similar aims as the French. Order in Kinshasa is restored, although riots continue in the rest of the country. |
| 29 September | Étienne Tshisekedi of the Union for Democracy and Social Progress appointed prime minister |
| 1 November | Bernardin Mungul Diaka of the Democratic Assembly for the Republic appointed prime minister |
| 25 November | Jean Nguza Karl-i-Bond of the Union of Federalists and Independent Republicans appointed prime minister |

== See also ==
- Zaire
- History of the Democratic Republic of the Congo

== Sources ==
- "Human Rights Watch World Report 1993 - Zaire", Refworld
