= 1993 in Zaire =

- Decades: 1970s; 1980s; 1990s
- See also: History of Zaire

The following lists events that happened during 1993 in Zaire.

== Incumbents ==
- President – Mobutu Sese Seko
- Prime Minister – Étienne Tshisekedi – Faustin Birindwa

== Events ==
Date	event
	University of Goma is established in Goma on Lake Kivu.
	Reformed Church of the Faith in Congo is founded, mostly located in Shaba (Katanga)
March - September	Mai-Mai militias of the Hunde, Nyanga, and Nande peoples, apparently supported by local politicians, start to attack the Banyarwanda population, mostly Hutu, in parts of North Kivu. The Hutu form a militia to defend themselves, and for almost six months the ethnic militias fight each other. About 6,000 die and 250,000 are displaced.
18 March	Faustin Birindwa is appointed prime minister.

== See also ==
- Zaire
- History of the Democratic Republic of the Congo

== Sources ==
- Longman, Timothy (July 1996), "Zaire. Forced to Flee. Violence Against the Tutsis in Zaire", HRW reports, 8 (2 (A)), Human Rights Watch
