= 1988 in Zaire =

- Decades: 1970s; 1980s; 1990s
- See also: History of Zaire

The following lists events that happened during 1988 in the Republic of Zaire.

== Incumbents ==
- President: Mobutu Sese Seko
- Prime Minister: Mabi Mulumba – Sambwa Pida Nbagui – Léon Kengo wa Dondo

== Events ==
Date	event
	Kivu Province is broken up into the provinces of Maniema, North Kivu and South Kivu.
7 March	Sambwa Pida Nbagui is appointed prime minister
15 October	The Université Libre de Kinshasa is established, the first private secular university in Zaire.
26 November	Léon Kengo wa Dondo is appointed prime minister

== See also ==
- Zaire
- History of the Democratic Republic of the Congo

== Sources ==
- Accueil, Université Libre de Kinshasa, archived from the original on 2011-09-06
- Bruneau, Jean-Claude (30 June 2009), "Les nouvelles provinces de la République Démocratique du Congo : construction territoriale et ethnicités", L'Espace Politique, 7 (2009–1), doi:10.4000/espacepolitique.1296
