= 1997 in Zaire and the Democratic Republic of the Congo =

- Decades: 1970s; 1980s; 1990s
- See also: History of Zaire

- Decades: 1970s; 1980s; 1990s; 2000s; 2010s
- See also: Other events of 1997; History of the DRC

The following lists events that happened during 1997 in Zaire and the Democratic Republic of the Congo.

== Incumbents ==
- name changed from Zaire to Democratic Republic of the Congo on 17 May 1997
- President -
  1. Mobutu Sese Seko, President of Zaire (1965–1997)
  2. Laurent-Désiré Kabila, President of the Democratic Republic of the Congo (1997–2001)
- Head of Government -
  1. Kengo Wa Dondo, First State Commissioner of Zaire (1994–1997)
  2. Étienne Tshisekedi, First State Commissioner of Zaire (1997)
  3. Likulia Bolongo, First State Commissioner of Zaire (1997)

== Events ==
Date	event
	Sizarail is dissolved and all operations are taken over by the Société nationale des chemins de fer du Congo (SNCC).
18 February	United Nations Security Council Resolution 1097 is adopted unanimously, in which the Council endorsed a five-point peace plan to address the situation in eastern Zaire.
29 March	Société Minière et Industrielle du Kivu (Sominki) is put into liquidation.
16 May	Donatien Mahele Lieko Bokungu, army chief of staff, is killed by Mobutu loyalists.
16 May	First Congo War concludes when forces under Laurent-Désiré Kabila enter Kinshasa
17 May	Zaire is renamed Democratic Republic of the Congo. Bank of Zaire becomes Central Bank of the Congo
16 May	First Congo War concludes when forces under Laurent-Désiré Kabila enter Kinshasa
17 May	Zaire is renamed Democratic Republic of the Congo. Bank of Zaire becomes Central Bank of the Congo
27 May	Decree Law No. 3 defines a structure with a president, government, courts and tribunals.
29 May	Kabila announces schedule for the transition to democracy. Elections are to be held in May 1999.
1 July	Ismail Tutu'emoto and Bunia Luminangulu disappear. They had returned from exile to support the Alliance of Democratic Forces for the Liberation of Congo (AFDL), but had criticized Kabila, which seems to have led to their arrest.
28 October	Professor Kalele Ka Bila and Jean-Francois Kabanda are arrested for calling on citizens to overthrow the "Tutsi invaders". Both were supporters of the Union for Democracy and Social Progress (UDPS).

== See also ==
- First Congo War
- History of the Democratic Republic of the Congo
- Zaire

== Sources ==
- Final Statement of the Canadian National Contact Point - Banro Corporation and a Group of Former Employees, Global Affairs Canada, 25 May 2017
- Little, Allan (24 May 1997), "Hope and retribution in Zaire", BBC News
- N'Lemvo Dedengity, Alain Riche (2008), "Historique de la S.N.C.C.", La problématique de l'audit interne dans la gestion des entreprises publiques en République Démocratique du Congo: Cas de « LA SOCIETE NATIONALE DE CHEMINS DE FER DU CONGO (thesis), Institut supérieur du commerce
- Security Council endorses peace plan for Great Lakes region proposed by UN/OAU Special Representative, United Nations, 18 February 1997
- Democratic Republic of the Congo Country Report on Human Rights Practices for 1997, US State Department, 30 January 1998
