= 1996 in Zaire =

- Decades: 1970s; 1980s; 1990s
- See also: History of Zaire

The following lists events that happened during 1996 in Zaire.

== Incumbents ==
- President: Mobutu Sese Seko
- Prime Minister: Léon Kengo wa Dondo

== Events ==
Date	event
January 8	A Zairean cargo plane crashes into a crowded market in the center of the capital Kinshasa, killing 300.
October 24	Rwanda invades Zaire, starting the First Congo War.

== Births ==
- 5 March - Emmanuel Mudiay, basketball player

== See also ==
- Zaire
- History of the Democratic Republic of the Congo
- First Congo War
