= List of governors of the Banque Centrale du Congo =

This is a list of the governors of the Central Bank of Congo.

Article 17 of Law No. 005/2002 of 7 May 2002, concerning the establishment, organization, and functioning of the Central Bank of Congo, outlines the bank's governing bodies as follows:

- The Bank Council;
- The Governor;
- The Board of Auditors.

Neither the Bank Council nor the Board of Auditors has been operational for some time. In practice, only the Governor's Office is currently functioning, maintaining the former structure which includes the executive management, head office directorates, provincial directorates, and autonomous agencies.

The powers and responsibilities of the governor are defined in Articles 29 and 31 of Law No. 005/2002 of 7 May 2002. The governor directs the bank and represents it in its dealings and relations with third parties, including the government. In this capacity, the governor has the following powers:

- To sign alone the banknotes and securities issued by the bank, the annual reports, balance sheets, and income statements;
- To sign, alone or jointly with others, contracts concluded by the bank, correspondence, and other official documents;
- To sign, in accordance with the bank's personnel regulations, employment, promotion, and dismissal decisions;
- To represent the bank in legal proceedings;
- To delegate powers conferred by law to bank officials.

In performing his duties, the governor is assisted by the vice-governor. The latter exercises functions delegated to him by the governor. In the event of the governor's absence or incapacity, the vice-governor acts as his replacement.

== List of governors ==
Governors	Term of office	Ref
Albert Ndele	1961–1970	
Jules Fontaine Sambwa	1970–1977	
Charles Bofossa Wambea Nkosso	1977–1979	
Jules Croy Emony Mondanga	1979–1980	
Jules Fontaine Sambwa (second term)	1980–1985	
Pierre Pay-Pay wa Syakasighe	1985–1991	
Jean Nyembo Shabani	1991–1993	
Joseph Buhendwa bwa Mushasa	1993–1994	
Godefroid Ndiang Kabul	1994	
Djamboleka Lona Okitongono	1995–1997	
Jean-Claude Masangu Mulongo	1997–14 May 2013	
Deogratias Mutombo Mwana Nyembo	14 May 2013–30 June 2021	
Malangu Kabedi Mbuyi	30 June 2021–23 July 2025	
André Wameso Nkwaluloki	23 July 2025–present	

== See also ==
- Central banks and currencies of Africa
