= 1990 in Zaire =

- Decades: 1970s; 1980s; 1990s
- See also: History of Zaire

The following lists events that happened during 1990 in Zaire.

== Incumbents ==
- President – Mobutu Sese Seko
- Prime Minister – Léon Kengo wa Dondo, then Lunda Bululu

== Events ==
| Date | event |
|---|---|
| | Democratic Social Christian Party is founded by André Bo-Boliko Lokonga and Joseph Iléo. |
| | Kongo University is founded in Mbanza-Ngungu |
| 24 April | President Mobutu announces the end of Zaire's "Second Republic", but makes no immediate move towards restoring democracy. |
| May 1990 | Students at the University of Lubumbashi demonstrate against a speech in which Mobutu backtracks on his promises. |
| August | Union of Federalists and Independent Republicans is founded by Jean Nguza Karl-i-Bond |

== See also ==
- Zaire
- History of the Democratic Republic of the Congo

== Sources ==
- "Human Rights Watch World Report 1993 - Zaire", Refworld
