= 1994 in Zaire =

- Decades: 1970s; 1980s; 1990s
- See also: History of Zaire

The following lists events that happened during 1994 in Zaire.

== Incumbents ==
- President: Mobutu Sese Seko
- Prime Minister: Faustin Birindwa – Léon Kengo wa Dondo

== Events ==
Date	event
	Zaire Airlines, Zaire Express, and Congo Airlines are combined to form Hewa Bora Airways, which starts operations in 1994.
	MIBA Aviation starts operation as an ad hoc and charter cargo operator based in Mbuji-Mayi.
	Sodefor (Société de Développement Forestier) is founded to undertake logging operations in Zaire.
	Orchestre Symphonique Kimbanguiste is founded by conductor Armand Diangienda.
	During the Great Lakes refugee crisis, the Rwandan genocide causes mostly Hutu refugees to flee from Rwanda to North Kivu, where they form Interahamwe militieas with the local Hutus. Thousands of Tutsis leave Zaire for Rwanda and Uganda at the end of the genocide.
February	Higher Institute of Rural Development (ISDR) opens in Kinzau-Mvuete.
6 July	Léon Kengo wa Dondo is appointed prime minister.
22 July	United States President Bill Clinton announces Operation Support Hope, a military effort to provide immediate relief for the refugees of the Rwandan genocide.
14 September	Stade Kamanyola, later renamed Stade des Martyrs, opens in Kinshasa.

== See also ==
- Zaire
- History of the Democratic Republic of the Congo

== Sources ==
- Longman, Timothy (July 1996), "Zaire. Forced to Flee. Violence Against the Tutsis in Zaire", HRW reports, 8 (2 (A)), Human Rights Watch
