= Pierre Pay-Pay wa Syakasighe =

Congolese economist and politician (born 1946)

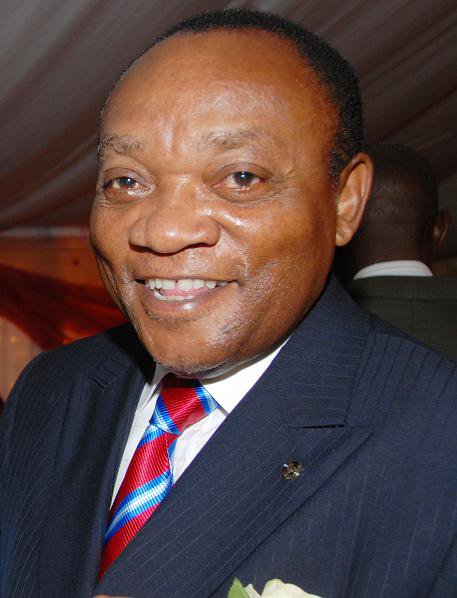

National President of the Union of Christian Democratic Federalists (U.DE.C.F)

Minister of Economy, Industry and Foreign Trade
- In office 18 January 1980 – 5 November 1982
- President: Mobutu Sese Seko
- Prime Minister: André Bo-Boliko Lokonga Jean Nguza Karl-i-Bond N'Singa Udjuu

Minister of Portfolio
- In office 5 November 1982 – 1983
- President: Mobutu Sese Seko
- Prime Minister: Léon Kengo wa Dondo

Minister of Economy and Foreign Trade
- In office 1983–1984
- President: Mobutu Sese Seko
- Prime Minister: Léon Kengo wa Dondo

Governor of the Central Bank of Zaïre
- In office 12 April 1985 – 30 March 1991
- President: Mobutu Sese Seko
- Preceded by: Jules Fontaine Sambwa
- Succeeded by: Jean-Gualbert Nyembo Shabani

Minister of Finance
- In office 6 July 1994 – February 1996
- President: Mobutu Sese Seko
- Prime Minister: Léon Kengo wa Dondo
- Preceded by: Jules Fontaine Sambwa
- Succeeded by: Gilbert Kiakwama kia Kiziki

Member of the National Assembly
- In office 30 July 2006 – 28 November 2011
- Constituency: Butembo (North Kivu)

Personal details
- Born: 10 July 1946 (age 80) Bukavu, South Kivu, Belgian Congo
- Education: Lovanium University

Pierre Pay-Pay wa Syakasighe (born 10 July 1946), is an economist and politician of the Democratic Republic of Congo. During his career, he held several positions relating to the Economy and Finance. He has served as Minister of Economy, Industry and Foreign Trade, Minister of Portfolio, Minister of Finance, CEO of Commercial Gécamines, and Governor of the Central Bank of Congo at the time of Zaire. Pierre Pay-Pay was a candidate in the 2006 Presidential Election for the Congolese Democratic Convention (CODECO), an electoral platform that brought together several political parties. He served in the National Assembly as a member following the 2006 Legislative Elections. He is currently National President of the Union of Christian Democratic Federalists (U.DE.C.F).

Pierre Pay-Pay wa Syakassighe was born on 10 July 1946 in Bukavu, South Kivu, Belgian Congo. He obtained a master's degree in economics at Lovanium University in 1969, and in 1975 he became vice-president of the National Association of Pharmaceutical Sector Companies of Zaire (Aneza). Mobutu Sese Seko appointed him as minister of economy, industry, and trade in 1980. Pay-Pay also served as governor of the Central Bank of Zaire from 1985 to 1991, and as minister of finance from 1994 to 1996. When Mobutu was overthrown by Laurent-Désiré Kabila in 1997, he went into exile in Belgium, while maintaining links to the Mai-Mai groups that fought during the Second Congo War. He later became a member of the Transitional Government's parliament.

Pay-Pay is also a member of the political bureau for "Ensemble pour le changement", the opposition political coalition formed by former governor of Katanga Moïse Katumbi to support his presidential bid in the upcoming 2018 presidential election.

== See also ==
- List of governors of the Banque Centrale du Congo
