= 1948 Sabena Douglas DC-4 crash =

Plane crash in the Belgian Congo

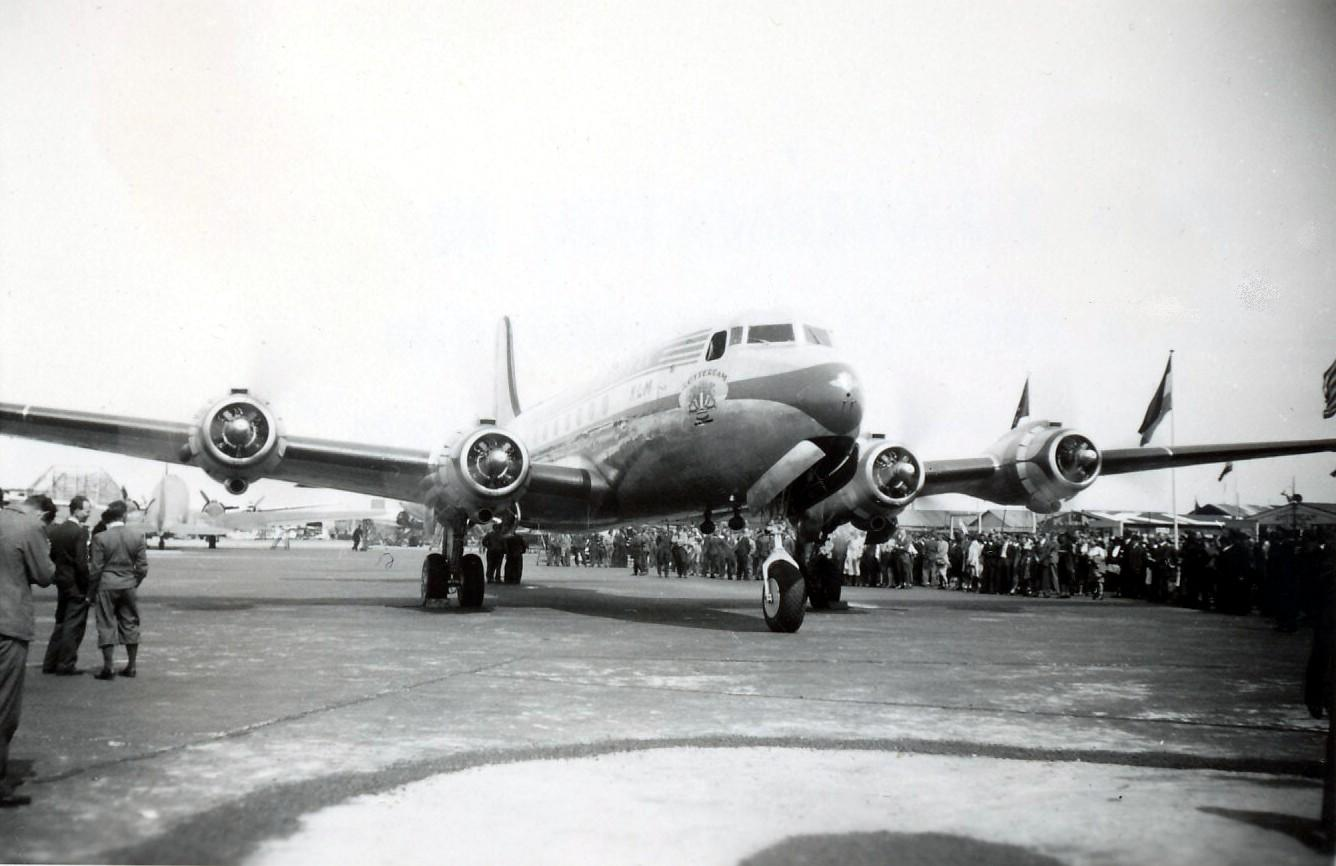
- A KLM DC-4, similar to the accident aircraft

Accident
- Date: 12 May 1948
- Summary: Weather, flew into a tornado, loss of control
- Site: 27 km (17 mi) south of Libenge

Aircraft
- Aircraft type: Douglas DC-4-1009
- Operator: Sabena
- Registration: OO-CBE
- Flight origin: Palmietfontein Airport, South Africa
- 1st stopover: Léopoldville-N'Djili Airport (FIH/FZAA), Belgian Congo
- Last stopover: Libenge Airport (LIE/FZFA), Belgian Congo
- Destination: Haren Airport, Belgium
- Occupants: 32
- Passengers: 25
- Crew: 7
- Fatalities: 31
- Injuries: 1
- Survivors: 1

The 1948 Sabena Douglas DC-4 crash occurred on 12 May 1948 when a Sabena Douglas DC-4 crashed 27 km south of Libenge, Belgian Congo. It was the deadliest accident for Sabena at the time and the second of three deadly Sabena crashes in 1948. It was also the deadliest in Belgian Congo before the country's independence as the Democratic Republic of the Congo in 1960. Of the 32 people on board, 31 were killed, leaving only one survivor.

== Aircraft ==
The DC-4-1009 involved was built in 1946 and bought new from Douglas with serial number 42932 and registration OO-CBE and was used by the Belgian airline company Sabena from 17 April 1946 until its destruction in 1948. The aircraft was mostly used in Belgian Congo and carried Regent Prince Charles of Belgium back to Belgium on 13 August 1947 after his official visit to Congo.

== Crash ==
The Sabena flight departed from Léopoldville-N'Djili Airport en route to Libenge Airport with 25 passengers and seven crew members on board. Mid-flight, the aircraft mysteriously began to lose control, subsequently plummeting into the rainforest at high speeds.

== Probable cause ==
While above the Congo rainforest, 27 km south of Libenge, at an altitude of 700 feet (210 m), the aircraft probably penetrated a very turbulent line of clouds or flew the aircraft into the active centre of a tornado at a low altitude. The aircraft was probably then forced to the ground by a downward gust.

The aircraft hit the tree-tops and left a 200 m (660 ft) trail through the forest until it finally crashed, killing all seven crew members and 24 of the 25 passengers. The sole survivor was an Egyptian man.

== Aftermath ==
The wreck was located the following day and the injured sole survivor was rescued. Rescuers searched for more survivors, but it quickly became clear that their efforts were in vain. This crash was the second deadly crash of three involving a Sabena aircraft in 1948.
