= 1995 in Zaire =

- Decades: 1970s; 1980s; 1990s
- See also: History of Zaire

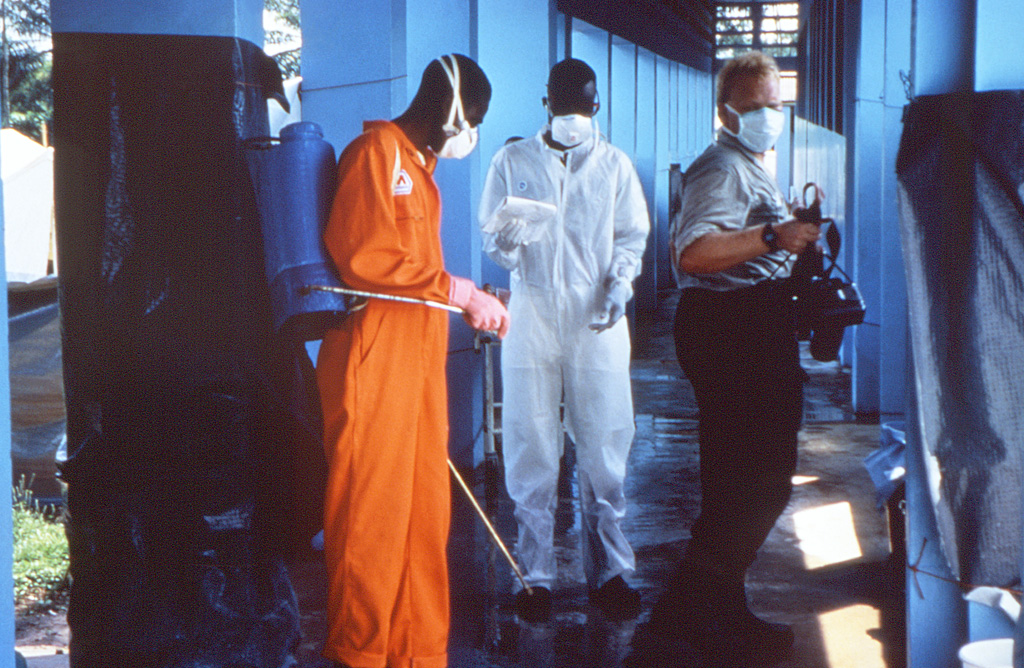
Sanitary procedures being practiced in a clinic in Zaire during the 1995 Ebola outbreak

The following lists events that happened during 1995 in Zaire.

== Incumbents ==
- President: Mobutu Sese Seko
- Prime Minister: Léon Kengo wa Dondo

== Events ==
Date	event
	FC Les Anges (later called FC MK Etanchéité, FC Max Mokey), a football club, is founded in Kinshasa.
	Munzihirwa Centre is founded by the Society of Jesus in Kinshasa.
	Late in the year there is a sharp rise in violence in North Kivu, with Zairian soldiers and various rival militia groups involved. The well armed and organized Hutu militias generally have the upper hand. Thousands of Tutsi are forced to flee to Rwanda.
November	Société Nationale des Chemins de Fer Zaïrois is dissolved and operation of the Zaire railways is ceded to the newly formed Sizarail.

== See also ==
- Zaire
- History of the Democratic Republic of the Congo

== Sources ==
- Bobb, F. Scott (2010), "Railways", Historical Dictionary of the Democratic Republic of the Congo (PDF) (3 ed.), Scarecrow Press, ISBN 978-0-8108-6325-5
- Kubusch, Lars; Schöggl, Hans (2021), Congo-Kinshasa (DR Congo, Zaire) - Foundation Dates of Clubs, Rec.Sport.Soccer Statistics Foundation
- Longman, Timothy (July 1996), "Zaire. Forced to Flee. Violence Against the Tutsis in Zaire", HRW reports, 8 (2 (A)), Human Rights Watch
