= 1989 in Zaire =

- Decades: 1970s; 1980s; 1990s
- See also: History of Zaire

The following lists events that happened during 1989 in the Republic of Zaire.

== Incumbents ==
- President: Mobutu Sese Seko
- Prime Minister: Léon Kengo wa Dondo

== Events ==
Date	event
15 February - 22 March 1989	Students protest against price and quality of public transport. Five University campuses are closed in Kinshasa.
November	Catholic University of Bukavu is established in Bukavu.

== Births ==
- 22 June - Christian Eyenga, basketball player

== See also ==
- Zaire
- History of the Democratic Republic of the Congo

== Sources ==
- Student Demonstrations in October 1988 and February 1989 in Zaire, Canada: Immigration and Refugee Board of Canada, 1 September 1989
- Université catholique de Bukavu, AUF, archived from the original on 2024-12-04
