= Air Africa =

African airline operated by Moscow Airways

| IATA | ICAO | Call sign |
|---|---|---|
| M8 | MSC | AIR AFRICA |
- Founded: 1991
- Ceased operations: 1996
- Operating bases: Kahemba Airport
- Fleet size: 10
- Destinations: 2
- Parent company: Aeroflot
- Headquarters: Moscow, Russia

Air Africa was an airline based in Kahemba Airport, Zaire. The airline started flights in 1991 with a few destinations in the country, operated by Moscow Airways, but closed in 1996 after the 1996 Air Africa crash.

== Fleet ==
| Aircraft | Start | End | In fleet | Notes |
|---|---|---|---|---|
| Ilyushin Il-62M | 1993 | 1996 | 3 | — |
| Antonov An-32B | 1993 | 1996 | 5 | — |
| Beriev Be-32Ps | 1993 | 1996 | 2 | — |

== Destinations ==
- N'Dolo Airport
- Kahemba Airport

== Accident ==
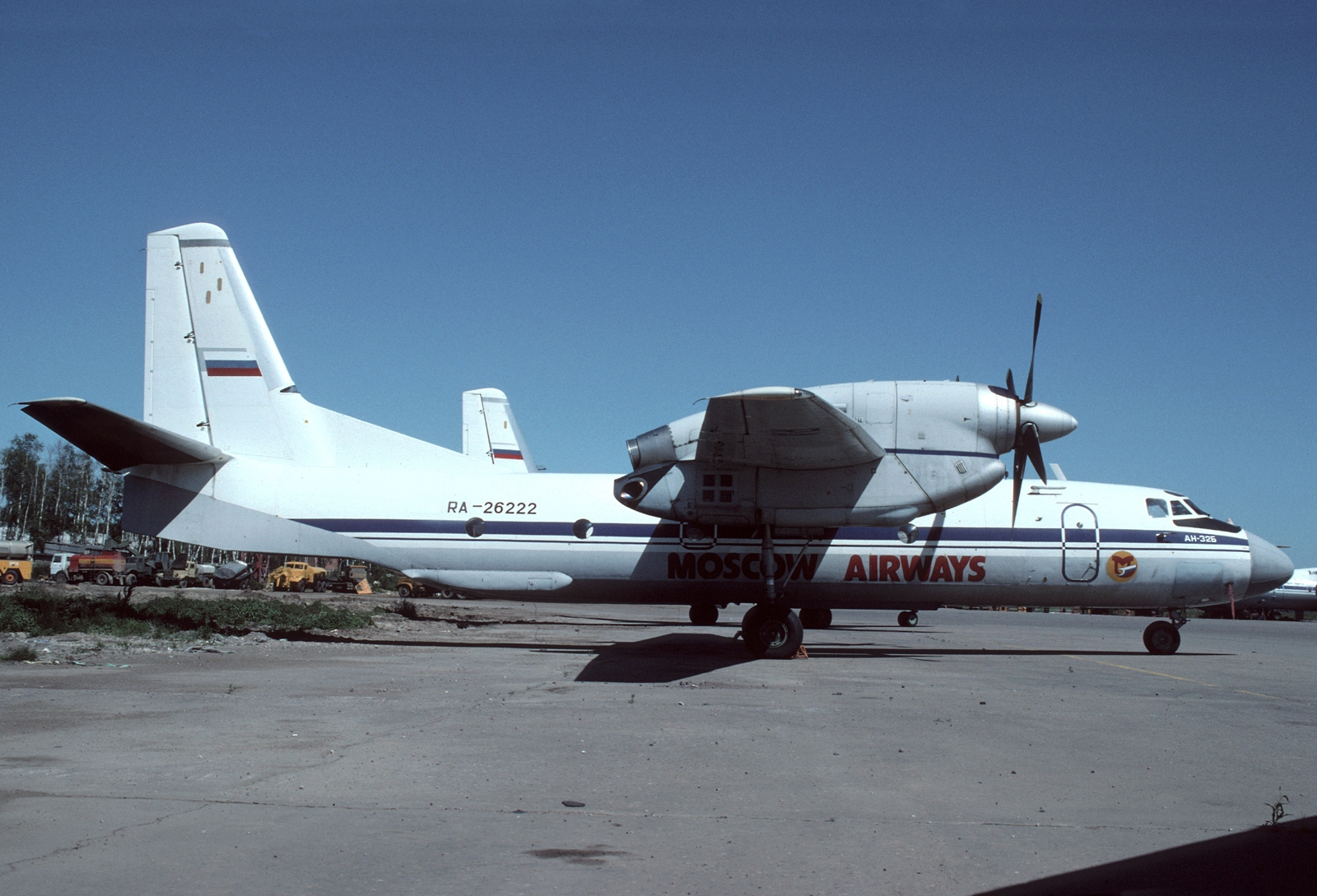
The same aircraft involved in the accident

On 8 January 1996, an Air Africa Antonov An-32 aircraft (RA-26222) which had been wet-leased by Moscow Airways to Scibe Airlift crashed into a market shortly after taking off from N'Dolo Airport in Kinshasa, capital of the Democratic Republic of the Congo, killing approximately 300 people (see 1996 Air Africa crash). At the time, the Russian Ministry of Transport had "suspended or withdrawn" Moscow Airways' air operator's license.
