= 1992 in Zaire =

- Decades: 1970s; 1980s; 1990s
- See also: History of Zaire

The following lists events that happened during 1992 in Zaire.

== Incumbents ==
- President: Mobutu Sese Seko
- Prime Minister: Jean Nguza Karl-i-Bond, then Étienne Tshisekedi

== Events ==
Date	event
31 August	Following a National Conference to discuss the nation's future, a new government assumed office under Prime Minister Étienne Tshisekedi. This was the first time in 27 years that Mobutu had not designated the government members.

== Births ==
- 28 August - Bismack Biyombo, basketball player

== See also ==
- Zaire
- History of the Democratic Republic of the Congo

== Sources ==
- "Human Rights Watch World Report 1993 - Zaire", Refworld
