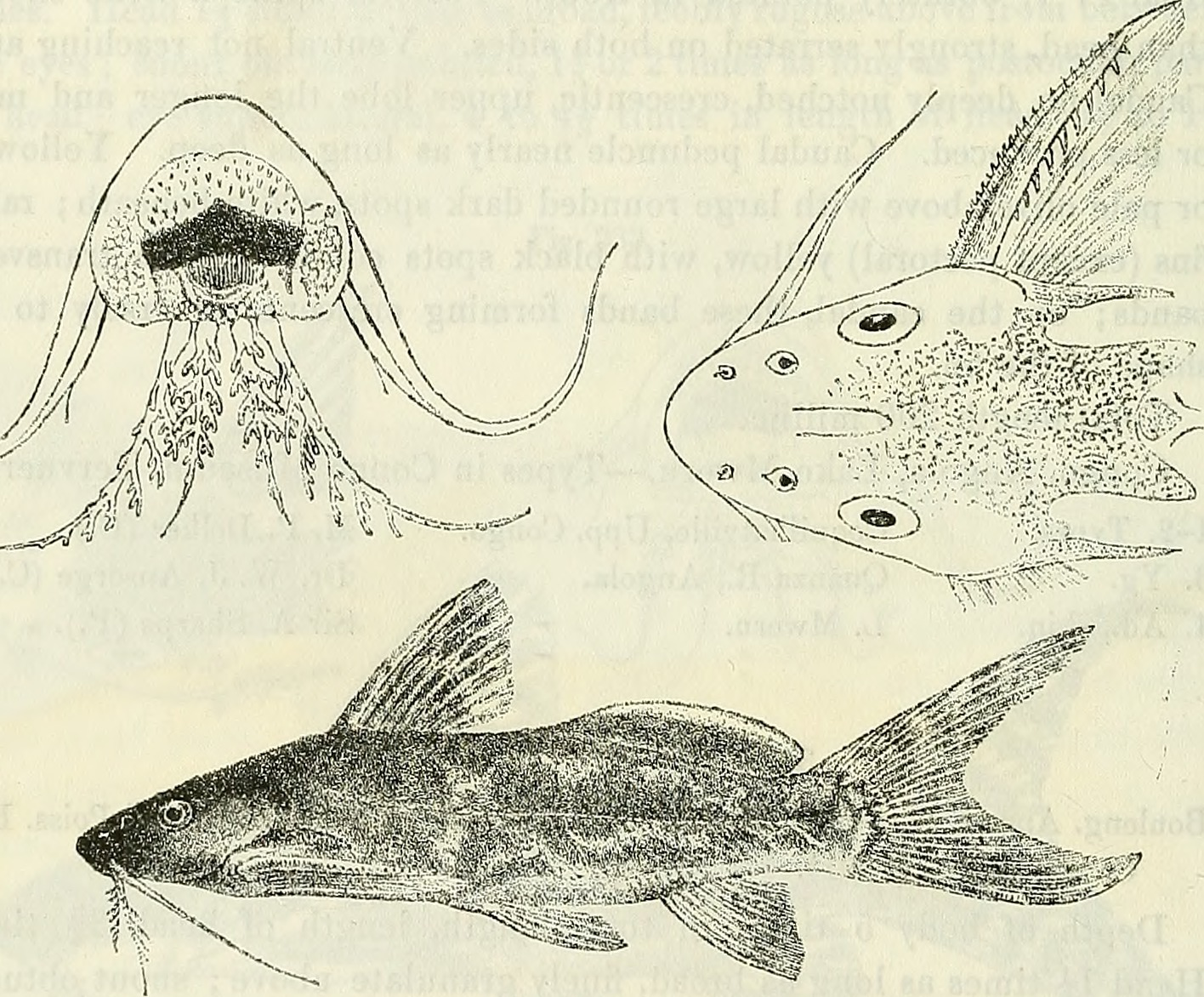

Conservation status
- Least Concern (IUCN 3.1)

Scientific classification
- Kingdom: Animalia
- Phylum: Chordata
- Class: Actinopterygii
- Order: Siluriformes
- Family: Mochokidae
- Genus: Synodontis
- Species: S. soloni

Binomial name
- Synodontis soloni Boulenger, 1899

= Synodontis soloni =

Species of fish

Synodontis soloni, known as the scissortail synodontis, is a species of upside-down catfish that is endemic to the Democratic Republic of the Congo where it is found in the Ubangi River and the rapids just below Stanley Pool. It was first described by British-Belgian zoologist George Albert Boulenger in 1899, from the Congo River in what is now the Democratic Republic of the Congo. The species name soloni is a patronym and in memory of Alexandre Solon, who assisted with the collection of fish.

== Description ==
Like all members of the genus Synodontis, S. soloni has a strong, bony head capsule that extends back as far as the first spine of the dorsal fin. The head contains a distinct narrow, bony, external protrusion called a humeral process. The shape and size of the humeral process helps to identify the species. In S. soloni, the humeral process is rough, much longer than it is broad, and pointed at the end.

The fish has three pairs of barbels. The maxillary barbels are on located on the upper jaw, and two pairs of mandibular barbels are on the lower jaw. The maxillary barbel is long and straight without any branches, with a broad membrane at the base. It extends a little longer than the head. The outer pair of mandibular barbels is a little under twice the length of the inner pair. They have short branches.

The front edges of the dorsal fins and the pectoral fins of Syntontis species are hardened into stiff spines. In S. soloni, the spine of the dorsal fin is a little shorter than the length of the head, smooth in the front and serrated on the back. The remaining portion of the dorsal fin is made up of seven branching rays. The spine of the pectoral fin is a little shorter than the head and serrated on both sides. The adipose fin is 4 1/2 times as long as it is deep. The anal fin contains three unbranched and seven branched rays, and is obtusely pointed in the front. The tail, or caudal fin, is deeply forked.

All members of Syndontis have a structure called a premaxillary toothpad, which is located on the very front of the upper jaw of the mouth. This structure contains several rows of short, chisel-shaped teeth. In S. soloni, the toothpad forms three or four separated series of teeth. On the lower jaw, or mandible, the teeth of Syndontis are attached to flexible, stalk-like structures and described as "s-shaped" or "hooked". The number of teeth on the mandible is used to differentiate between species; in S. soloni, there are about 18 to 20 teeth on the mandible.

The base body color is olive-grey on the back, marbled with brown, and white on the underside. The dorsal and caudal fins have round brown spots.

The maximum total length of the species is 15.5 centimetres (6.1 in). Generally, females in the genus Synodontis tend to be slightly larger than males of the same age.

== Habitat and behavior ==
In the wild, the species is known in the Pool Malebo rapids and from Libenge. It is also found in the lower Congo River basin and the Ubangi River. The species is harvested for human consumption. The primary threats to the species arise from pollution in its habitat and from dam construction. The reproductive habits of most of the species of Synodontis are not known, beyond some instances of obtaining egg counts from gravid females. Spawning likely occurs during the flooding season between July and October, and pairs swim in unison during spawning. The growth rate is rapid in the first year, then slows down as the fish age.
