= Mbuyi =

Mbuyi is a Congolese surname. Notable people with the surname include:

- Andréa Mbuyi-Mutombo (born 1990), Congolese footballer
- Gabriel N'Galula (born 1982), Belgian footballer
- Joseph Mbuyi (1929–1960 or 1961), Congolese politician
- Malangu Kabedi Mbuyi (born 1958), Congolese economist
- Mukendi Mbuyi (born 1960), Congolese basketball player
- Steven Mbuyi Komphela (born 1967), South African soccer player and coach
- Victor-David Mbuyi Bipungu, Congolese-Canadian Anglican bishop
