= 1987 in Zaire =

- Decades: 1970s; 1980s; 1990s
- See also: History of Zaire

The following lists events that happened during 1987 in the Republic of Zaire.

== Incumbents ==
- President: Mobutu Sese Seko
- Prime Minister: Mabi Mulumba

== Events ==
Date	event
	Zaire suffered from a measles epidemic in 1986 that continued into 1987.
22 January	Mabi Mulumba is appointed prime minister
6 September	In the 1987 Zairean parliamentary election the Popular Movement of the Revolution was the only party.

== See also ==
- Zaire
- History of the Democratic Republic of the Congo

== Sources ==
- Fischer, P R (May 1988), "Measles in Zaire: 1987", Clin Pediatr (Phila), 27 (5): 234–5, doi:10.1177/000992288802700503, PMID 3365904
