= 1996 Air Africa Antonov An-32 crash =

1996 aviation accident in Zaire

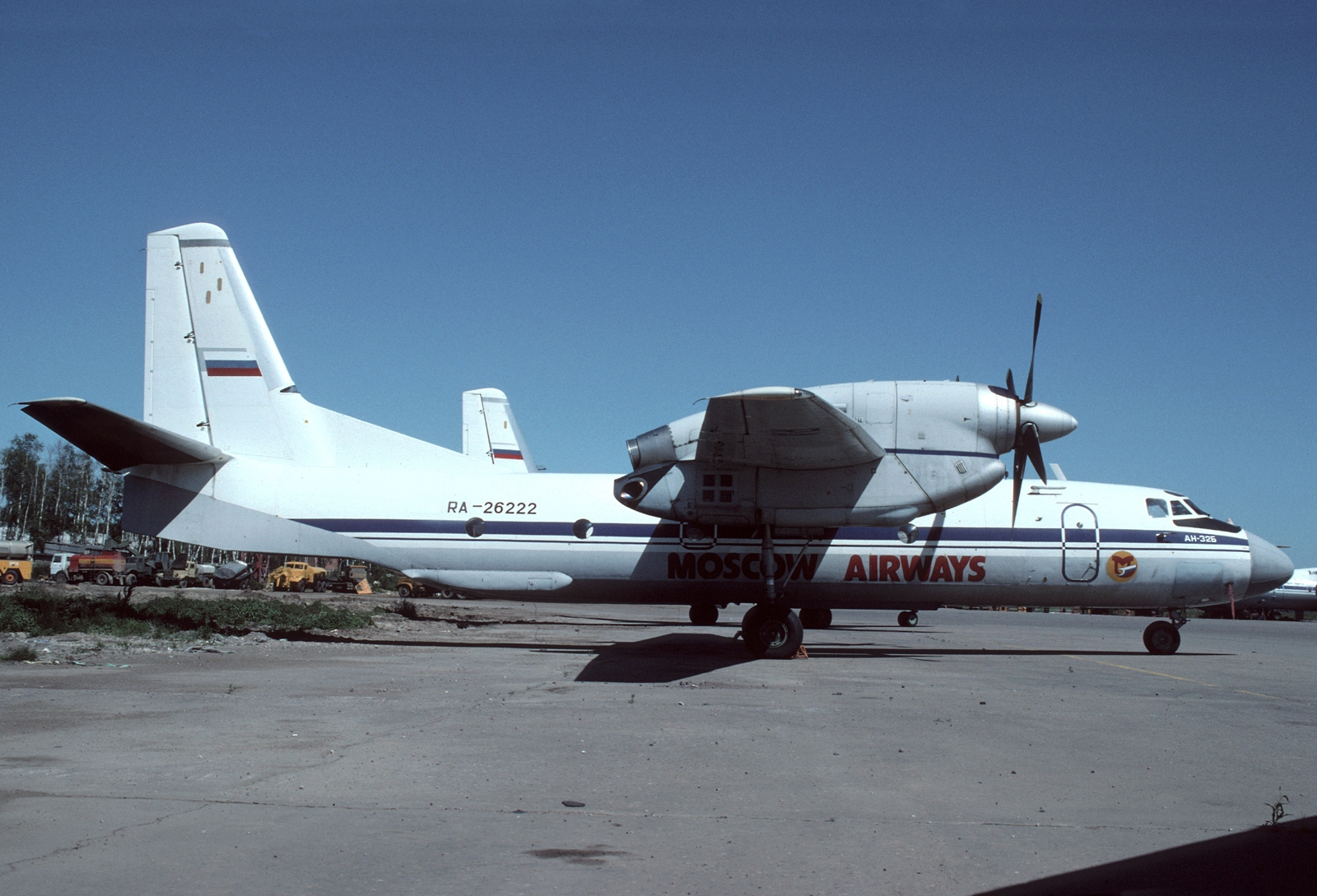
- RA-26222, the aircraft involved in the accident, pictured in 1994

Accident
- Date: 8 January 1996
- Summary: Runway overrun after failed takeoff
- Site: N'Dolo Airport, Kinshasa, Zaire; 4.3295°S 15.318°E
- Total fatalities: 227-350
- Total injuries: 504+

Aircraft
- Aircraft type: Antonov An-32B
- Operator: Moscow Airways on behalf of Air Africa
- Registration: RA-26222
- Flight origin: N'Dolo Airport
- Destination: Kahemba Airport
- Occupants: 6
- Passengers: 0
- Crew: 6
- Fatalities: 2
- Injuries: 4
- Survivors: 4

Ground casualties
- Ground fatalities: 225-348
- Ground injuries: 500+

On 8 January 1996, a Moscow Airways Antonov An-32B operating on behalf of Air Africa overran the runway at N'Dolo Airport after attempting to take off overloaded. The aircraft was flying from Kinshasa to Kahemba, Zaire. The aircraft ploughed into Kinshasa's Simbazikita street market. Four of the six crew of the aircraft survived the accident. On the ground, however, it is estimated that there were between 225 and 348 fatalities, with more than 500 people injured. It was the deadliest aviation accident in African history until the 2018 Algerian Air Force Ilyushin Il-76 crash, the deadliest to occur in the Democratic Republic of the Congo, and the deadliest accident in terms of ground fatalities, superseded only by the intentional crashes of American Airlines Flight 11 and United Airlines Flight 175 in the September 11 attacks in 2001.

== Background ==
After decades of conflicts in sub-Saharan Africa, the air transport business is complex and often illegal. The aircraft was operated on behalf of Air Africa, chartered from Scibe Airlift, who in turn contracted Moscow Airways.

Around this time, Scibe Airlift, a company owned by Bemba Saolona with ties to President Mobutu Sese Seko, was found to be transporting arms to UNITA.

== Accident ==
While attempting to take off fully fuelled and overloaded from N'Dolo Airport's short runway, the An-32B did not achieve sufficient speed to bring its nose up, yet began to lift. It crashed into the open-air Simbazikita produce market, full of shacks, pedestrians and cars, and its full fuel load ignited. The number of casualties cited varies from 225 (per the manslaughter charges) to 348.

== Aftermath ==
The first injured went to the Mama Yemo Hospital (now Kinshasa General Hospital), which was quickly overwhelmed. Two other hospitals took the additional victims. A worker with the International Committee of the Red Cross, Vincent Nicod, stated that 217 bodies were found at the market, in addition to 32 more bodies possibly already at morgues within the city.

President Mobutu and Saolona both attended the funeral on 10 January 1996 at the Protestant Centenary Cathedral (French: Cathédrale du Centenaire).

The Russian pilots, Nicolai Kazarin and Andrei Gouskov, were charged and convicted of manslaughter, each receiving the maximum two-year sentence. At trial, they admitted they were using borrowed clearance papers from Scibe Airlift, that they knew the flight was illegal, and that the flight was actually bound for Angola. Scibe Airlift and African Air paid fines of US$1.4 million to the families and the injured.
