= Minister of Finance (Democratic Republic of the Congo) =

The Ministry of Finance of the Democratic Republic of the Congo oversees the implementation of national financial policy. Doudou Roussel Fwamba Likunde Li-Botayi has been the head of the ministry since 2025.

== Ministers of Finance ==
=== Republic of Congo ===
- Pascal Nkayi, June 1960 - September 1960
- Albert Ndele, September 1960 - February 1961
- Arthur Pinzi, August 1961 - July 1962
- Emmanuel Bamba, July 1962 - July 1964
- Dominique Ndinga, July 1964 - October 1965
- Jean-Joseph Litho, October 1965 - October 1967
- Paul Mushiete, October 1967 - March 1968
- Thomas Luango, March 1968 - August 1968
- Victor Nendaka, August 1968 - August 1969
- Namwisi ma Nkoy, August 1969 - September 1970
- Albert Ndele, September 1970 - November 1970

=== Zaire ===
- Baruti Wa Ndwali, February 1972 - January 1975
- Charles Bofossa, January 1975 - August 1977
- Jules Croy Emony Mondanga, December 1977 - March 1979
- Ngole Miki, March 1983 - January 1983
- Tshishimbi Wa Bilenga, February 1985 - July 1985
- Patrice Djamboleka, July 1985 - October 1986
- Mabi Mulumba, October 1986 - January 1987
- Jean Nyembo Shabani, January 1987 - July 1987
- Kinzonzi Mwatukidi Ngindu, July 1987 - March 1988
- Cléophas Kamitatu, March 1988 - October 1988
- Katanga Mukumadi, October 1988 - May 1990
- Bombito Botamba, May 1990 - March 1991
- Munga Munkamba, March 1991- October 1991
- Faustin Birindwa, October 1991
- Ramazani Mwene, October 1991 - November 1991
- Mwamba Mulunda, November 1991 - August 1992
- Benoît Atale, August 1992 - December 1992
- Mbonga Magalu, December 1992 - March 1993
- Jules Fontaine Sambwa, March 1993 - April 1993
- Célestin Tshibwabwa, April 1993
- Jules Fontaine Sambwa, April 1993 - July 1994
- Pierre Pay-Pay wa Syakasighe, July 1994 - February 1996
- Gilbert Kiakwama kia Kiziki, February 1996 - December 1996
- Marco Banguli, December 1996 - April 1997
- Mashagiro Maba, April 1997 - May 1997
- Kasereka Kasay, May 1997

=== Democratic Republic of the Congo ===
- Mawampanga Mwana Nanga, May 1997 - January 1998
- Fernand Tala-Ngai, January 1998 - March 1999
- Mawampanga Mwana Nanga, March 1999 - November 2000
- Jean Amisi Mutumbi, November 2000 - April 2001
- Freddy Matungulu, April 2001 - February 2003
- Léonard Luongwe, February 2003 - June 2003
- Modeste Mutombo Kyamakosa, June 2003 - January 2005
- André-Philippe Futa, January 2005 - November 2005
- Marco Banguli, November 2005 - February 2007
- Athanase Matenda Kyelu, February 2007 - February 2010
- Matata Ponyo Mapon, February 2010 - April 2012
- Patrice Kitebi Kibol Mvul, April 2012 - December 2014
- Henri Yav Mulang, December 2014 - August 2019
- José Sele Yalaghuli, August 2019 - April 2021
- Nicolas Kazadi, April 2021 - June 2024
- Doudou Fwamba, June 2024 - Incumbent

== See also ==
- Economy of the Democratic Republic of the Congo
