= Mavua Mudima =

Congolese naval officer

Grand Admiral Mavua Mudima was a former Congolese naval officer who served as the commander of the Navy of Republic of Zaire and later as Defense Minister. He was appointed to this post in the government of Prime Minister Leon Kengo (1994–1997), although some sources suggest he could have been appointed as early as 1992.

Before that he served as the director of the National Intelligence Agency in 1993, although since he was not from the same tribe as Mobutu Sese Seko the real power was in the hands of his deputy. He was removed from the position in 1993 From around 1994 to 1997, Mudima was the Defense Minister of Zaire, and held that office around the time of the First Congo War. During his tenure he wanted the refugees from the Rwandan genocide to return to Rwanda.

Around December 1996 or January 1997 Mudima was removed from his post as Minister of Defense and replaced by General Likulia Bolongo. Following the war Mudima, Nzimbi Etienne, and Baramoto Kpama (who were both former military Generals) fled to South Africa in May 1997 and were later accused of plotting a coup against the new President of DR Congo, Laurent Kabila. South Africa refused to grant them asylum in February 1998, and they then traveled to Ivory Coast and Mali, which also rejected them, before obtaining asylum in Niger.

In 1999, after the start of the Second Congo War, he and his two colleagues that had fled had been accused of mobilizing a large number of former Congolese army troops in rebellion against President Kabila for the Rally for Congolese Democracy (RCD), a Rwandan-backed rebel group. However, the group formally refused to allow Mudima and his colleagues to join them.
