= Pascal Nkayi =

Politician

Minister of Finance of the Republic of the Congo
- In office 24 June 1960 – 9 September 1960
- President: Joseph Kasa-Vubu
- Prime Minister: Patrice Lumumba

Personal details
- Born: 18 September 1911 (age 114) Palabala, Belgian Congo
- Party: Alliance des Bakongo

Pascal Nkayi (18 September 1911 – ?) was a Congolese politician. He served as Minister of Finance of Republic of the Congo from June until September 1960.

== Biography ==
Pascal Nkayi was born on 18 September 1911 in Palabala, Belgian Congo. He attended four years of normal school. In 1934 he became a teacher. He later took up work as a clerk in the postal service. In May 1954 he became assistant treasurer of the Association du Personnel Indigene de la Colonie labour union.

In 1960 the Congo became independent and Nkayi was elected in the Bas-Congo district on an Alliance des Bakongo ticket to the Chamber of Deputies with 107 preferential votes, the smallest margin of victory among any successful candidates. He served as Minister of Finance in Patrice Lumumba's government, which was officially invested by Parliament on 24 June 1960. On 27 July Nkayi held a press conference to share his concerns about the national decline in social and economic activity following independence. Alluding to Lumumba, he denounced "demagogic statements that harm the interests of the Congolese people". In August the government sent him to Geneva to negotiate with Belgian authorities over financial and monetary concerns. In early September he established a monetary council and began issuing new paper currency. On 9 September Lumumba announced that he had dismissed Nkayi from his cabinet.
