= Mulumba Lukoji =

Crispin Mulumba Lukoji

Prime Minister of Zaire
- In office 1 April 1991 – 29 September 1991
- President: Mobutu Sese Seko
- Preceded by: Lunda Bululu
- Succeeded by: Étienne Tshisekedi

Personal details
- Born: 5 March 1943; Kipushi, Belgian Congo (Now Congo-Kinshasa)
- Died: 3 March 1997 (aged 53); Johannesburg, South Africa
- Political party: Popular Movement of the Revolution

Crispin Mulumba Lukoji (5 March 1943 – 3 March 1997), was a Congolese politician. An academic by profession, he became Prime Minister of Zaire on 1 April 1991 after Lunda Bululu resigned. He was relatively unknown prior to his selection, but was praised for his economic acumen. His appointment was seen as a move to cause opposition leaders Étienne Tshisekedi and Jean Nguza Karl-i-Bond to lose support. Lukoji oversaw the National Conference in August 1991 that led to democratization. He was criticized for being too close to President Mobutu Sese Seko and rapidly lost support by opposition forces. Lukoji was forced to resign on 29 September 1991 amid civil unrest. He died in Johannesburg on 3 March 1997.
