= Freddy Matungulu =

Congolese economist

- Born: Mbuyamu Ilankir "Freddy" Matungulu; January 4, 1955 (age 71); Belgian Congo (DRC)
- Occupation: Economist
- Known for: Minister of Finance of the Democratic Republic of the Congo

Mbuyamu Ilankir "Freddy" Matungulu (born January 4, 1955 Belgian Congo (DRC) is a Congolese economist. He was Minister of Finance of Democratic Republic of the Congo from 2001 to 2003.

== Biography ==
=== Education ===
Freddy Matungulu Mbuyamu Ilankir was born on January 4, 1955, in Lubembo, Bandundu Province, in the Democratic Republic of the Congo, the son of a Congolese civil servant. He studied Economics at the University of Kinshasa (UNIKIN), with a concentration in International and Monetary Economics. After receiving a Bachelor's degree with distinction in 1977, he was appointed Assistant Professor in the Economics Department at UNIKIN and simultaneously became a credit analyst at the Congolese Bank for Foreign Trade (Banque du Peuple) in Kinshasa.

In 1980, he was awarded a US Government scholarship to pursue his graduate studies in the United States. The same year he completed a diploma course in English and Economics at the University of Colorado Boulder and, the following year, another diploma course (English language) at the State University of New York at Buffalo.

In 1983, he obtained a Master's in International Economics from The Fletcher School, Tufts University, near Boston, Massachusetts, followed in 1986 by a PhD. His doctoral thesis was entitled: “Exchange Rate Policy, Resource Allocation and Growth Patterns in the Zairian Economy, 1967-1983” (“La politique des taux de change et son impact sur les mécanismes d’allocation des resources et la croissance dans l’économie zaïroise: 1967-1983”).

=== Academic career ===
In 1986, Matungulu returned to Kinshasa and was appointed Associate professor at the Department of Economics of UNIKIN, where he taught courses in political economy (Departments of Economics and Law) and monetary policy (Department of Economics). He also taught, for a year, Currency and Credit at the Higher Institute of Commerce in Kinshasa.

Seeking government experience, from 1986 to 1992 Matungulu was appointed to several advisory positions in various ministries:

- Special Advisor to the Vice Governor of the Central Bank of Congo
- Economic Advisor to the Ministry of Budget and Planning
- Senior Advisor to the Ministry of Transportation and Communications
- Senior Advisor to the Ministry of Foreign Trade
- Coordinator of the Advisory Branch to the Ministry of Budget
- Senior Advisor and coordinator of the council of economic and technical advisors to the Prime Minister
- Senior Advisor to the Ministry of Budget

=== Economist at the International Monetary Fund (IMF) ===
In July 1992, he joined the International Monetary Fund (IMF) in Washington, United States as an economist and in 1998 was appointed as the Resident Representative of the IMF in Cameroon, where he supervised the implementation of a program of economic reform initiated in 1996.

In 1994, he created the annual Prize Professor Matungulu to reward the best first-degree economics student from UNIKIN.

=== Ministerial service ===
In April 2001, he was appointed Minister of Economy, Finance and Budget of the Democratic Republic of the Congo (DRC). In February 2003, Freddy Matungulu resigned as Minister of Finance, lacking broad-based government support for his efforts to root out corruption.

=== Back to the IMF ===
In July 2003, he returned to the International Monetary Fund, where he performed the functions of Country Team Leader / Head of Mission for the design and monitoring of economic programs of various countries with financial and technical assistance agreements with the IMF.

As Head of Mission, Freddy Matungulu conducted, from 2003 to 2014, about thirty IMF visits to various IMF member countries.

=== Politics ===
In December 2014, Freddy Matungulu took an early retirement from the IMF, to regain his freedom of speech. He aims to contribute to the efforts to improve the economic and social situation of his home country, the Democratic Republic of Congo. During the same month, he published an article in the magazine Jeune Afrique entitled “ DRC : a society sick of its politicians and its elite ” to denounce the evils that plague the RDC.

In May 2015, Freddy Matungulu created a political party: "Congo Na Biso" ("Our Congo", CNB in acronym). The party headquarters is located in Kinshasa.

On August 8, 2018, Freddy Matungulu registered with the Independent National Electoral Commission (CENI) as a candidate for the December 2018 presidential election in the Democratic Republic of the Congo. As part of the efforts to establish a single opposition candidacy, Freddy Matungulu took part in the Conclave of the Opposition which led to the creation in Geneva (Switzerland), on November 11, 2018, of the opposition LAMUKA COALITION of which he is a co-founder. The work of the Conclave benefited from the facilitation/technical support of the Kofi Annan Foundation. The other participants, co-founders of the LAMUKA Coalition, are Jean-Pierre Bemba, Martin Fayulu, Vital Kamerhe, Katumbi Chapwe, Adolphe Muzito and Félix Tshisekedi.

On August 1, 2019, Freddy Matungulu was elected to the board of directors of the African Development Bank (AfDB) in Abidjan, Cote d'Ivoire. Over the next three years, he was the Board member representing the six countries of the Central Africa Group, namely: Burundi, Cameroon, Congo-Brazzaville, the Central African Republic, the Democratic Republic of the Congo (DRC), and Chad. Matungulu's term at the AfDB's Board ended on July 31, 2022.

From November 1, 2022, to January 15, 2026, Mr. Matungulu was an Alternate Executive Director at the International Monetary Fund (https://www.imf.org/en/Home) in Washington, DC, USA. His office represented 17 Central and Eastern African countries on the IMF Board of Directors. These countries include the DRC, Republic of Congo, Cameroon, Sudan, South Sudan, Uganda and Kenya.

== Sources & Relevant External Links ==
- (in French) Congolese Finance Department
- (in French) Central Bank of Congo
- (in French) Ministère des Finances : photos des ministres et vice-ministres des Finances
