= Likulia Bolongo =

Congolese politician and general (1939–2026)

Prime Minister of Zaire
- In office 9 April 1997 – 16 May 1997
- President: Mobutu Sese Seko
- Preceded by: Étienne Tshisekedi
- Succeeded by: Vacant (Note: Antoine Gizenga as Prime Minister of the Democratic Republic of the Congo in 2006)

Vice Prime Minister and Minister of Defense
- In office 24 December 1996 – 9 April 1997
- Preceded by: Mavua Mudima
- Succeeded by: Donatien Mahele Lieko Bokungu

Personal details
- Born: Norbert Likulia Bolongo Lingbangi; 8 July 1939 Basoko, Orientale Province, Belgian Congo
- Died: 26 June 2026 (aged 86) Brussels, Belgium
- Spouse: Marie-Godelive Nyota Ngongo
- Children: 5
- Education: Aix-Marseille University

Military service
- Allegiance: Zaire
- Rank: General

Norbert Likulia Bolongo Lingbangi (8 July 1939 – 26 June 2026) was a Congolese politician and military official who served as Prime Minister of Zaire from 9 April 1997 to 16 May 1997, before his deposition after the First Congo War. Bolongo was the last prime minister appointed by Mobutu Sese Seko.

== Early life and education ==
Norbert Likulia Bolongo Lingbangi was born in Basoko on 8 July 1939. He is a member of the Lokele people. He graduated with a doctorate from Aix-Marseille University. He taught law at the National University of Zaire.

== Career ==
From 1971 to 1985, Bolongo was auditor general of the armed forces. Seven journalists from the United Kingdom, West Germany, France, and Spain were arrested in 1977 for entering the Shaba Province with papers from Angola; Bolongo accused them of espionage, but claimed that Mobutu Sese Seko chose to repatriate them to their respective ambassadors.

Prime Minister Léon Kengo wa Dondo's cabinet was reorganised on 24 December 1996, and resulted in Bolongo being appointed as Minister of Defence and Vice Prime Minister. A state of emergency was declared in Zaire by Mobutu Sese Seko on 8 April 1997, and Mobutu appointed Bolongo to replace Étienne Tshisekedi as Prime Minister of Zaire on 9 April. Bolongo was the last person to serve as prime minister under Mobutu.

A plan by Bolongo and Chief of Staff Kpama Baramoto Kata to recruit 500 mercenaries from South Africa and launch a counter-offensive against the rebels; the plan was approved by Mobutu. As rebels approached the capital in May 1997, Bolongo and military leaders told Mobutu that they could not hold the city and that he should leave. Bolongo informed United States Ambassador Daniel H. Simpson that Mobutu was fleeing Zaire for Brazzaville; Bolongo later fled to Brazzaville as well.

Bolongo returned to the Democratic Republic of Congo in 2000. President Laurent-Désiré Kabila appointed Bolongo as the Minister of Enterprises in his cabinet on 1 September 2000. Bolongo ran for the presidency in the 2006 election, but received less than 0.50% of the vote in the first round. He supported Jean-Pierre Bemba in the second round.

== Personal life and death ==
Bolongo married Marie-Godelive Nyota Ngongo, with whom he had five children, in Kisangani on 7 July 1961. He spoke French. He resided in Paris in the 2010s. He died in Brussels, Belgium on 25 June 2026, at the age of 86.

== Works cited ==
=== Journals ===
- "Four Months In Review". Current History. 96 (611). Daniel Mark Redmond: 293–303. 1997. doi:10.2307/45317722. JSTOR 45317722.

=== News ===
- "General to release Western journalists". Jacksonville Daily News. 6 May 1977. p. 16A – via Newspapers.com.
- "Paid fighters – and their paymasters". Africa Confidential. 20 June 1997. Archived from the original on 30 June 2026.
- "President Kabila reshuffles cabinet". The New Humanitarian. 5 September 2000. Archived from the original on 30 June 2026.
- "Zairian ruler shuffles government". The Olympian. 25 December 1996. p. A11 – via Newspapers.com.
- French, Howard (16 May 1997). "Zairian Rebels Nearing Capital as Mobutu's Forces Flee". The New York Times. Archived from the original on 17 February 2018.
- Kibangula, Trésor (30 May 2017). "RDC : mobutistes un jour, mais pas toujours". Jeune Afrique. Archived from the original on 30 June 2026.
- Ligodi, Patient (17 May 2022). "17 mai 1997-17 mai 2022: la RDC se souvient, 25 ans après Mobutu". Radio France Internationale. Archived from the original on 19 May 2022.
- Serrill, Michael (29 May 2006). "Finally, The End". Time. Archived from the original on 23 May 2025.
- Sindani, Serge (26 June 2026). "Décès du Général d'armées Norbert Likulia Bolongo, dernier chef du gouvernement sous le maréchal Mobutu". BETO. Archived from the original on 30 June 2026.

=== Web ===
- "Likulia Bolongo - Zaire" (PDF). Central Intelligence Agency. 15 November 1988. Archived (PDF) from the original on 30 May 2024.
