= Moscow Airways =

Russian airline

| IATA | ICAO | Call sign |
|---|---|---|
| M8 | MSC | Air Moscow |
- Founded: 1991
- Ceased operations: 1996
- Operating bases: Sheremetyevo International Airport
- Parent company: Aeroflot
- Headquarters: Moscow, Russia

Moscow Airways was a Russian airline that was formed as a subsidiary of Aeroflot to operate the airline's fleet of Ilyushin Il-62s.

== History ==
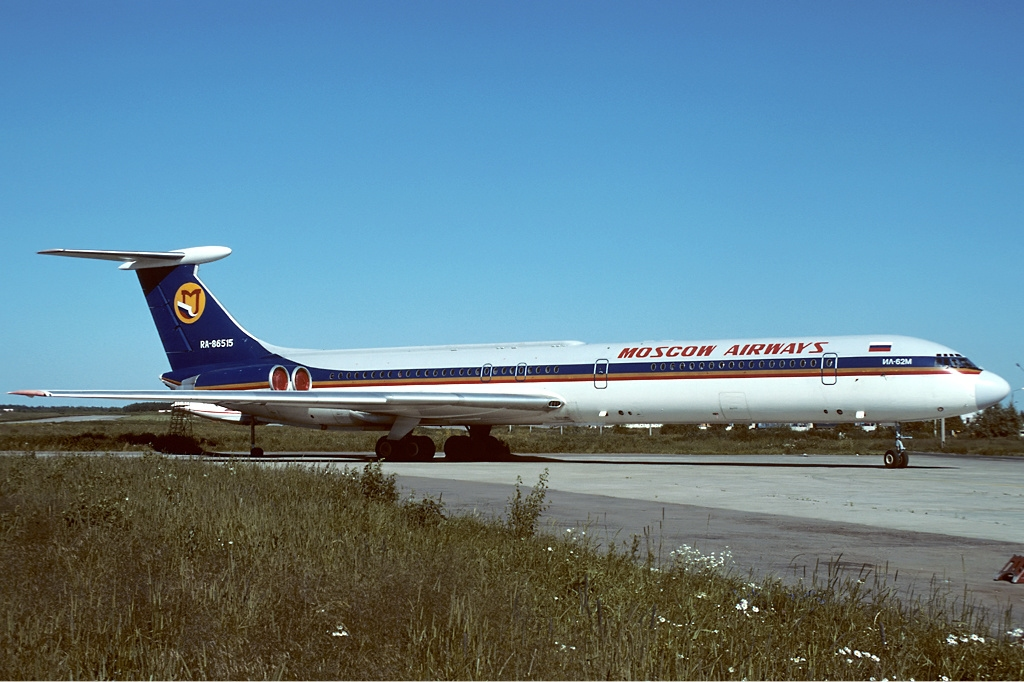
A Moscow Airways Ilyushin Il-62M at Sheremetyevo International Airport, Moscow, Russia. (1994)

It began operating in 1991, flying passengers and airfreight. Among the airline's destinations by 1993 were Sharjah (United Arab Emirates) and Jeddah (Saudi Arabia), from where Moscow Airways ferried home South African Muslims returning from pilgrimage.

Moscow Airways operated, from 1993 to 1996, an Ilyushin Il-76TD (tail number RA-76498) that was built in 1982, and also flew a Tupolev Tu-154M (RA-85681) that carried passengers on charter flights from Sheremetyevo International Airport; both aircraft previously belonged to Aeroflot. In 1993, the airline ordered fifty Beriev Be-32Ps. These were never built nor delivered.

The airline stopped operations in 1996 after the fatal accident in Africa which killed approximately 300 people.

== Accidents and incidents ==
- On 8 January 1996, an Air Africa Antonov An-32 aircraft (RA-26222) which had been wet-leased from Moscow Airways to Scibe Airlift crashed into a market shortly after taking off from N'Dolo Airport in Kinshasa, capital of the Democratic Republic of the Congo, killing approximately 300 people. At the time, the Russian Ministry of Transport had "suspended or withdrawn" Moscow Airways' air operator's license.
