= Beriev Be-30 =

Soviet regional airliner

Be-30
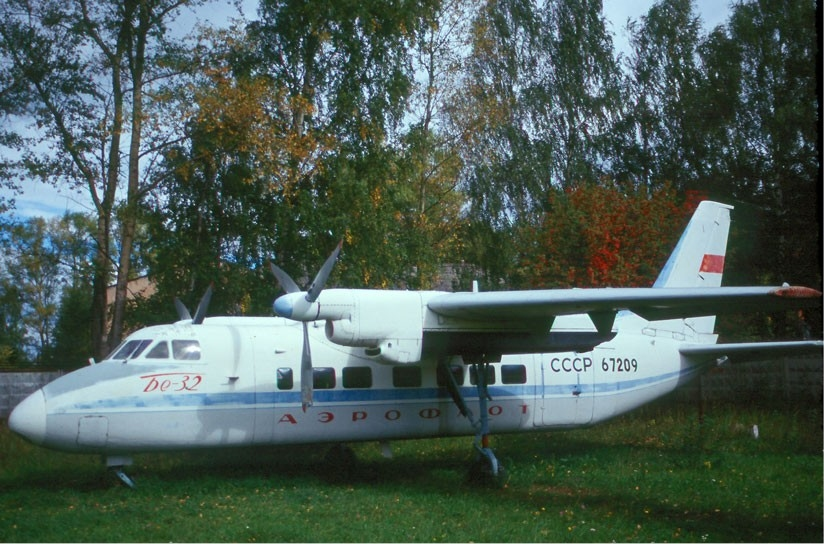
- Aeroflot Beriev Be-32

General information
- Type: Airliner
- Manufacturer: Beriev
- Primary user: Aeroflot
- Number built: 8

History
- Manufactured: 1968–1976
- First flight: 3 March 1967

The Beriev Be-30 (NATO reporting name "Cuff") is a Russian regional airliner and utility transport aircraft designed by the Beriev Design Bureau. It was developed specifically for Aeroflot local service routes using short, grass airstrips. It was also designed to be used in the light transport, aerial survey and air ambulance roles. It competed against the Antonov An-28 and the Czechoslovak Let L-410 Turbolet.

== Design and development ==
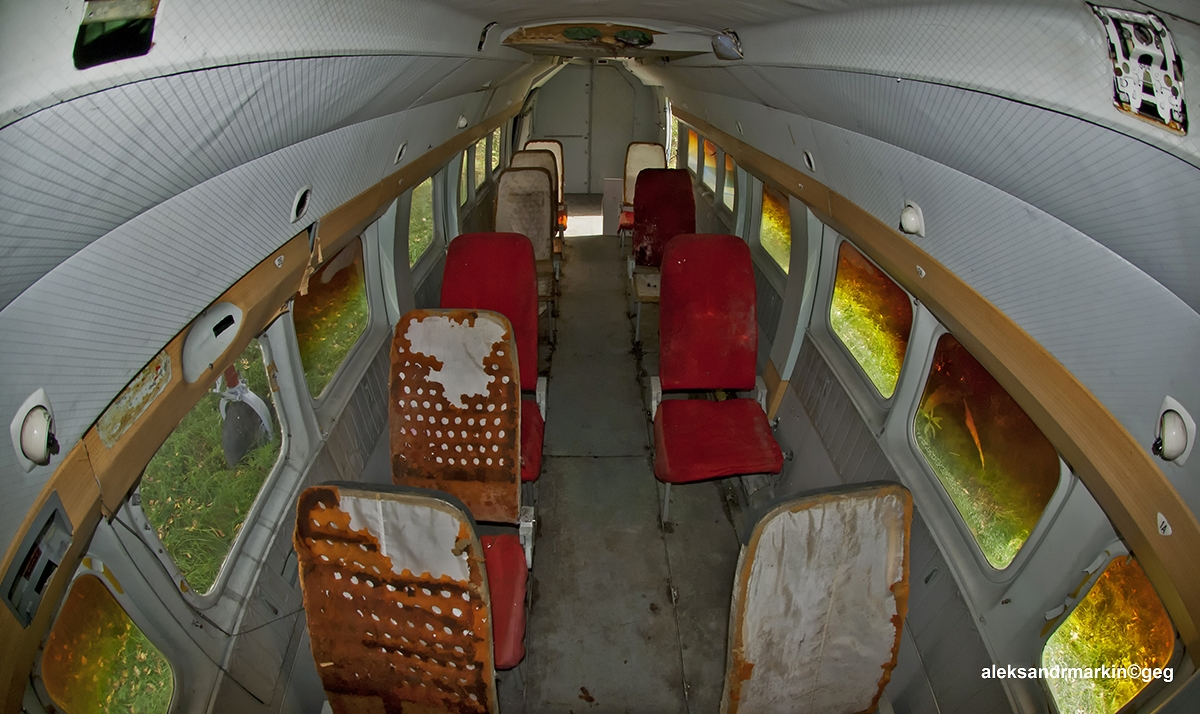
Be-32 cabin

The original design featured interconnected engines, so that in case of one engine failing, the remaining engine could drive both propellers. This feature was not implemented in the production version.

The first prototype flew on 3 March 1967, fitted with Shvetsov ASh-21 piston engines, while the first production prototype flew on 18 July 1968, using more powerful Glushenkov TVD-10 turboprop engines. The first deliveries to Aeroflot were in mid-1969.

The Be-30 was designed for a flight crew of two with passenger arrangements for 14 (in the Be-30) to a maximum of 17 (in the Be-32) seated two abreast. Corporate shuttle configuration seated seven. The air ambulance configuration could accommodate nine stretcher patients, six seated patients and one medical attendant.

Three Be-30s and five Be-32s were built in the late 1960s before the program was terminated. In the early 1990s one of the original Be-32s was converted to a Be-32K demonstrator and presented at the 1993 Paris and Dubai air shows. It was painted in the colors of the now defunct Moscow Airways which had ordered 50 aircraft but ceased operations before any could be built or delivered.

== Variants ==
- Be-30 Prototype first flew on 3 March 1967, powered by two 550 kW (740 hp) Shvetsov ASh-21 radial piston engines, driving three-blade constant speed propellers. Fuel capacity 1,000 kg (2,200 lb).
- Be-30: Production model
- Be-30A: With 'high-density' seating for 21-23 passengers
- Be-32: Upgraded model first displayed in 1993. Two 754 kW (1,011 shp) Glushenkov TVD-10B turboprops driving three-blade constant speed propellers.
- Be-32K: 'Westernized' version with two 820 kW (1,100 shp) Pratt & Whitney Canada PT6A-65B turboprops driving three-blade Hartzell reversible pitch propellers. Fuel capacity 2,250 L (590 US gal).

== Operators ==
Operators of the Beriev Be-30 (in order by country)

Democratic Republic of the Congo

- Air Africa

Russia

- Moscow Airways

Soviet Union

- Aeroflot

== Specifications (Be-30) ==
Data from

General characteristics

- Crew: 2
- Capacity: 14-16 passengers / 1,500 kg (3,307 lb) payload
- Length: 15.7 m (51 ft 6 in)
- Wingspan: 17 m (55 ft 9 in)
- Height: 5.52 m (18 ft 1 in)
- Wing area: 32 m^{2} (340 sq ft)
- Airfoil: root: P-20 (18%); tip: P-20 (14%)
- Empty weight: 3,607 kg (7,952 lb)
- Max takeoff weight: 5,860 kg (12,919 lb)
- Fuel capacity: 1,000 kg (2,200 lb)
- Powerplant: 2 × Glushenkov TVD-10 turboprop engines, 708 kW (949 hp) each
- Propellers: 3-bladed constant-speed propellers

Performance

- Maximum speed: 480 km/h (300 mph, 260 kn) at 2,000 m (6,600 ft)
- Cruise speed: 460 km/h (290 mph, 250 kn) at 2,000 m (6,600 ft)
- Range: 1,300 km (810 mi, 700 nmi)
