= Mabi Mulumba =

Congolese politician (born 1941)

First State Commissioner of Zaire
- In office 22 January 1987 – 7 March 1988
- President: Mobuto Sese Seko
- Preceded by: Kengo Wa Dondo
- Succeeded by: Sambwa Pida Nbagui

Personal details
- Born: Évariste Mabi Mulumba; 22 April 1941 (age 85) Mikalay, Kasai-Occidental, Belgian Congo
- Spouse: Jeanne Ndaya Yamba
- Education: University of Liège

Évariste Mabi Mulumba (born 22 April 1941) is a Congolese former politician. He was Minister of Finance of Zaire from October 1986 to January 1987. He served as the First State Commissioner of Zaire from 22 January 1987 to 7 March 1988.
