= Jeannot Bemba Saolona =

Congolese businessman (1942–2009)

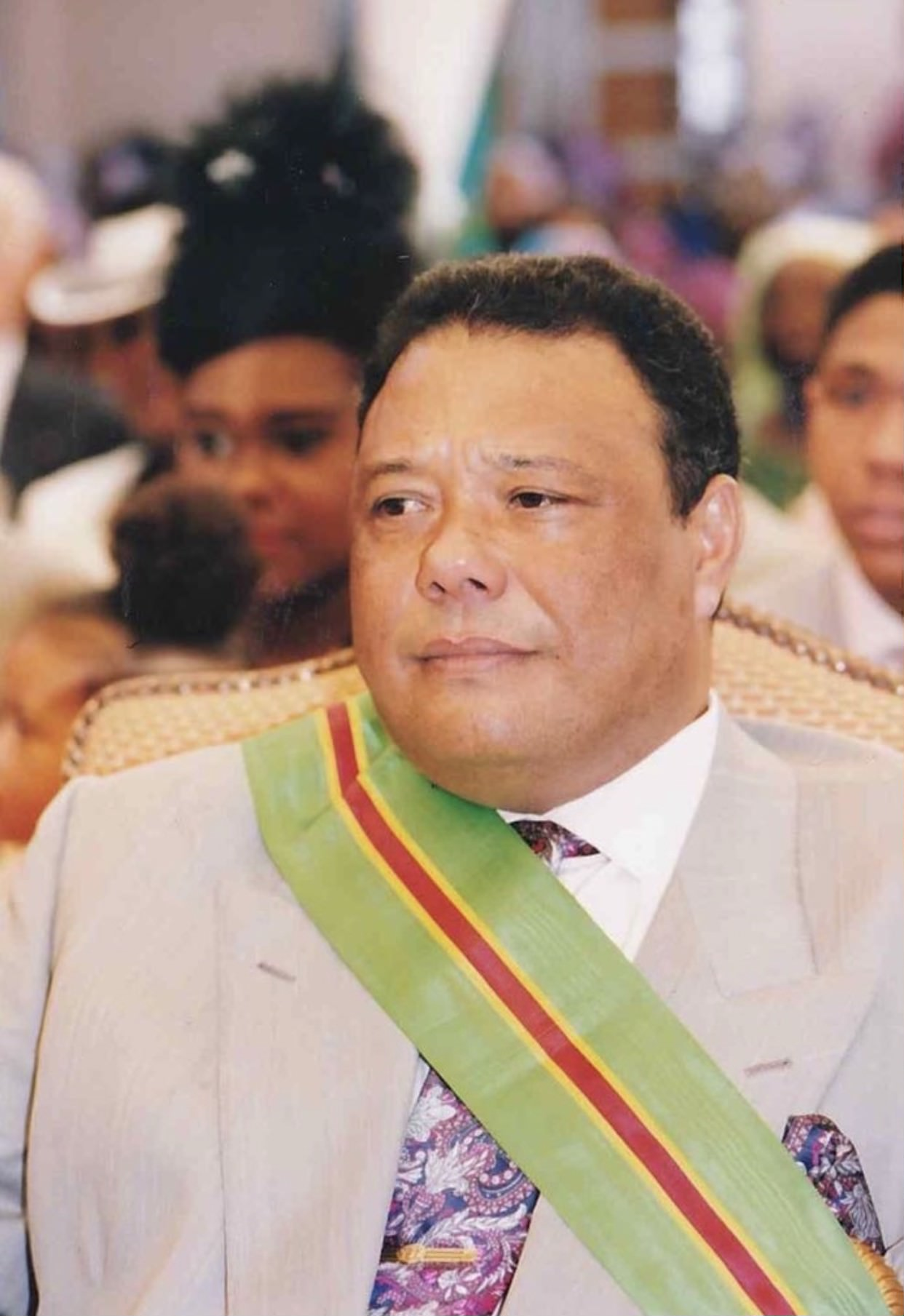
- Bemba in 1995, at his daughter's wedding

Minister of Economy and Industry
- In office 14 March 1999 – 22 June 2000

Personal details
- Born: Jeannot Bemba Saolona; 3 September 1942 Libenge, Équateur, Belgian Congo
- Died: 1 July 2009 (aged 66) Brussels, Belgium
- Relations: Nzanga Mobutu (son-in-law)
- Children: Catherine Bemba Mobutu; Jean-Pierre Bemba
- Occupation: Businessman, Politician

Jeannot Bemba Saolona (3 September 1942 – 1 July 2009) was a Congolese businessman, Minister of the Economy and Industry, and Senator for Équateur. He was regarded as the most renowned businessman of the Zaire era and was a close confidant of Mobutu Sese Seko. He's the father of Jean-Pierre Bemba and the father-in-law of Nzanga Mobutu.

== Background ==
Jeannot Bemba Saolona is the son of a Belgian father and a Congolese mother. He did not pursue advanced studies and began his career as a trader. Bemba becomes, with the help of Mobutu Sese Seko, one of the richest men in Zaire and controls a huge conglomerate, SCIBE, which invests in mining resources and import-export. Bemba's daughter, Catherine Bemba, is married to one of Mobutu's sons, Nzanga Mobutu.

He was for a long time President of the National Association of Businesses of Zaire (ANEZA), currently the Federation of Businesses of the Congo (FEC), which constitutes both the chamber of commerce and industry and the main employers' organization in the country. Bemba was then one of the pillars of the Mobutu regime.

In 1979, he created Scibe Airlift, a private airline which is part of the Scibe conglomerate. It is the country's first private airline. During the 1980s, Bemba tried to make the company successful but with the fall of Mobutu Sese Seko in 1997, it was a failure and Scibe Airlift went bankrupt in 2002. Bemba Saolona's company, Scibe CMMJ, was implicated by the United Nations in smuggling weapons to UNITA during the Angolan Civil War. He was a close confidant to President Mobutu Sese Seko.

After the overthrow of Mobutu Sese Seko, Bemba was imprisoned by Laurent-Désiré Kabila. On March 14, 1999, Bemba is appointed as Minister of Economy and Industry, regaining his central role in the Congolese economic fabric. Bemba also has to deal with his son Jean-Pierre who is the head of the Movement for the Liberation of Congo (MLC), a rebel group opposed to Kabila. In 2003, the country began a political transition to end the civil war: Jean-Pierre Bemba was appointed vice-president and Jeannot Bemba became a member of the transitional parliament. In 2006, he's elected senator of Sud-Ubangi.

On July 1, 2009, Bemba died of thrombosis in Brussels, Belgium at the age of 66.
