= Munga Mibindo =

Munga "Max" Mibindo served as the President Delegate General of SNEL, La Société Nationale d'Electricité, in the Republic of Zaire in the early and mid 1980s. Prior to that appointment, he had been the Director of Zaire's largest public bus company.

An engineer by profession, he was educated in Belgium at Leuven University and was considered an integral part of Prime Minister Kengo Wa Dondo's entourage during the Mobutu years. A personable and erudite technocrat, he oversaw construction of the Inga-Shaba Transmission Line, often mediating brilliantly during disputes among sub-contractors.
