= Libenge Airport =

- IATA: LIE; ICAO: FZFA

Summary
- Airport type: Public
- Serves: Libenge
- Elevation AMSL: 1,125 ft / 343 m
- Coordinates: 3°37′45″N 18°38′15″E

Map
- Location of the airport in Democratic Republic of the Congo

Runways
Direction	Length		Surface
Direction	m	ft	Surface
15/33	1,580	5,184	Dirt
- Sources: Google Maps GCM

Libenge Airport (IATA: LIE, ICAO: FZFA) is an airport serving the Ubangi River town of Libenge in the Sud-Ubangi Province of the Democratic Republic of the Congo. The Ubangi is locally the border with the Central African Republic.

The runway has an additional 500 metres (1,600 ft) cleared ground overrun on the southern end.

The Libenge non-directional beacon (Ident: LIB) is located on the airfield.

== See also ==
- Transport in the Democratic Republic of the Congo
- List of airports in the Democratic Republic of the Congo
