= Munzihirwa Centre, Kinshasa =

- Abbreviation: CMM
- Established: 1995; 31 years ago
- Headquarters: Matonge III, Kalamu; DRC Congo
- Founder: Nzuzi Bibaki
- Director: Kapitula Nzanzu
- Affiliations: Jesuit, Catholic
- Website: Munzihirwa

Munzihirwa Centre, Kinshasa, Democratic Republic of Congo, takes in street children, shelters and educates them, and then places them with suitable families. It was founded by the Society of Jesus in 1995 and named after the Jesuit Bishop Christophe Munzihirwa Mwene Ngabo who was murdered for sheltering refugees from the Rwandan genocide.

== History ==
Since its founding by the Central African Province of the Society of Jesus and Nzuzi Bibaki in August 1995, the Munzihirwa Center (CMM) has rescued about 100 street children each year. They are given temporary shelter and classes suitable to their level of education, from primary through various trade school options (including carpentry, fitting and welding, and artistic). The center has been recognized as a non-profit association by ministerial decree.

In 2014, the center was the subject of a research study by the Vatican's Pontifical Council for the Pastoral Care of Migrants and Itinerant People. It has provided a case study of child welfare in Africa, and in 2012 it was the subject of a graphic report by the French comic-book novelist Frank Meynet, alias Hippolyte.

== Programs ==
CMM has as its objective to settle children with their biological or extended families, or with a host family. It has on its team ten social educators. It also supports the tuition of 50 children in different schools in the city and apprenticeships in the trades for 25 young people, while maintaining regular contact with families, schools, and learning centres. The children remain enrolled in education or job training programs after being integrated into a family. CMM continues to offer a home to a number of children who cannot be placed in a family.

== See also ==
- List of Jesuit sites
