= Bernardin Mungul Diaka =

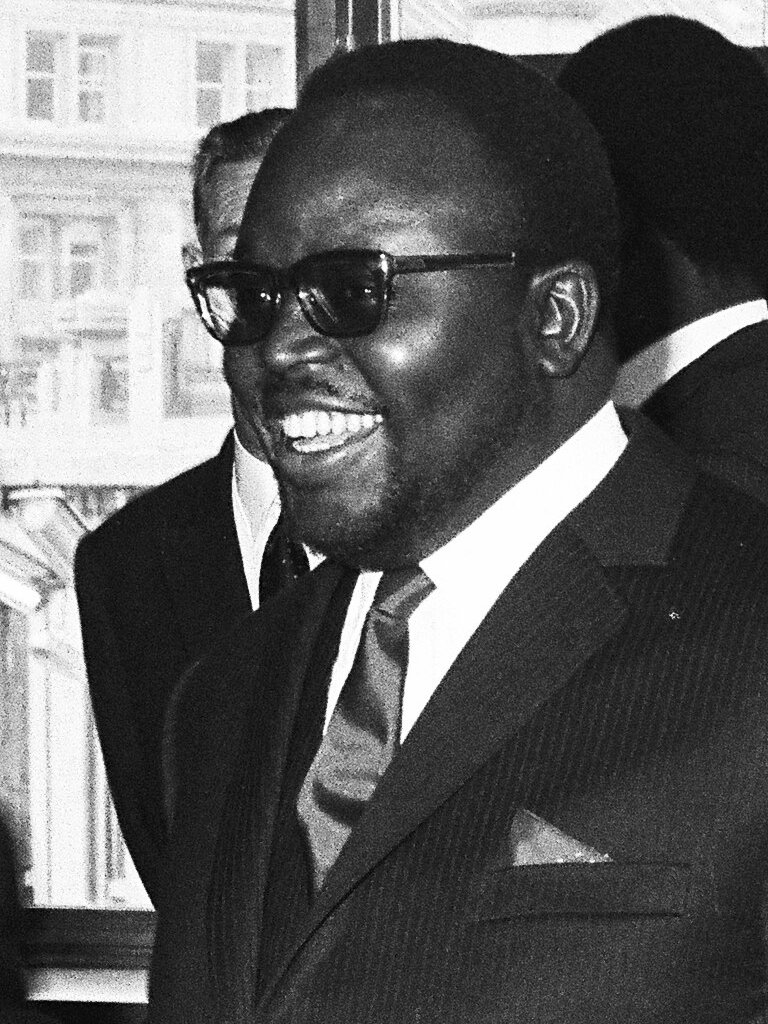
Bernardin Mungul Diaka in 1966

Bernardin Mungul Diaka (Kirondo (Bandundu), 12 November 1933 – Kinshasa, 3 June 1999) was a Congolese/Zairean diplomat and politician.

He started his career as the director of Minister of Defence Patrice Lumumba in 1960. After the Dissolution of the Lumumba Government by President Joseph Kasavubu, Lumumbist forces fled to Stanleyville (nowadays Kisangani) to found a rival government to the central government. This Stanleyville government was headed by Antoine Gizenga, who would send Mungul Diaka as his representative in the People's Republic of China. After the arrest of Gizenga, Mungul Diaka became the head of the Parti Solidaire Africain in February 1962. As an elected government member of the government of Kwilu Province, he was the Minister of Planning, but lost his position after a vote of no confidence and later became a deputy for Kwilu in 1965.

After the second coup d'état of Mobutu in 1965, new President Joseph-Désiré Mobutu appoint him the country's resident Minister to Belgium and the European Economic Community in 1967. He held several important executive functions throughout the years, including Minister of National Education, member of the executive committee of the Movement Populaire de la Révolution, and Minister of Higher Education, until he was revoked and imprisoned. He chose to go into exile to Belgium in 1980, where he stayed until 1985. Mungul Diaka was the Prime Minister of Zaire from 1 November 1991 to 25 November 1991. He was appointed by Mobutu Sese Seko and considered a moderate. He was also a governor of Kinshasa from 1992 to 1996.

Mungul Diaka was married to Nelly Kamashi Mungul Diaka Lumana (1946–2022), importer of Dutch wax fabric.

Political offices
Preceded by Étienne Tshisekedi	Prime Minister of Zaire; 1991	Succeeded by Jean Nguza Karl-i-Bond
