= Reformed Church of the Faith in Congo =

The Reformed Church of the Faith (French: Église réformée de la foi) was founded in 1993 and has grown from a group of four churches to 64 churches with over 5,000 members. This Reformed denomination is located primarily in the southern, Shaba region of the Democratic Republic of the Congo, formerly Zaire. Rev. Mfumwabana N'Kulu has been instrumental in the founding and growth of this Reformed denomination.
