= Malangu Kabedi Mbuyi =

Congolese economist (born 1958)

- Born: February 1, 1958 (age 68); Kananga, Kasaï-Occidental Province, Belgian Congo
- Citizenship: Congolese citizenship
- Education: Université libre de Bruxelles (ULB) (English: Free University of Brussels)
- Occupation: Central Bank Governor
- Title: Governor of the Central Bank of the Congo (BCC)
- Relatives: 1 husband & 2 children

Malangu Kabedi Mbuyi (born 1 February 1958), also Malangu Kabedi-Mbuyi, is a Congolese economist who was appointed Governor of the Central Bank of the Congo (French: Banque centrale du Congo) (BCC), on 30 June 2021. BCC is the central bank and national banking regulator in the Democratic Republic of the Congo. Malangu Kabedi is the first woman to serve as governor of the Central Bank of the Congo since the bank was established in 1961.

== Early life and education ==
Marie-France Malangu Kabedi Mbuyi was born in the town of Kananga, Kasaï-Occidental Province, in the Belgian Congo. She holds a bachelor's degree in economics and a master's degree in econometrics, both awarded by the Free University of Brussels.

== Career ==
She began her career in 1984. Her first job was at the Centre for Applied Economics at the Free University of Brussels, where she worked for a year as an economist. She was then hired by the BCC (at that time Bank of Zaire), where she worked in their research department for two years. She then joined the International Monetary Fund (IMF), working in Washington, D.C. as an economist in various capacities. Her work at the IMF lasted more than 30 years.

Her work at the IMF involved "statistical data management, analysis and macroeconomic projections". Her area of responsibility included Togo, Benin, Haiti, the Dominican Republic and Mali. She also served as the IMF resident representative for Benin and Togo in the 1990s, and then for Cameroon between 2005 and 2009. From 2015 until 2018 she served as the Director and Head of Mission at IMF's Regional Technical Assistance Centre for West Africa (AFRITAC-West). The centre is located in Abidjan, Ivory Coast and covers nine West African countries.

== Personal life ==
She speaks, reads, and writes fluently in two Congolese languages. She is also fluent in French and English and has a working knowledge of Spanish and Portuguese.
