= Scibe Airlift =

Airline from Zaire

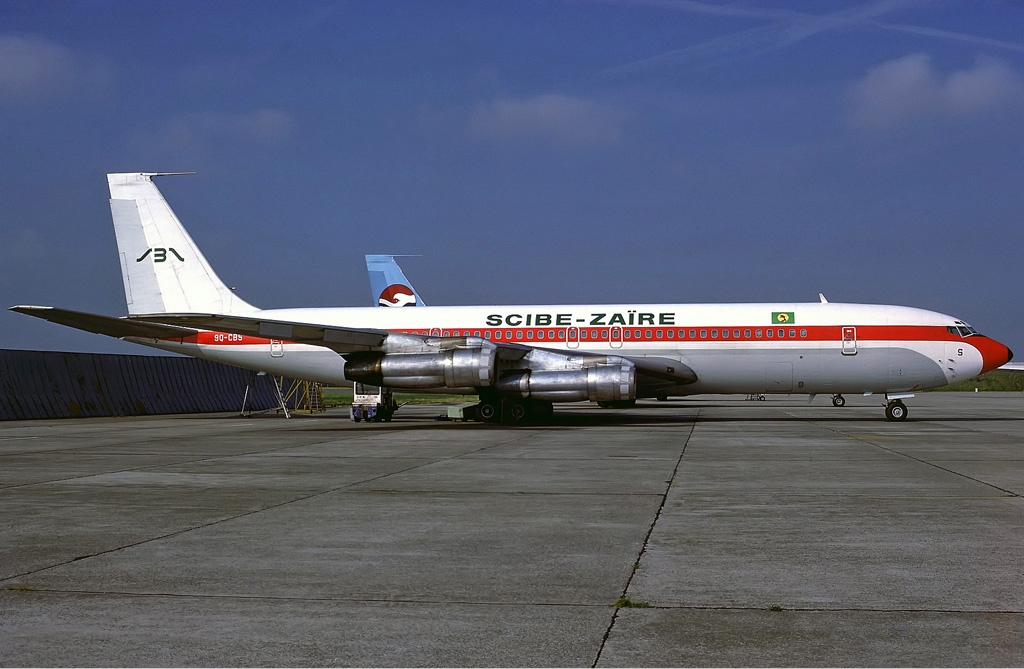
IATA	ICAO	Call sign
ZM	SBZ	SCIBE AIRLIFT
- Founded: 1976 (as SBZ Cargo)
- Ceased operations: 1998
- Operating bases: N'djili Airport
- Fleet size: max. 15 aircraft (in 1987)
- Headquarters: Kinshasa, Democratic Republic of the Congo (originally Zaire)
- Key people: Jeannot Bemba Saolona, President; Jose Numes, Chief Pilot

Scibe Airlift was an airline from Zaire (today known as Democratic Republic of the Congo), with its base at N'Djili Airport, Kinshasa.

== History ==
The airline started activities on October 22 1976 as SBZ Cargo (Société Bemba Zaire) with a single Vickers Viscount and shortly after a second aircraft was added to the fleet. Due to problems concerning the national airline, Air Zaire, Scibe Airlift became the first passenger airline in the country. In November of 1978 the airline received a singular Lockheed C 100 which flew to Europe in 1979. The airline was incorporated into the Scibe Group and was renamed Scibe Airlift Cargo Zaïre.

In 1982 the airline acquired its first aircraft which was a Boeing 727 used for cargo and passenger usage and in 1985 carried more passengers than the national airline Air Zaire. To further expand, the company acquired five used Fokker 27 aircraft, the latter of which were delivered in 1986. These were smaller propeller aircraft that were used for shorter regional services. In 1987,the airline's president Jeannot Bemba Saolona gave his son Jean-Pierre Bemba the airline.

After covering the whole country, it bought a Boeing 707, which allowed for serving Europe. In the early 1990s Scibe Airlift was at its height, serving a multitude of destinations and leasing its aircraft out to European airlines. In 1992, it operated a DC-10-30 on its Kinshasa-Brussels route. In 1994 its singular Learjet 24 was written off in an accident in Kinshasa. One of the company's leased Antonov 32s crashed into a market in Kinasha in 1996 which damaged the reputation of the airline significantly.

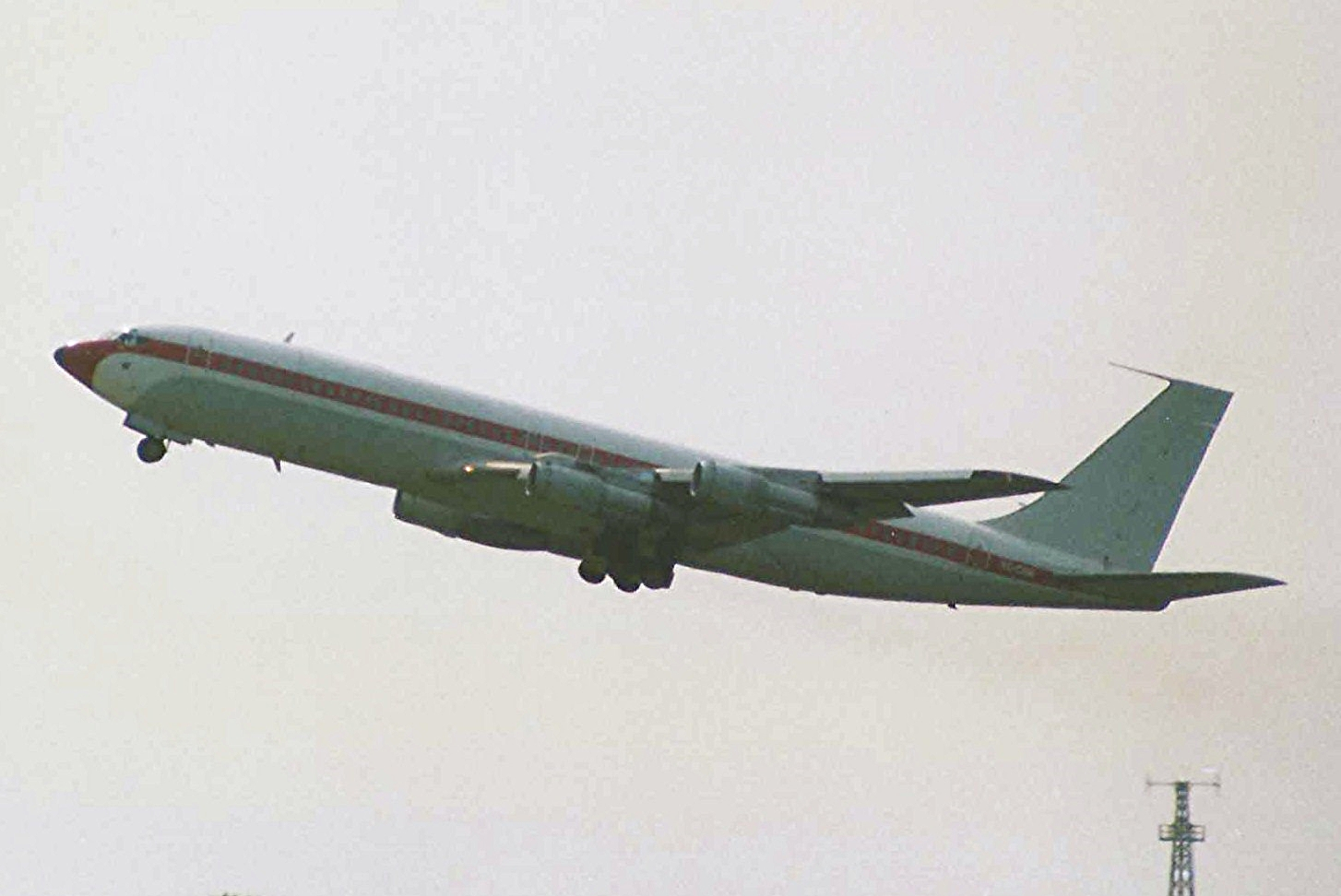
A Boeing 707 of Scibe Airlift taking off

The political instability of the country and the poor financial management of the company brought it to an end. Scibe Airlift ceased its operations on 29 September 1998 when its last aircraft was stored at London Southend Airport. Despite this the airline's holding company called Scibe was still active and used its own business jet for corporate use, which is probably why the company was on the EU blacklist up until 2006.

== Accidents and incidents ==
- On 13 December 1992 a Fokker F-27-400M operated by Scibe Airlift Cargo crashed with 37 fatalities about 10 km (6.3 mls) from Goma
- On 18 January 1994 a Learjet 24D operated by Scibe Airlift Cargo ran out of fuel and crashed on approach on a repositioning flight from Cotonou Airport (COO/DBBB), Benin to Kinshasa-N'djili Airport (FIH/FZAA) killing two crew.
- The 1996 Air Africa crash killed an estimated 297, mostly on the ground. It was a lease from Scibe.

== Historical fleet ==
- Beechcraft Super King Air 200
- Boeing 707-320 and 707-320C
- Boeing 727-100 and 727-100C
- Canadair CL-601-3A
- de Havilland Canada DHC-6-300
- Fokker 27-400M and Fokker 27-500
- Learjet 24D
- Lockheed L-100-30
- McDonnell Douglas DC-10-10 and DC-10-30
- Pilatus PC-6/B Turbo Porter
- Vickers Viscount 757 and 880C

== See also ==
- Transport in the Democratic Republic of the Congo
