= Faustin Birindwa =

Congolese politician (1943–1999)

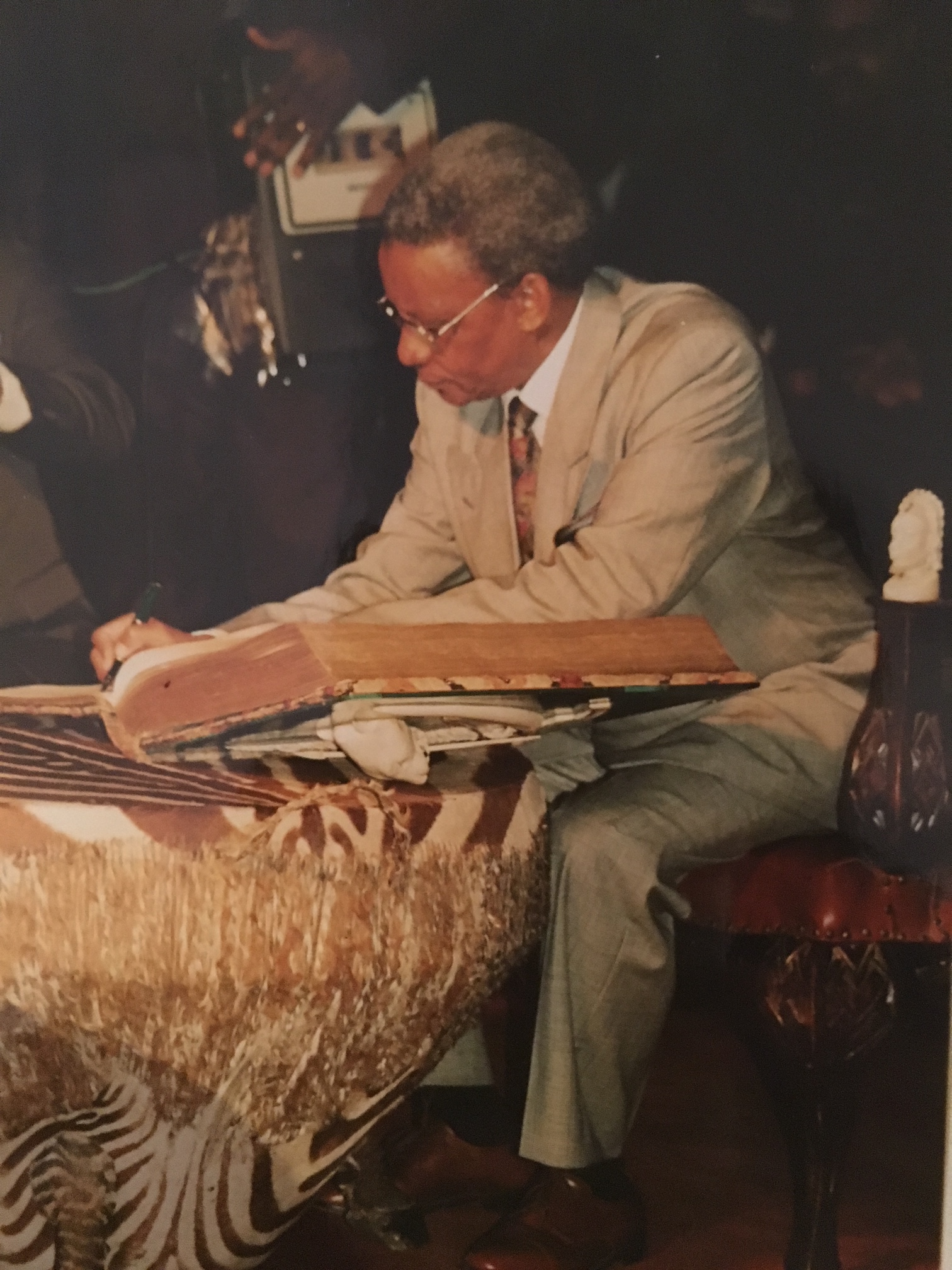

Prime Minister of Zaire
- In office 18 March 1993 – 14 January 1994
- President: Mobutu Sese Seko
- Preceded by: Étienne Tshisekedi
- Succeeded by: Kengo Wa Dondo

Personal details
- Born: 1940
- Died: 29 April 1999
- Political party: Union for Democracy and Social Progress

Faustin Birindwa (1943 – 29 April 1999) was a Congolese politician. A technocrat, he was a founding member of the UDPS party to and he was appointed Minister of Finance in the first government UDPS, led by Etienne Tshisekedi.

He became finance minister in August 1992. After Tshisekedi was dismissed by Mobutu Sese Seko, Birindwa became prime minister on 18 March 1993 as a member of the UDPS forces Forces Politiques du Conclave.

As prime minister, Birindwa attempted to deal with the economic crisis. He announced monetary reform and instituted a new currency in September 1993. Nonetheless, inflation by the end of the year was estimated at 90 percent. In 1994, after a decision by the Haut Conseil de la Republique/Parlement de Transition, Birindwa stepped down as prime minister. He was succeeded by Kengo Wa Dondo, whose election in June 1994 was controversial among the opposition. Birindwa died on 29 April 1999 in Italy.
