= Kahemba Airport =

- IATA: none; ICAO: FZCF

Summary
- Airport type: Public
- Serves: Kahemba, Democratic Republic of the Congo
- Elevation AMSL: 3,425 ft (1,044 m)
- Coordinates: 7°20′25″S 18°59′20″E

Map
- Location within DRC

Runways
Direction	Length		Surface
Direction	m	ft	Surface
16/34	1,100	3,609	Gravel
- Sources: GCM Google Maps

Kahemba Airport (ICAO: FZCF) is 5 kilometres (3.1 mi) southeast of the city of Kahemba in Kwango Province, Democratic Republic of the Congo.

== See also ==
- Transport in the Democratic Republic of the Congo
- List of airports in the Democratic Republic of the Congo
