= Lunda Bululu =

Congolese politician

Prime Minister of Zaire
- In office 5 July 1990 – 1 April 1991
- President: Mobuto Sese Seko
- Preceded by: Leon Kengo wa Dondo

Minister of Foreign Affairs
- In office 1994–1995
- President: Mobutu Sese Seko
- Preceded by: Mpinga Kasenda
- Succeeded by: Gérard Kamanda wa Kamanda

Personal details
- Born: Vincent de Paul Lunda Bululu; 15 October 1942 (age 84) Mwena Mulota, Katanga Province, Belgian Congo
- Education: University of Lubumbashi (Doctor of Laws); Free University of Brussels

Vincent de Paul Lunda Bululu (born 15 October 1942) is a Congolese former politician. He served as the Prime Minister of Zaire from 5 July 1990 to 1 April 1991. He previously served as First State Commissioner of Zaire from 4 May 1990 to 5 July 1990. He attended the University of Lubumbashi and earned a Doctor of Laws degree.

== Biography ==
Vincent de Paul Lunda Bululu was born on 15 October 1942 in Mwena Mulota, Katanga Province, Belgian Congo. He received a Doctor of Laws degree from the University of Lubumbashi in 1966, and later received other degrees in law from the Free University of Brussels. Lunda Bululu taught at his alma mater and the University of Kinshasa before serving as an advisor in the office of the president of Zaire from 1980 to 1985. He then served as secretary-general of the Economic Community of Central African States until 1990.

In May 1990, he became the prime minister of Zaire, and became part of the Rassemblement des forces sociales et federalistes (RSF). Lunda Bululu participated in the Sovereign National Conference. He then served as minister of foreign affairs in the government of Leon Kengo wa Dondo, from July 1994 until 1995. Years later, during the Second Congo War, he joined the Rwandan-backed Rally for Congolese Democracy (RCD), where he was the spokesman and the coordinator of the executive committee. In May 1999 he joined Jean-Pierre Bemba's Movement for the Liberation of the Congo (MLC). At the end of the war, Lunda Bululu became a member of the Transitional Government's parliament. He announced his candidacy for the presidency in the 2006 general election on 14 June 2006.
