= Libenge =

- Town
- Location within Democratic Republic of the Congo
- Coordinates: 3°39′3″N 18°38′15″E
- Country: DR Congo
- Province: Sud-Ubangi
- Communes: Libenge

Population (2016)
  - Total: 27,053
- Time zone: UTC+1 (WAT)

Libenge is a town in Sud-Ubangi Province in the Democratic Republic of the Congo (DRC). As of 2016, the population of Libenge is 27,053. The nearest town is Mongoumba, 4 kilometres (2.5 mi) southwest of the city. The Congolese politician Léon Kengo was born in this town in 1935.

== Transport ==
The town is served by Libenge Airport.
