= Étienne Tshisekedi =

Congolese politician (1932–2017)

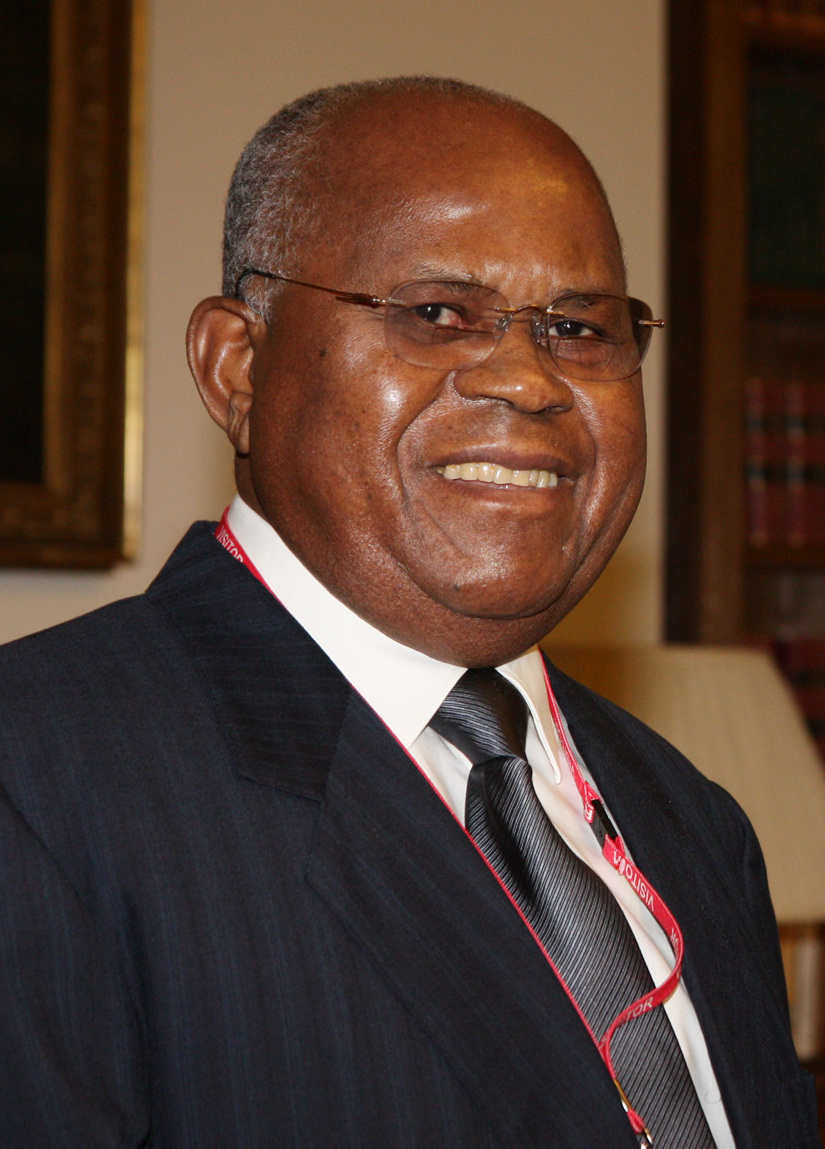
- Tshisekedi in 2011

Prime Minister of Zaire
- In office 2 April 1997 – 9 April 1997
- President: Mobutu Sese Seko
- Preceded by: Léon Kengo wa Dondo
- Succeeded by: Likulia Bolongo
- In office 15 August 1992 – 18 March 1993
- President: Mobutu Sese Seko
- Preceded by: Jean Nguza Karl-i-Bond
- Succeeded by: Faustin Birindwa
- In office 29 September 1991 – 1 November 1991
- President: Mobutu Sese Seko
- Preceded by: Mulumba Lukoji
- Succeeded by: Bernardin Mungul Diaka

Personal details
- Born: Étienne Tshisekedi wa Mulumba; 14 December 1932 Luluabourg, Belgian Congo (now Kananga, Kasaï-Occidental, Congo-Kinshasa)
- Died: 1 February 2017 (aged 84) Brussels, Belgium
- Party: Union for Democracy and Social Progress
- Spouse: Marthe Jibikila (?–2017; his death)
- Children: Félix Tshisekedi, Christiane Tshisekedi
- Education: Lovanium University

Étienne Tshisekedi wa Mulumba (14 December 1932 – 1 February 2017) was a Congolese politician and the leader of the Union for Democracy and Social Progress (UDPS), formerly the main opposition political party in the Democratic Republic of the Congo (DRC). A long-time opposition leader, he served as Prime Minister of the country (then called Zaire) on three brief occasions: in 1991, 1992–1993, and 1997. He was also the father of the current President, Felix Tshisekedi.

Tshisekedi was the main Congolese opposition leader for decades. Although he served in the government of Mobutu Sese Seko in various positions, he also led the campaign against Mobutu, and was one of few politicians who challenged the dictator.

Tshisekedi and his UDPS party boycotted the 2006 elections organized in Congo on claims that elections were fraudulent and were systematically rigged in advance.

He was a candidate for President of Congo in the 2011 elections that many national and international observers, notably the Carter Center, have said lacked credibility and transparency. Having officially lost to incumbent Joseph Kabila, Tshisekedi nevertheless declared himself the "elected president" of Congo. Policemen and Kabila's presidential guards were subsequently stationed at every corner that gives entrance to Tshisekedi's residence, placing him under unofficial house arrest. His son Félix became president in 2019.

== Early life and education ==
In 1932, Étienne Tshisekedi, son of Alexis Mulumba and his wife Agnès Kabena, was born in Luluabourg, Belgian Congo (now called Kananga, Kasai-Occidental, Democratic Republic of the Congo). Ethnically, he was a member of the Luba people. Tshisekedi attended primary school at Kabaluanda (West Kasai) and obtained a licentiate diploma in 1961 at the Lovanium University School of Law in Leopoldville (now Kinshasa); he was the first Congolese to ever get a doctorate diploma in law.

== Political career ==
Tshisekedi's career was intertwined with the political history of his country; Congo won independence in 1960 from Belgium.

=== 1960 to 2001 ===
Advisor to Patrice Lumumba of the Mouvement National Congolais (MNC), Tshisekedi left the MNC to follow Albert Kalonji on his secessionist adventure in Kasai, acting as Minister of Justice in the newly autonomous State of South Kasai.

On 3 January 1961 President Joseph Kasa-Vubu appointed Tshisekedi Director General of the National School of Law and Administration.

In November 1965, Tshisekedi took part in the second Mobutu coup which led to the dismissal of President Kasavubu and his prime minister Kimba. Tshisekedi approved the execution of Kimba and his companions on the day of Pentecost, 2 June 1966.

He was a high-ranking member of the various governments formed by dictator Mobutu Sese Seko, who was president from 1965 to 1997. Tshisekedi helped amend the Congolese Constitution in 1967. After the second coup of Mobutu, in 1965, Tshisekedi held ministerial positions. As such, Tshisekedi was instrumental in managing the country, allegedly based on the misappropriation of public funds and neutralization of all opposition. Tshisekedi remained in the Central Committee of the Popular Movement of the Revolution (Mouvement Populaire de la Revolution, MPR) until the early 1980s.

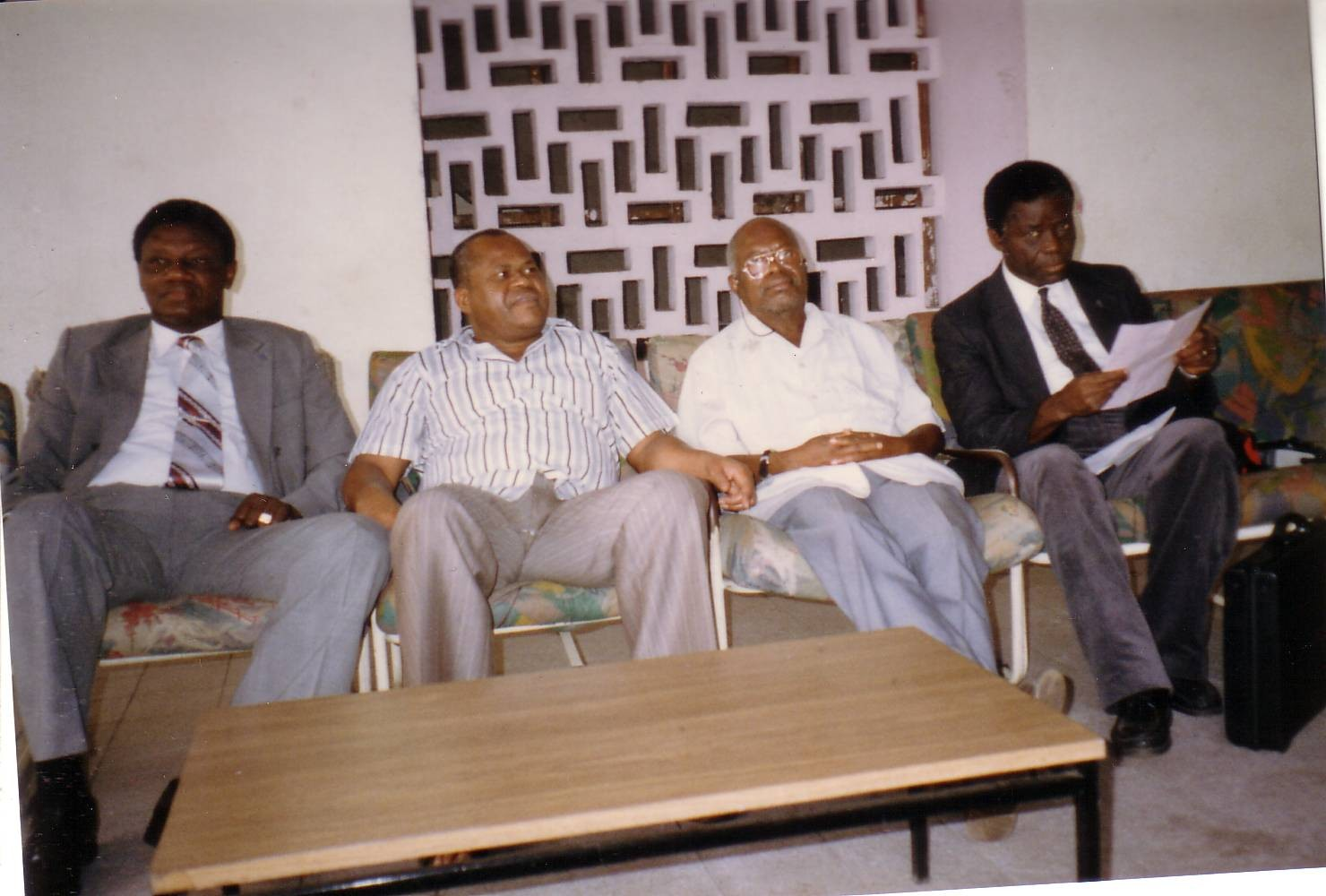
Tshisekedi with founding members of the UDPS, from left to right: Frédéric Kibassa Maliba, Tshisekedi, Vincent Mbwakiem, and Marcel Lihau

Relations with Mobutu ruptured around 1980, and Tshisekedi was removed from Mobutu's government. At that time, Tshisekedi formed the country's first opposition party, the Union for Democracy and Social Progress (UDPS), to counter the ruling MPR. Tshisekedi thus became the main voice for opponents of the dictatorship, in the country that was then called Zaire. That status enabled him to mobilize public opinion and the international community, and he continued advocating for change during Mobutu's tenure. In 1980, Tshisekedi was thrown in prison for criticism of Mobutu's repressive regime; he was imprisoned numerous times by Mobutu's government.

In 1989, during Mobutu's rule, several cases of his detention were described as unlawful by the United Nations Human Rights Committee.

On 15 February 1982, Tshisekedi co-founded the Union for Democracy and Social Progress (UDPS). The party remains popular in Congo's capital Kinshasa, the two Kasai and Bas-Congo provinces as well as other provinces, with its main goal being a non-violent change to democratic rule.

According to Kapinga (vice-president of the MPR), Mobutu kept a number of Congolese tribes happy through the "sharing of money" with the tribes' power brokers. Under Mobutu's regime, Aponet Potia (Secretary General of the MPR) tried delivering money to Tshisekedi in the middle of the night, but Tshisekedi refused it. Mobutu tried and failed on several occasions to persuade Tshisekedi to take the money.

With the country in economic turmoil in the early 1990s, partly due to Mobutu's loss of Western support after the Cold War, Mobutu bowed to pressure and promised a transition to multiparty democracy. Tshisekedi, who was Mobutu's most determined and popular rival, became Prime Minister on three separate occasions. The first lasted only one month (29 September 1991 – 1 November 1991) before Mobutu sacked him, and the second only seven months (15 August 1992 – 18 March 1993). Both times, Tshisekedi asserted that he was prevented from functioning properly by Mobutu. The third term, while Laurent-Désiré Kabila's rebel forces were marching on Kinshasa, lasted only a week (2 April 1997 – 9 April 1997) and was again ended by Mobutu's lack of cooperation. A month later Laurent Kabila overthrew Mobutu, in connection with the First Congo War.

Laurent Kabila ruled by decree and banned party politics until general elections planned for 1999. In 1998, a constitutional committee drew up a list of 250 people who would not be allowed to run for president, including Tshisekedi. He was sent into internal exile in February 1998, after he was accused of violating the ban on party politics.

President Laurent Kabila was assassinated in 2001, and was succeeded ten days later by his son, Joseph Kabila. Tshisekedi refused to enter the government of Joseph Kabila, or the previous government of his father, and likened them to Mobutu.

=== 2005–2006 elections ===
In the run-up to the 2006 national elections, Tshisekedi decided to boycott the electoral process and the constitutional referendum because he believed they were rigged in advance.

Joseph Kabila won the presidential election. Tshisekedi considered the elections of 2006 to be a "masquerade" and claimed that Kabila's election was decided in advance by influential people outside Congo. Kabila defeated Jean-Pierre Bemba, with Tshisekedi on the sidelines.

=== 2011 elections ===
At a UDPS meeting in April 2009, the party indicated that it would participate in the 2011 election, and asked that Tshisekedi be their presidential candidate. He officially confirmed his candidacy in December 2010 at a congress of his party in Kinshasa, which was the first official party congress since the party formed in 1982.

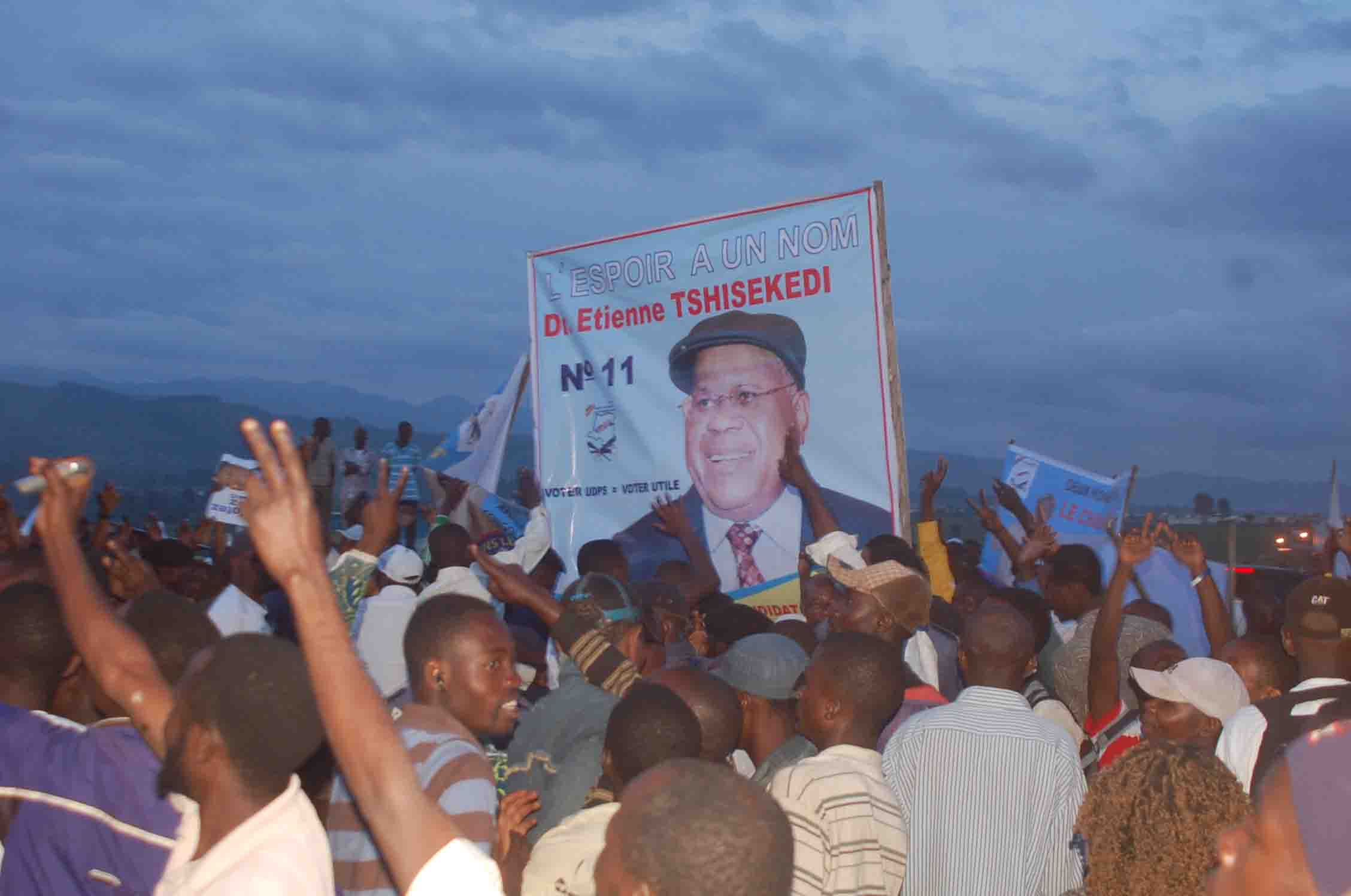
Étienne Tshisekedi campaign sign

In August 2011, Tshisekedi sought to negotiate with other opposition parties to form a joint effort against incumbent Joseph Kabila. This is Tshisekedi's first bid for the presidency since forming the country's first opposition party in 1982. Candidates campaigned relatively freely, and Tshisekedi held large rallies. But neither candidate was prepared to admit defeat."

Tshisekedi pointed not only to lack of democracy, but also lack of water and electricity, as reasons to elect him. He said that a vote for him would be a vote for a 30-year fight to uphold the rule of law and good governance in Congo. Tshisekedi was supported by about 80 political parties, but he had adversaries within the opposition, such as Vital Kamerhe, Nzanga Mobutu (son of the former dictator), and Senate president Kengo Wa Dondo. Tshisekedi said that none of them had been in the opposition long enough to be credible.

This time around, Bemba (the 2006 presidential candidate) was sidelined, on trial at the International Criminal Court in The Hague for alleged war crimes in 2002–2003. The election was held on 28 November 2011.

Many national and international observers, notably the Carter Center, said the election was marred with serious irregularities and lacked credibility and transparency. Tshisekedi rejected the results announced by the CENI, the body responsible for the organization of elections, saying that they did not reflect the will of the people, and declared himself the "elected president" of Congo. Tshisekedi held a private inauguration ceremony after police used tear gas to disperse a public inauguration.

Vital Kamerhe, a former ally of President Kabila, rejected the results announced by the CENI and said that Tshisekedi had actually won the election. Several other opposition candidates recognized Tshisekedi as the victor, and called for the election to be annulled.

In addition to the Carter Center, an observer mission from the European Union noted lack of transparency, and the archbishop of Kinshasa, Cardinal Laurent Monsengwo Pasinya claimed that the results announced by the CENI did not reflect the will of the people. These and other observations compromised the integrity of the presidential election, according to the Carter Center. MONUSCO, the peacekeeping mission of the United Nations, also voiced concern about the results.

The election result was confirmed by the Supreme Court of the Democratic Republic of Congo. A day after holding a hearing of the Senate Foreign Relations Subcommittee on African Affairs on governance in the DRC, Senators Chris Coons (D-Del.) and Johnny Isakson (R-Ga.) of the United States Senate expressed deep concern about the ruling of the Congolese Supreme Court. Then, on 20 December 2011, U.S. Secretary of State Hillary Clinton expressed serious disappointment with the Congolese supreme court decision.

Tshisekedi urged the armed forces to disobey Kabila, and added that he would offer a "great prize" to anyone who captured President Joseph Kabila.

=== Post-2011 election ===
Tshisekedi's party headquarters was burglarized after his inauguration. Tshisekedi was said to be under house arrest.

The rebel March 23 Movement, which captured the city of Goma in November 2012, listed the release of Tshisekedi as one of their demands and claimed to be willing to leave the provincial capital of North Kivu if he was granted freedom of movement, among other things.

Amidst rumors of serious health problems, Tshisekedi was flown to Belgium for treatment on 16 August 2014. Responding to the rumors about his condition, his party said that he was not seriously ill. On 9 January 2016, Tshisekedi, who was still in Brussels and apparently still ill, released a video message in which he vowed that he would "soon be among you so we can unite our efforts to win". Observers noted that the opposition leader seemed "frail" and had trouble speaking. He finally returned to Congo on 27 July 2016 and was greeted by a massive crowd of supporters upon arrival at the airport in Kinshasa. At a massive rally in Kinshasa on 31 July, Tshisekedi demanded that elections proceed on schedule before the end of 2016, contrary to suggestions from the authorities that a delay might be necessary, allowing Kabila to remain in office.

=== Death ===
On 24 January 2017, Tshisekedi left the DRC to travel to Belgium for medical treatment. The 84-year-old died a week later on 1 February in Brussels.

Political offices
Preceded by Mulumba Lukoji	Prime Minister of Zaire; 1991	Succeeded by Bernardin Mungul Diaka
Preceded by Jean Nguza Karl-i-Bond	Prime Minister of Zaire; 1992–1993	Succeeded by Faustin Birindwa
Preceded by Léon Kengo	Prime Minister of Zaire; 1997	Succeeded by Likulia Bolongo
