= Jules Fontaine Sambwa =

Zairean political officeholder and economist (1940–1998)

Jules-Fontaine Sambwa (12 November 1940 – 4 March 1998) was a Zairean political officeholder and economist.

== Biography ==
Jules-Fontaine Sambwa Pida Nbagui was born in Mbandaka, on 12 November 1940. He died on 4 March 1998. After graduating in Economy and Finance at the University of Brussels in 1967, he exercised the following high offices in the Republic of Zaire:

- Economic council at the President's Office (1967–1969)
- Assistant director at the President's Office and then, council at the Bank of Zaire (1969–1970)
- Administrator at the SOFIDE (1970)
- Governor of the Bank of Zaire (from September 1970 to August 1977)
- Assistant director at the President's Office (from March 1979 to August 1980)
- Governor of the Bank of Zaire (from August 1980 to April 1985)
- Minister of Economy and Industry (1985)
- State minister of the Plan (from April 1985 to September 1987)
- Vice-premier Commissioner of the Zaire government in charge with the economic sectors (from September 1987 to April 1988)
- First commissioner of State of the Zaire government (from April 1988 to November 1988)
- President of the Court of Accounts (from November 1988 to January 1990)
- Minister of Finance of Zaire (from March 1993 to April 1993 and from April 1993 to July 1994)

At the same time, he was also a professor at the University of Kinshasa where, as part of the Faculty of Economy, he was "titular to the class of international economy".

Visiting Europe since 1991, Jules-Fontaine Sambwa carried on his research and studies on the development of Sub-Saharan Africa until his death.

His care for a positive contribution to the reflection of diverse intellectuals on the emergence of rules of law in Sub-Saharan Africa made him accept the office of President of the “Zaire Club 2000” in 1994.

== Awards ==
He had been promised to the following honorary distinctions:

- Grand Cordon de l’Ordre national du Léopard (Zaïre);
- Commandeur de l’Ordre de la Couronne (Belgique);
- Commandeur de l’Ordre national de la Légion d'honneur (France);
- Commandeur de l’Ordre national de la République tunisienne.
