= Léon Kengo wa Dondo =

Congolese 1st state commissioner

Léon Kengo
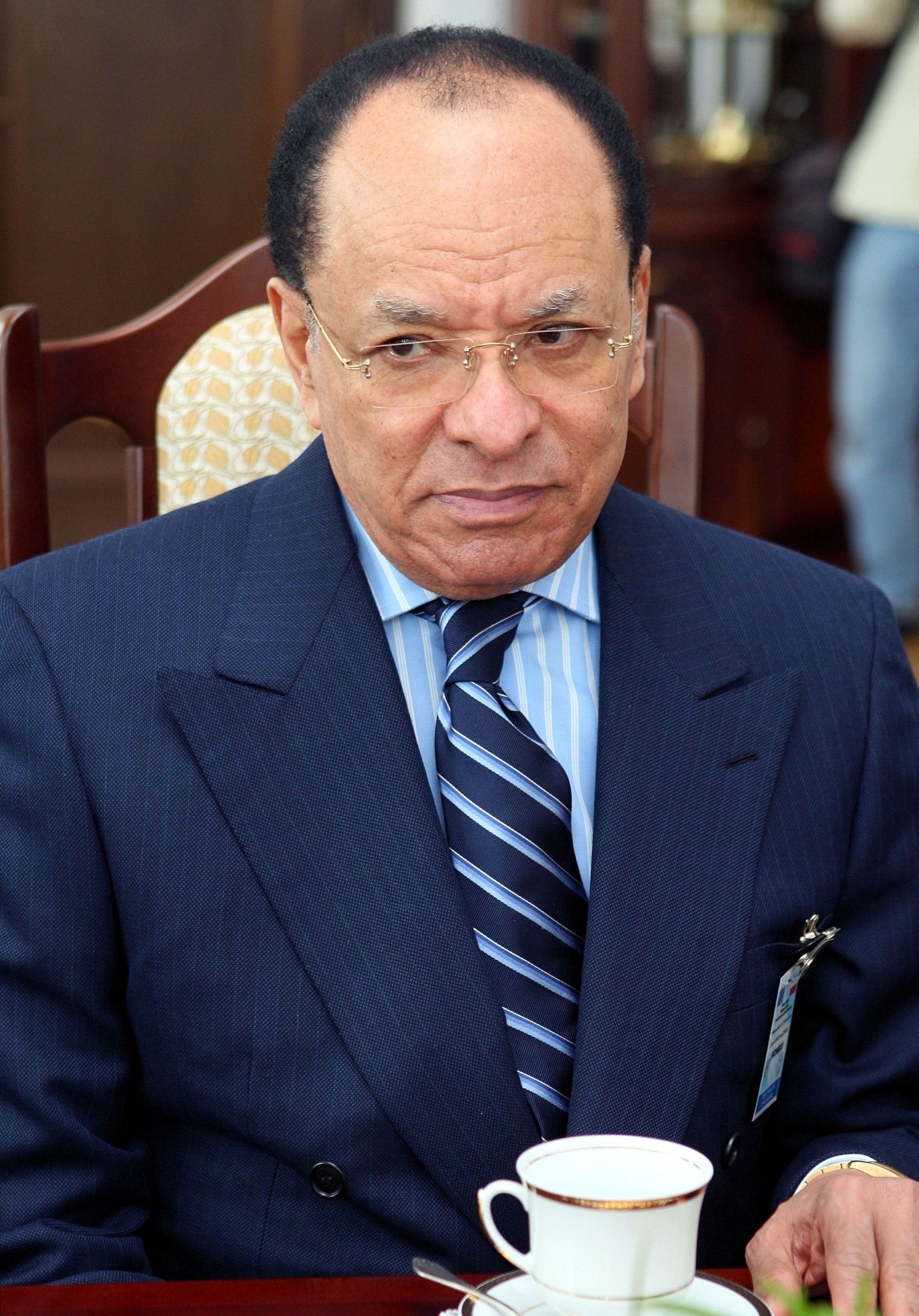
- Léon Kengo in the Polish Senate (2008)

12th Prime Minister of Zaire
- In office 5 November 1982 – 31 October 1986
- President: Mobutu Sese Seko
- Preceded by: N'singa Udjuu Ongwabeki Untubu
- Succeeded by: Position abolished
- In office 26 November 1988 – 4 May 1990
- President: Mobutu Sese Seko
- Preceded by: Sambwa Pida Nbagui
- Succeeded by: Lunda Bululu
- In office 6 July 1994 – 2 April 1997
- President: Mobutu Sese Seko
- Preceded by: Faustin Birindwa
- Succeeded by: Étienne Tshisekedi

President of the Senate of Congo
- In office 11 May 2007 – 5 April 2019
- Preceded by: Pierre Marini Bodho
- Succeeded by: Léon Mamboleo

Personal details
- Born: Leon Lubicz; 22 May 1935 (age 91) Libenge (Équateur province), Belgian Congo
- Party: Popular Movement of the Revolution; Union of Forces of Change
- Education: Université libre de Bruxelles (1962–1968, PhD in Law)

Léon Kengo wa Dondo (born Leon Lubicz; 22 May 1935) is a Congolese politician who served as the First State Commissioner (a title equivalent to prime minister) several times under Mobutu Sese Seko in Zaïre. He was one of the most powerful figures in the regime and was a strong advocate of economic globalization and free-market economics. He served as President of the Senate of the Democratic Republic of the Congo from 2007 to 2019.

== Early life ==
Kengo was born in Libenge, Équateur province, Belgian Congo (later Zaire and now Democratic Republic of Congo). He is the son of a Polish Jewish father, Michał Lubicz, and a Rwandan Tutsi mother. He changed his name to Kengo wa Dondo in 1971 during Mobutu's Africanization (Authenticité) campaign.

== Career ==
On 11 April 1968, Kengo was appointed Procureur Général of the Kinshasa Court of Appeal. On 14 August he was promoted to Procureur Général of the Supreme Court of Justice of the Democratic Republic of the Congo. In 1974 a new constitution was promulgated that changed the Congo's name to Zaire and concentrated the government's authority in Mobutu Sese Seko as president. Kengo, as one of the country's senior-most magistrates, supported the independence of the judiciary and, despite Mobutu's centralisation, interpreted the document as only veiling such autonomy, not eliminating it. He argued that the Judicial Council of the Mouvement Populaire de la Révolution, the state party, was the most independent branch in comparison to its counterparts. He also said that a magistrate's prerogative to construe law was "a breach in the plenary powers exercised by the President."

=== Prime Minister of Mobutu ===
After serving as his country's ambassador to Belgium, Kengo served as prime minister for the first time from 1982 to 1986, appointing able technocrats to important positions, such as Munga Mibindo, President Delegate General of the National Electrical Utility. He then served as foreign minister from 1986 to 1987 and as prime minister again from 1988 to 1990. During the early 1990s Mobutu allowed a transitional parliament to be set up, and Kengo was chosen prime minister by it in 1994 as a candidate in an attempt to neutralise the challenge from the popular opposition politician Étienne Tshisekedi. He expelled members of the Lebanese community from Zaire for alleged involvement in the illegal trade of conflict diamonds, though the credibility of such actions is perhaps challenged by the fact that trade in conflict diamonds from Angola had long been essential to the survival of the Mobutu regime, in which Kengo had been such an important figure.

Shortly after the beginning of the Congo civil war, in December 1996, Kengo became the leader of a crisis cabinet which sought to defeat the rebellion of Laurent Kabila. He was undermined by many Mobutu supporters because of his Tutsi origins, as Kabila's rebels were allied with the Tutsi governments of Rwanda and Burundi. As Kabila's armies advanced through the country, Kengo was also criticized for not conducting the war very well. He announced his resignation in March 1997 and left office in April 1997. The Mobutu government fell a month later, and Kengo retired from politics. In 2003, he was charged with money laundering in Belgium.

=== President of the Senate of Congo ===
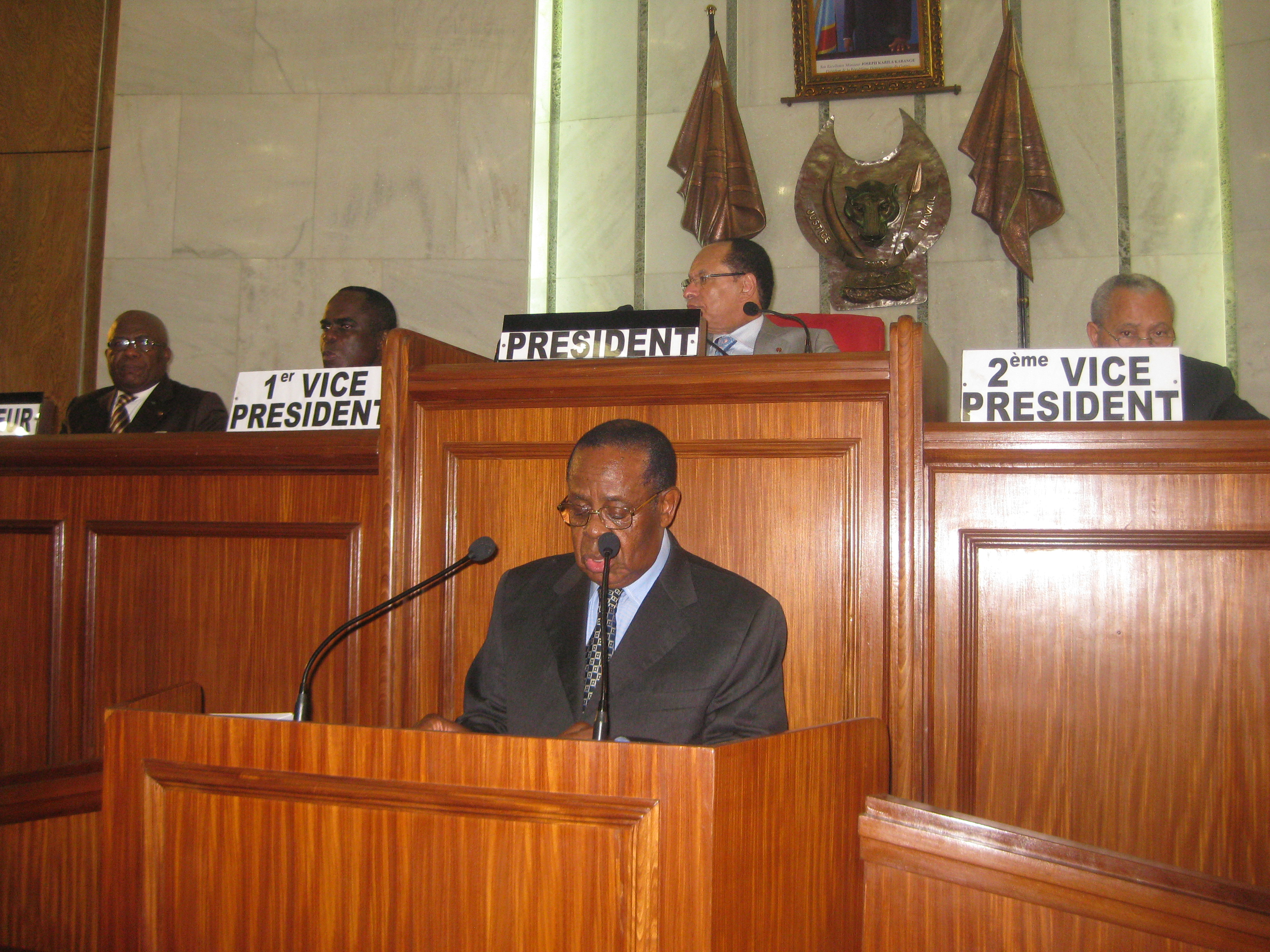
Charles Mwando Nsimba addressing the Senate with Kengo presiding

Following his return to the Democratic Republic of the Congo, Kengo backed Jean-Pierre Bemba in the 2006 presidential election; Bemba was defeated by President Joseph Kabila in the second round of the election. Kengo was then elected as a Senator from Équateur province in January 2007. On 11 May 2007, Kengo was somewhat unexpectedly elected as President of the Senate, defeating Léonard She Okitundu, the candidate of the majority coalition, the Alliance of the Presidential Majority. Kengo, who was an independent candidate, took 55 votes against 49 for Okitundu. On 31 December 2011, Léon Kengo was attacked by Congolese activists in front of the Gare du Nord train station in Paris, France. On 21 January 2015 during the 2015 Congolese protests he met with American, Belgian, British and French diplomats who urged him to either suspend debate and voting on the election modifying law or to remove its controversial provisions. He served as Senate president until 5 April 2019.
