= 1981 in Zaire =

- Decades: 1970s; 1980s; 1990s
- See also: History of Zaire

The following lists events that happened during 1981 in Zaire.

== Incumbents ==
- President: Mobutu Sese Seko
- Prime Minister: Jean Nguza Karl-i-Bond – N'Singa Udjuu

== Events ==
Date	event
	National University of Zaire is split back to its original constituents: University of Kinshasa, University of Kisangani, and University of Lubumbashi.
23 April	N'Singa Udjuu is appointed prime minister
9 August	Troops are delopyed to defend key positions in Kinshasa, including the post office, the radio station and the palace of President Mobutu Sese Seko.

== See also ==
- Zaire
- History of the Democratic Republic of the Congo

== Sources ==
- Cowell, Alan (9 August 1981), "Zaire Army Guards Key Kinshasa Sites", New York Times
