= 1980 in Zaire =

- Decades: 1970s; 1980s; 1990s
- See also: History of Zaire

The following lists events that happened during 1980 in Zaire.

== Incumbents ==
- President: Mobutu Sese Seko
- Prime Minister: André Bo-Boliko Lokonga – Jean Nguza Karl-i-Bond

== Events ==
Date	event
16 February	Solar eclipse of February 16, 1980 causes total darkness in some parts of Zaire
27 August	Jean Nguza Karl-i-Bond is appointed prime minister.

== Births ==
- 30 December - D.J. Mbenga, basketball player

== See also ==
- Zaire
- History of the Democratic Republic of the Congo
