= 1970 in the Democratic Republic of the Congo =

- Decades: 1950s; 1960s; 1970s; 1980s; 1990s
- See also: Other events of 1970; History of the DRC

The following lists events that happened during 1970 in the Democratic Republic of the Congo.

== Incumbents ==
- President – Mobutu Sese Seko

== Events ==
Date	event
	The Compagnie du chemin de fer du bas-Congo au Katanga was taken over the Compagnie de chemin de fer de Kinshasa-Dilolo-Lubumbashi (KDL).
5 August	Barthélemy Mukenge (1925–2018) appointed governor of Kivu Province.
1 November	In the 1970 Democratic Republic of the Congo presidential election the sole candidate, Mobutu Sese Seko won with slightly more votes than the number of eligible voters,
15 November	In the 1970 Democratic Republic of the Congo parliamentary election 99% of those casting valid votes approved the Popular Movement of the Revolution (MPR) list. The MPR was the only party allowed to field candidates-

== Sources ==
- "Congo (Kinshasa) Provinces", Rulers.org
- Lodge, Tom; Kadima, Denis; Pottie, David, eds. (2002), "Democratic Republic of Congo", Compendium of Elections in Southern Africa, African Democracy Encyclopaedia Project 68-70, archived from the original on 30 January 2019
