= 1982 in Zaire =

- Decades: 1970s; 1980s; 1990s
- See also: History of Zaire

The following lists events that happened during 1982 in Zaire.

== Incumbents ==
- President: Mobutu Sese Seko
- Prime Minister: N'Singa Udjuu – Léon Kengo wa Dondo

== Events ==
Date	event
	The Presbyterian Community in Western Kasai is founded as a result of a split in the Presbyterian Community in Congo.
15 February	The Union for Democracy and Social Progress is founded
18–19 September	The Popular Movement of the Revolution is the only party allowed to field candidates in the Zairean parliamentary election
5 November	Léon Kengo wa Dondo is appointed prime minister.

== See also ==
- Zaire
- History of the Democratic Republic of the Congo

== Sources ==
- Communauté presbytérienne au Kasai occidental / Communauté presbytérienne réformée en Afrique, reformed online, 2002, archived from the original on 2023-01-28
