= 1979 in Zaire =

- Decades: 1970s; 1980s; 1990s
- See also: History of Zaire

The following lists events that happened during 1979 in Zaire.

== Incumbents ==
- President: Mobutu Sese Seko
- Prime Minister: Mpinga Kasenda – André Bo-Boliko Lokonga

== Events ==
Date	event
6 February	Belgian government announces deployment of 250 troops to support of the Zaire government.
6 March	André Bo-Boliko Lokonga becomes prime minister of Zaire
14 October	Presidents José Eduardo dos Santos of Angola, Mobutu Sese Seko of Zaire and Kenneth Kaunda of Zambia sign the Southern Africa Non-aggression Pact.

== See also ==
- Zaire
- History of the Democratic Republic of the Congo

== Sources ==
- Congo-Kinshasa/Zaire/Democratic Republic of Congo (1960-present)
