= 1967 in the Democratic Republic of the Congo =

- Decades: 1940s; 1950s; 1960s; 1970s; 1980s
- See also: Other events of 1967; History of the DRC

The following lists events that happened during 1967 in the Democratic Republic of the Congo.

== Incumbents ==
- President – Mobutu Sese Seko

== Events ==
Date	event
	The band Super Vox is formed, precursor to Orchestra Super Mazembe.
	Laurent-Désiré Kabila founds the People's Revolutionary Party (PRP) and creates a secessionist Marxist state in South Kivu province.
19/20 May	Manifesto of N'sele sets out the official political stance of the Popular Movement of the Revolution founded by Joseph-Désiré Mobutu in 1966.
4–16 June	1967 Democratic Republic of the Congo constitutional referendum approved by 97.8% of voters, abolishes presidential term limits and limits the number of political parties to two
July	Second of the Stanleyville mutinies led by Jean Schramme lasts from July to November, when it was crushed

== Sources ==
- De la Peña, Maxi (5 May 2005), "Un Estimulante Reencuentro con la Orchestra Super Mazembe", El Diario Montañés (in Spanish)
