= 1985 in Zaire =

- Decades: 1970s; 1980s; 1990s
- See also: History of Zaire

The following lists events that happened during 1985 in Zaire.

== Incumbents ==
- President: Mobutu Sese Seko
- Prime Minister: Léon Kengo wa Dondo

== Events ==
Date	event
	Every Child Ministries of Indiana, USA, is established in Zaire
	Mashamba East, an open pit copper mine near Kolwezi, starts operations.

== See also ==
- Zaire
- History of the Democratic Republic of the Congo

== Sources ==
- "Other mines and plants". Katanga Mining. Archived from the original on 2011-12-02.
