= 1969 in the Democratic Republic of the Congo =

- Decades: 1940s; 1950s; 1960s; 1970s; 1980s
- See also: Other events of 1969; History of the DRC

The following lists events that happened during 1969 in the Democratic Republic of the Congo.

== Incumbents ==
- President: Mobutu Sese Seko

== Events ==
=== General ===
- Minière des Grands Lacs Africains (MGL) is merged with Kivumines, Phibraki and Cobelmin, based in Kamituga.

== Sources ==
- Kyanga Wasso, Athanase (3 May 2013), SOMINKI en liquidation (PDF) (in French), Bukavu, archived from the original (PDF) on 10 April 2021
