= 1974 in Zaire =

- Decades: 1970s; 1980s; 1990s
- See also: History of Zaire

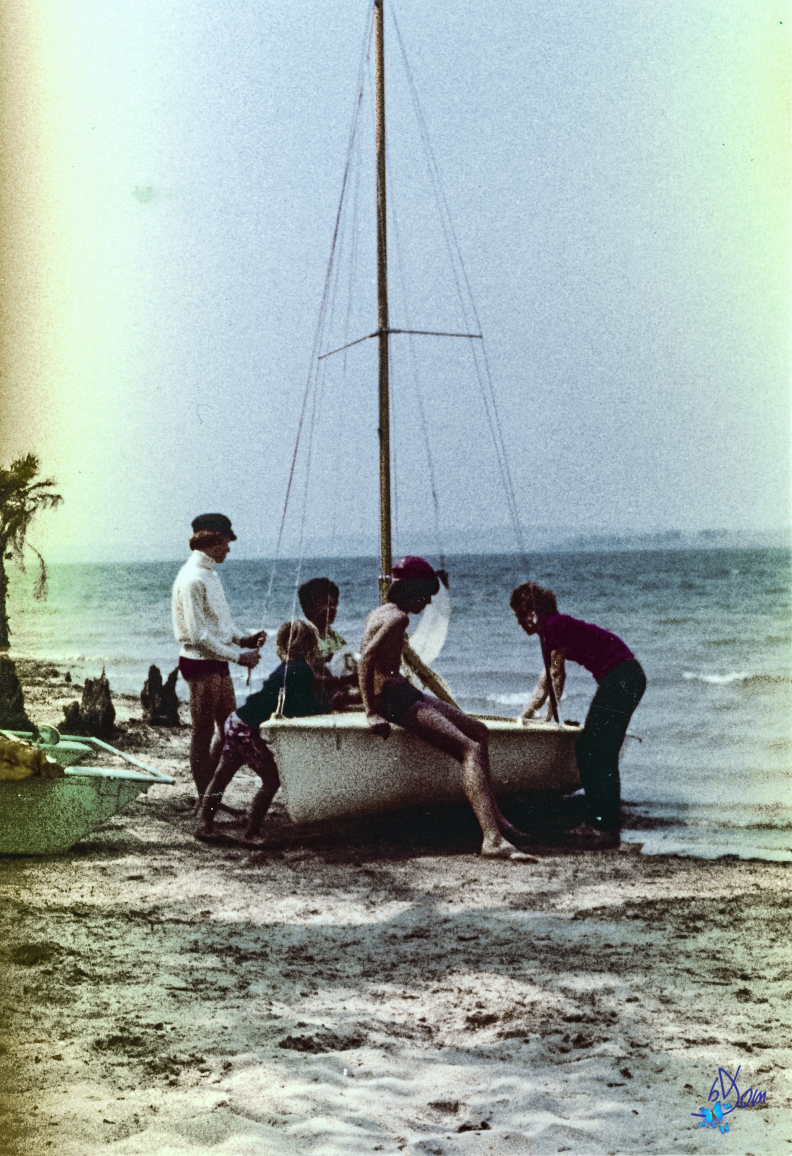
Zaire 1974

The following lists events that happened during 1974 in Zaire.

== Incumbents ==
- President: Mobutu Sese Seko

== Events ==
Date	Event
	The Kamanyola Division is formed, an infantry division of the Forces Armées Zaïroises trained by North Korea.
	The Gangala-na-Bodio Elephant Domestication Center is established in an attempt to domesticate African elephants for work
31 May	Société Minière et Industrielle du Kivu is formed to take over all the gold and tin mines in South Kivu.
13–22 June	Zaire places fourth in the 1974 FIFA World Cup Group 2 competition.
1 July	The Société Nationale des Chemins de Fer Zaïrois (SNCZ) is formed by merging five existing railway companies: Chemins de Fer Kinshasa-Dilolo-Lubumbashi, Chemins de Fer des Grands Lacs, Chemins de Fer Vicinaux du Zaïre (formerly Chemins de Fer Vicinaux du Congo), Chemin de Fer Matadi-Kinshasa and Chemin de Fer de Mayombe.
15 August	The Constitution of Zaire codifies Zaire as a one-party state with the Popular Movement of the Revolution as the only legally permitted party and enshrines Mobutism as the state ideology.
22–24 September	Zaire 74 is a three-day live music festival at the 20th of May Stadium in Kinshasa.
30 October	World heavyweight champion George Foreman fights challenger Muhammad Ali in Kinshasa in "The Rumble in the Jungle".

== See also ==
- Zaire
- History of the Democratic Republic of the Congo

== Sources ==
- "Music Fete in Zaire Has Poor Box Office But Makes a Big Hit", New York Times, 25 September 1974
- N'Lemvo Dedengity, Alain Riche (2008), "Historique de la S.N.C.C.", La problématique de l'audit interne dans la gestion des entreprises publiques en République Démocratique du Congo: Cas de « LA SOCIETE NATIONALE DE CHEMINS DE FER DU CONGO (thesis), Institut supérieur du commerce
- "TIN: Republic of the Zaire", Mineral Trade Notes, vol. 71–8, U.S. Department of the Interior, Bureau of Mines, 1974
- U.S. Dept of Commerce (1974), Trading with the U.S.S.R., U.S. Department of Commerce, Domestic and International Business Administration
- Young, M. Crawford; Turner, Thomas (1985). The Rise & Decline of the Zairian State. Madison: University of Wisconsin Press. ISBN 978-0-299-10113-8.
