= 1971 in the Democratic Republic of the Congo and Zaire =

- Decades: 1950s; 1960s; 1970s; 1980s; 1990s
- See also: Other events of 1971; History of the DRC

- Decades: 1970s; 1980s; 1990s
- See also: History of Zaire

The following lists events that happened during 1971 in the Democratic Republic of the Congo and Zaire.

== Incumbents ==
- The Democratic Republic of the Congo changed name to Zaire on 27 October 1971.
- President – Joseph-Désiré Mobutu, President of Zaire (1965–1994)

== Events ==
Date	Event
	Democratic Republic of the Congo opens its embassy in Brasília, Brazil.
June	Zairian Armed Forces (FAZ) conduct reprisals after rebels led by Laurent-Désiré Kabila are active in South Kivu.
4 June	Joseph Kabila, future president of the DRC, is born in Fizi Territory, South Kivu province.
27 October	The Democratic Republic of the Congo is renamed Zaire.
	La Zaïroise becomes the national anthem.
	Joseph Mobutu takes the name Mobutu Sese Seko. Katanga is renamed Shaba. The Congo River is renamed the Zaire River.

== See also ==
- History of the Democratic Republic of the Congo
- Zaire

== Sources ==
- Democratic Republic of the Congo, Brasil Ministério das Relações Exteriores
- Lanotte Olivier (6 April 2010), Chronology of the Democratic Republic of Congo/Zaire (1960-1997), SciencesPo
- "Democratic Republic of Congo profile - Timeline", BBC News, 10 January 2019
