= 1983 in Zaire =

- Decades: 1970s; 1980s; 1990s
- See also: History of Zaire

The following lists events that happened during 1983 in Zaire.

== Incumbents ==
- President: Mobutu Sese Seko
- Prime Minister: Léon Kengo wa Dondo

== Events ==
Date	Event
4 August	President Ronald Reagan of the United States meets President Mobutu Sese Seko in the Oval Office.

== See also ==
- Zaire
- History of the Democratic Republic of the Congo

== Sources ==
- President Reagan Meeting with President Mobuto from Zaire on August 4, 1983, Reagan Library – via Youtube
