= 1984 in Zaire =

- Decades: 1970s; 1980s; 1990s
- See also: History of Zaire

The following lists events that happened during 1984 in Zaire.

== Incumbents ==
- President: Mobutu Sese Seko
- Prime Minister: Léon Kengo wa Dondo

== Events ==
Date	event
	The Civil Guard is established with responsibility for border security, the fight against illegal traffic and terrorism, and the restoration of public order.
29 July 1984	Mobutu Sese Seko is the only candidate in the 1984 Zairean presidential election. 99.16% support his candidacy.

== See also ==
- Zaire
- History of the Democratic Republic of the Congo

== Sources ==
- Kisangani, Emizet François; Bobb, F. Scott (2010), Historical Dictionary of the Democratic Republic of the Congo, Historical Dictionaries of Africa, vol. 112, The Scarecrow Press, ISBN 978-0-8108-5761-2
