= 1966 in the Democratic Republic of the Congo =

- Decades: 1940s; 1950s; 1960s; 1970s; 1980s
- See also: Other events of 1966; History of the DRC

The following lists events that happened during 1966 in the Democratic Republic of the Congo.

== Incumbents ==
- President – Mobutu Sese Seko
- Prime Minister: Léonard Mulamba

== Events ==
Date	Event
(over the whole year)	Géomines produces 2,818 tonnes of cassiterite.
25 April	Cuvette Centrale, Ubangi, and Moyen-Congo are reunited as Équateur Province.
30 May	Archdiocese of Léopoldville renamed the Archdiocese of Kinshasa
26 October	Post of prime minister is abolished
28 December	Kivu Province is recreated from the provinces of Maniema, North Kivu and South Kivu.
28 December	Orientale Province is formally reconstituted from the amalgamation of Kibali-Ituri, Uélé and Haut-Congo provinces.

== Births ==
- 25 June – Dikembe Mutombo, basketball player

== Sources ==
- "Congo (Kinshasa) Provinces", Rulers.org
- Woodmansee, Walter C. (1969), "The Mineral Industry of the Democratic Republic of the Congo (Kinshasa)", Minerals yearbook: Area reports: international 1967 (PDF), vol. IV, Bureau of Mines, pp. 213–218
