= 1973 in Zaire =

- Decades: 1970s; 1980s; 1990s
- See also: History of Zaire

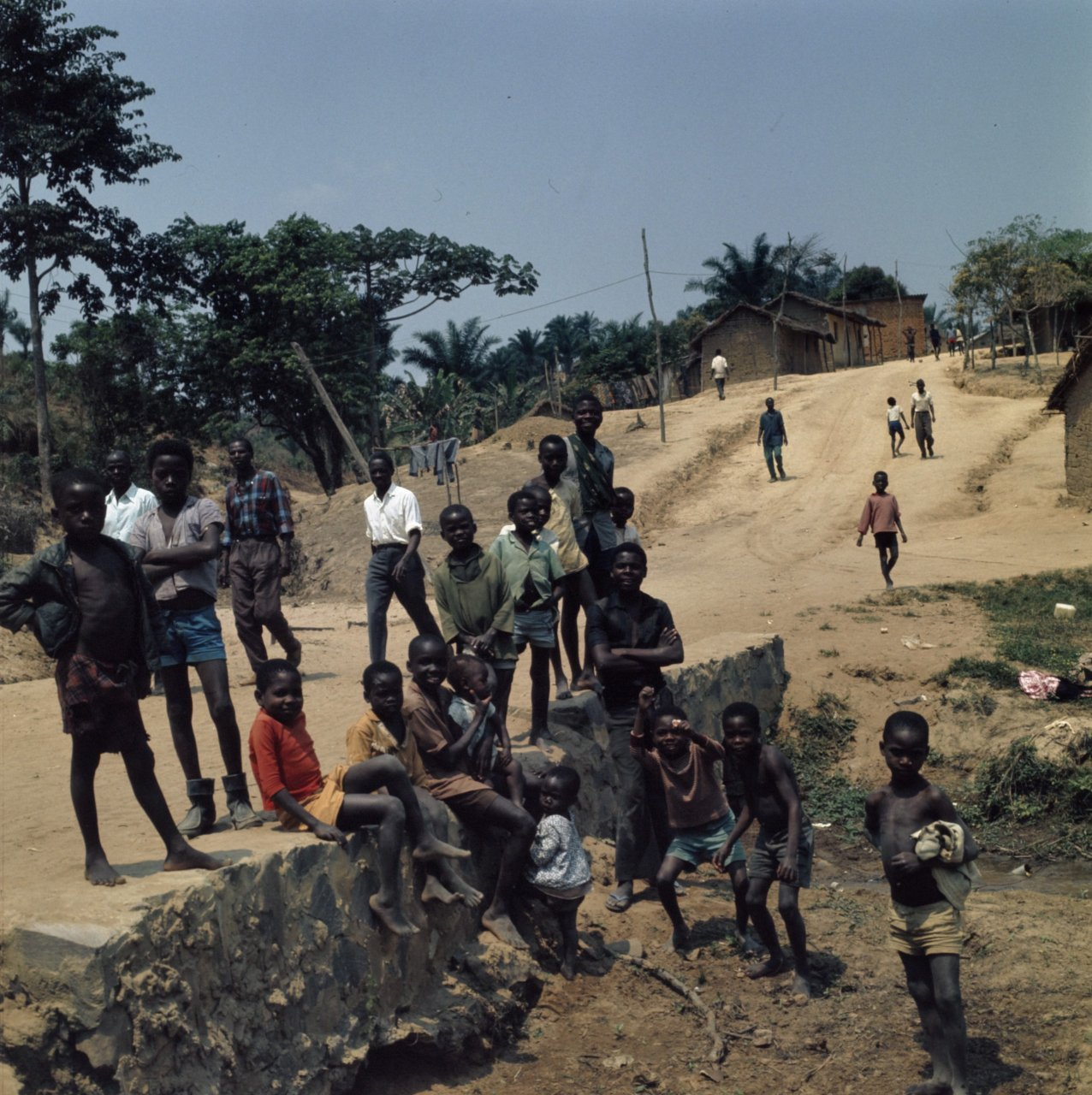
Angolan refugee children in Zaire, 1973.

The following lists events that happened during 1973 in Zaire.

== Incumbents ==
- President: Mobutu Sese Seko

== Events ==
Date	Event
	Late in the year the government decides to transfer all economic activity to citizens of Zaire. “Zairianization” of businesses is part of a broader plan to return to “African authenticity” in culture and to reduce the huge influence of the Catholic Church in health and education.

== See also ==
- Zaire
- History of the Democratic Republic of the Congo

== Sources ==
- Aid and Reform: The case of the Democratic Republic of Congo (PDF), World Bank
