= 1968 in the Democratic Republic of the Congo =

- Decades: 1940s; 1950s; 1960s; 1970s; 1980s
- See also: Other events of 1968; History of the DRC

The following lists events that happened during 1968 in the Democratic Republic of the Congo.

== Incumbents ==
- President – Mobutu Sese Seko

== Events ==
Date	event
	Zairetain acquires Géomines.
	First Soviet ambassador arrives and presents his credentials.
March	Rwanda and Congo-Kinshasa sign an agreement that allows repatriation, by the International Committee of the Red Cross, of the mercenaries who had fought in the recent conflict.
9 August	Jonas Mukamba Kadiata Nzemba (b. 1931) becomes governor of Haut-Zaïre Province.
2 October	Pierre Mulele and Théodore Bengila, who have returned from abroad under an amnesty, are arrested and murdered by ANC officers.

== Sources ==
- "Congo (Kinshasa) Provinces", Rulers.org
- Congo-Kinshasa/Zaire/Democratic Republic of Congo (1960-present), UCA: University of Central Arkansas
- Lanotte Olivier (6 April 2010), CHRONOLOGY OF THE DEMOCRATIC REPUBLIC OF CONGO/ZAIRE (1960-1997)
- Manono, USGS
