= Every Child =

Every Child may refer to:

- EveryChild, a UK-based not-for-profit international children's charity
- Every Child (film), an animated short film for UNICEF
- Every Child Ministries, a US-based Christian charity for African children
- "Every Child", a song by Raffi on his Raffi Radio album
