= 1978 in Zaire =

- Decades: 1970s; 1980s; 1990s
- See also: History of Zaire

The following lists events that happened during 1978 in Zaire.

== Incumbents ==
- President: Mobutu Sese Seko
- Prime Minister: Mpinga Kasenda

== Events ==
Date	event
May	In the Battle of Kolwezi, French and Belgian airborne forces rescue European and Zairian hostages held by Congolese National Liberation Front (FLNC) rebels after they captured the city of Kolwezi.

== See also ==
- Zaire
- History of the Democratic Republic of the Congo
