= 1975 in Zaire =

- Decades: 1970s; 1980s; 1990s
- See also: History of Zaire

The following lists events that happened during 1975 in Zaire.

== Incumbents ==
- President: Mobutu Sese Seko

== Events ==
Date	Event
	Railway line from Bumba to Aketi is opened by the Société Nationale des Chemins de Fer Zaïrois.
	Dikuluwe Mine, a copper and cobalt mine in Katanga Province, is opened.
2 November 1975	The 244 candidates of the Popular Movement of the Revolution are elected by acclaim in the 1975 Zairean parliamentary election.
24 November	A parade is held in Kinshasa to celebrate ten years of rule by President Mobutu Sese Seko.

== See also ==
- Zaire
- History of the Democratic Republic of the Congo

== Sources ==
- Kaufman, Michael T. (25 November 1975), "Zaire Marks Decade Of Rule by Mobutu", New York Times
