= 1965 in the Democratic Republic of the Congo. =

- Decades: 1940s; 1950s; 1960s; 1970s; 1980s
- See also: Other events of 1965; History of the DRC

The following lists events that happened during 1965 in the Republic of Congo.

== Incumbents ==
- President: Joseph Kasa-Vubu – Joseph-Désiré Mobutu
- Prime Minister: Moïse Tshombe – Évariste Kimba – Léonard Mulamba

== Events ==
Date	Event
March 18 - April 30	Moïse Tshombe's Convention Nationale Congolaise wins a large majority in the general election.
18 October	Évariste Kimba, an opponent of Tshombe, is appointed prime minister by president Kasa-Vubu.
24-25 November	Joseph-Désiré Mobutu seizes power in a bloodless coup.
25 November	Léonard Mulamba takes office as prime minister.
