= 1976 in Zaire =

- Decades: 1970s; 1980s; 1990s
- See also: History of Zaire

The following lists events that happened during 1976 in Zaire.

== Incumbents ==
- President: Mobutu Sese Seko

== Events ==
Date	event
	Minière des Grands Lacs Africains (MGL) merges with SYMETAIN to create the Société Minière et Industrielle du Kivu (SOMINKI).

== See also ==
- Zaire
- History of the Democratic Republic of the Congo

== Sources ==
- Kyanga Wasso, Athanase (3 May 2013), SOMINKI en liquidation (PDF) (in French), Bukavu, archived from the original (PDF) on 10 April 2021
