= 1977 in Zaire =

- Decades: 1970s; 1980s; 1990s
- See also: History of Zaire

The following lists events that happened during 1977 in Zaire.

== Incumbents ==
- President: Mobutu Sese Seko
- Prime Minister: Mpinga Kasenda

== Events ==
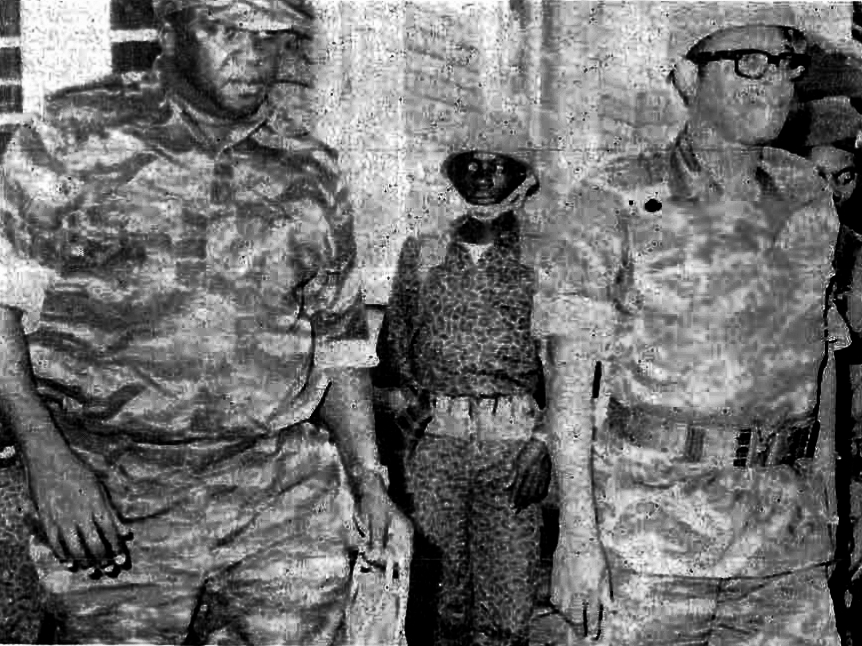
Mobutu meets Idi Amin in April 1977

Date	event
	President Mobutu gets a tepid reception when he invites foreign investors to return to Zaire.
28 May	An attack on Katanga by rebels based in Angola is defeated with the help of French, Belgian and Moroccan troops.
6 July	Mpinga Kasenda is appointed prime minister.
4 August	Jean-Michel Sama Lukonde, future prime minister of the Democratic Republic of the Congo, is born in Paris, France.

== See also ==
- Zaire
- History of the Democratic Republic of the Congo

== Sources ==
- "Democratic Republic of Congo profile - Timeline", BBC News, 10 January 2019
