= National Union of Congolese Workers =

Congolese trade union

UNTC
- National Union of Congolese Workers
- Union Nationale des Travailleurs du Congo
- Founded: June 23, 1967
- Headquarters: Kinshasa, DRC
- Location: Democratic Republic of the Congo
- Affiliations: ITUC, OATUU
- Website: www.untc.org

The National Union of Workers of the Congo (French: Union Nationale des Travailleurs du Congo, UNTC) is the largest trade union centre in the Democratic Republic of the Congo. It was formerly known as the National Union of Workers of Zaire (Union Nationale des Travailleurs du Zaïre, UNTZa).

Founded in 1967, the UNTZa was the sole trade union centre in Zaire. By 1990 the union expelled its general secretary, Komdo Ntonga Booke, a member of the party central committee, and broke away from its close ties with the government. This came after the steady decline of workers purchasing power in the late 1980s.

In 1997, the union was renamed the UNTC, reflecting the renaming of Zaire to the Democratic Republic of the Congo.

== See also ==
- André Bo-Boliko Lokonga (General Secretary, 1967-1980)
