= Democratic Social Christian Party =

Political party in the Democratic Republic of the Congo

- President: André Bo-Boliko Lokonga
- Founder: Joseph Ileo
- Founded: April 1990
- Headquarters: Kinshasa
- Ideology: Christian democracy Federalism; Social market economy
- Political position: Centre
- Seats in the Senate: 1 / 108

The Democratic Social Christian Party (French: Parti Démocrate Social Chrétien; PDSC) is a political party in the Democratic Republic of the Congo.

The PDSC was formed in April 1990 by Joseph Ileo following a speech by Mobutu Sese Seko announcing the end of the single-party rule, taking on a social-democratic platform that emphasised morality and Christian values.

Following the death of Ileo in September 1994, André Bo-Boliko Lokonga assumed presidency of the PDSC, and was approved to the post in September 1995 during the party's national convention.
