= 1967 Democratic Republic of the Congo constitutional referendum =

4-16 June 1967

Results
Choice	Votes	%
Yes	8,220,000	97.80%
No	184,907	2.20%

A constitutional referendum was held in the Democratic Republic of the Congo between 4 and 16 June 1967. The new constitution created a unitary state with a presidential system, whereby the president would be selected by a unicameral National Assembly and then approved by a referendum. It also abolished presidential term limits, limited the number of political parties to two, and gave women the vote.

The proposed constitution was approved by 97.8% of voters.

== Results ==
Choice	Votes	%
For	8,220,000	97.8
Against	184,907	2.2
Invalid/blank votes		-
Total	8,404,907	100
Source: Nohlen et al.
