= 1972 in Zaire =

- Decades: 1970s; 1980s; 1990s
- See also: History of Zaire

The following lists events that happened during 1972 in Zaire.

== Incumbents ==
- President: Mobutu Sese Seko

== Events ==
Date	event
2 January	President Mobutu Sese Seko announced his new campaign, "Authenticité", to remove all traces of the former Belgian Congo's colonial past in favor of "Africanized" names, customs and dress. Having changed his own name from Joseph-Desire Mobutu to Mobutu Sese Seko Kuku Ngbendu wa za Banga, the President required citizens with European-sounding names to change them to something more authentic African names.
22 August	Diocese of Baudouinville renamed as Roman Catholic Diocese of Kalemie–Kirungu

== See also ==
- Mobutism
