= Economic history of the Democratic Republic of the Congo =

Before colonisation, the economy in what is now the Democratic Republic of the Congo (DRC) was mainly characterised by cultivation, hunting, fishing, and gathering.

During the colonial period, when the DRC was occupied by Belgium, products for export and cheap labour were prioritised over food production.

After gaining independence in 1960, the ensuing political turmoil resulted in severe economic dislocations. The DRC's enormous wealth in various minerals aided in the relief of the economy.

Today, poor infrastructure and corruption in the government results in stunted economic growth. Currency depreciation is also an issue.

== Early economic activity ==
In the precolonial era, economic activity in most communities in what is now the Democratic Republic of the Congo was largely subsistence in nature, characterized by a varying combination of shifting cultivation, hunting, fishing, and gathering. The agricultural technology of most groups was comparatively simple. Livestock was limited to chickens and the occasional goat or sheep. In most communities — particularly those in and on the fringes of the forest — the men valued hunting far above agriculture and devoted to it not only time but much ritual activity. This pattern was consistent with the division of labour: at best, men played a small part in cultivating, usually cutting and burning forests or bushes before planting. The high social status of hunting persisted even where the declining availability of games made it economically less critical..

Along the Congo River and its many tributaries, thriving river economies developed. The men of some groups devoted themselves wholly to fishing and the women to pottery, and they exchanged these items for food and other goods produced by their neighbors. These fishermen were also active traders along the navigable waters.

Other groups devoted themselves entirely to hunting and gathering. Occasionally these groups lived in villages with settled agricultural communities. More often, they lived in physically separated hamlets but in symbiosis with specific farming communities, exchanging the products of the hunt for bananas and other crops.

Various groups in the precolonial Democratic Republic of the Congo also played a substantial role in trading such commodities as ivory, rubber, copper, and enslaved people. Demand for these goods sustained the caravan trade of Arab and Arab-African traders throughout Central Africa's interior, now the Democratic Republic of the Congo. Although never great traders themselves, the Lunda profited handsomely from controlling and supervising the caravan trade of others. And both the Kazembe Kingdom and, later, the Luba Empire prospered due to their control of the ivory trade..

== Colonial times ==
After the 1884-85 Conference of Berlin gave sovereignty of the region of the modern Democratic Republic of the Congo to King Leopold II of Belgium, he restructured the area's economy to suit his needs. His stated goal was to make an economically viable and self-sustaining entity out of the Congo Free State.

In 1908 the Belgian parliament voted to remove the region from direct control of the king, make it a colony, and rename it the Belgian Congo. The Belgian government wanted to avoid subsidizing the new colony while reaping its revenues. Therefore, the colony itself was made responsible for financing its own administration and security.

Although considerable exploitation of the country's mineral and agricultural wealth took place during the colonial period, its economic development bore little relationship to the needs of its population. Cash crops for export were prioritized over food production. Monetary benefits accrued almost entirely to non-Congolese, the foreign shareholders of industrial and agricultural companies, and the colonial state, which had holdings in many of the companies.

The colonial government encouraged foreign investment in the Belgian Congo to develop agricultural commodities —- particularly rubber — for export, to exploit the country's mineral resources, and establish a transportation infrastructure to facilitate the export of goods. The colonial state concerned itself very little with such basic social needs as health care or education, which were provided by Christian missions, and to some extent by large concessionaire companies.

State economic objectives emphasized ensuring an adequate supplies of cheap labor, including forced labour. The state also restricted foreign traders, lest they encourage farmers to produce surpluses for sale rather than take low-paying work on plantations and in mines.

Through coercion, colonial authorities obtained the indigenous labor necessary for public works and private investment projects. A decree of 1917, for example, required Africans to devote sixty days a year to agricultural work, and mandated penal sanctions for disobedience.

By offering exceedingly generous terms, the Belgian government induced major foreign financial groups to invest in its colony. The colonial state itself laid claim to a significant share in the ownership of corporations in the extractive and transportation sectors. In 1906 the Société Générale de Belgique (SGB), (General Holding Company of Belgium) a powerful Belgian trust, formed the Union Minière du Haut-Katanga (UMHK), (Upper Katanga Mining Union) the International Forest and Mining Company (Societe Internationale Forestiere et Miniere — Forminiere), and the Compagnie du Chemin de Fer du Bas-Congo au Katanga (BCK), (Bas-Congo to Katanga Railroad Company). A majority shareholder in the UMHK and Forminère, the colonial state could potentially have run both companies. State capitalism did not extend to active involvement in company affairs, however; the colonial administration merely collected its dividends.

SGB was given mineral rights to already-prospected ore deposits in Katanga Province (now Shaba Region) and a 99-year monopoly on any mineral deposits it could identify within a six-year period on a tract of 140 million hectares. BCK was given mineral rights to 2 1 million hectares in the area along the two main rail lines, from Matadi to Léopoldville (now Kinshasa) and from Port Francqui (now Ilebo) to the mining centers in Katanga. It also was permitted to run the railroad with African labor provided by the colonial state. By the 1920s, the rich mineral base was being exploited, and SGB had consolidated its control over the three companies that dominated the colony's economy.

After World War II, government recognition of growing social discontent among the African population led to support for wage increases and to promoting the development of a Congolese middle class. Import-substitution industries were established to meet the growing demand for consumer goods. The colonial administration encouraged corporations and missions to expand social services and to construct hospitals and educational facilities for the Congolese. These reforms, however, were largely unsuccessful; at independence the economy was still primarily export-led, that is, geared toward the export of primary raw materials, and expatriates held most of the managerial and technical positions.

== Independence ==
The political turmoil that followed independence from Belgium in 1960 resulted in the collapse of civil administration and severe economic dislocations. The rapid departure of Belgian administrators and technicians left government and industry in the hands of low-level cadres. Vital transportation facilities and trade services were disrupted. Export earnings declined. After political and civil order were restored following the rise to power of President Mobutu in 1965, the government of the Congo soon launched a comprehensive and ambitious attempt to achieve economic independence through nationalization. The largest expropriation was that of the Belgian-owned mining company, Union Minière du Haut-Katanga (UMHK), and its transformation into Générale des Carrières et des Mines Gécamines), (General Quarries and Mines). After much wrangling with Belgian industrialists and the government, the Democratic Republic of the Congo and Gécamines agreed to a reimbursement plan, which included paying a percentage of its revenues to the former owners.

The government also promoted a series of development programs designed to transform a primarily agrarian economy into a regional industrial power. The Democratic Republic of the Congo's enormous mineral wealth of copper, cobalt, gold, and diamonds was intended to serve as the engine for this transformation. The ultimate goal was ostensibly to move the economy to a stage of development comparable with that of the Western industrial powers. The new Congolese government expected to realize the early colonial aspirations for the country to be the breadbasket and principal industrial power of Africa.

This strategy of industrialization was to be financed through external lending and was based on projections of increases in mineral prices, production, and sales. Justified by the doctrine of economic nationalism, the government undertook grandiose and ill-conceived projects based on copper and energy development, financed on terms unfavorable to the Democratic Republic of the Congo. In 1967 the IMF concluded an agreement with the Congo for monetary and economic reform. The currency was devalued to control inflation, and the Congolese franc was replaced by the zaire. Within two years, the reform program, combined with political tranquility, an increase in the price of copper, and increased exports, led to a stable currency and an increase in foreign reserves. Zaire (as the nation was called from 1971) rode high on the commodity price boom of the early 1970s along with other primary commodity-producing countries.

In retrospect, it appears that the economic and financial policies of this period were the result of a desire both to transform Zaire into an industrial power and to maintain in power and enrich the country's ruling political and economic elite. As several observers have noted, Mobutu's authoritarian paternalism gave rise to rampant corruption incompatible with i and development.

Regardless of the motives for the economic decisions of the late 1960s and early 1970s, economic decline set in as grace periods expired on the enormous debt to foreign governments and international lending agencies that the government had incurred to finance its ambitious industrial development projects, and as the neglect of transport and agriculture began to take its toll.

The cost of living rose rapidly, while new foreign borrowing raised the nation's external debt from US$763 million at the end of 1972 to US$3 billion by 1974. In November 1973, Mobutu announced measures to put all businesses in the hands of Zairians.

== Zairianization ==
Economic nationalism was a common theme throughout post-independence Africa, frequently manifesting itself in the expulsion of foreign merchants and/or expropriation of foreign assets. For Zaire, economic autonomy and political independence were seen as dependent on one other. Zairianization, the expropriation plan announced in November 1973, represented both a combination of the nationalistic impulse for economic independence and personal aggrandizement for President Mobutu, who practiced a form of patrimonialism. Zairianization created a vast pool of goods and money for distribution to loyal family members and to the political class, government and army officials. It was the final and clearest demonstration that political power was the primary means of acquiring wealth. The entrepreneurial risk and initiative to build up the businesses required to develop an infrastructure for economic development were not characteristic of the Zairian elite that came to dominate the country's economy.

On November 30, 1973, before the National Legislative Council, the country's parliament, Mobutu announced his intention to seize and redistribute the nation's foreign businesses. This demonstrated his absolute power over the country. The wisdom, timeliness, or practicality of the nationalization's were not discussed, much less debated. There seems to have been no prior consultation with anyone, including the political elite.

Expropriated property consisted of commercial buildings, light industry, and agricultural holdings, including a vast network of plantations, much it acquired by the president and held in partnership with Belgian interests. Expropriation was managed by various government ministries. Most recipients were ministers, members of the party's political bureau, or top army officers. Smaller properties were allocated to local notables. The term used to describe someone who benefited from the distribution of the spoils was ‘’aquéreur’’, (acquirer).

Zairianization represented a financial windfall for the political elite, who were given the nationalized businesses and brushed aside the economic risks of a takeover. Mobutu's rhetoric promised that Zairianization would promote radical economic nationalism and improve the lot of the country's people. Zairianization would promote rural development by creating a landed gentry, thereby inducing greater investment in the countryside. Thus, the ruling elite cloaked its own enrichment in a mythology of state autonomy and economic sovereignty.

Ultimately, Zairianization resulted in asset stripping, liquidation of inventory, and capital flight. Some businesses were given to more than one individual. Integrated agro-industrial enterprises were broken up. Many new owners had neither the expertise nor the interest to manage and maintain the businesses they had been given. Many were unable to obtain credit and had no business experience. Their first impulse was frequently to dispose of liquid assets as quickly as possible and then abandon the businesses and their assets. Throughout 1974 this lack of interest and expertise led to a devastating dislocation of the commercial infrastructure. The adverse effects were especially evident in small businesses, whose new owners often simply sold the inventory and then left. Shortages of food and consumer goods became widespread.

The final blow to Mobutu's development strategy was the collapse in the price of copper in 1974. The price paid for copper in world markets dropped from US$0.64 per kilogram to US$0.24 per kilogram between 1974 and 1975. Zaire's trade balance deteriorated further when its bill for imported oil reached US$200 million, or 20 percent of its foreign-exchange earnings. The continued sharp fall in commodity prices brought down export receipts and government revenues with a crash and produced a decline in the overall standard of living.

After only twelve months, Zairianization was acknowledged to be a failure, and enterprises that had been given to Zairians were nationalized. The economy continued to slide, however, and in December 1974, under a plan called retrocession, former owners were invited to return to Zaire and reclaim some of their businesses. In practice, the requirement that Zairians retain a sizable stake in these businesses was largely ignored for those expatriates who did return.

== Economic decline ==
By early 1976, Zaire was in a grave economic and financial crisis and faced international bankruptcy. Mobutu and the unproductive political elite sought debt relief from the eleven members of the Paris Club, the World Bank, and the IMF, as arrears mounted rapidly. However, the changes and reforms required by the World Bank, the IMF, and other Western donors threatened the very basis of the elite's power — access to and free use of the nation's resources. The reforms his foreign partners demanded would undermine the heart of his authority: complete personal discretion and the financial privileges and corruption that bound the system together. So Mobutu and the political elite used their control of government institutions to sabotage economic change, by manipulating their donors' economic interests against one another and by exploiting foreign anxieties about the instability that might result from a collapse of the regime.

Members of the Paris Club fitfully coordinated efforts to persuade Zaire to service its debts, control its expenditures, diminish corruption, and implement hard economic decisions. They attempted to draw up joint plans of action, but sometimes worked at cross purposes, as their national interests did not always coincide. Lack of coordination between donors and multilateral institutions was a problem. Foreign contractors were often not entirely supportive of reform, since they benefited from economic chaos and the resulting opportunities for personal enrichment. Pressure for reform from the West varied as governments there changed hands. Mobutu took skillful advantage of these differences and lapses in attention; the inability of Western governments to sustain effective coordination presented Mobutu and those close to him with opportunities to deflect the pressure to reform.

Between 1975 and 1983, Zaire experienced a relentless economic decline. Significant economic and financial imbalances including high inflation and a decline in per capita income gripped the country and turned Zaire into a beggar in the international marketplace. The nationalization measures of 1974, while short-lived, destroyed commercial distribution networks and undermined private-sector confidence.

From 1975 to 1978, the gross domestic product (GDP) dropped 3.5 percent a year. Annual inflation rates averaged 75 percent. In 1980 and 1981, the price of copper recovered briefly but then dropped again in 1982.

Before 1975, Zaire had shipped almost half of its Shaba Region copper exports to the Angolan Atlantic seaport of Lobito via the Benguela railway. The shutdown of this rail line in 1975 because of the Angolan Civil War forced Zaire to export a large share of its mineral exports by the more costly and politically embarrassing South African route.

Excessive government regulation of the economy was also in place from the early 1970s to the early 1980s. The central government imposed price controls on food, fuel and other items, regulated interest rates, and overvalued the zaire. Despite chronic deficit spending, infrastructure deteriorated further into dilapidation.

In the early 1980s, the IMF appointed Erwin Blumenthal, of the central bank of the Federal Republic of Germany, to monitor and advise Zaire's central bank, the Bank of Zaire. Blumenthal cut off credit and foreign-exchange facilities to businesses owned by key members of the political elite, which led to conflict with President Mobutu. Blumenthal's efforts to impose budgetary control over the president and others were delayed and circumvented.

The Zairian political elite thus blocked efforts by international lenders to control the country's financial practices. The IMF supported Zaire with four stabilization programs between 1976 and 1983, and there were as many Paris Club reschedulings and currency devaluations. These efforts were aimed at cutting corruption, rationalizing expenditures, increasing tax revenues, limiting imports, boosting production in all sectors, improving the transportation infrastructure, eliminating debt-service arrears, making principal payments on schedule, and improving economic planning and financial management. But the custom for Zaire quickly became to draw the first payment and then to drift away from the economic reform performance criteria. The 1981 program of special drawing rights (SDRs) 912 million was blocked in September of that year after disbursement of only SDR 1 75 million because of Zaire's failure to meet performance criteria, mainly limits on the budget deficit. The fate of other programs during this period was similar. In 1983, however, Zaire agreed to another economic reform plan.

== 1983 reforms ==
Devaluation of the currency was the centerpiece of the 1983 reform. An initial 80 percent devaluation and subsequent adjustments in the value of the currency substantially reduced black market activity, which had mushroomed when the currency was overvalued at the official rate. The central bank and commercial banks began to meet weekly to fix a rate for the zaire on the basis of recent transactions among themselves. The supply of foreign exchange at the official rate increased markedly, and traders were readily able to purchase foreign exchange from commercial banks to import of most necessities. Nonetheless, restrictive monetary and fiscal policies made it difficult for many firms to muster the deposit in local currency that the commercial banks required to open a letter of credit.

The government's 1983 attempts at economic liberalization were the first serious reform efforts since the economic crisis began in 1974. The government reduced its role in the decision making of state-owned enterprises and in the economy as a whole. Most prices were decontrolled except for petroleum products, public utilities, and transportation. Deficit and government expenditure reduction efforts were undertaken. The trade regime was liberalized, customs duties (a significant source of government income) revised, and external debt payments regularized.

Results were positive, and exporting enterprises were more free from government intervention than at any time since the seizure of UMHK in 1967. Where government chose to maintain its ownership of a company for strategic reasons, important decisions on production, investment, and marketing were increasingly taken by the company rather than by the government itself. Interest rates were deregulated, and controls on producer and retail prices were largely dismantled, though firms remained subject to a subsequent review by Zairian authorities to ensure compliance with legal profit margin limits.

In late 1983, after Zaire had undergone a year of fiscal discipline, the IMF approved a support plan of SDR1 14.5 million and an additional fifteen-month standby loan amount of SDR228 million, both repayable over five years. This plan was accompanied by Paris Club multilateral debt rescheduling, the fifth rescheduling of Zaire's external debt in a period of eight years. Under the agreement, loans totaling US$1.2 billion for 1983-84 were rescheduled. These actions ensured a marginally positive net transfer of resources to Zaire between 1983 and 1986. Although immediately after the devaluation inflation doubled, debt arrears continued to build, and GDP rose by only 1.3 percent, by 1984 inflation had dropped to 52 percent and GDP grew by 1.3 percent.

The 1983 reforms began to unravel in 1986. Export earnings in 1986 fell far below expectations because of extremely low copper and cobalt prices. The government raised civil servant salaries despite stagnant budget receipts. Over half of the budget was paid to foreign and domestic creditors. Frustrated by the slow pace of recovery, the government reestablished some controls and discontinued some reforms. Deficit spending rose dramatically, inflation accelerated, and the zaire began a rapid depreciation. Gains from the reform effort had been largely eroded by late 1986.

Much of the opposition to the reform plan was voiced by members of the political elite and organs of the sole legal political party, the Popular Revolutionary Movement (Mouvement Populaire de la Revolution — MPR). They complained of the "economic imperialism" of the donors. They especially vilified the IMF. Their actual opposition to the 1983 reform may have stemmed less from national pride than from the fact that the previously untouchable political elite was being made to pay taxes and duties and was being denied the economic privileges and access to resources for personal enrichment to which members had grown accustomed. Economic reform and liberalization were incompatible with patrimonial economics because they restrained the government from determining who should profit from the nation's natural wealth and domestic markets.

== 1987 plan ==
In May 1987, Zaire negotiated another economic reform program with the IMF, the World Bank, and its bilateral partners. Along with the usual fiscal and monetary restrictions, Zaire agreed to revise its investment code to streamline the incentive framework and to revamp the tariff structure. Mobutu also backed away from a threat to reinstitute the fixed exchange rate and agreed to sharp increases in fuel prices and taxes. The IMF in turn allowed a 20 percent public-sector wage increase, still less than the 40 percent increase the government had originally sought.

This program, like past efforts, was subsequently supported by Paris Club rescheduling. The IMF agreed to a twelve-month standby credit of SDR116.4 million. The World Bank initiated a US$165-million loan in June 1987 to assist with structural adjustment and the balance of payments. The loan was to support improvements in the management of public enterprises and public administration, agriculture, and transportation, and to provide support for the private sector. Disbursement was to occur in two payments conditioned on meeting performance criteria.

The Paris Club rescheduled US$884 million due between May 1987 and May 1988 over fifteen years with six years' grace. Monthly debt payments were expected to drop from US$15 million to US$7 million. This agreement was exceptional, because the Paris Club usually set ten-year ceilings on repayment delays. Private lenders agreed to lower repayments from US$3.5 million a month to US$3 million. A Belgian bank provided a bridge loan of SDR 100 million to clear Zaire's arrears to the IMF.

Soon after the 1987 program was under way, excessive deficit spending prevented Zaire from meeting the program's targets, and further credit was withheld by both the World Bank and the IMF. Continued excessive government spending through 1988 led to a decline in foreign reserves, and the black market again became active. In 1988 the zaire depreciated dramatically against both the United States dollar and the Belgian franc. The budget deficit went from 3 percent of gross national product (GNP) in 1986 to 12 percent in 1988. The growth in GDP from 1987 to 1989 averaged 2.5 percent a year, well below population growth, resulting in a decline in per capita income.

== 1989 reform ==
In January 1989, the government once more took steps to establish economic stability. A structural adjustment program, including the commitment to contain budget deficits, narrowed the gap between the official and black-market exchange rate to 10 percent by April 1989. In May 1989, a letter of intent was signed with the IMF for a standby loan of SDR115 million, SDR90 million of which came from the structural adjustment facility approved in May 1987 but blocked after the first drawing. A net capital outflow was expected in the first year. However, the program foresaw a net inflow of resources from multilateral and bilateral donors and creditors over the life of the agreement. The World Bank released the second drawing of the US$165 million loan for essential imports, which had been approved in June 1987 but blocked pending agreement with the IMF. Important loans for the transportation and mining sectors were sanctioned while proposed energy sector and social adjustment credits were considered. This latest IMF program emphasized, as usual, a reduction in government budget deficits, the restructuring and improvement of public-sector management, further elimination of distortions in trade policies, improvement in the climate for the growth of the private sector, and improvement in the transportation sector.

The significance of this IMF agreement, as with past agreements, was the favorable impact it was expected to have on all the lenders involved. In June 1989, the Paris Club met to reschedule outstanding Zairian debt. Lenders were presented with three options: a twenty-five-year rescheduling; cancellation of 33 percent of service due over the period under consideration and repayment of all maturities with repayment of the balance at market interest rates over fourteen years with six years' grace; or rescheduling of all maturities involved at an interest rate 3.5 percent lower than the prevailing level over fourteen years with eight years' grace.

Despite the country's reform efforts, the pace of economic activity had not accelerated sufficiently in 1989 to boost living standards, which had fallen each year for more than a decade. The standard of living showed no noticeable improvement for the typical Zairian. Major new investment, foreign or domestic, remained elusive. Nonetheless, agricultural production rose in some areas, although Zaire was still importing substantial quantities of food. In addition, some new light industrial production appeared in Kinshasa, the national capital, including manufacturing of plastics, matches, and batteries, and light electronic assembly. Liberalization in the diamond market meant that official diamond exports and receipts rose substantially.

Inefficient and corruptly managed parastatal companies had contributed to Zaire's troubled economic history and were a severe strain on the budget. As part of the 1989 reform, the government announced that it was taking steps to reduce the role of the public sector in the economy and to increase the efficiency of parastatals, and it produced a list of seventeen companies intended for partial or full privatization. The government's broad objective was to raise private investment funds and to make the private sector more responsible for productive activities, with the exception of essential public services such as utilities and other strategic activities. In agriculture, a program of divestiture led to the privatization of several state-owned companies, such as Coton-Zaire and Agrifor, a forestry firm.

The adoption in 1989 of a liberalized pricing policy and the removal of foreign-exchange restrictions eased conditions for importers and entrepreneurs, which in turn led to an increase in the range and availability of a variety of consumer goods in the Kinshasa market. Most of these goods, however, were expensive imported food items, clothing, and other merchandise unaffordable to any but expatriates and the wealthy. Liberalized pricing policies also meant a more adequate supply in a wider market of fuel products.

By the end of 1989, however, it was apparent that these latest reforms had been unsuccessful in promoting sustained economic expansion. Indeed, Zairians experienced a massive drop in per capita income, as inflation rose and the GDP growth rate fell. The inflation rate for 1989 was 104 percent, a significant increase over 83 percent the previous year. GDP growth for 1989 was registered as -1.3 percent.

Economic indicators for 1990 were even more dismal. IMF credit had expired, and large public-expenditure deficits were expected from to pay increases for government workers. The final figures for 1990 showed a decline in the GDP of 2.6 percent, 90 percent inflation in consumer prices, and further devaluation of the zaire against Western currencies.

By 1992 and continuing into 1993, most sectors of the economy were in a state of advanced decay. Hyperinflation was a permanent fixture. The country's currency continued to depreciate to new lows against the dollar (Z110 million = US$1 by December 1993), causing a demonetization of the economy and a breakdown of the banking system, as well as severe damage to Zaire's international competitiveness. Poverty and unemployment were widespread.

== 1994 to present ==
Poor infrastructure, an uncertain legal framework, corruption, and lack of openness in government economic policy and financial operations remain a brake on investment and growth. A number of International Monetary Fund (IMF) and World Bank missions have met with the new government to help it develop a coherent economic plan, but associated reforms are on hold.

Faced with continued currency depreciation, the government resorted to more drastic measures and in January 1999 banned the widespread use of American dollars for domestic commercial transactions, a position it later adjusted. The government has been unable to provide foreign exchange for economic transactions, while it has resorted to printing money to finance its expenditures. Growth was negative in 2000 because of the difficulty of meeting the conditions of international donors, continued low prices of key exports, and post-coup instability. Although depreciated, congolese francs have been stable for few years.

Conditions improved in late 2002 with the withdrawal of many of the invading foreign troops. A number of IMF and World Bank missions have met with the government to help it develop a coherent economic plan, and President Joseph Kabila has begun implementing reforms.

=== Special Economic Zone ===
The DRC is establishing special economic zones (SEZ) to encourage the revival of its industry. The first SEZ was to come into being in 2012 in N'Sele, a commune of Kinshasa, and will focus on agro-industries. The Congolese authorities also planned to open another zone dedicated to mining in Katanga and a third dedicated to cement in the Bas-Congo. There are three phases to the program that each have their own objectives. Phase I was the precursor to the actual investment in the Special Economic Zone where policymakers agreed to the framework, the framework was studied for its establishment, and to predict the potential market demand for the land. Stage one of Phase II involved submitting laws for the Special Economic Zone, finding good sites for businesses, and currently there is an effort to help the government attract foreign investment. Stage two of Phase II hasn't been started yet and it involves assisting the government in creating framework for the country, creating an overall plan for the site, figuring out what the environmental impact of the project will be, and guessing how much it will cost and what the return can be made on the investment. Phase III involves the World Bank creating a transaction phase that will keep everything competitive. The program is looking for options to hand over the program to the World Bank which could be very beneficial for the western part of the country.
