= N'Singa Udjuu =

Congolese politician (1934–2021)

First State Commissioner of Zaire
- In office 23 April 1981 – 5 November 1982
- President: Mobuto Sese Seko
- Preceded by: Jean Nguza Karl-i-Bond
- Succeeded by: Léon Kengo wa Dondo

Personal details
- Born: Joseph N'Singa; 29 September 1934 Banningville, Belgian Congo
- Died: 24 February 2021 (aged 86)

Joseph N'Singa Udjuu Ongwabeki Untubwe (29 September 1934 – 24 February 2021) was a Congolese politician. He served as the First State Commissioner of Zaire from 23 April 1981 to 5 November 1982. From 1966 to 1969, he also served as Minister of Justice.
