= Every Child Ministries =

Christian charity

- Founded: 1985
- Founder: John & Lorella Rouster
- Type: Evangelical Missions Agency
- Purpose: African children, especially those neglected or marginalized by society
- Location: U.S.
- Region served: 3 African countries
- Key people: Mark Luckey, International Executive Director; John and Lorella Rouster, Founders & former International Directors 1996-2014; Pasteur Mupepe Sylvain, DR Congo Director; Richard Koudaya, Ghana Director; Brian Mukalazi, Uganda Director; Stephen Green, Chair, International Board
- Website: ECMAfrica.org

Every Child Ministries is a Christian charity and mission agency that works on behalf of African children. It notably advocates for neglected and marginalized African children. It was first incorporated in Indiana (U.S.) in 1985 and is now recognized as an NGO in the three African countries where it operates.

== Programs ==
Every Child Ministries implements multiple programs across DR Congo, Ghana, and Uganda. These include initiatives for street children, vocational apprenticeships, and residential care through the Haven of Hope Children’s Home and Academy in Ghana. The organization also provides educational support via child sponsorship, special assistance for children with albinism, and teacher training programs—including a nine-month “teachers of teachers” course at the African Leadership Training Center in DR Congo. Additional services include resource libraries, health services, rescue operations for at-risk children, Kids’ Clubs, Sunday Schools, family sponsorship, agricultural education under the 'Farming God's Way' initiative, and support for children with disabilities.

== History ==
Every Child Ministries (ECM, also known as ECMAfrica) was founded in 1985 by John and Lorella Rouster following a three-year missionary assignment in what was then Zaire. John had an agricultural background and later earned a Biblical studies certificate from Moody Bible Institute. Lorella was a teacher, Christian educator, and journalist, and an alumna of Moody Bible Institute, Tri-State University(B.A.), and Covington Theological Seminary (M.R.E.) The Rousters served approximately nine years in Zaire—just over three years prior to founding ECM (1981–spring 1984), and six years with ECM (1990–1996). During this time Lorella wrote numerous books in the African Kituba language, translated songs, Gospel and health booklets, which were published by ECM. She also developed an extensive training manual for teachers of children. This book was later published in seven languages spoken in Africa: Kituba, Lingala, Tshiluba, French, English, Spanish, Portuguese.

From 1985 to 1998, Every Child Ministries served only in DR Congo and was mainly limited to Christian education, training of teachers, development of literature, and health services. In 1985 ECM was featured in the "Mission Explorers Video Series" with Carey Kinsolving. These ministries have continued and expanded under national leadership.

In 1990 ECM established Mission Garizim in Congo and opened its African Leadership Training Center in 2001, training "teachers of teachers" for Congo and other French-speaking African countries.

In 1997 the Rousters returned from Congo. Floyd Bertsch had served as International Director while the Rousters were in Congo, but upon their return they again took the position of International Director, sharing the duties as co-directors.

In 1999 an evaluatory trip was made to Ghana. As a result, several initiatives were established there including the Initiative against shrine slavery ritual servitude and the Initiative for Street children.

Since 1999 three tendencies have been noticeable: 1. Expansion into other African countries, and 2. A growing tendency to focus on the needs of what the organization deems as the most marginalized and neglected children, 3. A growing emphasis on Child sponsorship.

In 2001 ECM initiated a program called "Character Building from the Bible" in some of the public schools of Ghana, which continued for several years.

In November 2002 Haven of Hope children's home was founded. About 30 children currently find a safe haven there. Many were homeless street children, some are orphans, abandoned children, former shrine slaves and children of former slaves. The home now includes a school, Haven of Hope Academy, offering Nursery through Class 6.

In January 2003 Every Child Ministries held its first liberation of shrine slaves known as trokosi, cooperating with International Needs Ghana. This was followed by another liberation in January 2004 in cooperation with FESLIM (Fetish Slaves Liberation Movement), a third in December 2005, and another in March 2010. ECM was very active in advocating for the abolition of the practice and the liberation of existing slaves. In 2007 they released a DVD for their anti-slavery project called "Stomp Out Slavery" to help raise public awareness. In January 2008, ECM issued a "Prayer Guide against Modern Slavery" in celebration of the 150th anniversary of the Emancipation Proclamation. Ministry for ECM in this area has concluded and focus has shifted to evangelism to/discipleship of the liberated women and their children.

In 2003 ECM expanded its ministry to street children to include DR Congo, ministering to children living on Kinshasa's streets with meals twice a week, vocational training, literacy classes, sports teams, gardening and Bible classes.

The same year they introduced an in-depth method of teaching the Bible. Called "Step by Step, Slowly", the approach teaches Bible passages phrase by phrase involving a four-step process—Read, Question, Act it out, Sing and Dance.

In 2006 ECM made investigatory trips into Togo, Benin, Uganda, and New Sudan, and conducted training for children's teachers in Uganda and New Sudan.

This was followed by training for children's teachers in Togo in 2007 and in Benin in 2008, and by the establishment of a main base of operations with numerous projects in Uganda in 2007–2008.

Initial projects in Uganda included summer day camps and holiday parties for children in IDP camps, an initiative to help children with albinism and improve public acceptance of them, and the missionary project "The Way Home" targeting AIDS orphans. "The Way Home" project began in 2010 with assistance to "grannies" raising several grandchildren who were orphaned due to AIDS. Many projects have since been started around the country, including Tororo, Napak, Lwengo, and various sections of Kampala, most focused on child sponsorship.

On January 1, 2015, Mark Luckey was named as International Executive Director, succeeding the Rousters, who continued serving in positions as missionary consultants, project advisors, and communications specialists. John retired from missionary service on October 1, 2016, though he continues to volunteer at the ECM home office. Lorella remains active, writing and producing Sunday School materials in DR Congo languages, which are delivered to DR Congo annually by either Mark Luckey or Lorella Rouster.

== Missiology ==
Every Child Ministries is a nonsectarian Christian mission of evangelical persuasion, drawing support from individuals across diverse Christian denominations. The mission emphasizes hands-on, volunteer-driven work and supports both career and short-term missionaries and widely supports the work of African nationals.

== Memberships and affiliations ==
Every Child Ministries has been a member of the Evangelical Council for Financial Accountability since 1987, and is also accredited by the Better Business Bureau Wise Giving Alliance. The organization partners with Mission Network News and participates in STEER—a network of agriculturalists supporting mission work—as well as the Christian Leadership Alliance and Missio Nexus. ECM participates in the Guidestar transparency program, with a current gold seal rating, and has earned the Great Non Profits badge for several years due to positive reviews. ECM has participated in the triennial Urbana (convention) Student Missions Conference, where Co-Director Lorella Rouster taught a 2006 seminar on “Healing the Children of War.”, and the Moody Bible Institute annual Mission's Conference. The organization has also regularly participated in the Greater Chicago Sunday School Association, where they have presented many workshops for teachers. In 2005 they were the featured international ministry at the Children's Pastor's Conferences sponsored by the International Network of Children's Ministry.
