= André Bo-Boliko Lokonga =

Congolese politician (1934–2018)

Bo-Boliko Lokonga
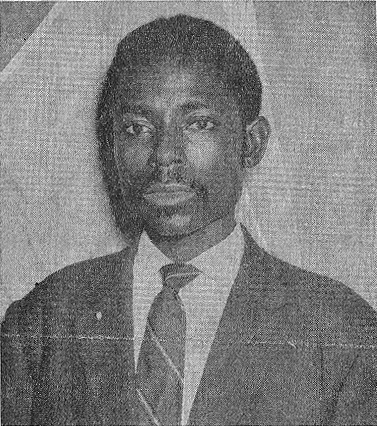
- Bo-Boliko in 1960

First State Commissioner of Zaire
- In office 6 March 1979 – 27 August 1980
- President: Mobuto Sese Seko
- Preceded by: Mpinga Kasenda
- Succeeded by: Jean Nguza Karl-i-Bond

Personal details
- Born: André Bo-Boliko; 15 August 1934 Lobamiti, Bandundu Province, Belgian Congo
- Died: 30 March 2018 (aged 83) Brussels, Belgium

André Bo-Boliko Lokonga Monse Mihambo (15 August 1934 – 30 March 2018) was a Congolese politician. He served as the First State Commissioner of Zaire from 6 March 1979 to 27 August 1980. From 1967 to 1980, he was secretary-general of the National Union of Zairian Workers (Union Nationale des Travailleurs du Zaïre, UNTZa).

== Early life ==
André Bo-Boliko Lokonga was born on 15 August 1934 in Lobamiti, Bandundu Province, Belgian Congo.

== Career ==
He served as President of the Legislative Council of Congo (and later Zaire) from December 1970 until March 1979. In 1990 he joined Joseph Iléo in founding the Democratic Social Christian Party.

== Death ==
He died in Brussels, Belgium on 30 March 2018, at the age of 83.
