= Jean Nguza Karl-i-Bond =

Zairian politician (1938–2003)

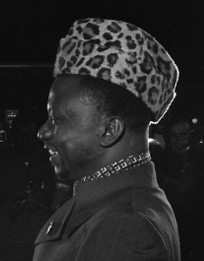
- Nguza in 1976

Prime Minister of the Republic of Zaire
- In office November 25, 1991 – August 15, 1992
- President: Mobutu Sese Seko
- Preceded by: Bernardin Mungul Diaka
- Succeeded by: Étienne Tshisekedi

First State Commissioner of the Republic of Zaire
- In office August 27, 1980 – April 18, 1981
- President: Mobutu Sese Seko
- Preceded by: Bo-Boliko Lokonga
- Succeeded by: N'Singa Udjuu

Personal details
- Born: August 4, 1938 Musumba, Lualaba Province, Belgian Congo
- Died: July 27, 2003 (aged 64) Kinshasa, Democratic Republic of the Congo
- Party: MPR (until 1990); UFERI (1990–2003)

Jean Nguza Karl-i-Bond (August 4, 1938 – July 27, 2003) was a prominent Zairian politician.

== Biography ==
=== Early years and career in Zaire ===
Born in Musumba, Lualaba District, a member of the Lunda tribe and a nephew of the Katangan leader, Moise Tshombe, Nguza was a pock-marked child who rose rapidly through government posts and gained the favour of President Mobutu Sese Seko.

Nguza received a master's degree in international relations from the Catholic University of Leuven, Belgium and returned to Zaire to serve as Foreign Minister from 1972 to 1974, and 1976–1977, as well serving as political director of the MPR, the country's only legal political party. Fluent in six African languages as well as English, French, Dutch, and German, Nguza's stature within Zaire and in the international community was such that he was considered a possible successor to Mobutu as President of Zaire.

However, in 1977, he fell out of favor with Mobutu, who accused Nguza of attempting to seduce the first lady while simultaneously plotting high treason, and was imprisoned and sentenced to death. According to Nguza, Mobutu personally threatened to shoot him. Many believe that Nguza's sole crime was having been mentioned in the foreign press (during the Shaba I invasion in 1977) as a possible successor to Mobutu. During his interrogation, Nguza was subjected to torture which included the insertion of a metal tube into his penile shaft, through which jets of air were introduced, causing the blood vessels to rupture, and the application of electrical shocks to his testicles. The torture is said to have left him impotent.

A year later, following international pressure, Nguza received a presidential pardon and was again named Foreign Minister in 1979. He became First State Commissioner of Zaire in 1980.

=== Exile ===
In 1981, while on a private visit to Brussels with his wife, Nguza fled into exile, where he attempted to unite the exiled Zairean opposition and testified against Mobutu in front of U.S. Congress hearings, outlining, in graphic detail, Mobutu's theft of hundreds of millions of dollars from the country's treasury and its subsequent deposit in foreign banks.

Nguza published Mobutu ou l'incarnation du mal zaïrois, which was highly critical of the regime. Even so, Mobutu forgave him, invited him back home, and appointed him as ambassador to Washington in 1986.

After the proclamation of the Third Republic, and the subsequent legalization of opposition parties in 1990, Nguza started his own party, the Union of Federalists and Independent Republicans. He later replaced Étienne Tshisekedi as Prime Minister, after Tshisekedi tried to block Mobutu from accessing cash at the central bank. Nguza was regarded by other members of the Sacred Union (of which his party was a member) as a "traitor" because of this, and he subsequently left the Sacred Union. His party formed a new coalition, the Alliance of Patriotic Forces, which was committed to political reform but rejected "extremist" stances. The relationship between Tshisekedi and Nguza deteriorated considerably, and armed clashes, many taking on ethnic dimensions and resulting in considerable loss of life, broke out between their respective supporters, further contributing to the instability and chaos prevalent in the country.

After Laurent Kabila seized power, Nguza fled into exile in South Africa. He suffered a cardiac arrest in 1995, and was forced to undergo medical care for many years. Nguza returned to Zaire (by then renamed the Democratic Republic of the Congo), where he died at a private clinic in Kinshasa.

== See also ==
- Ferdinand Kazadi

== Sources ==
=== Books ===
- Elliot, Jeffrey M., and Mervyn M. Dymally (eds.). Voices of Zaire: Rhetoric or Reality. Washington Institute Press. ISBN 0-88702-045-3
- Harden, Blaine. Africa: Dispatches from a Fragile Continent. Houghton Mifflin Company. ISBN 0-395-59746-3
- Meredith, Martin. The Fate of Africa: From the Hopes of Freedom to the Heart of Despair, a History of Fifty Years of Independence. Public Affairs. ISBN 1-58648-246-7
- Nguza Karl-i-Bond, Jean. Mobutu ou l'Incarnation du Mal Zairois. Bellew Publishing Co Ltd. ISBN 0-86036-197-7
- Wrong, Michela. In The Footsteps of Mr. Kurtz: Living on the Brink of Disaster in Mobutu's Congo. Perennial. ISBN 0-06-093443-3
- Young, Crawford, and Thomas Turner. The Rise and Decline of the Zairian State. University of Wisconsin Press. ISBN 0-299-10110-X
