= History of the Democratic Republic of the Congo =

The earliest known human settlements in what is now the Democratic Republic of the Congo date back to the Middle Stone Age, approximately 90,000 years ago. The first 'states', such as the Kongo, the Lunda, the Luba and Kuba, appeared south of the equatorial forest on the savannah, from the 14th century. The Kingdom of Kongo controlled much of western and central Africa, including what is now the west of the DR Congo, between the 14th and early 19th centuries. At its peak it had 500,000 people, and its capital was M'banza-Kongo. In the late 15th century, Portuguese sailors arrived in the Kongo, and this led to prosperity and consolidation, with the king's power based on Portuguese trade. King Afonso I (1506–43) had raids carried out on neighboring districts, in response to Portuguese requests for slaves. After his death, the kingdom underwent a crisis.

The Atlantic slave trade occurred from approximately 1500 to 1850, with the west coast of Africa targeted, and the region around the mouth of the Congo River suffered the most intensive enslavement. Along a strip of coast about 400 kilometres (250 mi) long, about 4 million people were enslaved and sent across the Atlantic to sugar plantations in Brazil, the US and Caribbean. From 1780, there was a higher demand for slaves in the US which led to more people being enslaved. By 1780, more than 15,000 people were shipped annually from the Loango Coast. In 1870, Henry Morton Stanley explored what is now the DR Congo. Belgian colonization began in 1879 when King Leopold II sent out agents to establish posts along the Congo River, from its mouth upstream to the north, enabling him to claim sovereignty over what would become the Congo Free State in 1885. Many outposts were built to extend the power of the state over such a vast territory. In 1885, the Force Publique was set up, a colonial army with white officers and black soldiers. In the late 19th century, Christian missionaries arrived intending to convert the population. A railway between Matadi and Stanley Pool was built in the 1890s. Reports of widespread murder, torture, and other abuses in the rubber plantations led to international outrage and the Belgian government transferred control from Leopold II and established the Belgian Congo in 1908.

Following unrest, Belgium granted Congo independence in 1960. However, the Congo remained unstable, leading to the Congo Crisis, where the regional governments of Katanga and South Kasai attempted to gain independence with Belgian support. Prime Minister Patrice Lumumba tried to suppress secession with the aid of the Soviet Union as part of the Cold War, causing the US to support a coup led by Colonel Joseph Mobutu. Lumumba was handed over to the Katangan government and executed in 1961. The secessionist movements were defeated by the Congolese government as were the Soviet-backed Simba rebels. Following the end of the Congo Crisis in 1965, Joseph Kasa-Vubu was deposed and Mobutu seized power and renamed the country Zaire. He sought to Africanize the country, changing his name to Mobutu Sese Seko, and demanded citizens change their Western names to traditional African ones. Mobutu sought to repress any opposition, which he successfully did throughout the 1980s. However, with his regime weakened in the 1990s, Mobutu was forced to agree to a power-sharing government with the opposition party. Mobutu remained the head of state and promised elections within the next two years, that never took place.

During the First Congo War, Rwanda invaded Zaire, and Mobutu lost power. In 1997, Laurent-Désiré Kabila took power and renamed the country: the Democratic Republic of the Congo. The Second Congo War began, resulting in a regional war in which different African nations took part and in which millions were killed or displaced. Laurent was assassinated by his bodyguard in 2001, and his son, Joseph, succeeded and was elected president by the Congolese government in 2006. Joseph sought peace. Foreign soldiers remained for a few years and a power-sharing government between Joseph and the opposition party was set up. Joseph resumed sole control and was re-elected in a disputed election in 2011. In 2018, Félix Tshisekedi was elected president; in the first peaceful transfer of power since independence.

== Early history ==
The area now known as the Democratic Republic of the Congo was populated as early as 90,000 years ago, as shown by the 1988 discovery of the Semliki harpoon at Katanda, one of the oldest barbed harpoons ever found, which is believed to have been used to catch giant river catfish.

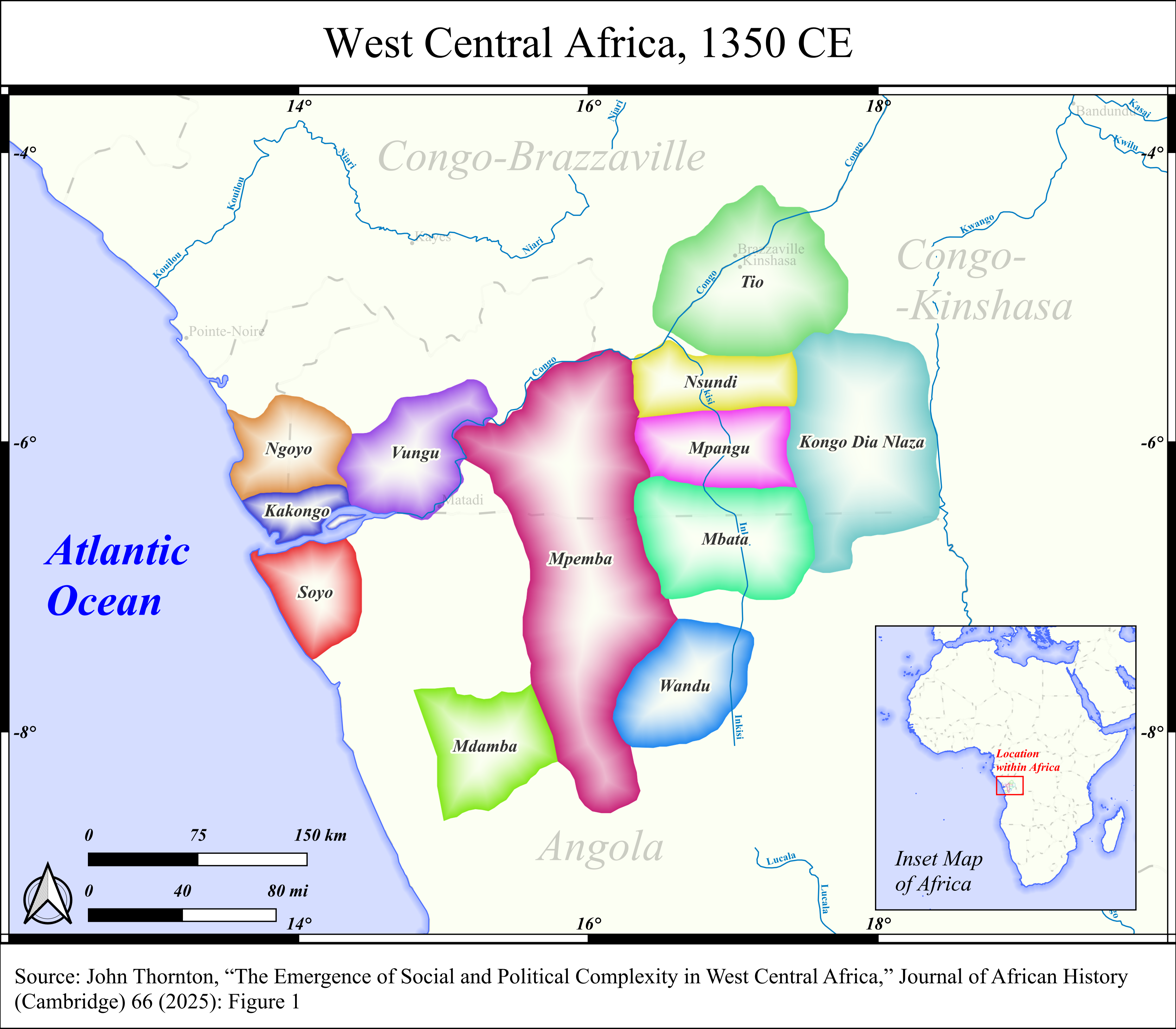
States of the western Congo Basin, c. 1350

Bantu peoples reached Central Africa at some point during the first millennium BC, then gradually started to expand southward. Their propagation was accelerated by the adoption of pastoralism and of Iron Age techniques. The people living in the south and southwest were foraging groups, whose technology involved only minimal use of metal technologies. The development of metal tools during this time period revolutionized agriculture. This led to the displacement of the African pygmies. Following the Bantu migrations, a period of state and class formation began circa 700 with three centres in the modern-day territory; one to the west around Pool Malebo, one east around Lake Mai-Ndombe, and a third even further east and south around the Upemba Depression.

By the 13th century there were three main federations of states in the western Congo Basin. In the east were the Seven Kingdoms of Kongo dia Nlaza, considered to be the oldest and most powerful, which likely included Nsundi, Mbata, Mpangu, and possibly Kundi and Okanga. South of these was Mpemba which stretched from modern-day Angola to the Congo River. It included various kingdoms such as Mpemba Kasi and Vunda. To its west across the Congo River was a confederation of three small states; Vungu (its leader), Kakongo, and Ngoyo.

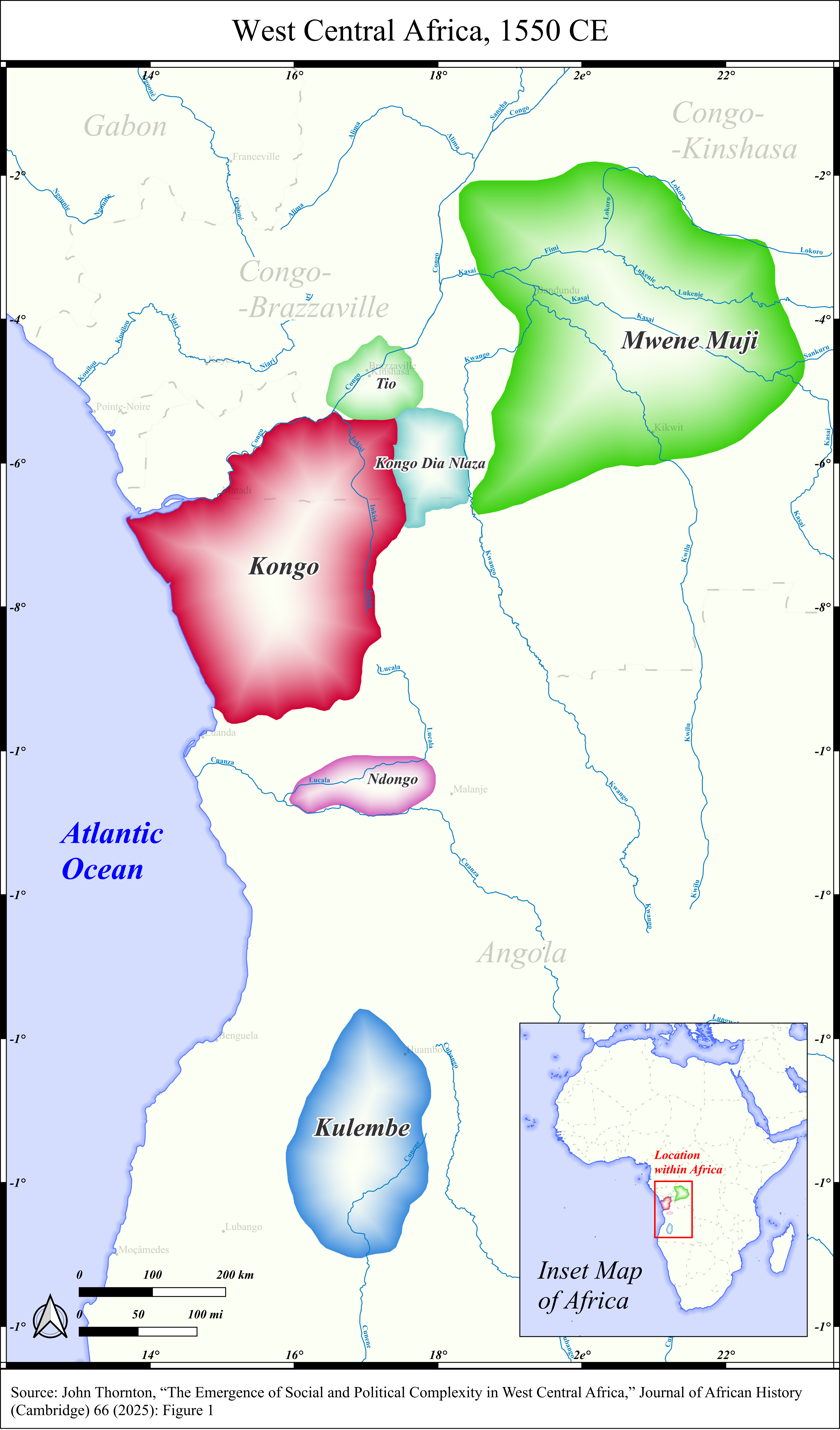
Major states of the western Congo Basin, c. 1550

The Kingdom of Kongo existed from the 14th to the early 19th century. Until the arrival of the Portuguese it was the dominant force in the region along with the Kingdom of Luba, the Kingdom of Lunda, the Mongo people and the Anziku Kingdom.

During the 16th and 17th centuries, British, Dutch, Portuguese, and French merchants participated in the slave trade through intermediaries within the Kingdom of Kongo.

== Colonial rule ==
=== Congo Free State (1877–1908) ===
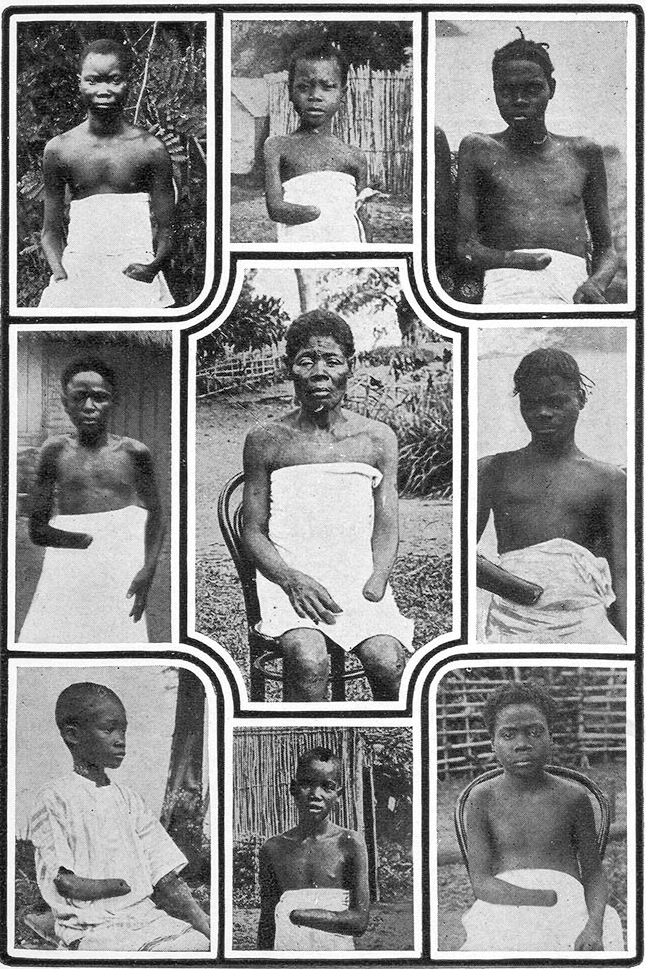
Children mutilated during King Leopold II's rule

Belgian exploration and administration began in 1877 and continued into the 1920s. King Leopold II of Belgium recruited Henry Morton Stanley for the first expedition to Central Africa conducted under Belgian patronage. At the time, the eastern regions of the precolonial Congo were heavily disrupted by constant slave raiding, mainly from Arab–Swahili slave traders such as the infamous Tippu Tip, who Stanley knew well. Leopold pursued ambitions to acquire the Congo as a colony. He acted through the Association internationale africaine (AIA), of which he was the sole shareholder and chairman, and publicly presented his actions as humanitarian, while setting the European powers against one another. At the Berlin Conference of 1885, Leopold formally acquired rights to the Congo territory and named it the Congo Free State. It was not a Belgian colony, but Leopold's private possession, and Belgium’s only link to the territory was that Leopold II was ruler of both states. The state included the entire area of the present Democratic Republic of the Congo.

Colonisation began immediately, with the first phase focused on constructing the Matadi–Kinshasa Railway to connect the navigable section of the Congo River to the coast. This massive undertaking cost many lives and became a key element of the colonial economy by enabling the extraction of resources, such as rubber and ivory, from the interior country. Colonists coerced the local population into producing rubber to meet the growing international demand driven by the spread of automobiles and the development of rubber tires. Rubber profits brought Leopold immense personal wealth, which he used to construct several buildings in Brussels and Ostend intended to glorify himself and his country.

Under the Congo Free State, concessions were granted to private companies, giving them monopolies over resource extraction and coercive authority. The most brutal concession zones were located around rubber plantations, where villages were tied to strict quota systems enforced through local chiefs. Rubber quotas were enforced by the Force Publique, Leopold's private army, and by “village sentries”, militias led by European officers and composed of African soldiers. These forces operated with little oversight and near total impunity. Failure to meet quotas frequently resulted in severe punishment, including physical violence and the kidnapping of family members, who were held for ransom until quotas were met. The Force Publique regularly employed torture, carried out reprisals against the relatives of suspected rebels, and subjected Congolese people to flogging and sexual abuse. It also destroyed villages accused of resistance and, most notoriously, enforced the cutting off of hands, including those of children. The sentries were reportedly known to kill and eat underperforming workers. Leopold himself was reportedly engaged in the trafficking and sexual exploitation of underage girls in Europe.

News of the abuses began to circulate. Under Leopold, the Congo Free State became one of the most infamous international scandals of the turn of the twentieth century. In 1904, the British consul at Boma in the Congo, Roger Casement, was instructed by the British government to investigate. His report confirmed the accusations of humanitarian abuses. It led to the arrest and punishment of white officials who had been responsible for cold-blooded killings during a rubber-collecting expedition in 1900, including a Belgian national who caused the shooting of at least 122 Congolese natives.

Between 1885 and 1908, between 1.2 and 13 million Congolese died as a consequence of exploitation and disease, though the exact number of deaths cannot be determined due to the absence of reliable records, and the lack of a comprehensive census before 1924. In some areas the population declined dramatically – it has been estimated that sleeping sickness and smallpox killed nearly half the population in the areas surrounding the lower Congo River. The Casement report suggested that as many as ten million people may have died, attributing depopulation to indiscriminate violence, starvation, declining birth rates, and tropical diseases.

European and U.S. press agencies exposed the conditions in the Congo Free State to the public in 1900. The Belgian Parliament forced Leopold II to set up an independent commission of inquiry in 1904. Its findings confirmed the Casement report of abuses, concluding that the population of the Congo had been "reduced by half" during this period. By 1908, Leopold II’s rule was regarded as so brutal that it was condemned by European powers, despite their own violent exploitation of Africa. Public and diplomatic pressure forced him to give up the Congo. On 18 October 1908, in spite of initial reluctance, the Belgian parliament voted in favour of annexing the Congo as a Belgian colony.

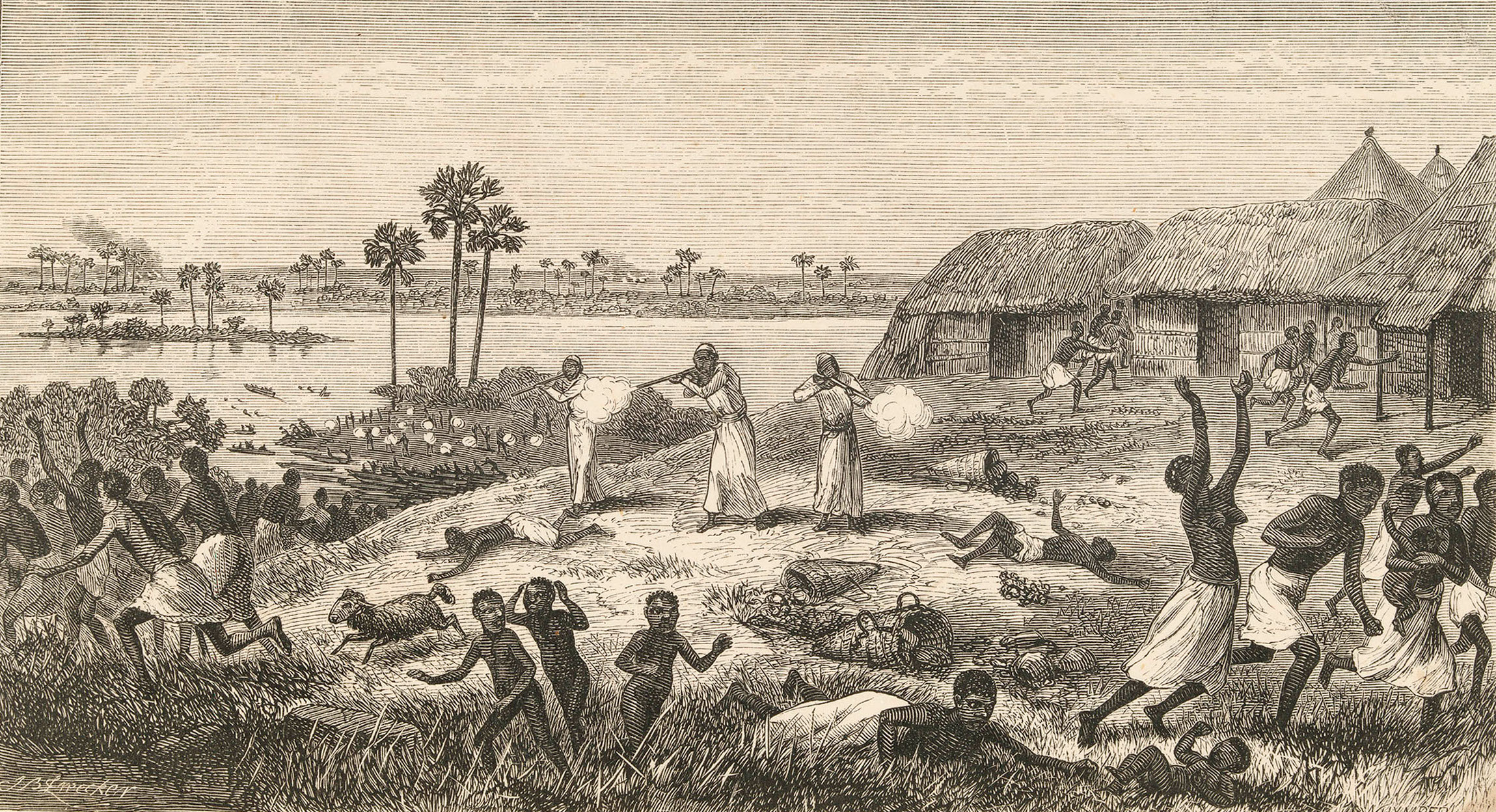
Arab slave raid on Nyangwe, c. 1870

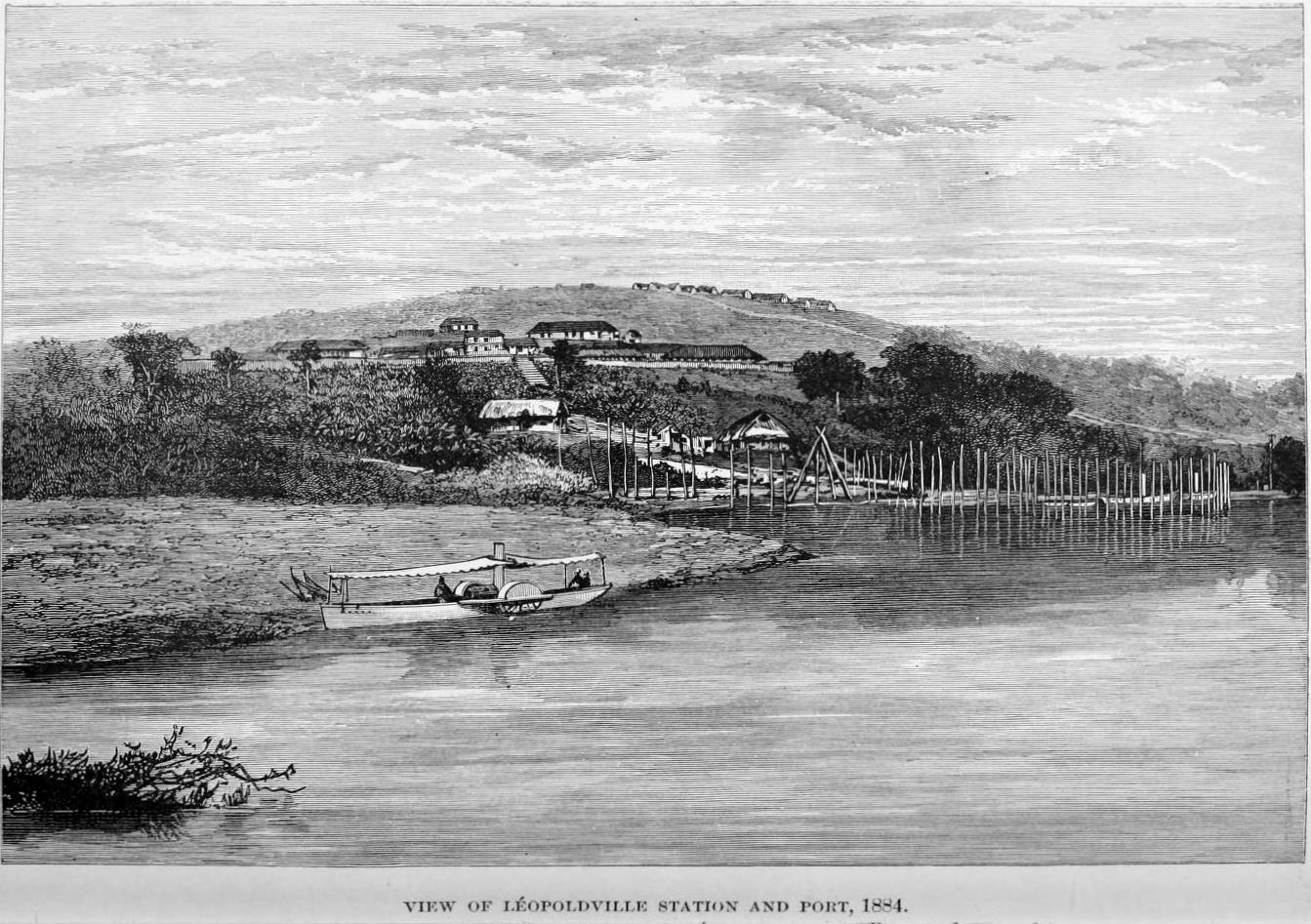
View of Leopoldville Station and Port in 1884

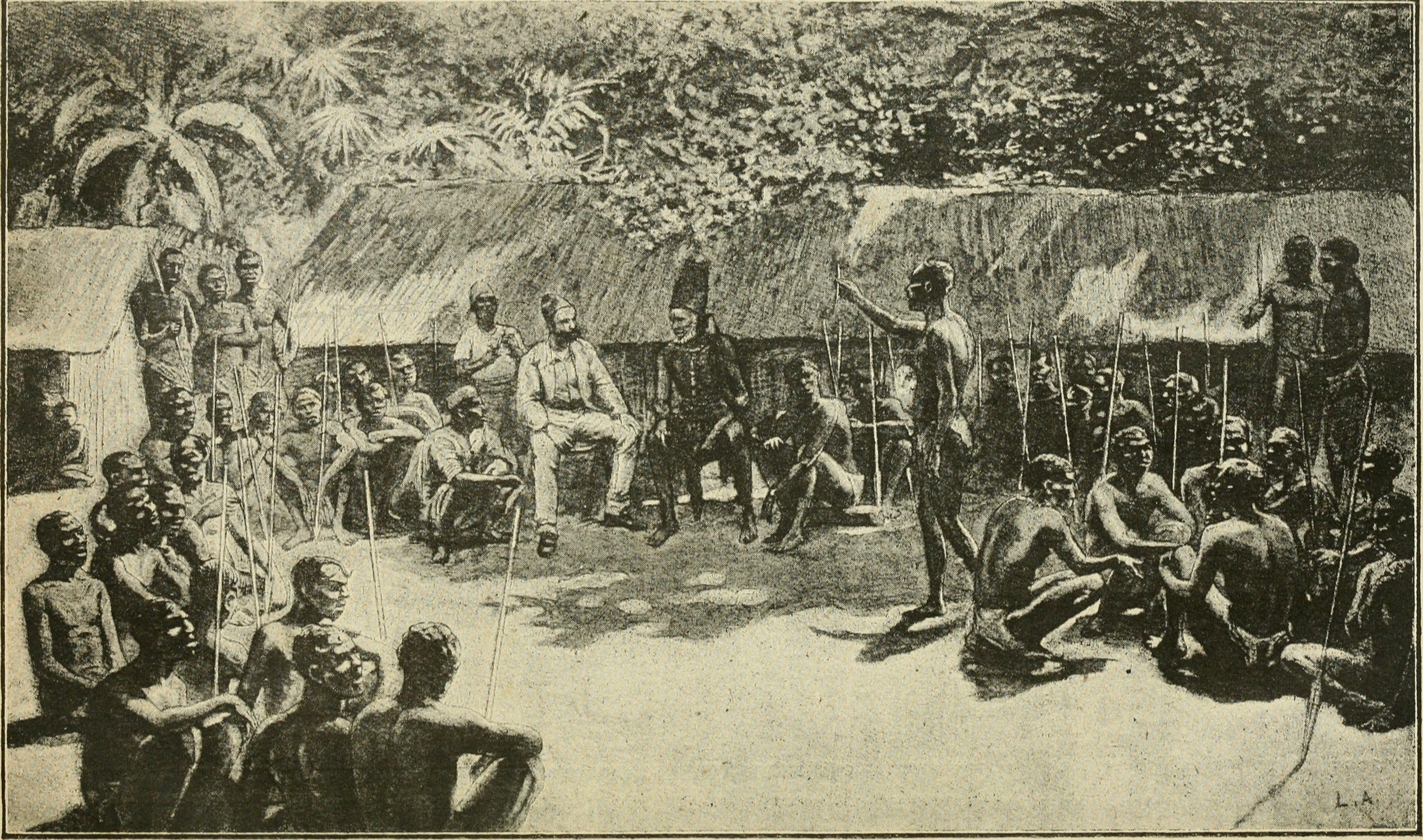
Congo Free State official Camille Coquilhat with the Bangala chief Mata-Buiké, c. 1888

=== Belgian Congo (1908–60) ===
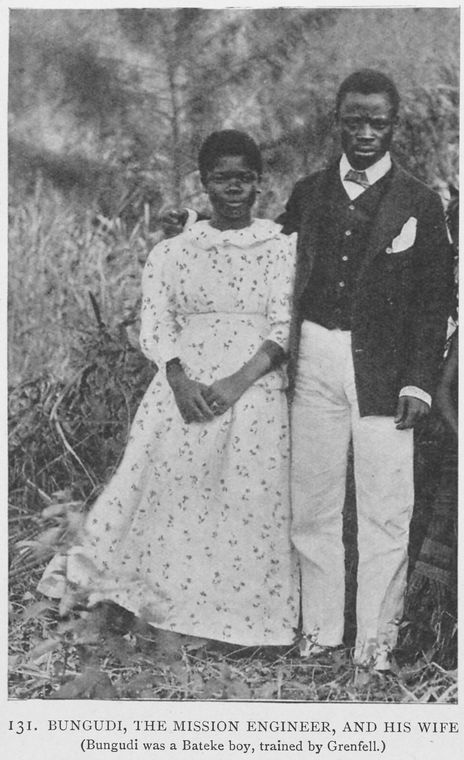
1908 photograph of a married Christian couple

On 15 November 1908 King Leopold II of Belgium formally relinquished personal control of the Congo Free State. The renamed Belgian Congo was put under the direct administration of the Belgian government and its Ministry of Colonies, assisted by a Colonial Council (Conseil Colonial) (both located in Brussels). The Belgian parliament exercised legislative authority over the Belgian Congo. As a result, all major decisions affecting the Belgian Congo were taken in Brussels by white officials, without any involvement of Africans.

The transition from the Congo Free State to the Belgian Congo was a break, but it also featured a large degree of continuity. The last governor-general of the Congo Free State, Baron Théophile Wahis, remained in office in the Belgian Congo and the majority of Leopold II's administration with him. Despite ending the most extreme abuses of the Congo Free State, Belgian rule remained characterised by institutionalised violence, forced labour, exploitation of the workforce, and entrenched racial discrimination. Opening up the Congo and its natural and mineral riches to the Belgian economy remained the main motive for colonial expansion – however, other priorities, such as healthcare and basic education, slowly gained in importance.

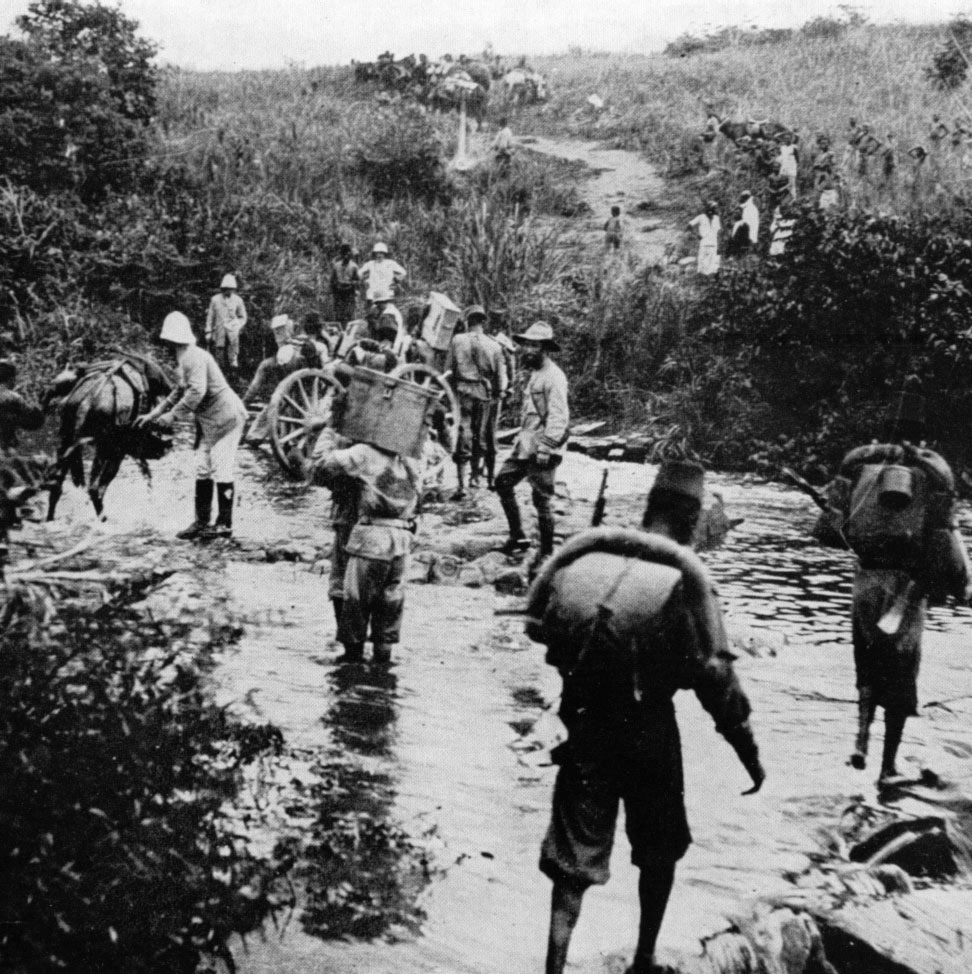
Force Publique soldiers in the Belgian Congo in 1918. At its peak, the Force Publique had around 19,000 Congolese soldiers, led by 420 Belgian officers.

Belgian rule in the Congo was based around the "colonial trinity" (trinité colonial) of state, missionary and private company interests. The privileging of Belgian commercial interests meant that large amounts of capital flowed into the Congo and that individual regions became specialized. The interests of the government and private enterprise became closely tied; the state helped companies break strikes and remove other barriers imposed by the indigenous population.

Colonial administrators governed the territory through a rigid, hierarchical system of administrative subdivisions, applying a uniform native policy (politique indigène) across the colony. A dual legal system operated alongside this structure, with European courts and indigenous tribunals (tribunaux indigènes), in which the latter possessed only limited authority and remained firmly under colonial control. The Belgian authorities permitted no political activity in the Congo whatsoever, and the Force Publique put down any attempts at rebellion. Unlike the British and French preference for indirect rule through existing traditional leaders, Belgian administration exercised direct control over both governance and justice.

There was also a high degree of racial segregation. Large numbers of white immigrants who moved to the Congo after the end of World War II came from across the social spectrum, but were nonetheless always treated as superior to blacks. A small European elite dominated the political and economic life of the Belgian Congo, while Africans supplied most of the labour and derived little benefit in return. Racial segregation shaped the Congo into a system comparable to apartheid, with separate residential areas and social facilities for whites and blacks. Capital punishment was applied only to black Congolese, while access to higher education was largely denied to them.

The Belgian Congo was directly involved in the two world wars. During World War I (1914–1918), an initial stand-off between the Force Publique and the German colonial army in German East Africa turned into open warfare with a joint Anglo-Belgian-Portuguese invasion of German colonial territory in 1916 and 1917 during the East African campaign. The Force Publique gained a notable victory when it marched into Tabora in September 1916 under the command of General Charles Tombeur after heavy fighting.

In 1923 the colonial capital moved from Boma to Léopoldville, some 300 kilometres (190 mi) further upstream into the interior.

During World War II, the Belgian Congo provided a crucial source of income for the Belgian government in exile in London, and the Force Publique again participated in Allied campaigns in Africa. Belgian Congolese forces under the command of Belgian officers notably fought against the Italian colonial army in Ethiopia in Asosa, Bortaï and Saïo under Major-General Auguste-Eduard Gilliaert.

During the 1940s and 1950s, the Congo experienced an unprecedented level of urbanization and the colonial administration began various development programs aimed at making the territory into a "model colony". Notable advances were made in treating diseases such as African trypanosomiasis. Living standards improved noticeably for parts of the Congolese population between 1945 and 1960. One of the results of these measures was the development of a new middle class of Europeanised African évolués in the cities. By the 1950s the Congo had a wage labor force twice as large as that in any other African colony. The Congo's rich natural resources, including uranium—much of the uranium used by the U.S. nuclear programme during World War II was Congolese—led to substantial interest in the region from both the Soviet Union and the United States as the Cold War developed.

==== Rise in Congolese political activity ====
During the latter stages of World War II a new social stratum emerged in the Congo, known as the évolués. Forming an African middle class in the colony, they held skilled positions (such as clerks and nurses) made available by the economic boom. While there were no universal criteria for determining évolué status, it was generally accepted that one would have "a good knowledge of French, adhere to Christianity, and have some form of post-primary education." Early on in their history, évolués sought to use their unique status to earn special privileges in the Congo. Since opportunities for upward mobility through the colonial structure were limited, the évolué class institutionally manifested itself in elite clubs through which they could enjoy trivial privileges that made them feel distinct from the Congolese "masses". Additional groups, such as labor unions, alumni associations, and ethnic syndicates, provided other Congolese the means of organization. Among the most important of these was the Alliance des Bakongo (ABAKO), representing the Kongo people of the Lower Congo. However, they were restricted in their actions by the administration. While white settlers were consulted in the appointment of certain officials, the Congolese had no means of expressing their beliefs through the governing structures. Though native chiefs held legal authority in some jurisdictions, in practice they were used by the administration to further its own policies.

Up into the 1950s, most évolués were concerned only with social inequalities and their treatment by the Belgians. Questions of self-government were not considered until 1954 when ABAKO requested that the administration consider a list of suggested candidates for a Léopoldville municipal post. That year the association was taken over by Joseph Kasa-Vubu, and under his leadership, it became increasingly hostile to the colonial authority and sought autonomy for the Kongo regions in the Lower Congo. In 1956 a group of Congolese intellectuals under the tutelage of several European academics issued a manifesto calling for a transition to independence over the course of 30 years. The ABAKO quickly responded with a demand for "immediate independence". The Belgian government was not prepared to grant the Congo independence and even when it started realizing the necessity of a plan for decolonization in 1957, it was assumed that such a process would be solidly controlled by Belgium. In December 1957 the colonial administration instituted reforms that permitted municipal elections and the formation of political parties. Some Belgian parties attempted to establish branches in the colony, but these were largely ignored by the population in favour of Congolese-initiated groups. Nationalism fermented in 1958 as more évolués began interacting with others outside of their own locales and started discussing the future structures of a post-colonial Congolese state. Nevertheless, most political mobilisation occurred along tribal and regional divisions. In Katanga, various tribal groups came together to form the Confédération des associations tribales du Katanga (CONAKAT) under the leadership of Godefroid Munongo and Moïse Tshombe. Hostile to immigrant peoples, it advocated provincial autonomy and close ties with Belgium. Most of its support was rooted in individual chiefs, businessmen, and European settlers of southern Katanga. It was opposed by Jason Sendwe's Association Générale des Baluba du Katanga (BALUBAKAT).

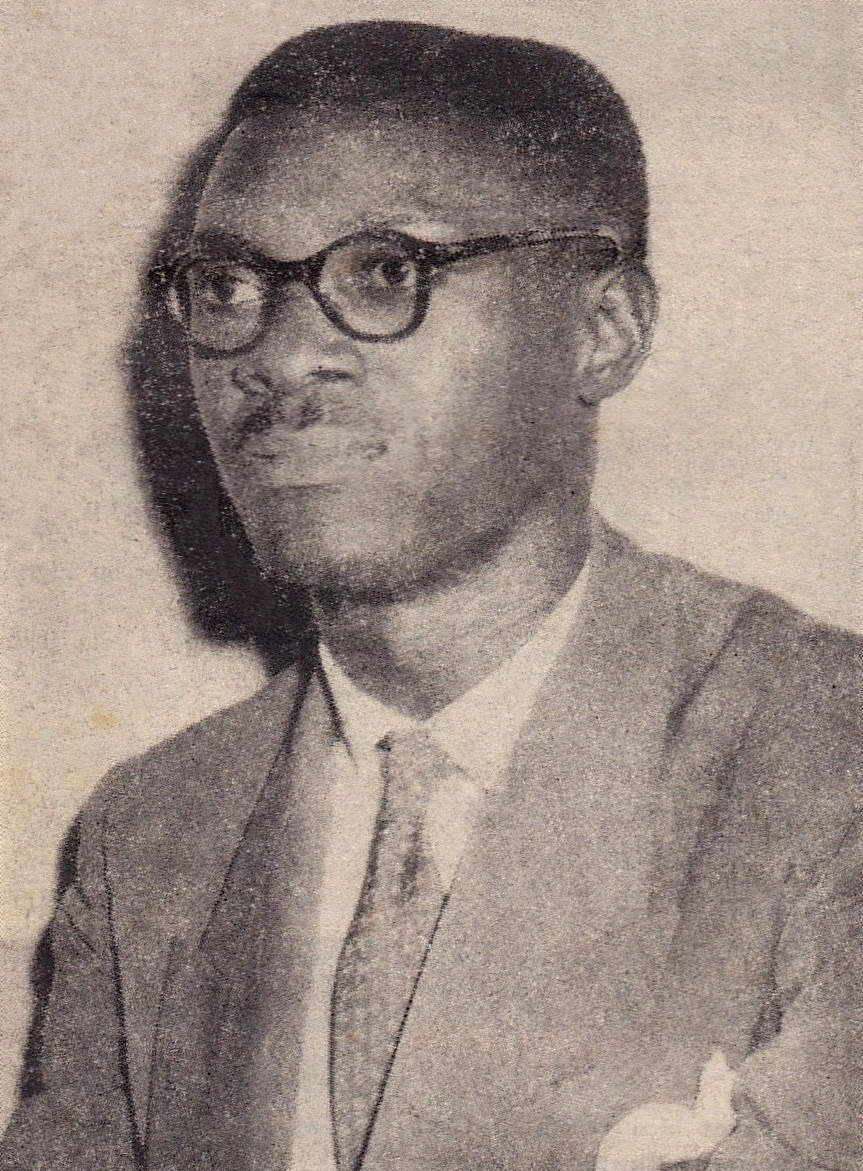
Patrice Lumumba, founding member and leader of the MNC

In October 1958 a group of Léopoldville évolués including Patrice Lumumba, Cyrille Adoula and Joseph Iléo established the Mouvement National Congolais (MNC). Diverse in membership, the party sought to peacefully achieve Congolese independence, promote the political education of the populace, and eliminate regionalism. The MNC drew most of its membership from the residents of the eastern city of Stanleyville, where Lumumba was well known, and from the population of the Kasai Province, where efforts were directed by a Muluba businessman, Albert Kalonji. Belgian officials appreciated its moderate and anti-separatist stance and allowed Lumumba to attend the All-African Peoples' Conference in Accra, Ghana, in December 1958 (Kasa-Vubu was informed that the documents necessary for his travel to the event were not in order and was not permitted to go). Lumumba was deeply impressed by the Pan-Africanist ideals of Ghanaian President Kwame Nkrumah and returned to the Congo with a more radical party programme. He reported on his trip during a widely attended rally in Léopoldville and demanded the country's "genuine" independence.

Fearing that they were being overshadowed by Lumumba and the MNC, Kasa-Vubu and the ABAKO leadership announced that they would be hosting their own rally in the capital on 4 January 1959. The municipal government (under Belgian domination) was given short notice, and communicated that only a "private meeting" would be authorised. On the scheduled day of the rally the ABAKO leadership told the crowd that had gathered that the event was postponed and that they should disperse. The mass was infuriated and instead began hurling stones at the police and pillaging European property, initiating three days of violent and destructive riots. The Force Publique, the colonial army, was called into service and suppressed the revolt with considerable brutality. In wake of the riots Kasa-Vubu and his lieutenants were arrested. Unlike earlier expressions of discontent, the grievances were conveyed primarily by uneducated urban residents, not évolués. Popular opinion in Belgium was one of extreme shock and surprise. An investigative commission found the riots to be the culmination of racial discrimination, overcrowding, unemployment, and wishes for more political self-determination. On 13 January the administration announced several reforms, and the Belgian King, Baudouin, declared that independence would be granted to the Congo in the future.

Meanwhile, discontent surfaced among the MNC leadership, who were bothered by Lumumba's domination over the party's politics. Relations between Lumumba and Kalonji also grew tense, as the former was upset with how the latter was transforming the Kasai branch into an exclusively Luba group and antagonising other tribes. This culminated into the split of the party into the MNC-Lumumba/MNC-L under Lumumba and the MNC-Kalonji/MNC-K under Kalonji and Iléo. The latter began advocating federalism. Adoula left the organisation. Alone to lead his own faction and facing competition from ABAKO, Lumumba became increasingly insistent in his demands for independence. Following an October riot in Stanleyville he was arrested. Nevertheless, the influence of himself and the MNC-L continued to grow rapidly. The party advocated for a strong unitary state, nationalism, and the termination of Belgian rule and began forming alliances with regional groups, such as the Kivu-based Centre du Regroupement Africain (CEREA). Though the Belgians supported a unitary system over the federal models suggested by ABAKO and CONAKAT, they and more moderate Congolese were unnerved by Lumumba's increasingly extremist attitudes. With the implicit support of the colonial administration, the moderates formed the Parti National du Progrès (PNP) under the leadership of Paul Bolya and Albert Delvaux. It advocated centralisation, respect for traditional elements, and close ties with Belgium. In southern Léopoldville Province, a socialist-federalist party, the Parti Solidaire Africain (PSA) was founded. Antoine Gizenga served as its president, and Cléophas Kamitatu was in charge of the Léopoldville Province chapter.

== Independence and the Congo Crisis (1960–65) ==
Following the riots in Leopoldville (4–7 January 1959) and in Stanleyville (31 October 1959), the Belgians realised they could not maintain control of such a vast country in the face of rising demands for independence. Belgian and Congolese political leaders held a Round Table Conference in Brussels beginning on 18 January 1960.

At the end of the conference, on 27 January 1960, it was announced that elections would be held in the Congo on 22 May 1960, and full independence granted on 30 June 1960. The elections produced the nationalist Patrice Lumumba as prime minister, and Joseph Kasavubu as president. On independence the country adopted the name "Republic of the Congo" (République du Congo). The French colony of Middle Congo (Moyen Congo) also chose the name Republic of the Congo upon its independence, so the two countries were more commonly known as Congo-Léopoldville and Congo-Brazzaville, after their capital cities.

In 1960, the country was very unstable—regional tribal leaders held far more power than the central government—and with the departure of the Belgian administrators, almost no skilled bureaucrats remained in the country. The first Congolese graduated from university only in 1956, and very few in the new nation had any idea how to manage a country of such size.

On 5 July 1960, a military mutiny by Congolese soldiers against their European officers broke out in the capital and rampant looting began. On 11 July 1960 the richest province of the country, Katanga, seceded under Moise Tshombe. The United Nations sent 20,000 peacekeepers to protect Europeans in the country and try to restore order. Western paramilitaries and mercenaries, often hired by mining companies to protect their interests, also began to pour into the country. In this period Congo's second richest province, Kasai, also announced its independence on 8 August 1960.

After trying to get help from the United States and the United Nations, Prime Minister Lumumba turned to the USSR for assistance. Nikita Khrushchev agreed to help, offering advanced weaponry and technical advisors. The United States viewed the Soviet presence as an attempt to take advantage of the situation and gain a proxy state in sub-Saharan Africa. UN forces were ordered to block any shipments of arms into the country. The United States also looked for a way to replace Lumumba as leader. President Kasavubu had clashed with Prime Minister Lumumba and advocated an alliance with the West rather than the Soviets. The U.S. sent weapons and CIA personnel to aid forces allied with Kasavubu and combat the Soviet presence.

On 23 August, the Congolese armed forces invaded South Kasai and perpetrated massacres against the Luba people. Lumumba was dismissed from office on 5 September 1960 by Kasavubu who publicly blamed him for the massacres in South Kasai and for involving Soviets in the country. On 14 September 1960, with CIA support, Colonel Joseph Mobutu overthrew the government and arrested Lumumba. A technocratic government, the College of Commissioners-General, was established.

On 17 January 1961 Mobutu sent Lumumba to Élisabethville (now Lubumbashi), capital of Katanga. In full view of the press he was beaten and forced to eat copies of his own speeches. For three weeks afterward, he was not seen or heard from. Then Katangan radio announced implausibly that he had escaped and been killed by villagers. It was soon clear that in fact he had been tortured and killed along with two others shortly after his arrival. In 2001, a Belgian inquiry established that he had been shot by Katangan gendarmes in the presence of Belgian officers, under Katangan command. Lumumba was beaten, placed in front of a firing squad with two allies, cut up, buried, dug up and what remained was dissolved in acid.

In Stanleyville, those loyal to the deposed Lumumba set up a rival government under Antoine Gizenga which lasted from 31 March 1961 until it was reintegrated on 5 August 1961. After some reverses, UN and Congolese government forces succeeded in recapturing the breakaway provinces of South Kasai on 30 December 1961, and Katanga on 15 January 1963.

Beginning in 1964, in the east of the country, Soviet and Cuban backed rebels called the Simbas rose up, taking a significant amount of territory and proclaiming a communist "People's Republic of the Congo" in Stanleyville. As the Congolese government was reclaiming territory from the Simbas, the rebels resorted to taking the local white population hostage. Belgian and American forces pushed the Simbas out of Stanleyville in November 1964 during a hostage rescue operation. Congolese government forces, supported by European mercenaries, fully defeated the Simba rebels by November 1965. The Simba rebels executed 20,000 Congolese and 392 Western hostages, including 268 Belgians, during the rebellion. Tens of thousands of people were killed in total during the suppression of the Simbas.

== Zaire (1965–1997) ==
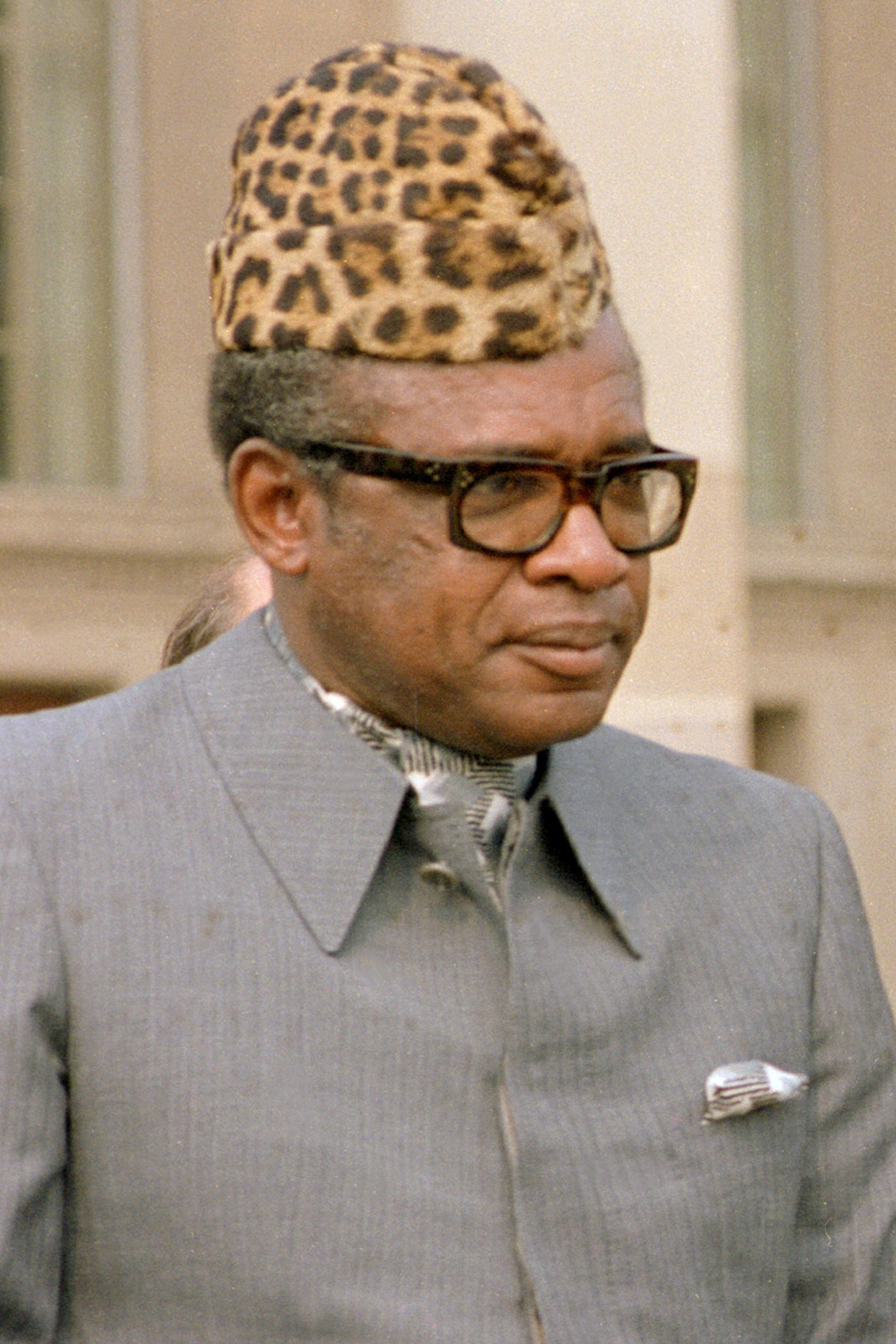
Mobutu Sese Seko

Unrest and rebellion plagued the government until November 1965, when Lieutenant General Joseph-Désiré Mobutu, by then commander in chief of the national army, seized control of the country and declared himself president for the next five years. Mobutu quickly consolidated his power, despite the Stanleyville mutinies of 1966 and 1967, and was elected unopposed as president in a sham election in 1970 for a seven-year term.

Embarking on a campaign of cultural awareness, President Mobutu renamed the country the "Republic of Zaire" in 1971 and required citizens to adopt African names and drop their French-language ones. The name comes from Portuguese, adapted from the Kongo word nzere or nzadi ("river that swallows all rivers"). Among other changes, Leopoldville became Kinshasa and Katanga Shaba.

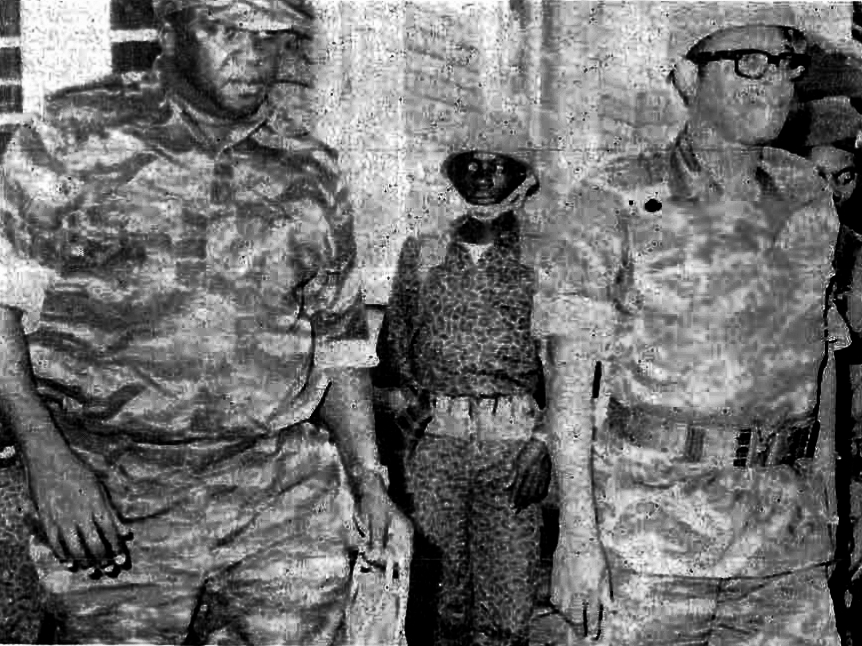
Ugandan President Idi Amin Visits Zaire and Meets Mobutu during The Shaba I Conflict

Relative peace and stability prevailed until 1977 and 1978 when Katangan Front for Congolese National Liberation rebels, based in the Angolan People's Republic, launched the Shaba I and II invasions into the southeast Shaba region. These rebels were driven out with the aid of French and Belgian paratroopers plus Moroccan troops. An Inter-African Force remained in the region for some time afterwards.

Zaire remained a one-party state in the 1980s. Although Mobutu successfully maintained control during this period, opposition parties, most notably the Union pour la Démocratie et le Progrès Social (UDPS), were active. Mobutu's attempts to quell these groups drew significant international criticism.

As the Cold War came to a close, internal and external pressures on Mobutu increased. In late 1989 and early 1990, Mobutu was weakened by a series of domestic protests, by heightened international criticism of his regime's human rights practices, by a faltering economy, and by government corruption, most notably his own massive embezzlement of government funds for personal use.

In April 1990, Mobutu declared the Third Republic, agreeing to a limited multi-party system with free elections and a constitution. As details of the reforms were delayed, soldiers in September 1991 began looting Kinshasa to protest their unpaid wages. Two thousand French and Belgian troops, some of whom were flown in on U.S. Air Force planes, arrived to evacuate the 20,000 endangered foreign nationals in Kinshasa.

In 1992, after previous similar attempts, the long-promised Sovereign National Conference was staged, encompassing over 2,000 representatives from various political parties. The conference gave itself a legislative mandate and elected Archbishop Laurent Monsengwo Pasinya as its chairman, along with Étienne Tshisekedi, leader of the UDPS, as prime minister. By the end of the year Mobutu had created a rival government with its own prime minister. The ensuing stalemate produced a compromise merger of the two governments into the High Council of Republic-Parliament of Transition (HCR-PT) in 1994, with Mobutu as head of state and Kengo Wa Dondo as prime minister. Although presidential and legislative elections were scheduled repeatedly over the next two years, they never took place.

== Civil wars (1996–2003) ==
=== First Congo War (1996–97) ===
By 1996, tensions from the war and genocide in neighboring Rwanda had spilled over into Zaire. Rwandan Hutu militia forces (Interahamwe) who had fled Rwanda following the ascension of a Tutsi-led government had been using Hutu refugee camps in eastern Zaire as bases for incursions into Rwanda. In October 1996 Rwandan forces attacked refugee camps in the Ruzizi Plain near the intersection of the Congolese, Rwandan and Burundi borders meet, scattering refugees. They took Uvira, then Bukavu, Goma and Mugunga.

Hutu militia forces soon allied with the Zairian armed forces (FAZ) to launch a campaign against Congolese ethnic Tutsis in eastern Zaire. In turn, these Tutsis formed a militia to defend themselves against attacks. When the Zairian government began to escalate the massacres in November 1996, Tutsi militias erupted in rebellion against Mobutu.

The Tutsi militia was soon joined by various opposition groups and supported by several countries, including Rwanda and Uganda. This coalition, led by Laurent-Desire Kabila, became known as the Alliance des Forces Démocratiques pour la Libération du Congo-Zaïre (AFDL). The AFDL, now seeking the broader goal of ousting Mobutu, made significant military gains in early 1997. Various Zairean politicians who had unsuccessfully opposed the dictatorship of Mobutu for many years now saw an opportunity for them in the invasion of Zaire by two of the region's strongest military forces. Following failed peace talks between Mobutu and Kabila in May 1997, Mobutu left the country on 16 May. The AFDL entered Kinshasa unopposed a day later, and Kabila named himself president, reverting the name of the country to the Democratic Republic of the Congo. He marched into Kinshasa on 20 May and consolidated power around himself and the AFDL.

In September 1997, Mobutu died in exile in Morocco.

=== Second Congo War (1998–2003) ===
Kabila demonstrated little ability to manage the problems of his country, and lost his allies. To counterbalance the power and influence of Rwanda in DRC, Ugandan troops created another rebel movement called the Movement for the Liberation of Congo (MLC), led by the Congolese warlord Jean-Pierre Bemba. They attacked in August 1998, backed by Rwandan and Ugandan troops. Soon afterwards, Angola, Namibia, and Zimbabwe became involved militarily in the Congo, with Angola and Zimbabwe supporting the government. While the six African governments involved in the war signed a ceasefire accord in Lusaka in July 1999, the Congolese rebels did not and the ceasefire broke down within months.

Kabila was assassinated in 2001 by a bodyguard called Rashidi Kasereka, 18, who was then shot dead, according to Justice Minister Mwenze Kongolo. Another account of the assassination says that the real killer escaped.

Kabila was succeeded by his son, Joseph. Upon taking office, Kabila called for multilateral peace talks to end the war. Kabila partly succeeded when a further peace deal was brokered between him, Uganda, and Rwanda leading to the apparent withdrawal of foreign troops.

Currently, the Ugandans and the MLC still hold a 200-mile (320 km) wide section of the north of the country; Rwandan forces and its front, the Rassemblement Congolais pour la Démocratie (RCD) control a large section of the east; and government forces or their allies hold the west and south of the country. There were reports that the conflict is being prolonged as a cover for extensive looting of the substantial natural resources in the country, including diamonds, copper, zinc, and coltan. The conflict was reignited in January 2002 by ethnic clashes in the northeast and both Uganda and Rwanda then halted their withdrawal and sent in more troops. Talks between Kabila and the rebel leaders, held in Sun City, lasted a full six weeks, beginning in April 2002. In June, they signed a peace accord under which Kabila would share power with former rebels. By June 2003, all foreign armies except those of Rwanda had pulled out of Congo.

Few people in the Congo have been unaffected by the conflict. A survey conducted in 2009 by the ICRC and Ipsos shows that three-quarters (76%) of the people interviewed have been affected in some way–either personally or due to the wider consequences of armed conflict.

The response of the international community has been incommensurate with the scale of the disaster resulting from the war in the Congo. Its support for political and diplomatic efforts to end the war has been relatively consistent, but it has taken no effective steps to abide by repeated pledges to demand accountability for the war crimes and crimes against humanity that were routinely committed in Congo. The United Nations Security Council and the U.N. Secretary-General have frequently denounced human rights abuses and the humanitarian disaster that the war unleashed on the local population, but have shown little will to tackle the responsibility of occupying powers for the atrocities taking place in areas under their control, areas where the worst violence in the country took place. In particular Rwanda and Uganda have escaped any significant sanction for their role.

== Joseph Kabila period ==
=== Transitional government (2003–2006) ===
DR Congo had a transitional government in July 2003 until the election was over. A constitution was approved by voters and on 30 July 2006 the Congo held its first multi-party elections since independence in 1960. Joseph Kabila took 45% of the votes and his opponent Jean-Pierre Bemba 20%. That was the origin of a fight between the two parties from 20 to 22 August 2006 in the streets of the capital, Kinshasa. Sixteen people died before policemen and MONUC took control of the city. A new election was held on 29 October 2006, which Kabila won with 70% of the vote. Bemba has decried election "irregularities". On 6 December 2006 Joseph Kabila was sworn in as president.

=== Kabila overstays his term ===
In December 2011, Joseph Kabila was re-elected for a second term as president. After the results were announced on 9 December, there was violent unrest in Kinshasa and Mbuji-Mayi, where official tallies showed that a strong majority had voted for the opposition candidate Étienne Tshisekedi. Official observers from the Carter Center reported that returns from almost 2,000 polling stations in areas where support for Tshisekedi was strong had been lost and not included in the official results. They described the election as lacking credibility. On 20 December, Kabila was sworn in for a second term, promising to invest in infrastructure and public services. However, Tshisekedi maintained that the result of the election was illegitimate and said that he intended also to "swear himself in" as president.

On 19 January 2015 protests led by students at the University of Kinshasa broke out. The protests began following the announcement of a proposed law that would allow Kabila to remain in power until a national census can be conducted (elections had been planned for 2016). By Wednesday 21 January clashes between police and protesters had claimed at least 42 lives (although the government claimed only 15 people had been killed).

Similarly, in September 2016, violent protests were met with brutal force by the police and Republican Guard soldiers. Opposition groups claim 80 dead, including the Students' Union leader. From Monday 19 September Kinshasa residents, as well as residents elsewhere in Congo, were mostly confined to their homes. Police arrested anyone remotely connected to the opposition as well as innocent onlookers. Government propaganda, on television, and actions of covert government groups in the streets, acted against opposition as well as foreigners. The president's mandate was due to end on 19 December 2016, but no plans were made to elect a replacement at that time and this caused further protests.

== Félix Tshisekedi Presidency (2019–present) ==
On 30 December 2018 the presidential election to determine the successor to Kabila was held. On 10 January 2019, the electoral commission announced opposition candidate Félix Tshisekedi as the winner of the vote. He was officially sworn in as president on 24 January 2019. in the ceremony of taking of the office Félix Tshisekedi appointed Vital Kamerhe as his chief of staff. In June 2020, chief of staff Vital Kamerhe was found guilty of embezzling public funds and he was sentenced to 20 years in prison. However, Kamerhe was released in December 2021.

The political allies of former president Joseph Kabila, who stepped down in January 2019, maintained control of key ministries, the legislature, judiciary and security services. However, President Felix Tshisekedi succeeded to strengthen his hold on power. In a series of moves, he won over more legislators, gaining the support of almost 400 out of 500 members of the National Assembly. The pro-Kabila speakers of both houses of parliament were forced out. In April 2021, the new government was formed without the supporters of Kabila. President Felix Tshisekedi succeeded to oust the last remaining elements of his government who were loyal to former leader Joseph Kabila. In January 2021, DRC's President Félix Tshisekedi pardoned all those convicted in the murder of Laurent-Désiré Kabila in 2001. Colonel Eddy Kapend and his co-defendants, who have been incarcerated for 15 years, were released.

After the 2023 presidential election, Tshisekedi had a clear lead in his run for a second term. On 31 December 2023, officials said that President Felix Tshisekedi had been re-elected with 73% of the vote. Nine opposition candidates signed a declaration rejecting the election and called for a rerun. In October 2025, former president Joseph Kabila was sentenced to death in absentia for alleged collaboration with the rebel group M23.

== Continued conflicts ==
The inability of the state and the world's largest United Nations peacekeeping force to provide security throughout the vast country has led to the emergence of up to 120 armed groups by 2018, perhaps the largest number in the world. Armed groups are often accused of being proxies or being supported by regional governments interested in Eastern Congo's vast mineral wealth. Some argue that much of the lack of security by the national army is strategic on the part of the government, who let the army profit from illegal logging and mining operations in return for loyalty. Different rebel groups often target civilians by ethnicity and militias often become oriented around ethnic local militias known as "Mai-Mai".

=== Conflict in Kivu (2004–present) ===
==== Tutsi led insurgency ====
Flag of CNDP

Laurent Nkunda with other soldiers from RCD-Goma who were integrated into the army defected and called themselves the National Congress for the Defence of the People (CNDP). Starting in 2004, CNDP, believed to be backed by Rwanda as a way to tackle the Hutu group Democratic Forces for the Liberation of Rwanda (FDLR), rebelled against the government, claiming to protect the Banyamulenge (Congolese Tutsis). In 2009, after a deal between the DRC and Rwanda, Rwandan troops entered the DRC and arrested Nkunda and were allowed to pursue FDLR militants. The CNDP signed a peace treaty with the government where its soldiers would be integrated into the national army.

In April 2012, the leader of the CNDP, Bosco Ntaganda and troops loyal to him mutinied, claiming a violation of the peace treaty and formed a rebel group, the March 23 Movement (M23), which was believed to be backed by Rwanda. On 20 November 2012, M23 took control of Goma, a provincial capital with a population of one million people. The UN authorized the Force Intervention Brigade (FIB), which was the first UN peacekeeping force with a mandate to neutralize opposition rather than a defensive mandate, and the FIB quickly defeated M23. The FIB was then to fight the FDLR but were hampered by the efforts of the Congolese government, who some believe tolerate the FDLR as a counterweight to Rwandan interests. Since 2017, fighters from M23, most of whom had fled into Uganda and Rwanda (both were believed to have supported them), started crossing back into DRC with the rising crisis over Kabila's extension of his term limit.

After rising insecurity, President Tshisekedi declared a "state of siege" or state of emergency in North Kivu, as well as Ituri province, in the first such declaration since the country's independence. The military and police took over positions from civilian authorities and some saw it as a powerplay since the civilian officials were part of the opposition to the President. A similar declaration was avoided for South Kivu, in a move believed to avoid antagonizing armed groups with ties to regional powers such as Rwanda.

==== Mai Mai insurgencies ====
Ethnic conflict in Kivu has often involved the Congolese Tutsis known as Banyamulenge, a cattle herding group of Rwandan origin derided as outsiders, and other ethnic groups who consider themselves indigenous. Additionally, neighboring Burundi and Rwanda, who have a thorny relationship, are accused of being involved, with Rwanda accused of training Burundi rebels who have joined with Mai Mai against the Banyamulenge and the Banyamulenge is accused of harboring the RNC, a Rwandan opposition group supported by Burundi. In June 2017, the group was formed called the National Coalition of the People for the Sovereignty of Congo (CNPSC) or Alliance of Article 64, a reference to Article 64 of the constitution, which says the people have an obligation to fight the efforts of those who seek to take power by force, in reference to President Kabila. It is one of three alliances of various Mai-Mai militias and is led by Bembe warlord William Yakutumba whose Mai-Mai Yakutumba is the largest component of the CNPSC and has had friction with the Congolese Tutsis. was formed and even briefly capturing a few strategic towns. In May 2019, Banyamulenge fighters killed a Banyindu traditional chief, Kawaza Nyakwana. Later in 2019, a coalition of militias from the Bembe, Bafuliru and Banyindu are estimated to have burnt more than 100, mostly Banyamulenge, villages and stole tens of thousands of cattle from the largely cattle-herding Banyamulenge. About 200,000 people fled their homes.

Clashes between Hutu militias and militias of other ethnic groups has also been prominent. In 2012, the Congolese army in its attempt to crush the Rwandan backed and Tutsi-dominated CNDP and M23 rebels, empowered and used Hutu groups such as the FDLR and a Hutu dominated Maï Maï Nyatura as proxies in its fight. The Nyatura and FDLR even arbitrarily executed up to 264 mostly Tembo civilians in 2012. In 2015, the army then launched an offensive against the FDLR militia. The FDLR and Nyatura were accused of killing Nande people and of burning their houses. The Nande-dominate UPDI militia, a Nande militia called Mai-Mai Mazembe and a militia dominated by Nyanga people, the "Nduma Defense of Congo" (NDC), also called Maï-Maï Sheka and led by Gédéon Kyungu Mutanga, are accused of attacking Hutus. In North Kivu, in 2017, an alliance of Mai-Mai groups called the National Movement of Revolutionaries (MNR) began attacks in June 2017 includes Nande Mai-Mai leaders from groups such as Corps du Christ and Mai-Mai Mazembe. Another alliance of Mai-Mai groups is CMC which brings together Hutu militia Nyatura and are active along the border between North Kivu and South Kivu. In September 2019, the army declared it had killed Sylvestre Mudacumura, head of the FDLR, and in November that year the army declared it had killed Juvenal Musabimana, who had led a splinter group of the FDLR.

==== Allied Democratic Forces insurgency ====
The Allied Democratic Forces (ADF) has been waging an insurgency in the Democratic Republic of the Congo and is blamed for the Beni massacre in 2016. While the Congolese army maintains that the ADF is an Islamist insurgency, most observers feel that they are only a criminal group interested in gold mining and logging. In March 2021, the United States claimed that the ADF was linked to the Islamic State of Iraq and the Levant as part of the Islamic State's Central Africa Province. By 2021, the ADF was considered the deadliest of the many armed groups in the east of the country.

=== Conflict in Katanga ===
In Northern Katanga Province starting in 2013, the Pygmy Batwa people, (Note: The two major divisions of Pygmies in the DRC are the Bambuti, or Mbuti, who largely live in the Ituri forest in the northeast, and the Batwa, but many Batwa in certain areas of the country also refer to themselves as Bambuti.) whom the Luba people often exploit and allegedly enslave, rose up into militias, such as the "Perci" militia, and attacked Luba villages. A Luba militia known as "Elements" or "Elema" attacked back, notably killing at least 30 people in the "Vumilia 1" displaced people camp in April 2015. Since the start of the conflict, hundreds have been killed and tens of thousands have been displaced from their homes. The weapons used in the conflict are often arrows and axes, rather than guns.

Elema also began fighting the government mainly with machetes, bows and arrows in Congo's Haut Katanga and Tanganyika provinces. The government forces fought alongside a tribe known as the Abatembo and targeting civilians of the Luba and the Tabwa tribes who were believed to be sympathetic to the Elema.

=== Conflict in Kasai ===
Kasaï-Central province, where the Kamwina Nsapu militia clashes with security forces began.

In the Kasaï-Central province, starting in 2016, the largely Luba Kamwina Nsapu militia led by Kamwina Nsapu attacked state institutions. The leader was killed by authorities in August 2016 and the militia reportedly took revenge by attacking civilians. By June 2017, more than 3,300 people had been killed and 20 villages have been completely destroyed, half of them by government troops. The militia has expanded to the neighboring Kasai-Oriental area, Kasaï and Lomami.

The UN discovered dozens of mass graves. There was an ethnic nature to the conflict with the rebels being mostly Luba and Lulua and have selectively killed non-Luba people while the government allied militia, the Bana Mura, constituting people from the Chokwe, Pende, and Tetela, have committed ethnically motivated attacks against the Luba and Lulua.

=== Conflict in Ituri ===
The Ituri conflict in the Ituri region of the north-eastern DRC involved fighting between the agriculturalist Lendu and pastoralist Hema ethnic groups, who together made up around 40% of Ituri's population, with other groups including the Ndo-Okebo and the Nyali. During Belgian rule, the Hema were given privileged positions over the Lendu while long time leader Mobutu Sese Seko also favored the Hema. While "Ituri conflict" often refers to the major fighting from 1999 to 2003, fighting has existed before and continues since that time. During the Second Congolese Civil War, Ituri was considered the most violent region. An agricultural and religious group from the Lendu people known as the "Cooperative for the Development of Congo" or CODECO allegedly reemerged as a militia in 2017 and began attacking the Hema as well as the Alur people to control the resources in the region, with the Ndo-Okebo and the Nyali also involved in the violence. After disagreements over negotiating with the government and the killing of CODECO's leader, Ngudjolo Duduko Justin, in March 2020, the group splintered and violence spread into new areas. In late 2020, CODECO briefly held the capital of the province, Bunia, but retreated. In June 2019, attacks by CODECO led to 240 people being killed and more than 300,000 people fleeing.

The Allied Democratic Forces (ADF), mostly active in North and South Kivu has also been involved in Ituri province. President Tshisekedi declared a "state of siege" or state of emergency in the province in May 2021 to tackle ADF. However, ADF killed 57 civilians in one attack in the same month in one of its deadliest single attacks. 30 people were massacred in September 2021 by the ADF. The President is accused of promoting former rebel leaders and generals accused of war crimes to be in charge of the province.

=== Conflict in the Northwest ===
==== Dongo Conflict ====
In October 2009 a conflict started in Dongo, Sud-Ubangi District where clashes had broken out over access to fishing ponds.

==== Yumbi Massacre (2018) ====
Nearly 900 people were killed between 16 and 17 December 2018 around Yumbi, a few weeks before the Presidential election, when mostly those of the Batende tribe massacred mostly those of the Banunu tribe. About 16,000 fled to neighboring Republic of the Congo. It was alleged that it was a carefully planned massacre, involving elements of the national military.

== See also ==
- Economic history of the Democratic Republic of the Congo
- Former place names in the Democratic Republic of the Congo
- History of Africa
- List of heads of state of the Democratic Republic of the Congo
- List of heads of government of the Democratic Republic of the Congo
- Politics of the Democratic Republic of the Congo
- Cities in DR Congo:
  - Bukavu history and timeline
  - Goma history and timeline
  - Kinshasa history and timeline
  - Kisangani history and timeline
  - Lubumbashi history and timeline

== Sources ==
- Borstelmann, Thomas (1993). Apartheid, Colonialism, and the Cold War: the United States and Southern Africa, 1945–1952. New York: Oxford University Press. ISBN 978-0-19-507942-5.
- Freund, Bill (1998). The Making of Contemporary Africa: The Development of African Society since 1800 (2nd ed.). Basingstoke: Palgrave-Macmillan. ISBN 978-0-333-69872-3.
- Gibbs, David N. (1991). The Political Economy of Third World Intervention: Mines, Money, and U.S. Policy in the Congo Crisis. American Politics and Political Economy. Chicago: University of Chicago Press. ISBN 9780226290713.
- Hoskyns, Catherine (1965). The Congo Since Independence: January 1960 – December 1961. London: Oxford University Press. OCLC 414961.
- Lemarchand, René (1964). Political Awakening in the Belgian Congo. Berkeley: University of California Press. OCLC 905074256.
- Merriam, Alan P. (1961). Congo: Background of Conflict. Evanston, Illinois: Northwestern University Press. OCLC 424186.
- Nzongola-Ntalaja, Georges (2002). The Congo: From Leopold to Kabila: A People's History (illustrated, reprint ed.). London: Zed Books. ISBN 9781842770535.
- Turner, Thomas (2007). The Congo Wars: Conflict, Myth, and Reality (2nd ed.). London: Zed Books. ISBN 978-1-84277-688-9.
- Willame, Jean-Claude (1972). Patrimonialism and Political Change in the Congo. Stanford: Stanford University Press. ISBN 978-0-8047-0793-0.
- Young, Crawford (1965). Politics in the Congo: Decolonization and Independence. Princeton: Princeton University Press. OCLC 307971.
