= Formation of the Lumumba Government =

Government in the Democratic Republic of the Congo (June–September 1960)

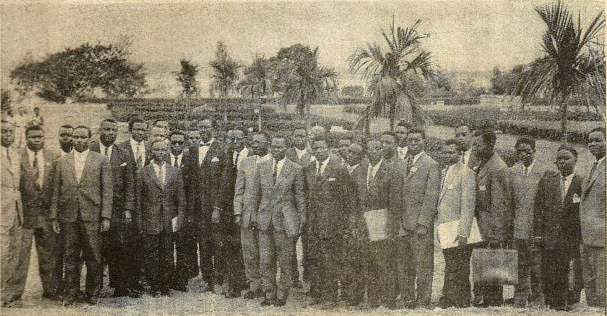
Prime Minister Patrice Lumumba (left center, wearing bow tie) with his government outside the Palais de la Nation following its investiture

The Lumumba Government was the first set of ministers, ministers of state, and secretaries of state that governed the Democratic Republic of the Congo (then Republic of the Congo) under the leadership of Prime Minister Patrice Lumumba from 24 June until 12 September 1960. It was hastily formed over the period of several weeks in June, and was supported by a slight majority coalition in Parliament. Weak and divided, its tenure was dominated by a widespread mutiny in the army and two secessions.

The Belgian Congo was a tightly administered colony and for most of is existence there were few political freedoms. Following World War II, a period of economic growth led to the creation of an African middle class, the évolués. The évolués demanded better conditions for the native Congolese and more latitude to engage in politics. In the late 1950s municipal elections were held and restrictions on political parties were lifted. An independence movement quickly emerged, led by figures such as Patrice Lumumba and Joseph Kasa-Vubu. Fears that the situation might turn violent led the Belgian government to agree to relinquish the Congo and grant it independence on 30 June 1960. A provisional constitution, providing for a bicameral parliamentary regime with a responsible government and prime minister and an irresponsible head of state, was instituted, and general elections were hastily organised.

Lumumba's nationalist party, the Mouvement National Congolais (MNC), won a plurality of the seats in Parliament, much to the disappointment of the Belgians. In the following weeks Lumumba and his more moderate opponents both attempted to form their own coalitions to secure the parliamentary majority necessary for a vote of confidence in a government. After much hesitation, King Baudouin of Belgium appointed Lumumba formateur, tasking him with creating a government. On 23 June Lumumba announced his completed government, consisting of 23 ministers, 4 ministers of state, and 10 secretaries of state, and presented it to the lower house of Parliament, the Chamber of Deputies. Though it represented nearly all major parties, many deputies were displeased with its composition and the vote of confidence succeeded by only a small margin. The Senate gave a more decisive vote of approval the following day, and the Lumumba Government was officially invested. With Lumumba's backing, Parliament elected Kasa-Vubu President.

== Background ==
=== Belgian rule of the Congo ===
The Belgian Congo, highlighted on a map of Africa

Colonial rule in the Congo began in the late 19th century. King Leopold II of Belgium, frustrated by Belgium's lack of international power and prestige, attempted to persuade the Belgian government to support colonial expansion around the largely unexplored Congo Basin. The Belgian government's ambivalence about the idea led Leopold to eventually create the colony on his own account. With support from a number of Western countries, who viewed Leopold as a useful buffer between rival colonial powers, Leopold achieved international recognition for a personal colony, the Congo Free State, in 1885. By the turn of the century, however, the violence of Free State officials against indigenous Congolese and the ruthless system of economic extraction had led to intense diplomatic pressure on Belgium to take official control of the country, which it did in 1908, creating the Belgian Congo. The colony was divided into six provinces: Léopoldville, Équateur, Orientale, Kivu, Kasai, and Katanga. The city of Léopoldville was designated as the capital in 1923.

Belgian rule in the Congo was based around the "colonial trinity" (trinité coloniale) of state, missionary and private company interests. The privileging of Belgian commercial interests meant that capital sometimes flowed back into the Congo and that individual regions became specialised. On many occasions, the interests of the government and private enterprise became closely tied and the state helped companies with strikebreaking and countering other efforts by the indigenous population to improve their situation. The country was split into nesting, hierarchically organised administrative subdivisions, and run uniformly according to a set "native policy" (politique indigène)—in contrast to the British and the French, who generally favoured the system of indirect rule whereby traditional leaders were retained in positions of authority under colonial oversight. As early as the 1920s, the Congo possessed one of the densest colonial regimes in Africa. The administration was heavily involved in the life of the Congolese; Belgian functionaries closely monitored and enforced agricultural production, provided medical services to many residents, and frequently toured even the most rural territories to oversee their subjects. There was also a high degree of racial segregation. Large numbers of white immigrants who moved to the Congo after the end of World War II came from across the social spectrum, but were nonetheless always treated as superior to blacks.

=== Rise in Congolese political activity ===
During the latter stages of World War II a new social stratum emerged in the Congo, known as the évolués. Forming an African middle class in the colony, they held skilled positions (such as clerks and nurses) made available by the economic boom. While there were no universal criteria for determining évolué status, it was generally accepted that one would have "a good knowledge of French, adhere to Christianity, and have some form of post-primary education." Early on in their history, most évolués sought to use their unique status to earn special privileges in the Congo, asking that the colonial administration recognise their role as intermediaries between the Belgians and the native "savages." Since opportunities for upward mobility through the colonial structure were limited, the évolué class institutionally manifested itself in elite clubs through which they could enjoy trivial privileges that made them feel distinct from the Congolese "masses". Additional groups, such as labour unions, alumni associations, and ethnic syndicates, provided other Congolese the means of organisation. Among the most important of these was the Alliance des Bakongo (ABAKO), representing the Kongo people of the Lower Congo. However, they were restricted in their actions by the administration. While white settlers were consulted in the appointment of certain officials, the Congolese had no means of expressing their beliefs through the governing structures. Though native chiefs held legal authority in some jurisdictions, in practice they were used by the administration to further its own policies.

Up into the 1950s most évolués were concerned only with social inequalities and their treatment by the Belgians. Questions of self-government were not considered until 1954, when ABAKO requested that the administration consider a list of suggested candidates for a Léopoldville municipal post. That year the association was taken over by Joseph Kasa-Vubu, and under his leadership it became increasingly hostile to the colonial authority and sought autonomy for the Kongo regions in the Lower Congo. In 1956 a group of Congolese intellectuals under the tutelage of several European academics issued a manifesto calling for a transition to independence over the course of 30 years. The ABAKO quickly responded with a demand for "immediate independence". The Belgian government was not prepared to grant the Congo independence and even when it started realising the necessity of a plan for decolonisation in 1957, it was assumed that such a process would be solidly controlled by Belgium. In December 1957 the colonial administration instituted reforms that permitted municipal elections and the formation of political parties. Some Belgian parties attempted to establish branches in the colony, but these were largely ignored by the population in favour of Congolese-initiated groups. Nationalism fermented in 1958 as more évolués began interacting with others outside of their own locales and started discussing the future structures of a post-colonial Congolese state. Nevertheless, most political mobilisation occurred along tribal and regional divisions. In Katanga, various tribal groups came together to form the Confédération des associations tribales du Katanga (CONAKAT) under the leadership of Godefroid Munongo and Moïse Tshombe. Hostile to immigrant peoples, it advocated provincial autonomy and close ties with Belgium. Most of its support was rooted in individual chiefs, businessmen, and European settlers of southern Katanga. It was opposed by Jason Sendwe's Association Générale des Baluba du Katanga (BALUBAKAT).

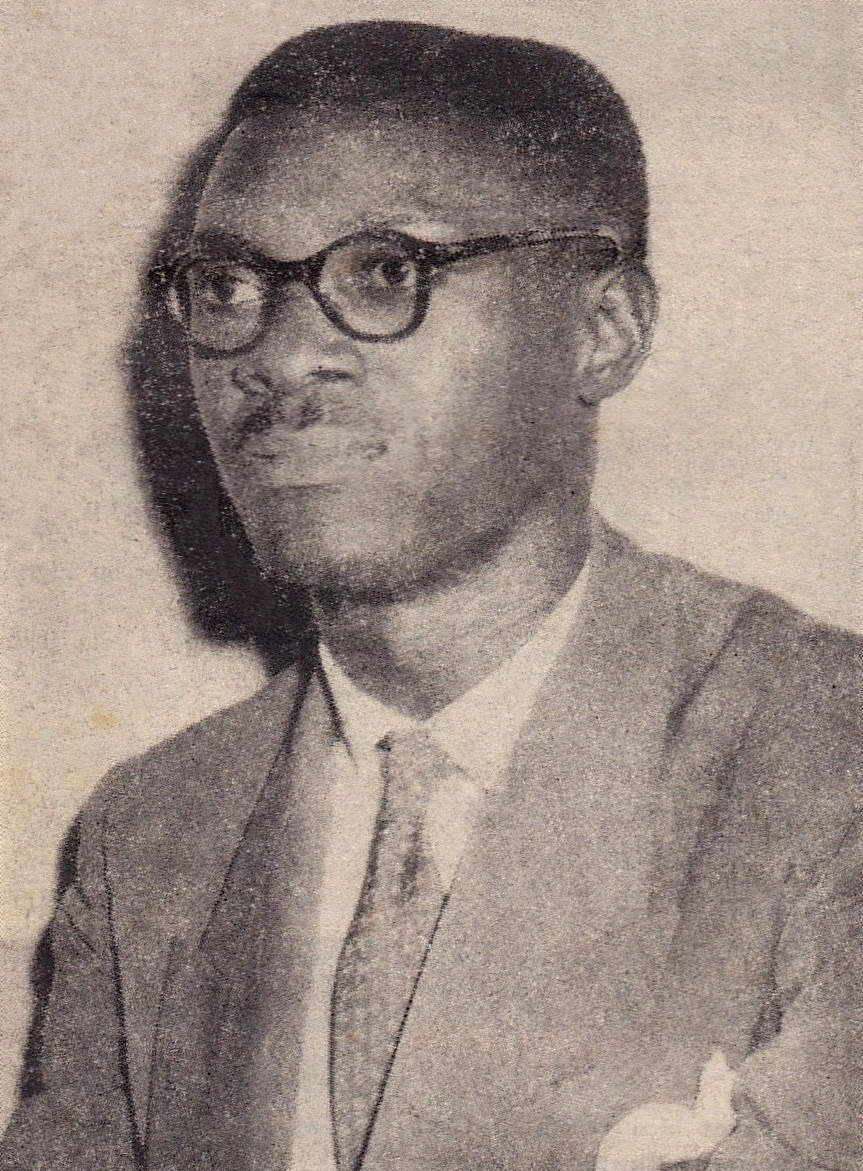
Patrice Lumumba, founding member and leader of the MNC

In October 1958 a group of Léopoldville évolués including Patrice Lumumba, Cyrille Adoula and Joseph Iléo established the Mouvement National Congolais (MNC). Diverse in membership, the party sought to peacefully achieve Congolese independence, promote the political education of the populace, and eliminate regionalism. The MNC drew most of its membership from the residents of the eastern city of Stanleyville, where Lumumba was well known, and from the population of the Kasai Province, where efforts were directed by a Muluba businessman, Albert Kalonji. Belgian officials appreciated its moderate and anti-separatist stance and allowed Lumumba to attend the All-African Peoples' Conference in Accra, Ghana, in December 1958 (Kasa-Vubu was informed that the documents necessary for his travel to the event were not in order and was not permitted to go). Lumumba was deeply impressed by the Pan-Africanist ideals of Ghanaian President Kwame Nkrumah and returned to the Congo with a more radical party programme. He reported on his trip during a widely attended rally in Léopoldville and demanded the country's "genuine" independence.

Fearing that they were being overshadowed by Lumumba and the MNC, Kasa-Vubu and the ABAKO leadership announced that they would be hosting their own rally in the capital on 4 January 1959. The municipal government (under Belgian domination) was given short notice, and communicated that only a "private meeting" would be authorised. On the scheduled day of the rally the ABAKO leadership told the crowd that had gathered that the event was postponed and that they should disperse. The mass was infuriated and instead began hurling stones at the police and pillaging European property, initiating three days of violent and destructive riots. The Force Publique, the colonial army, was called into service and suppressed the revolt with considerable brutality. In wake of the riots Kasa-Vubu and his lieutenants were arrested. Unlike earlier expressions of discontent, the grievances were conveyed primarily by uneducated urban residents, not évolués. The repression deeply angered the Bakongo and allowed ABAKO to expand its influence into rural areas. Popular opinion in Belgium was one of extreme shock and surprise. An investigative commission found the riots to be the culmination of racial discrimination, overcrowding, unemployment, and wishes for more political self-determination. On 13 January the administration announced several reforms, and the Belgian King, Baudouin, declared that independence would be granted to the Congo in the future.

Meanwhile, discontent grew among the MNC leadership, who were upset with Lumumba's domination over the party's politics. An attempt by members of the central committee to oust him in July failed. Relations between Lumumba and Kalonji also grew tense, as the former was upset with how the latter was transforming the Kasai branch into an exclusively Luba group and antagonising other tribes. This culminated into the split of the party into the MNC-Lumumba/MNC-L under Lumumba and the MNC-Kalonji/MNC-K under Kalonji and Iléo. The latter began advocating federalism. Adoula left the organisation. Alone to lead his own faction and facing competition from ABAKO, Lumumba became increasingly strident in his demands for independence. Following an October riot in Stanleyville he was arrested. Nevertheless, the influence of himself and the MNC-L continued to grow rapidly. The party advocated for a strong unitary state, nationalism, and the termination of Belgian rule and began forming alliances with regional groups, such as the Kivu-based Centre du Regroupement Africain (CEREA). Though the Belgians supported a unitary system over the federal models suggested by ABAKO and CONAKAT, they and more moderate Congolese were unnerved by Lumumba's increasingly extremist attitudes. With the implicit support of the colonial administration, the moderates formed the Parti National du Progrès (PNP) under the leadership of Paul Bolya and Albert Delvaux. It advocated centralisation, respect for traditional elements, and close ties with Belgium. In southern Léopoldville Province, a socialist-federalist party, the Parti Solidaire Africain (PSA) was founded. Antoine Gizenga served as its president, and Cléophas Kamitatu was in charge of the Léopoldville Province chapter.

=== The Belgo-Congolese Round Table Conference ===
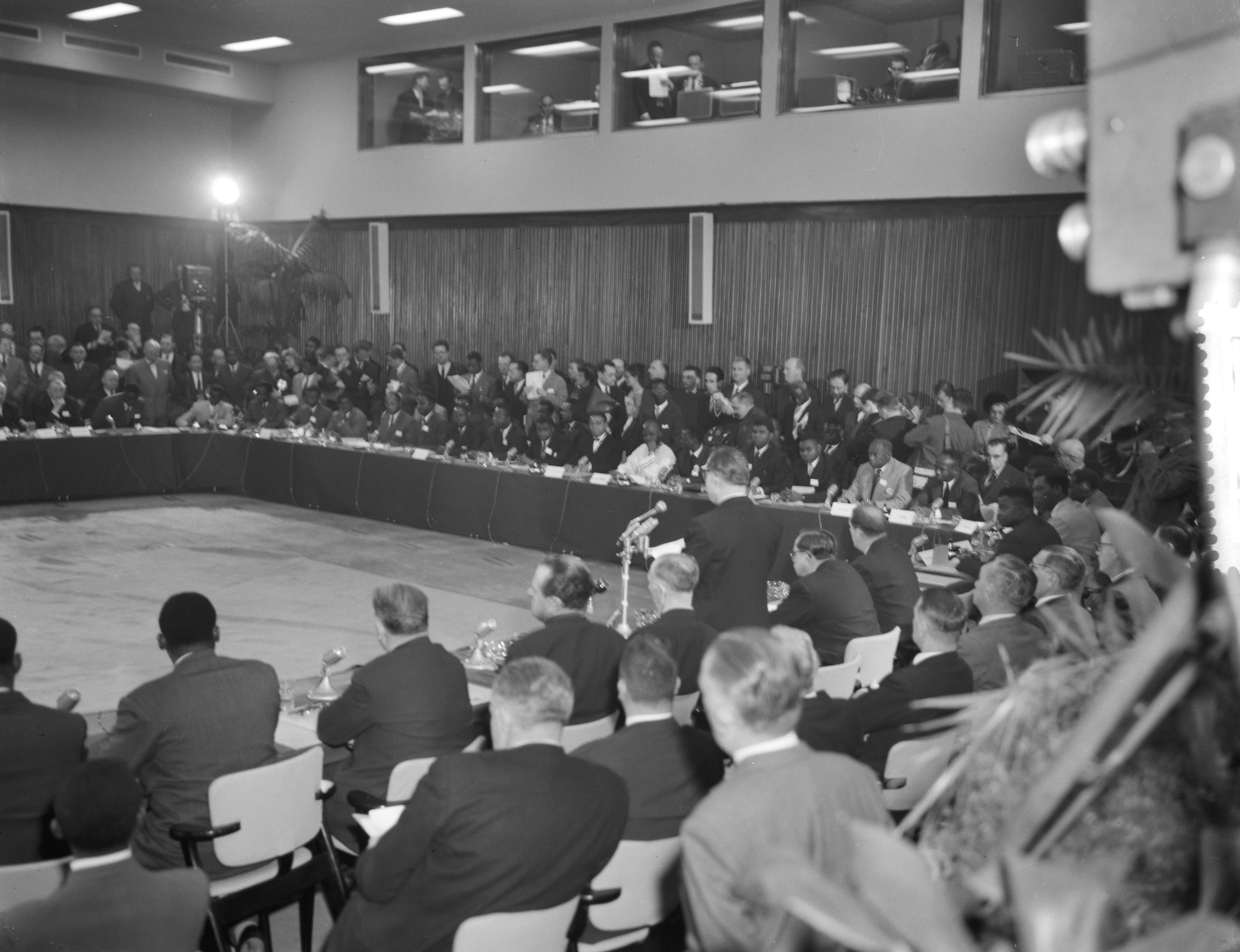
Opening meeting of the Belgo-Congolese Round Table Conference on 20 January 1960

After the riots of 4 January 1959 Belgian leaders became increasingly fearful of a violent political conflict emerging in the Congo. The security situation in the country deteriorated over the course of the year, especially in the Lower Congo and in Kasai, where violent clashes between Baluba and Lulua were taking place. Fearing the degeneration of the unrest into a colonial war and facing intense pressure for reform, in late 1959 the Belgian government announced that it would host a round table conference in Brussels in 1960 with the Congolese leadership to discuss the political future of the country.

On the eve of the conference the Congolese delegations banded into a "Common Front" and demanded that all decisions be made binding on the Belgian government and that the Congo be granted immediate independence. The display of unity surprised the Belgians and strengthened the Congolese bargaining position. The conference formally opened on 20 January. In the first speech, the Belgian Prime Minister assured that the Congo would be granted independence but did not specify a date. Serious negotiations did not commence until the following day. Kasa-Vubu demanded that a Congolese government be formed immediately, but his request was denied. Disagreements between him and the Belgians over the competence of the conference led to the former walking out during the negotiations. His uncompromising style caused a split with ABAKO vice president Daniel Kanza, who remained as a delegate and suggested that the date of independence be discussed. Lumumba, meanwhile, at the behest of the Congolese delegations, was released from prison and flew to Brussels to participate in the conference. On 27 January he made his first appearance and voiced his support for independence. After some discussion the Common Front accepted the date of 30 June 1960 for sovereignty to be granted to the Congo. Questions over whether Belgium would retain any responsibilities after independence for a transitional period were resolved by a committee, which recommended that all powers should be conferred upon the Congolese state and any technical assistance should be agreed upon through a treaty. The decisions of the delegates were ratified in a series of resolutions on 19 February and the conference closed the following day.

One of the resolutions called for another conference to be held to negotiate the economic transition of the Congo. The financial situation of the Congo was deteriorating, and while the Belgians sought to commit the Congolese to solid agreements, the latter wanted a more open-ended discussion about the Congo's economic future. The conference opened on 20 April. Most of the Congolese attendees of the earlier round table were occupied by domestic political affairs and did not attend. The conference dissolved without the Congolese making many serious guarantees, though they obtained for the Congolese state a large number of shares in the Union Minière du Haut Katanga (UMHK), a highly profitable mining company.

=== The Loi Fondementale ===
It was decided at the Round Table Conference that the resolutions the participants adopted would serve as the basis for the Loi Fondementale (Fundamental Law), a temporary draft constitution left for the Congo until a permanent one could be promulgated by a Congolese parliament. Summarising the similarities between the Loi Fondementale and the Constitution of Belgium, Raymond Scheyven, Minister-in-charge of Economic Affairs for the Congo, observed, "We have presented the Congolese with a political system similar to ours....It features communes, provincial assemblies, a bicameral system, and a political system where the head of state is irresponsible."

The division of executive power between a presumably symbolic head of state and head of government was the most noticeable and potentially harmful feature borrowed from the Belgian constitution. As in a parliamentary system, such power was to be exercised by a Prime Minister and a cabinet responsible to Parliament. If the cabinet lost the confidence of Parliament, a motion of censure would be passed (either with a simple majority in both houses of a two-thirds majority in a single house) and it would be dismissed. By comparison, the head of state (a President) was irresponsible and only had the power to ratify treaties, promulgate laws, and nominate high-ranking officials (including the Prime Minister and the cabinet). In Belgium, parliamentary tradition had rendered these duties inconsequential in the face of the premier's influence. (Note: Researchers of the Belgium-based Centre de recherche et d'information socio-politiques, Belgian law professor François Perin, Scheyven, and De Witte, among others, concluded that the author of the Loi Fondementale had intended for the head of state to be a symbolic office, with real authority exercised by the parliamentary regime.) But in the Congo, no such convention had been established. The Loi Fondementale defined the government as solely "the Prime Minister and the Ministers"; the office of the President was regarded as a separate institution.

A parliament was to be composed of a lower chamber and an upper chamber. The lower chamber (Chamber of Deputies) consisted of 137 members directly "elected by universal suffrage according to the procedure fixed by the electoral law" with one deputy for every 100,000 people. The upper chamber (Senate) would consist of 14 members from each province, elected by the members of their respective provincial assemblies. Senators and deputies that assumed a ministerial post in the central government were allowed to retain their seats in Parliament. The provincial assemblies were unicameral and varied in size, depending on the population of the provinces they served. A state commissioner would be appointed by the head of state with the consent of the Senate to represent the central government in each province. As per Article 184 of the Loi Fondementale, their main duties were to "administer state services" and "assure coordination of provincial and central institutions."

Articles 219 and 220 delineated the authority of the central and provincial governments. Provincial authorities had the power to organise the "political structures of the province within the general principle contained in the Loi Fondementale", manage provincial police and judicial officials, establish educational systems lower than higher education, tend to agricultural and mining concessions, construct and maintain local railways, roads, and public works, and manage their own finances. Social legislation and minimum wages were to be concurrent powers. All other duties and responsibilities rested with the central government, including foreign affairs, national defence, domestic security, customs and currency, communications, major public works, higher education, national judiciary, and economic planning. In areas where the provincial and central governments took contradictory stances, the central government's positions took precedence. The division of authority, a compromise between the federalist and unitarianist politicians, was dubbed by Belgian lawyers as "quasi-federalism".

The Loi Fondementale was a very complicated and cumbersome document for the Congolese. Without definitive interpretation, it would become the source of serious confusion for officeholders. An absence of parliamentary tradition in the Congo was likely to further destabilise the situation. Ultimately, the Loi Fondementale was not well suited for the Congolese polity.

=== The General Executive College ===
One of the resolutions adopted at the Political Round Table called for the establishment of a Collége Exécutive Général (General Executive College), a body composed of six Congolese (one from each province) designed to share power with the Governor-general until independence. They were as follows: Rémy Mwamba for Katanga, Joseph Kasa-Vubu for Léopoldville, Patrice Lumumba for Orientale, Paul Bolya for Équateur, Pierre Nyanguyle for Kasaï, and Anicet Kashamura for Kivu. A similar system was set up at the provincial level while another six Congolese were attached to the Belgian staff of the ministry in Brussels to study the drafting of new laws and decrees. The members of the college neither held direct responsibility over any departments and nor possessed their own cabinets.

=== General Elections of 1960 ===
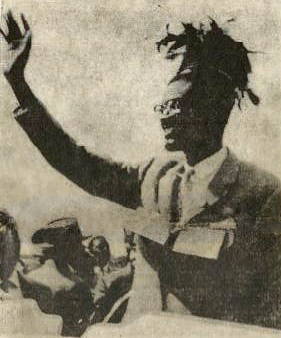
Lumumba waves to his supporters in Stanleyville

Even though the date for independence had been established at the Round Table Conference, there was still substantial uncertainty throughout the Congo as to which faction would come to dominate politics in the new government. This caused deep anxiety among most of the electorate. As the Congolese had little experience in democratic processes, few eligible voters in rural areas realised the meaning and importance of an election, and even fewer understood electoral mechanics and procedure.

Electoral procedure was prescribed by the electoral law of 23 March 1960. Voting was compulsory for all "males of Congolese status". Yet in order to register, one had to be at least 21 years of age and had to have resided in their respective constituency for at least six months. In order to be a candidate for provincial or federal office, one had to be at least 25 years of age, been born to a Congolese mother, and had to have resided in the Congo for at least five years. For aspiring senators, the age requirement was 30.

The official electoral campaign began on 11 May, marred by confusion and violence. Rival parties employed tactics that ranged from threats to sabotage of an opponent's headquarters to murder. Such intimidation was especially prevalent in areas that were under heavy influence from the militant sects of CEREA, the PSA, ABAKO, the MNC-L, and the MNC-K. This was due not only to such parties' own radical, differing beliefs but also to a general suspicion that the Belgians would organise the contest to favor the moderates. With the notable exceptions of CONAKAT, the PNP, and the Parti de l'Unité Nationale (PUNA), most parties' rhetoric was anti-colonial in focus. Frequent attacks on the colonial administration by candidates led to confusion among segments of the electorate, which were given the impression that all forms of government—except welfare services—were to be eliminated after independence. Openly socialist messages declined during the campaign, with the exception of Gizenga's speeches. Freedom of religion was also a major issue, especially in areas where Islam or separatist forms of Christianity were prominent. This led to attacks on the Catholic Church's monopoly on the education system. The MNC-L and the PNP were the only parties to launch significant national campaigns. The parties in favor of a unitary system of government tended to place their best candidates in the central government races, while their federalist counterparts focused on provincial campaigns.

=== Election results ===
==== Chamber of Deputies ====
The results for the Chamber of Deputies were as follows:

Party	Seats
Mouvement National Congolais-Lumumba	41
Parti Solidaire Africain	13
Centre du Regroupement Africain	10
Cartel Katangais	7
Alliance des Bakongo	12
Parti de l'Unité Nationale	7
Union des Mongo	1
Mouvement National Congolais-Kalonji	8
Parti National du Progrès	15
Confédération des associations tribales du Katanga	8
Other	15
Total	137

==== Senate ====
The results for the Senate were as follows:

Party	Seats
Mouvement National Congolais-Lumumba	19
Parti Solidaire Africain	4
Centre du Regroupement Africain	6
Cartel Katangais	3
Alliance des Bakongo	4
Parti de l'Unité Nationale	7
Union des Mongo	4
Mouvement National Congolais-Kalonji	3
Parti National du Progrès	3
Confédération des associations tribales du Katanga	6
Other	27
Total	84

==== Reactions ====
After the results were announced, Lumumba stated, "I am ready to co-operate with our opponents to from a national union government." Belgium was surprised by the MNC-L's electoral success. Belgians who had anticipated a PNP-led government were revolted at the prospect of Lumumba leading an independent Congo. Many members of the various foreign missions in the Congo, however, believed that he was the only man capable of bringing order and stability to the country. Luluabourg, the provincial capital of Kasai, was designated the provisional seat of Parliament—and by probable extension, the new government—but ethnic violence between the Baluba and Lulua in Kasai led the authorities to remain in Léopoldville.

== Formation ==
=== Appointment of a formateur ===
Articles 47 and 48 of the Loi Fondementale dictated how the first Congolese government was to be formed. In accordance with them, The King of the Belgians would consult with the major political forces that emerged after elections and appoint a formateur (former) who would then create a government "likely to obtain the confidence of [P]arliament". On the advice of the formateur, the King would appoint the Prime Minister and the suggested ministers. Within three days of the nomination the government would have to receive a vote of confidence from both houses of Parliament (in this case, 69 votes in from the Chamber and 43 votes from the Senate would be required). Two obvious courses of action were presented for the Belgians. They could appoint the leader of the party that had won a plurality of seats, Lumumba, and hope that he would be able to form a majority coalition. The other option was to wait for a coalition to form out of the other parties and nominate whoever emerged as leader of it. They chose the latter course, hoping a moderate alliance would materialise to oppose the MNC-L.

The anti-MNC-L coalition that formed principally consisted of the PNP, PUNA, and the MNC-K led by Jean Bolikango (of PUNA), Kalonji, and Iléo (both of MNC-K). Kasa-Vubu aligned himself with the opposition but refused to become its leader. The loyalties of other parties were unsure, and the whole situation was complicated by the divided opinions within the parties themselves. Meanwhile, Lumumba, mindful of his plurality in the Chamber and busy trying to confirm the support of other parties, demanded to be made formateur.

Negotiations on the composition of the first government began on 31 May though a formateur had still not been selected. Belgium had committed itself to 30 June for independence and risked embarrassing itself in the international community if it proceeded without the Congo having its own government. On 2 June, Lumumba held a press conference in which he angrily said, "It would be a crime against the country not to denounce publicly the maneuvers being carried on at this moment by the Belgian government....M. Iléo and M. Bolikango are being promoted and we who have the confidence of the people are being pushed aside."

Six weeks before the date of independence, Walter Ganshof van der Meersch had been appointed the Belgian Minister of African Affairs. He lived in Léopoldville, in effect becoming Belgium's de facto resident minister in the Congo, administering it jointly with Governor-general Hendrik Cornelis. He was charged with advising Baudouin on the selection of a formateur. On 8 June Ganshof flew to Brussels to meet with Baudouin. He made three suggestions for formateur: Lumumba, as the winner of the elections; Kasa-Vubu, the only figure associated with the coalescing opposition with a reliable national reputation; or some to-be-determined third individual who could unite the competing blocs.

Ganshof returned to the Congo on 12 June. The following day he appointed Lumumba to be informateur (informer), tasked with investigating the possibility of forming a national unity government that included politicians with a wide range of views, with 16 June as his deadline. The same day as Lumumba's appointment, the parliamentary opposition coalition, the Cartel d'Union Nationale was announced. Though Kasa-Vubu was aligned with their beliefs, he remained distanced from them. The MNC-L was also having trouble securing the allegiances of the PSA, CEREA, and BALUBAKAT. Initially, Lumumba was unable to establish contact with members of the cartel. Eventually several leaders were appointed to meet with him, but their position remained entrenched. On 16 June Lumumba reported his difficulties to Ganshof, who then extended the deadline and promised to act as an intermediary between the MNC leader and the opposition. However, once he had made contact with the cartel leadership, he was impressed by their obstinacy and assurances of a strong anti-Lumumba polity. By evening Lumumba's mission was showing even less chances of succeeding. Ganshof considered extending the role of informateur to Adoula and Kasa-Vubu, but faced increasing pressure from Belgian and moderate Congolese advisers to end Lumumba's assignment.

The following day Ganshof declared that Lumumba had failed to fulfill his role and terminated his mission. Acting on Ganshof's advice, Baudouin then named Kasa-Vubu formateur. (Note: Ganshof briefly considered recommending Cyrille Adoula for the role, but ultimately decided against it after considering Adoula's lack of popular support and his own decision to keep away from national debate.) Lumumba responded by threatening to form his own government and present it to Parliament without official approval. He then called a meeting at the OK Bar in Léopoldville where he announced the creation of a "popular" government with the support of Pierre Mulele of the PSA. Meanwhile, Kasa-Vubu, like Lumumba, was completely unable to communicate with his political opponents. He assumed that he would secure the Presidency, so he began looking for someone to serve as his prime minister. Most of the candidates he considered were friends that had foreign support similar to his own, including Kalonji, Iléo, Cyrille Adoula, and Justin Bomboko. Kasa-Vubu, however, was slow to come to a final decision. On 18 June Kasa-Vubu announced that he had completed his government with all parties except the MNC-L. That afternoon Sendwe, Gizenga, and Kashamura announced in the presence of Lumumba that their respective parties were not committed to the government. The next day Ganshof summoned Kasa-Vubu and Lumumba to a meeting so they could forge a compromise. This failed when Lumumba flatly refused the position of prime minister in a Kasa-Vubu Government. The following day the two rivals met in the presence of Adoula and diplomats from Israel and Ghana but no agreement was reached.

Most party leaders refused to support a government that did not include Lumumba. The decision to make Kasa-Vubu the formateur rallied the PSA, CEREA, and BALUBAKAT to Lumumba, making it unlikely that he could form a government that would survive a vote of confidence. This was confirmed when the Chamber met on 21 June to select its officers; Joseph Kasongo of the MNC-L was made president with 74 votes (a majority), while the two vice presidencies were secured by the PSA and CEREA candidates, both of whom had the support of Lumumba. With time running out before independence, Baudouin took new advice from Ganshof and made Lumumba formateur. The following day the Senate convened to elect its officers. Though Iléo won the presidency, the two vice presidencies were awarded to BALUBAKAT and the MNC-L.

=== Selection of members ===
Once it was apparent that Lumumba's bloc controlled Parliament, several members of the opposition became eager to negotiate for a coalition government so they could share power. Among these were Bolikango, Delvaux, and Bolya. Their quest for compromise undermined the strength of the anti-MNC-L alliance. An enraged Kalonji criticised Ganshof for allowing Lumumba to be appointed formateur and demanded to be made prime minister.

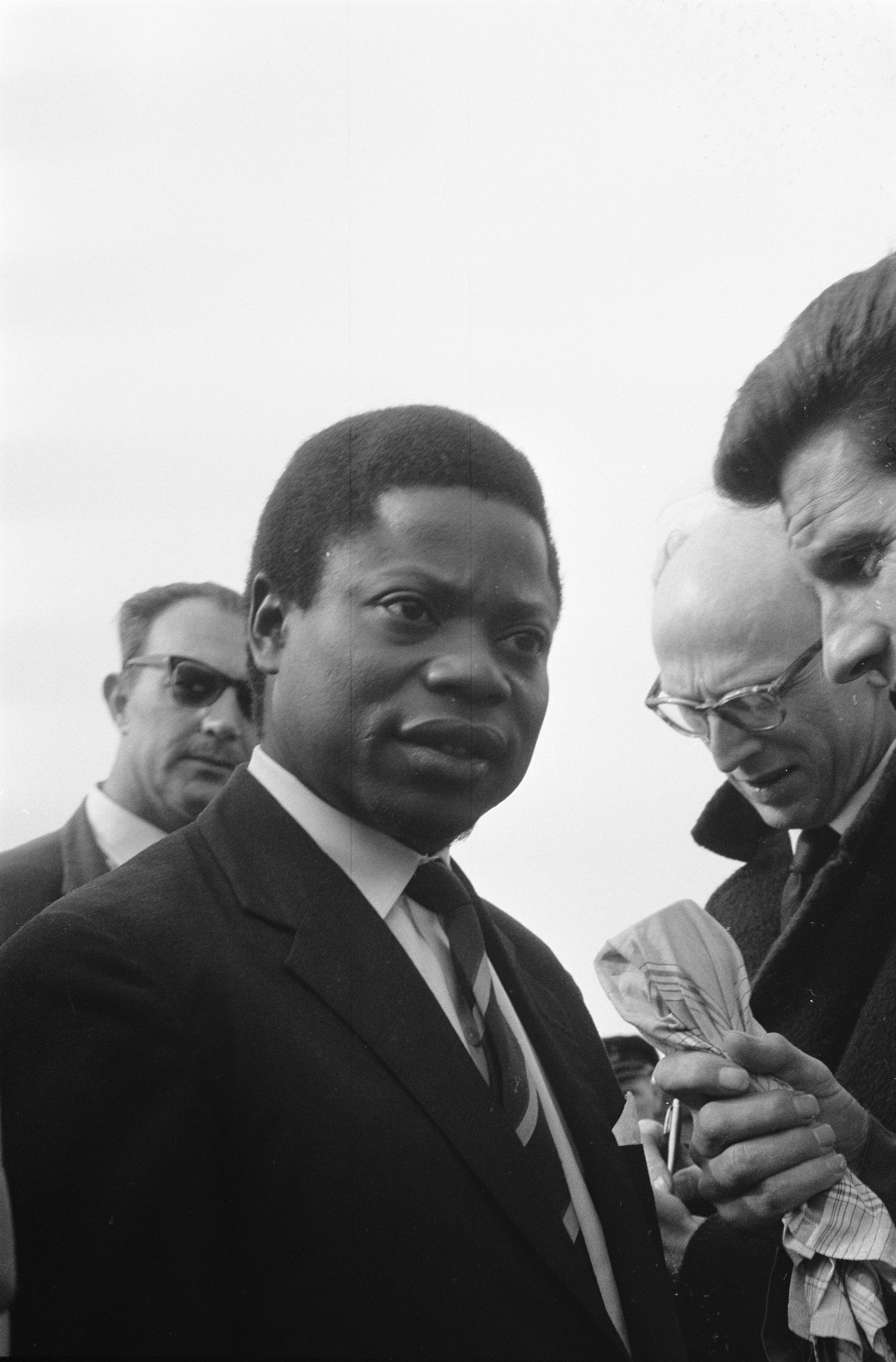
Justin Bomboko, selected by Lumumba after some hesitation to be Minister of Foreign Affairs

By 22 June (shortly before the vote on the Senate's officers) Lumumba's government, headed by himself in the post of prime minister, included members of the MNC-L, the PSA, CEREA, BALUBAKAT, and the Fédération des Association de Ressortissments du Kasaï au Katanga (FEDEKA, a party in a cartel with BALUBAKAT). However, negotiations continued between Lumumba and Bolikango, Delvaux, and Kasa-Vubu. Lumumba reportedly offered ABAKO the ministerial positions for Foreign Affairs and Middle Classes, but Kasa-Vubu instead demanded the Ministry of Finance, a minister of state, the Secretary of State for the Interior, and a written pledge of support from the MNC-L and its allies for his presidential candidacy.

Kalonji was presented with the agriculture portfolio by Lumumba which, in spite of his suitability for the task as an experienced agricultural engineer, he rejected. Adoula was also offered a ministerial position, but refused to accept it. Lumumba had for a while considered offering Daniel Kanza a post in the government, but decided against it after considering the opposition such an appointment would receive from Kasa-Vubu, who he believed would assume the Presidency. Lumumba also weighed his options for the Minister of Foreign Affairs between Thomas Kanza (Daniel Kanza's son), André Mandi, and Justin Bomboko. He mistrusted Bomboko, whom the Belgians supported and with whom he had political differences. Kanza, who was well acquainted with Bomboko, suggested that he himself be made Delegate to the United Nations (UN) with ministerial status, so he could operate with autonomy, while Bomboko should receive charge of Foreign Affairs, because he was an elected deputy and had more political support. Lumumba eventually agreed to this proposal, while Mandi was made Secretary of State for Foreign Affairs.

By the morning of 23 June, the government was, in the words of Lumumba, "practically formed". At noon, he made a counter-offer to Kasa-Vubu, who instead responded with a letter demanding the creation of a seventh province for the Bakongo. Lumumba refused to comply and instead pledged to support Bolikango in his bid for the Presidency. At 14:45 he presented his proposed government before the press. Both ABAKO and the MNC-K were absent from its composition, while the only PSA members were from Gizenga's wing of the party. The Bakongo of Léopoldville were deeply upset by their exclusion from Lumumba's cabinet. They subsequently demanded the removal of the PSA-dominated provincial government and called for a general strike to begin the following morning. At 16:00 Lumumba and Kasa-Vubu resumed negotiations. Kasa-Vubu eventually agreed to Lumumba's earlier offer, though Lumumba informed him that he could not give him a guarantee of support in his presidential candidacy.

As result of the negotiations with Kasa-Vubu, the cabinet was reshuffled to include an ABAKO Minister of Finance. In turn, the suggested Minister of Finance assumed the responsibility of Economic Coordination. The minister unseated by the change inherited the Ministry of Land Affairs, which was split off from the Ministry of Mines. A member of PUNA took over the Ministry of Social Affairs, which was broken off of the Ministry of Labour. ABAKO earned one minister of state and secretary of state. The Secretary of State for the Interior was transferred to the Secretariat for Finance, while PUNA was entrusted with one minister of state. According to Kanza, Lumbala and Mobutu held much influence in the final determination of Lumumba's government. Baudouin also formally decreed Lumumba to be prime minister.

== Composition ==
The government consisted of the following individuals: (Note: Individuals without a party listed next to their name had no known party affiliation. Though not part of the government proper, Lumumba's suggested appointees for state commissioners were announced at the same time as the ministers, ministers of state, and secretaries of state. They were: State Commissioner for Léopoldville Sylvain Kama (PSA), State Commissioner for Équateur Tamusu Fumu, State Commissioner for Kasaï Isaac Kalonji (FEDEKA), State Commissioner for Katanga Jason Sendwe (BALUBAKAT), State Commissioner for Kivu Hubert Sangara, State Commissioner for Orientale Christophe Muzungu (MNC-L).)

=== Ministers ===
1. Prime Minister and Minister of Defence Patrice Lumumba (MNC-L)
2. Deputy Prime Minister Antoine Gizenga (PSA)
3. Foreign Minister Justin Bomboko (UNIMO)
4. Minister of External Commerce Marcel Bisukiro (CEREA)
5. Minister Resident in Belgium Albert Delvaux (PNP-LUKA)
6. Minister of Justice Rémy Mwamba (BALUBAKAT)
7. Minister-Delegate to the United Nations Thomas Kanza
8. Minister of the Interior Christophe Gbenye (MNC-L)
9. Minister of Finance Pascal Nkayi (ABAKO)
10. Minister of Economic Coordination and Planning Aloïs Kabangi (MNC-L)
11. Minister of Public Works Alphonse Ilunga (UNC)
12. Minister of Agriculture Joseph Lutula (MNC-L)
13. Minister of Communications Alphonse Songolo (MNC-L)
14. Minister of Economic Affairs Joseph Yav (CONAKAT)
15. Minister of Labour Joseph Masena (PSA)
16. Minister of Public Health Grégoire Kamanga (COAKA)
17. Minister of Mines and Power Edmond Rudahindwa (REKO)
18. Minister of Social Affairs Antoine Ngwenza (PUNA)
19. Minister of Information and Cultural Affairs Anicet Kashamura (CEREA)
20. Minister of Youth and Sports Maurice Mpolo (MNC-L)
21. Minister of the Middle Classes Joseph Mbuyi (MNC-L)
22. Minister of National Education and Fine Arts Pierre Mulele (PSA)
23. Minister of Land Affairs Alexandre Mahamba (MNC-L)

=== Ministers of state (Note: The ministers of state held ministerial rank but no portfolios.) ===
1. Georges Grenfell (MNC-L)
2. Charles Kisolokele (ABAKO)
3. Paul Bolya (PNP/UNIMO)
4. André Ngenge (PUNA)

=== Secretaries of state ===
1. Secretary of State to the Presidency Joseph-Désiré Mobutu (MNC-L)
2. Secretary of State to the Presidency Jacques Lumbala (PNP)
3. Secretary of State for External Commerce Antoine Kiwewa (MNC-L)
4. Secretary of State for Finance André Tshibangu
5. Secretary of State for Justice Maximilien Liongo
6. Secretary of State for Foreign Affairs André Mandi
7. Secretary of State for the Interior Raphael Batshikama (ABAKO)
8. Secretary of State for Defence Albert Nyembo (CONAKAT)
9. Secretary of State for Information Antoine-Roger Bolamba (MNC-L)
10. Secretary of State for Economic Coordination and Planning Alphonse Nguvulu (PP)

== Analyses ==
The 37-strong Lumumba Government was very diverse, with its members coming from different classes, different tribes, and holding varied political beliefs. Though many had questionable loyalty to Lumumba, most did not openly contradict him out of political considerations or fear of reprisal. He dominated the Council of Ministers, and most of the ministers did respect his abilities. Of the members of the ministerial cabinet, only Kanza and Bomboko had university educations while Yav was completing his studies in Brussels. Nineteen of the ministers had worked as clerks, two as medical assistants, one as a teacher, and one other professionally in the private sector (Kanza had worked with the European Economic Community). Lumumba, Bolya, Nkayi, Rudahindwa, Nguvulu, Mandi, and Liongo were all members of the Association du Personnel Indigene de la Colonie (APIC) labour union. Fourteen of the ministers were openly left-leaning, including Gizenga, Mulele, and Gbenye. Gizenga, Mulele, Kashamura, and Bisukiro had connections with foreign leftists—mostly African nationalists—and harboured a more programmatic approach to their politics, probably due to the disaffection of farmers in their constituencies. Yav, Bomboko, and Bolamba were all known Belgian protégés, while Rudahindwa worked at the behest of the white settlers of Kivu. Nyembo used his position as Secretary of State for Defence to spy on the department's activities for Tshombe, who had secured office as the President of Katanga Province. Mandi's place as the Secretary of State for Foreign Affairs allowed him to monitor Bomboko's activities for Lumumba. As Minister of Youth and Sports, Mpolo was in a position to act as the government's primary propagandist. Charles Kisolokele was chosen to be ABAKO's minister of state because he was a practicing member of Kimbanguism (a denomination of Christianity). Lumumba probably hoped that through the appointment he could earn the allegiance of the rest of the Kimbaguist members of ABAKO, thereby dividing the party.

MNC-L members controlled eight ministries, including four major portfolios: national defence, interior, economic coordination, and agriculture. Tshombe objected to the fact that the former two were held by MNC-L members, while the majority of PUNA and MNC-K members were extremely displeased that their party leaders had not been included in the government. Lumumba failed to prevent dissidence by giving ABAKO and CONAKAT, parties both in control of regions with autonomous tendencies, a more secondary role in his government. European circles were displeased that the portfolio for economic affairs, controlled by a CONAKAT member, was undercut by the positioning of nationalists in control of the Ministry and Secretariat for Economic Coordination, and that mines and land affairs were placed under separate portfolios. Tshombe was also perturbed by the situation, and declared that it rendered his agreement to support the government "null and void". Kanza was of the opinion that Gizenga, Kabangi, Kamanga, Ngwenza, Kiwewa, Tshibangu were all well suited for their posts, while Nkayi and Ilunga were not.

== Investiture ==
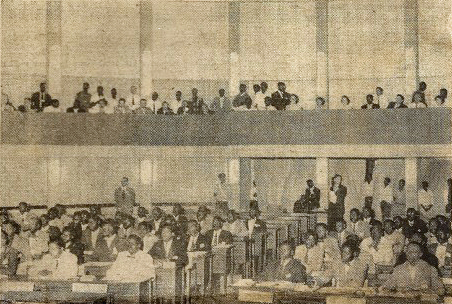
The Chamber of Deputies in session to vote on the Lumumba Government

At 22:40 on 23 June, the Chamber of Deputies convened in the Palais de la Nation to vote on Lumumba's government. After Kasongo opened the session, Lumumba delivered his main speech, promising to maintain national unity, abide by the will of the people, and pursue a neutralist foreign policy. It was warmly received by most deputies and observers. The Chamber proceeded to engage in a heated debate. Though the government contained members from parties that held 120 of the 137 seats, reaching a majority was not a straightforward task. While several leaders of the opposition had been involved in the formative negotiations, their parties as a whole had not been consulted. Furthermore, some individuals were upset they had not been included in the government and sought to personally prevent its investiture. In the subsequent arguments, multiple deputies expressed dissatisfaction at the lack of representation of their respective provinces and/or parties, with several threatening secession. Among them was Kalonji, who said he would encourage people of Kasaï to refrain from participating in the central government and form their own autonomous state. One Katangese deputy objected to the possession of the premiership and the defence portfolio by the same person.

When a vote was finally taken, only 80 of the 137 members of the Chamber were present. Of these, 74 voted in favor of the government, five against, and one abstained. The 57 absences were almost all voluntary. Though the government had earned just as many votes as when Kasongo won the presidency of the Chamber, the support was not congruent; members of Kamitatu's wing of the PSA had voted against the government while a few members of the PNP, PUNA, and ABAKO, and a single CONAKAT deputy voted in favor of it. Overall, the vote was a disappointment for the MNC-L coalition. The session was adjourned at 02:05 on 24 June.

The Senate convened that day to vote on the government. There was another heated debate, in which Iléo and Adoula expressed their strong dissatisfaction with its composition. CONAKAT members abstained from voting. When arguments concluded, a decisive vote of approval was taken on the government: 60 voted in favor, 12 against, while eight abstained. All dissident arguments for alternative cabinets, particularly Kalonji's demand for a new administration, were rendered impotent and the Lumumba Government was officially invested. With the institution of a broad coalition, the parliamentary opposition was officially reduced to only the MNC-K and some individuals. The Soviet Union was pleased by the composition of the government and made several overtures to Lumumba to try and secure his favor, while United States officials were unsure how to respond.

== Aftermath ==
=== Election of the Head of State ===
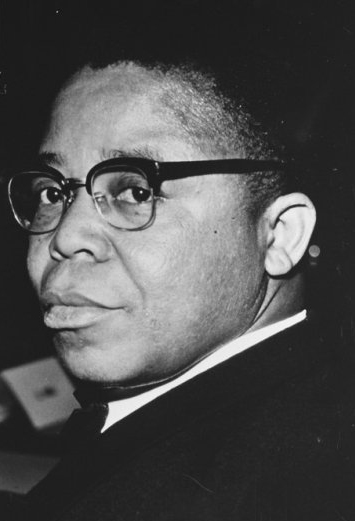
Joseph Kasa-Vubu, elected the first President of the Republic of the Congo

According to the Loi Fondementale, Parliament had to meet to elect the head of state within 48 hours of the appointments of the presiding officers of each chamber. Bolikango and Kasa-Vubu were the only two declared candidates. Lumumba had promised to support the former in the election in exchange for PUNA's support for his government's investiture. Afterwards he secretly instructed the nationalist parliamentarians to vote for Kasa-Vubu, figuring that this would please the most pressure groups and appease the ABAKO constituency, which many feared would effect a secession of the Lower Congo. Mpolo thought electing Kasa-Vubu would be a mistake and sought to postpone the vote to give Lumumba time to reconsider his decision. During the session he took the floor and suggested that, in light of heightened tensions between Bolikango's and Kasa-Vubu's supporters, the assembly be adjourned to facilitate further discussions between the political parties on their candidates of choice. Confused by the proposal, Kasongo (who was presiding) asked if it had been made on behalf of the government. Displeased, Lumumba indicated that it was not. Instead of using his power to adjourn, Kasongo deferred to the assembly, which decided to proceed with the election. Thomas Kanza coaxed Lumumba to step outside of the chamber where he, his father, and Mpolo attempted in vain to change his mind. Lumumba refused to alter his decision on the grounds that ABAKO members would revolt and that, in his personal opinion, Kasa-Vubu would make a better head of state. Kasa-Vubu won the vote, 150 to 43 with 11 abstentions.

The election of Kasa-Vubu brought about wide-ranging acceptance of the Congo's new administration. The Belgian press reacted positively to the development, while the Léopoldville's daily newspaper Courrier d'Afrique, edited by a Mukongo, showed much warmer approval of the government. However, it also solidified the oppositional alignment of PUNA, CONAKAT, and the MNC-K. Bolikango's supporters were infuriated by the result, as were many Bangala soldiers. Nevertheless, the discontent seemed to pose little threat to the Lumumba Government's operations or credibility, except in Kasai (in regard to the MNC-K). International opinion expressed satisfaction at the striking of a proper balance in leadership. Belgian politicians hoped that Kasa-Vubu would check Lumumba's impulses and personal disdain for Belgian policies. He was officially sworn in as president on 27 June.
