= Invasion of South Kasai =

Congolese military action

- Part of the Congo Crisis
Date	23 August – 23 September 1960
Location	South Kasai
Result	Congolese withdrawal
Territorial changes	Status quo ante bellum

Belligerents
(Democratic Republic of the Congo) Republic of the Congo; Supported by: Soviet Union; Czechoslovakia	South Kasai; Supported by: Belgium; Katanga

Strength
1,000–2,000 troops	200 soldiers 250 policemen Unknown number of armed civilians 240 exiles

Casualties and losses
Light	Unknown
- ~3,000 civilians killed

In August 1960 troops of the Republic of the Congo (presently Democratic Republic of the Congo) attempted to crush the secession of South Kasai by invading the declared state's territory. Though initially militarily successful, the attack faltered under intense international and domestic political scrutiny and the Congolese troops were withdrawn.

The Congo became independent in June 1960, and the following month the province of Katanga seceded from the country. As the Congo became engulfed by crisis, members of the Luba ethnic group became subject to violent attacks. In early August, Muluba politician Albert Kalonji declared the secession of South Kasai, a region just north of Katanga, with the aim of creating a Baluba-dominated state. The Congolese central government, led by Prime Minister Patrice Lumumba, resolved to put down the secessions by force. As South Kasai controlled railway junctions critical for an attack against Katanga, the Congolese forces decided to target South Kasai first. Lumumba ordered the offensive to commence, though who planned it and led it is disputed. On 23 August troops of the Armée Nationale Congolaise (ANC) began advancing upon South Kasai. They penetrated the border the following day, facing only minimal resistance from the poorly-armed South Kasain army and police—which quickly retreated—and local Baluba militia. Kalonji fled to Katanga, and the ANC seized Bakwanga, the secessionist capital, on 26 August. The ANC then came into conflict with local Baluba civilians. Both sides perpetrated atrocities, with the ANC committing several massacres, resulting in the deaths of about 3,000 civilians. In Katanga, Kalonji organised a new army to retake South Kasai. Their counter-offensive was halted by the ANC, though the Kasaian troops and Katangese forces successfully blunted ANC incursions into Katanga.

The massacres in Bakwanga provoked international condemnation, with United Nations Secretary General Dag Hammarskjöld commenting that they amounted to "a case of incipient genocide". On 5 September Congolese President Joseph Kasa-Vubu declared that Lumumba had "plunged the nation into fratricidal war" and dismissed him from the premiership. A political deadlock ensued, leading ANC Chief of Staff Joseph-Désiré Mobutu to launch a coup and seize control of the central government. On 18 September Mobutu agreed with UN officials to end the fighting, and the ANC withdrew from South Kasai six days later. The territory remained in secession until 1962 when Kalonji was overthrown and the ANC occupied it. No evidence has since been provided to suggest that the ANC massacres in Bakwanga met the legal definitions of genocide.

== Background ==
=== Decolonisation of the Belgian Congo ===
European colonial rule in the Congo began in the late 19th century. King Leopold II of Belgium, frustrated by his country's lack of international power and prestige, attempted to persuade the Belgian government to support colonial expansion around the then-largely unexplored Congo Basin. The Belgian government's ambivalence about the idea led Leopold to eventually create the colony on his own account. With support from a number of Western countries, who viewed Leopold as a useful buffer between rival colonial powers, Leopold achieved international recognition for a personal colony, the Congo Free State, in 1885. The Luba Empire, the largest regional power in the Kasai region, was annexed into the new state in 1889. By the turn of the century, the violence of Free State officials against indigenous Congolese and the ruthless system of economic extraction had led to intense diplomatic pressure on Belgium to take official control of the country, which it did in 1908, creating the Belgian Congo.

An anti-colonial Pan-African and nationalist movement developed in the Belgian Congo during the 1950s, primarily among the évolué class (the urbanised black bourgeoisie). The movement was divided into a number of parties and groups which were broadly divided on ethnic and geographical lines and opposed to one another. The largest, the Mouvement National Congolais (MNC), was a united front organisation dedicated to achieving independence "within a reasonable" time. It was created around a charter which was signed by, among others, Patrice Lumumba, Cyrille Adoula and Joseph Ileo. Lumumba became a leading figure and by the end of 1959, the party claimed to have 58,000 members. However, many found the MNC was too moderate. A number of other parties emerged, distinguished by their radicalism, support for federalism or centralism and affiliation to certain ethnic groupings. The MNC's main rival was the Alliance des Bakongo (ABAKO) led by Joseph Kasa-Vubu, a more radical party supported among the Kongo people in the north, and Moise Tshombe's Confédération des Associations Tribales du Katanga (CONAKAT), a strongly federalist party in the southern Katanga Province.

Although it was the largest of the African nationalist parties, the MNC had many different factions within it that took differing stances on a number of issues. It was increasingly polarised between moderate évolués and the more radical mass membership. A radical and federalist faction headed by Ileo and Albert Kalonji split away in July 1959, but failed to induce mass defections by other MNC members. The dissident faction became known as the MNC-Kalonji (MNC-K), while the majority group became the MNC-Lumumba (MNC-L). The split divided the party's support base into those who endured with Lumumba, chiefly in the Stanleyville region in the north-east, and those who backed the MNC-K, popular in the south and among Kalonji's own ethnic group, the Baluba.

=== Situation in Kasai ===
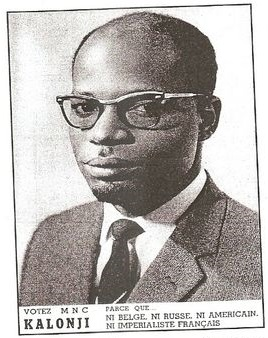
Albert Kalonji MNC-K campaign poster for the 1960 elections

One of the major legacies of colonial rule in Kasai was the arbitrary redivision of the population into new ethnic groups. Despite the shared language (Tshiluba) and culture of the two groups, colonial administrators believed the inhabitants of the Lulua river area to be ethnically different from the Baluba and dubbed them the Bena Lulua. The colonists believed the Baluba to be more intelligent, hardworking and open to new ideas than the Bena Lulua who were believed to be more reactionary and stupid. As a result, from the 1930s, the state began to treat the two groups differently and applied different policies to each and promoted the Baluba to positions above other ethnicities.

During the 1950s the Belgians began to fear that the rise of a powerful Luba elite would become a threat to colonial rule, and the administration began to support Lulua organisations. This further contributed to the growing ethnic polarisation between the two groups. In 1959, Luba-Lulua animosity was brought to a head by the discovery of a colonial proposal to move Luba farmers out of Lulua land to the less fertile land on Luba territory. As a result, hostility increased and violent clashes broke out. In August 1959, Luba demonstrations against the plan were violently repressed by the colonial military and police.

As independence approached, the Belgian government organised Congolese elections in May 1960. These resulted in an MNC-L relative majority. Nationally, Kasa-Vubu was proclaimed President, and Lumumba Prime Minister. In Kasai Province, the 1960 elections degenerated into an "anti-Baluba plebiscite" as the Luba MNC-K succeeded in obtaining a plurality but failed to take control of the provincial government. Instead, Lumumba promoted a Lulua candidate, Barthélemy Mukenge, as provincial president while Kalonji was denied an important ministerial portfolio in Lumumba's government. Kalonji refused Lumumba's offer of the Agriculture portfolio. The Kalonjists, who felt rejected and marginalised by the central government, began supporting alternative parties. Among them, the Kalonjists supported Tshombe's CONAKAT party in nearby Katanga which, because of its strongly federalist stance, opposed to Lumumba's conception of a strong central government based in the capital Léopoldville. As part of this, the Kalonjists backed CONAKAT at the expense of their main local rivals, the Association Générale des Baluba du Katanga (BALUBAKAT) party led by Jason Sendwe, which, although it represented the Baluba of Katanga Province, was in favour of centralism. The Kalonjists, who believed themselves to be acting on behalf of all the Luba-Kasai, created an animosity between the Luba-Kasai and the Luba-Katanga but also failed to gain the full support of CONAKAT, much of which had racial prejudice against the Baluba and supported only the "authentic Katangese".

=== Congo Crisis ===
Map of the factions in the Congo in 1961; South Kasai is coloured yellow and Katanga is coloured green.

The Belgian Congo became independent as the Republic of the Congo on 30 June 1960 in relative peace. On 5 July the Léopoldville garrison of the Armée Nationale Congolaise (ANC)—formerly the Force Publique—mutinied in protest of poor working conditions and lack of material advancement following independence, and the revolt quickly spread throughout the Lower Congo. On 8 July the government implemented several reforms, including the promotion of Victor Lundula to general and commander of the army and making Secretary of State Joseph-Désiré Mobutu colonel and army chief of staff. Two days later the Belgian government initiated a unilateral military intervention to protect its citizens and in the following days Belgian troops occupied numerous towns throughout the Congo, particularly in Katanga. On 11 July Tshombe declared that Katanga, in opposition to "the arbitrary and neo-communist will of the central government", was seceding from the Congo.

On 14 July Lumumba and Kasa-Vubu sent a telegram to the United Nations (UN), stating that peacekeepers were requested to guard the Congo's sovereignty against Belgian aggression and warning that if the request was not speedily fulfilled they would turn to the Bandung Powers for assistance. The following day they sent a message to Soviet Premier Nikita Khrushchev from Kindu, asking that he monitor the situation in the Congo closely. In New York City the UN Security Council adopted UNSC Resolution 143, calling upon Belgium to withdraw its troops and authorising the Secretary-General to send military and technical assistance to the Congo in consultation with the government to restore law and order. This resulted in the establishment of a large UN multinational peacekeeping force (generally known by its French acronym of ONUC). Foreign contingents arrived in the capital shortly thereafter. UN Secretary General Dag Hammarskjöld later stated that these were to form a "temporary security force" that, although acting with the consent of and performing some of the tasks of the government, was completely under UN command.

Meanwhile in the same period of time, Baluba throughout Katanga and Kasai became the subject of violent attacks. Kalonji and his allies made an official call to the Baluba across the Congo to return to their "homeland" in the southern portion of the province on 14 July. Initially, they envisaged the division of Kasai in two in order to allow for the creation of a quasi-autonomous MNC-K and Luba-dominated provincial government. Rapidly, however, Kalonji realised that the chaos in the rest of the Congo could be used to secede unilaterally and declare full local independence. On 9 August 1960, Kalonji declared the region of south-eastern Kasai to be the new Autonomous State of South Kasai (État autonome du Sud-Kasaï). South Kasai's secession was supported by Belgian corporate interests, chiefly the Forminière mining company.

== Prelude ==
When South Kasai seceded, ANC troops were already fighting Katangese troops in the Kasai region. The arrival of the ONUC contingents was initially welcomed by Lumumba and the central government who believed the UN would help suppress the secessionist states. ONUC's initial mandate, however, only covered the maintenance of law and order. Viewing the secessions as an internal political matter, Hammarskjöld refused to permit UN troops to assist the central Congolese government in its campaign against them; he argued that doing so would represent a loss of impartiality and breach Congolese sovereignty. Lumumba requested that ONUC personnel stop disarming disorderly Congolese soldiers, saying he would need an armed force if the UN would not help him. With the UN refusing to take action against the secessions, Lumumba decided that his government would have to reintegrate South Kasai and Katanga on its own. South Kasai held important railway junctions needed by the Congolese army for a campaign against Katanga, and therefore became an important objective. It also had important mineral wealth which the Congolese government was anxious to return to its jurisdiction.

Sources differ on who planned the Congolese offensive. According to Minister-Delegate to the United Nations Thomas Kanza, the plan detailing the invasions of South Kasai and Katanga by the ANC was put together in the Prime Minister's office in consultation with General Lundula, Minister of Interior Christophe Gbenye, Minister of State Georges Grenfell, and Secretary of State to the Presidency Marcel Lengema. Kanza stated that Colonel Mobutu only made a limited contribution to the discussions. According to biographer Robin McKown, the plan was conceived by Colonel Mobutu. Political scientist Catherine Hoskyns wrote that operation was drawn up by both Mobutu and Lundula. Journalist Pierre Davister reported that Mobutu had once boasted to him that he planned the operation by himself. Secretary of State to the Presidency Jacques Lumbala later claimed responsibility for the offensive.

According to the plan, troops were to be dispatched to Kivu and northern Kasai. Those in the former region were to head south into northern Katanga under Sendwe and Minister of Justice Rémy Mwamba to support the local Baluba in waging a guerrilla campaign against Tshombe's government. The units in the latter area would neutralise South Kasai before heading east and attacking Katanga; one ANC detachment would advance from Luluabourg to Bakwanga and secure the city, while another would move down the rail line and occupy Kaniama.

All Sabena aircraft in the Congo were requisitioned by the government for the offensive. As Soviet diplomats had made tentative offers of support Lumumba, he requested the procurement of additional transport for the ANC. In response the Soviet Union loaned Lumumba 16 Ilyushin transport aircraft and their crews (with one additional Ilyushin for Lumumba's personal use) and diverted a number of trucks initially destined for ONUC detachments to the Kasai region. No provision was made for additional supplies for the forces. The amount of Soviet trucks and planes which were actually used by the ANC in Kasai is unknown. About 1,000 Soviet military advisers and three from Czechoslovakia were sent in to provide technical assistance. Ghanaian officials in Léopoldville, particularly Ambassador Andrew Djin and General Stephen Otu, warned Lumumba and ANC commanders that an invasion of South Kasai and Katanga would not succeed and that the use of Soviet aid would have severe political consequences. Despite their advice, Lumumba carried on with preparations for the offensive and, hoping to rally African support behind his decision, continued arranging for the holding of a Pan-African Conference in Léopoldville.

== Invasion ==
=== Early operations ===
The central government's assault to retake South Kasai began on 23 August. Sources differ on who commanded the offensive. According political scientist Jean-Claude Willame, it was led by Léopold Nzulu, the former commander of the ANC garrison at Thysville. According to Royal Museum for Central Africa, the ANC was led by three men: Joseph-Damien Tshatshi, Léonard Loso, and Clément Somao. A vanguard of ANC troops from Léopoldville were flown into the Kasai region and, reinforced by the Luluabourg garrison, began advancing on South Kasai. Approximately 1,000–2,000 ANC troops participated. They were accompanied by Lumbala and Jacques Omonombe, an officer of the Sûreté Nationale. The direct attack on Katanga from Kivu was postponed.

On the evening of 24 August Kalonji departed for Katanga, pledging to his ministers that he would request aid from Tshombe. ANC troops entered South Kasaian territory that night. They were opposed by 200 South Kasai soldiers and 250 policemen. The soldiers had little training and were equipped with arms left behind by Belgian troops. These quickly retreated, though the ANC faced the opposition of local Baluba militia, most of whom were only armed with handmade single-shot rifles called nkonga. The ANC occupied Bakwanga largely without incident on 26 August, and took up temporary residence in Forminière's corporate building. South Kasaian troops fled toward the Katangese border. The next day Kalonji announced the surrender of the city from Élisabethville, the capital of Katanga.

When government troops arrived in Bakwanga, they released Lulua tribesmen from prison, while Lumbala and Omonombe organised the arrest of South Kasaian political figures. Lacking supplies and adequate transportation, ANC soldiers began requisitioning civilian vehicles and seizing food from the locals in preparation for an advance on Katanga. When David Odia, the South Kasai Minister of Public Works, protested, soldiers beat him and fatally injured him. Many Baluba first fled the scene in terror, but returned on 29 August with home-made shotguns to resist. Vastly outgunned, many Baluba were killed in the ensuing fighting. ANC soldiers then perpetrated a series of massacres against the local Baluba. One group of civilians sheltering at the St. Jean de Bakwa Church in Nyanguila were shot with machine guns. Both sides committed several atrocities, including the mutilation of corpses, rape, arson, and robbery. The small Tunisian ONUC detachment in Bakwanga were unable to contain the violence and were relegated to guarding a building where the city's European population had taken refuge. Red Cross Representative in the Congo G. C. Senn criticized the UN for its lack of more direct action, arguing that it was too afraid of upsetting political figures. International observers reported the deaths of hundreds of Baluba on 29 and 30 August. On 30 August Joseph Nkongolo, the Catholic Bishop of Luebo, was arrested by the ANC in Bakwanga on a Sûreté warrant. He was freed the following day after Mukenge intervened. Gerard Cravatte, the general manager of the Société minière du Bécéka, was detained for five days before being freed on the request of the Luxembourgish consul, as he was a citizen of Luxembourg.

Following the death of Odia and the first clashes in Bakwanga, residents from surrounding villages sought refuge in the environs of the Bakwanga Hospital and the Saint-Jean-Baptiste de Bonzola Cathedral. On 31 August some Kalonjist militiamen hiding in a nearby Société minière du Bécéka building opened fire on an ANC column, killing three soldiers. When the Congolese troops began to search the area for the source of the firing, they discovered the sheltering locals and shot many of them. Wounded South Kasaian soldiers were dragged out of the hospital and killed. The survivors fled to Kasengulu, a village 15 kilometres outside of Bakwanga, where many were killed by pursuing ANC forces. Around 3,000 civilians were ultimately killed in South Kasai. The violence of the advance caused an exodus of many thousands of Baluba who fled their homes to escape the fighting; more than 35,000 went to refugee camps in Élisabethville alone. The South Kasian government collapsed as most of its members fled into exile.

=== Contemporaneous political events ===
While the operation was underway, Lumumba sought African support for the anti-secessionist campaign and proceeded with the Pan-African Conference in Léopoldville. Representatives from 13 independent countries and four nationalist movements attended. The opening of the conference on the morning of 25 August was marred by large demonstrations from opposition supporters outside the meeting hall. Police fired into the air to disperse the crowd, inciting panic and greatly disturbing the foreign delegations. In his opening speech, Lumumba spoke broadly and appealed to African unity. Almost all of the delegations recommended that the offensive be halted and that the Congolese government mend its relations with the UN. Lumumba was disappointed by their attitude and realised that he would not be able to secure their military support and that rapprochement with the UN was necessary. Nevertheless, he was not dissuaded from pursuing the South Kasai–Katanga offensive; on 27 August he flew to Stanleyville to rally reinforcements for the campaign. To forestall advances into their own territory, the Katangese Gendarmerie demolished road and rail links between South Kasai and Katanga.

=== Continued fighting and South Kasaian counterattack ===
In Élisabethville, Kalonji took up residence in a cottage near Tshombe's presidential palace and established a new crisis government. He appealed for Katangese assistance. Some Katangese leaders, such as Minister of Interior Godefroid Munongo, regarded the Kasai Baluba as enemies. Tshombe criticised Kalonji for not remaining in Bakwanga to rally support against the invasion. Kalonji then appealed to the Union Minière du Haut-Katanga, a large mining corporation based in Katanga, arguing that South Kasai served as a useful buffer between the ANC and Katanga. Ultimately he secured the support he needed to found an army-in-exile consisting of 240 to 600 men, most of them recruited from Kasaian immigrant workers in Katanga and led by foreign mercenaries. He also encouraged the South Kasian population to resist Congolese central government occupation in radio broadcasts. In light of the success of the ANC in Kasai, Tshombe feared a direct attack on Katanga. Both he and Kalonji reached out to Kasa-Vubu to end the fighting, and in response Kasa-Vubu dispatched an ABAKO delegation to Élisabethville to meet with them.

Lumbala returned to Léopoldville on 1 September and delivered a report on the campaign to Lumumba, exaggerating his own role in the invasion and the extent of resistance. That day Colonel Mobutu—fearing the ANC would falter due to renewed military opposition and logistical challenges—ordered an end to the campaign without consulting the government. The order led to an argument between Lumumba and Mobutu in which the prime minister threatened to fire the colonel. Nevertheless, fighting continued. The Tunisian peacekeepers stepped up their efforts to maintain order, convincing some ANC units to stop committing atrocities and disarming some belligerents. They also continued to protect the Europeans, buried corpses, tended to the wounded, and escorted World Health Organization doctors around the area. They reported that in early September the situation had "somewhat ameliorated and should gradually improve." On 4 September an American journalist—the son of diplomat Henry J. Taylor—was shot and killed while observing fighting between the ANC and Baluba militiamen. Around the same time Congolese reinforcements were flown into the region from Stanleyville and ANC troops also began probing the Katangese border. Kalonji ordered his army-in-exile to retake the town of Luputa. Upon reentering South Kasai the Kalonjist forces murdered civilians and looted villages. The ANC ambushed and destroyed the column when it arrived in Luputa. Kalonji's other forces, together with the Katangese Gendarmerie, successfully defeated ANC incursions into Katanga.

=== Dismissal of Lumumba and Congolese withdrawal ===
On the evening of 5 September, Kasa-Vubu declared over radio that Lumumba had "plunged the nation into fratricidal war" and was dismissing him from the premiership. He stated that several other members of the government were dismissed and that Joseph Iléo would form a new government. Shortly thereafter, Lumumba broadcast a message denouncing Kasa-Vubu's action and declaring that he was deposed. The following day ONUC closed all Congolese airports to "civilian"—or non-United Nations—air traffic, with the aim of preventing Lumumba from moving troops into the capital or sending additional forces into Kasai.

On 7 September the Chamber of Deputies convened to discuss Kasa-Vubu's dismissal order. Responding to an interpellation concerning the campaign in South Kasai, Lumumba denied that he had ordered any mass killings and blamed the Belgian colonial administration for inflaming the Lulua-Baluba conflict. He also announced that the government had seized several Belgian and French aircraft in Luluabourg carrying arms destined for Bakwanga. The Chamber voted to annul both Kasa-Vubu's and Lumumba's declarations of dismissal, and the next day the Senate delivered the government a vote of confidence. Over the next few days little activity was undertaken by Parliament or the Council of Ministers. Lumumba declared himself to still be the legal Prime Minister and continued to exercise his powers and press on with the military campaign against South Kasai. Iléo proclaimed his completed government on 10 September. On 13 September Parliament convened in a joint session to discuss the political impasse. Lumumba appealed to them to grant him "full powers" to manage the country's crisis but assured that he was ready to seek an understanding with rival political factions. Parliament passed a resolution in accordance with Lumumba's wishes but also established a commission to oversee the government's implementation of the powers. However, the authenticity and legality of the vote was questionable.

On 14 September, Mobutu announced over the radio that he was launching a "peaceful revolution" to break the political impasse and therefore neutralising the President, Lumumba's and Iléo's respective governments, and suspending Parliament until 31 December. He stated that "technicians" would run the administration while the politicians sorted out their differences. He also ordered all Soviet military advisers to leave the country. In a subsequent press conference he clarified that Congolese university graduates would be asked to form a government. Lumumba and Kasa-Vubu were both surprised by the coup. On 17 September ANC soldiers from Stanleyville began an attack from Kivu into northern Katanga and occupied some territory after minimal fighting. The following day Mobutu, after discussion with UN officials, agreed to terminate the ANC campaign against Katanga and South Kasai, and on 23 September the troops were withdrawn in ONUC aircraft. ONUC subsequently created a buffer zone between ANC troops and the Katanga border. ANC casualties from the invasion were light.

== Aftermath ==
=== Political ramifications ===
"[The actions of the ANC in South Kasai] involve a most flagrant violation of elementary human rights and have the characteristics of the crime of genocide since they appear to be directed towards the extermination of a specific ethnic group, the Balubas [sic]."

— Dag Hammarskjöld, UN Secretary-General, September 1960

Hammarskjöld found the atrocities in South Kasai to be "a case of incipient genocide" and believed that Lumumba, having given the orders to commence the offensive in an "almost casual manner", had lost all sense of responsibility. He ordered ONUC contingents to intervene to prevent future massacres, but this proved unnecessary as the situation calmed in September. The American press depicted the Prime Minister's regime as a Soviet puppet and dependent on Soviet aid. The British press offered extensive coverage of the atrocities in Bakwanga, which shocked the British public. Western opinion held Lumumba at fault for the killings. The violence and ultimate failure of the anti-secessionist push greatly damaged the government's reputation. The use of Soviet aide led the many figures of the United States government to conclude that the Congo was falling into a communist orbit.

Following the ANC withdrawal, Kalonji returned to Bakwanga and set about reestablishing his government. This was facilitated by ONUC's failure to respond quickly enough to a central government request for the establishment of a neutral zone in South Kasai. Kalonji dispensed patronage to the local tribal leaders who had supported his cause while he was absent. He also denounced Lumumba as "a murderer who must be tried and executed". Kalonji's forces reoccupied South Kasai and undertook a campaign of repression against the Basonga and Kanyok ethnic minorities. In the aftermath of the ANC invasion, the South Kasaian state was able to provide substantial aid to its refugees, many of whom were resettled in homes and jobs. Nevertheless, the offensive caused considerable disruption to law and order and the local economy; by December 1960 the number of diamonds cut by Forminière and the number of people it employed both had fallen by thousands. Food shortages, brought on by disruptions to agriculture, also led to hundreds of deaths from starvation among the refugees.

The South Kasaian state co-existed with the rest of the Congo for some time. Congolese delegates, as well as ANC and ONUC troops were generally able to move around the territory without conflict with the South Kasaian authorities while their sporadic campaign against Katangese forces continued. In February 1961 Kalonji ordered the execution of several captive former Congolese officials, including Lumbala, as revenge for the ANC massacres in Bakwanga. South Kasai remained in secession until late 1962 when a central government-sponsored military coup overthrew Kalonji and the ANC occupied the territory, allowing for its re-integration into the Congo.

=== Legacy ===
Though there has been little study of the ANC atrocities in South Kasai, no information has ever been presented to corroborate the notion that Lumumba or other officials intended to eliminate certain populations in accordance to legal definitions of "genocide"; the use of the term "genocide" was primarily a rhetorical device meant to damage his reputation. Lumumba's image was unpopular in southern Kasai for years after his death, as many Baluba remained mindful that he had ordered the military campaign that resulted in the atrocities against their people. Congolese artist Tshibumba Kanda-Matulu painted a depiction of the fighting between the Baluba and the ANC for his series on Congolese history.

== Bibliography ==
- Artigue, Pierre (1961). Qui sont les leaders congolais? (in French). Brussels: Éditions Europe-Afrique. OCLC 716980193.
- Bowett, D. W.; Barton, G. P. (2008). United Nations Forces: A Legal Study (reprint ed.). Clark, New Jersey: The Lawbook Exchange. ISBN 9781584777151.
- Bring, Ove (2003). "Dag Hammarskjöld and the Issue of Humanitarian Intervention". Nordic Cosmopolitanism: Essays in International Law for Martti Koskenniemi (illustrated ed.). Boston: Martinus Nijhoff Publishers. ISBN 9789004136168.
- Bring, Ove (2011). "Hammarskjöld's approach to the United Nations and international law" (PDF). Estudios Internacionales. Documentos. 44 (170): 159–172. ISSN 0716-0240. JSTOR 41969371.
- Fabian, Johannes (1996). Remembering the Present: Painting and Popular History in Zaire. Berkeley: University of California Press. ISBN 9780520917323.
- Freund, Bill (1998). The Making of Contemporary Africa: The Development of African Society since 1800 (2nd ed.). Basingstoke: Palgrave-Macmillan. ISBN 978-0-333-69872-3.
- Gibbs, David N. (1991). The Political Economy of Third World Intervention: Mines, Money, and U.S. Policy in the Congo Crisis. American Politics and Political Economy. Chicago: University of Chicago Press. ISBN 978-0-226-29071-3.
- Haskin, Jeanne M. (2005). The Tragic State of the Congo: From Decolonization to Dictatorship. New York City: Algora Publishing. ISBN 0-87586-416-3.
- Hoskyns, Catherine (1965). The Congo Since Independence: January 1960 – December 1961. London: Oxford University Press. OCLC 414961.
- Kanza, Thomas R. (1994). The Rise and Fall of Patrice Lumumba: Conflict in the Congo (expanded ed.). Rochester, VT: Schenkman Books. ISBN 978-0-87073-901-9.
- Lefever, Ernest W.; Joshua, Wynfred (30 June 1966). United Nations Peacekeeping in the Congo: 1960–1964 (PDF). Vol. 2. Washington, D.C.: Brookings Institution. OCLC 631685344. Archived from the original (PDF) on April 23, 2017.
- McKown, Robin (1969). Lumumba: A Biography. Garden City, New York: Doubleday. OCLC 977145530.
- Merriam, Alan P. (1961). Congo: Background of Conflict. Evanston, IL: Northwestern University Press. OCLC 424186.
- Mockaitis, Thomas R. (1999). Peace Operations and Intrastate Conflict: The Sword Or the Olive Branch? (illustrated ed.). Westport, CT: Greenwood Publishing Group. ISBN 978-0-275-96173-2.
- Namikas, Lise (2013). Battleground Africa: Cold War in the Congo, 1960–1965. Washington, DC: Woodrow Wilson Center Press. ISBN 978-0-8047-8486-3.
- Nzongola-Ntalaja, Georges (2007). The Congo, From Leopold to Kabila: A People's History (3rd ed.). New York: Palgrave. ISBN 978-1-84277-053-5.
- Olorunsola, Victor A. (1972). The Politics of Cultural Sub-nationalism in Africa. Garden City, New York: Anchor Books. OCLC 915692187.
- Omasombo Tshonda, Jean, ed. (2014). Kasaï-Oriental : Un nœud gordien dans l'espace congolais (PDF). Provinces (in French). Tervuren: Royal Museum for Central Africa. ISBN 978-9-4916-1524-5.
- Othen, Christopher (2015). Katanga 1960–63: Mercenaries, Spies and the African Nation that Waged War on the World (illustrated ed.). Stroud: The History Press. ISBN 978-0-7509-6580-4.
- Packham, Eric S. (1996). Freedom and Anarchy. New York: Nova Science. ISBN 1-56072-232-0.
- Pakenham, Thomas (1992). The Scramble for Africa: the White Man's Conquest of the Dark Continent from 1876 to 1912 (13th ed.). London: Abacus. ISBN 978-0-349-10449-2.
- Reid, Stuart A. (2023). The Lumumba Plot. New York: Alfred A. Knopf. ISBN 9781524748814.
- Rich, Jeremy (2020). Protestant Missionaries & Humanitarianism in the DRC: The Politics of Aid in Cold War Africa. Boydell & Brewer. ISBN 9781847012586.
- Stapleton, Timothy J. (2017). A History of Genocide in Africa. ABC-CLIO. ISBN 9781440830525.
- Traugott, Mark (1976). Rebellion in the Kwilu: Case Study in the Analysis of Agrarian Social Movements (PhD thesis). Berkeley, CA: University of California. OCLC 949648336.
- Willame, Jean-Claude (1990). Patrice Lumumba: la crise congolaise revisitée (in French). Paris: Éditions Karthala. ISBN 9782865372706.
- de Witte, Ludo (2002). The Assassination of Lumumba (illustrated ed.). London: Verso. ISBN 978-1-85984-410-6.
- Zeilig, Leo (2008). Lumumba: Africa's Lost Leader. London: Haus. ISBN 978-1-905791-02-6.
