= Tshibangu =

Tshibangu is a Congolese surname. Notable people with the surname include:

- André Tshibangu, Congolese politician
- Isaac Tshibangu (born 2003), Congolese footballer
- Zacharie Tshimanga Wa Tshibangu (born 1941), Congolese historian and writer
