= Palais de la Nation =

Palais de la Nation is a French term, translating as "Palace of the Nation", which may refer to:

- The Belgian Federal Parliament building, Brussels, Belgium
- The Palais de la Nation (Kinshasa), the residence of the President of the Democratic Republic of the Congo
