= André Ngenge =

Congolese politician

- Born: Democratic Republic of the Congo
- Occupation: Politician

André Ngenge was a Congolese politician. He was appointed as one of the first Ministers of State of Zaire, now the Democratic Republic of the Congo, under the Lumumba Government that ran from 24 June until 12 September 1960.

He was the member of PUNA.

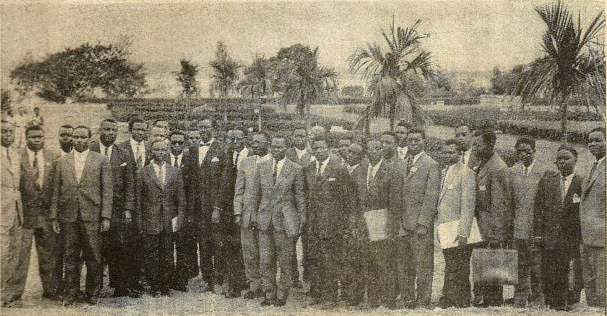
Patrice Lumumba (left center) with his first government outside the Palais de la Nation soon after swearing-in ceremony
