= Antoine Ngwenza =

Congolese politician

- Born: Democratic Republic of the Congo
- Occupation: Politician

Antoine Ngwenza was a Congolese politician. He was appointed as the first Minister of Social Affairs of Zaire, now the Democratic Republic of the Congo, under Lumumba Government that ran from 24 June until 12 September 1960 under the leadership of Prime Minister Patrice Lumumba. He was the member of PUNA.

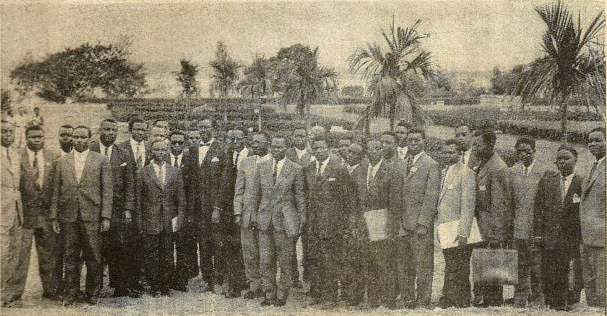
Patrice Lumumba (left center) with his first government outside the Palais de la Nation soon after swearing-in ceremony
