= 1960 Belgian Congo general election =

Election in Belgian colony

- 22 May 1960

All 137 seats in the National Assembly 69 seats needed for a majority
- Registered: 3,390,940
- Turnout: 81.79%
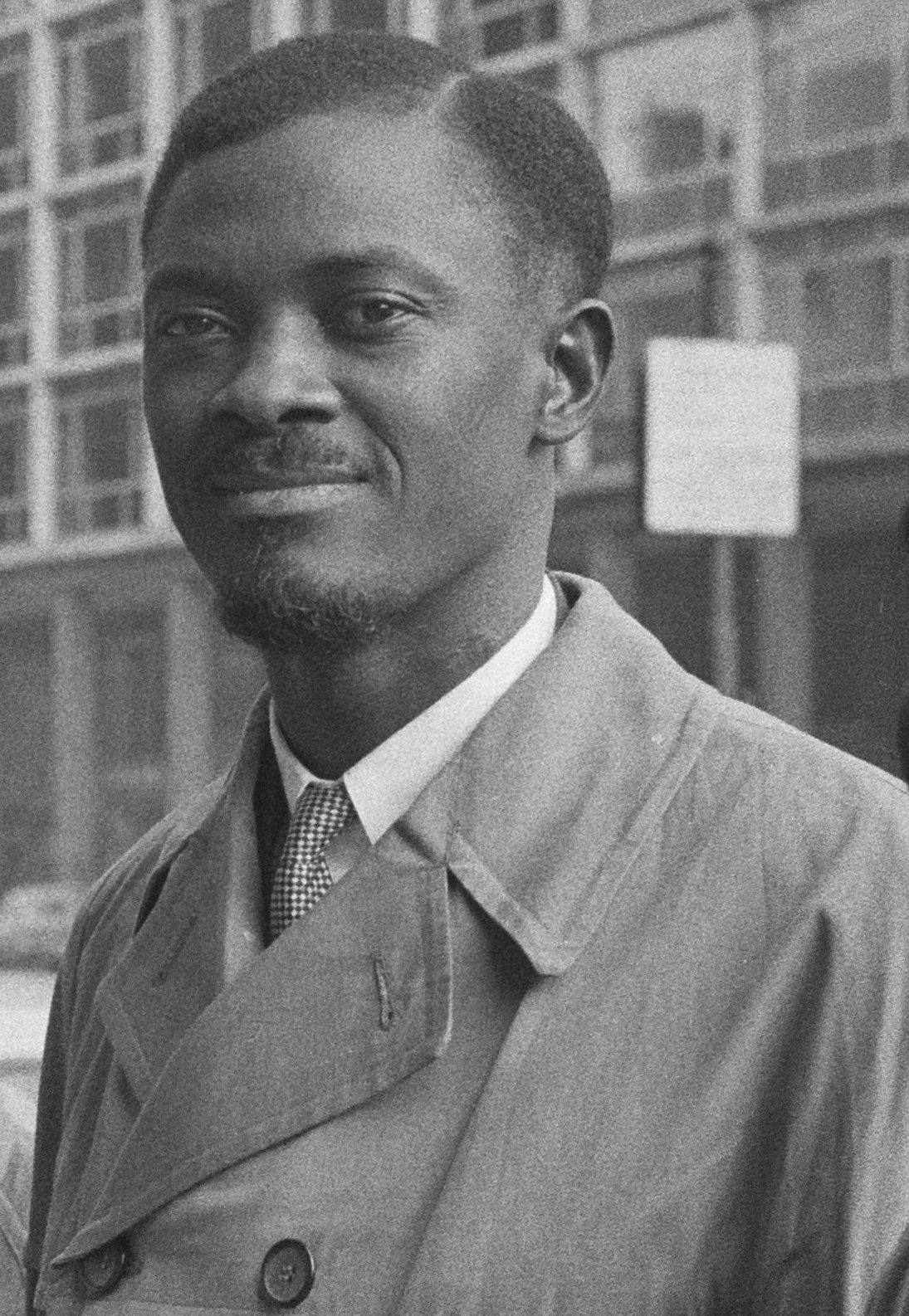

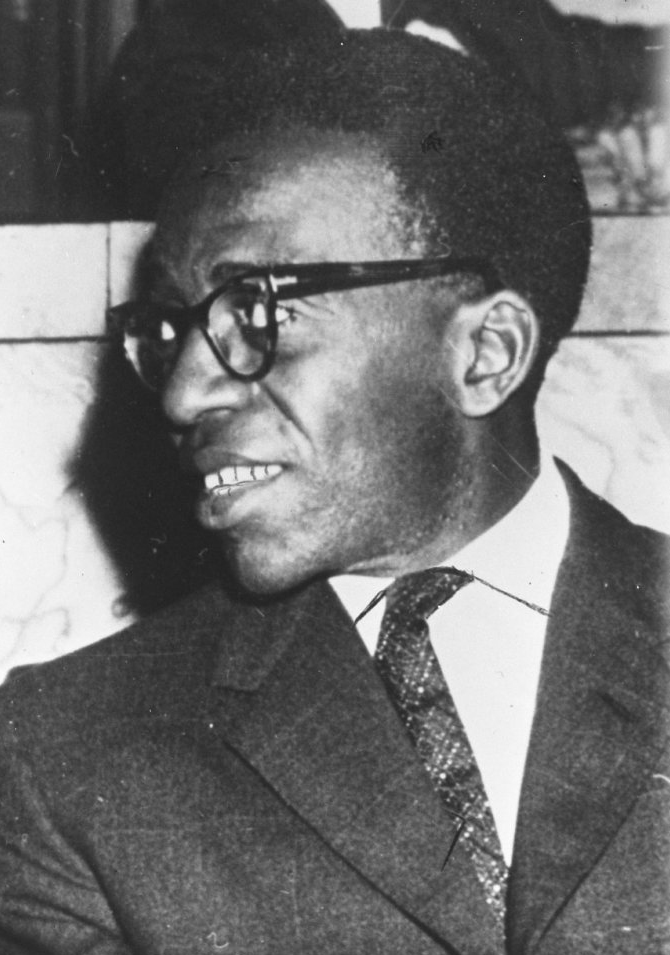

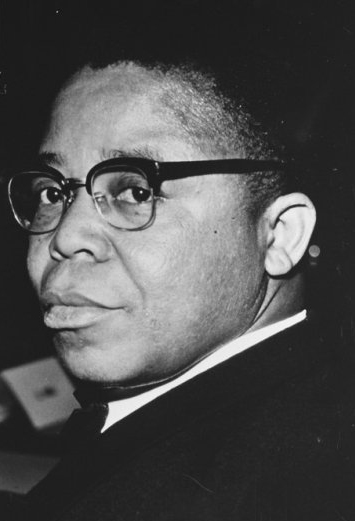
	First party	Second party	Third party
Leader	Patrice Lumumba	Antoine Gizenga	Joseph Kasa-Vubu
Party	MNC-Lumumba	PSA	ABAKO
Seats won	33	13	12
Popular vote	521,187	278,971	210,542
Percentage	23.44%	12.54%	9.47%
Elected Prime Minister
Patrice Lumumba
MNC-Lumumba

General elections were held in the Belgian Congo on 22 May 1960, in order to create a government to rule the country following independence as the Republic of the Congo (Congo-Léopoldville), scheduled for 30 June. The 137-seat Chamber of Deputies was elected by men over the age of 21. The seats were filled by district-based lists, although only two parties, the Mouvement National Congolais-Lumumba (MNC-L) and the Parti National du Progrès, submitted lists in more than one district.

The MNC-L, led by Patrice Lumumba, won the most seats and Lumumba was confirmed as prime minister by Parliament after forming a coalition that included the Parti Solidaire Africain, Centre de Regroupment Africain and other parties. Voter turnout was 82%.

Following the election, an 84-seat Senate was elected by Provincial Assembly members, and the two chambers elected Joseph Kasa-Vubu of ABAKO as president after some days of turmoil.

== Background ==
=== Belgian rule of the Congo ===
Map of Africa with the Democratic Republic of the Congo's modern borders

Colonial rule in the Congo began in the late 19th century. King Leopold II of Belgium, frustrated by Belgium's lack of international power and prestige, attempted to persuade the Belgian government to support colonial expansion around the largely unexplored Congo Basin. The Belgian government's ambivalence about the idea led Leopold to eventually create a state on his own account, achieving international recognition for the Congo Free State in 1885. By the turn of the century, however, the violence of Free State officials against indigenous Congolese and the ruthless system of economic extraction had led to intense diplomatic pressure on Belgium to take official control of the country, which it did in 1908, creating the Belgian Congo. The colony was divided into six provinces: Léopoldville, Équateur, Orientale, Kivu, Kasaï, and Katanga. The city of Léopoldville was designated as the capital in 1923.

Belgian rule in the Congo was based around the "colonial trinity" (trinité coloniale) of state, missionary and private company interests. The privileging of Belgian commercial interests meant that capital sometimes flowed back into the Congo and that individual regions became specialised. The country was split into nesting, hierarchically organised administrative subdivisions, and run uniformly according to a set "native policy" (politique indigène). As early as the 1920s, the Congo possessed one of the densest colonial regimes in Africa. The administration was heavily involved in the life of the Congolese; Belgian functionaries (government civil servants) closely monitored and enforced agricultural production, provided medical services to many residents, and frequently toured even the most rural territories to oversee their subjects. There was also a high degree of racial segregation between the native and white populations, the latter of which grew considerably after the end of World War II due to immigration from Europe.

=== Rise in Congolese political activity ===
During the latter stages of World War II a new social stratum emerged in the Congo, known as the évolués. Forming an African middle class in the colony, they held skilled positions (such as clerks and nurses) made available by the economic boom. While there were no universal criteria for determining évolué status, it was generally accepted that one would have "a good knowledge of French, adhere to Christianity, and have some form of post-primary education." Early on in their history, most évolués sought to use their unique status to earn special privileges in the Congo. Since opportunities for upward mobility through the colonial structure were limited, the évolué class institutionally manifested itself in elite clubs through which they could enjoy trivial privileges that made them feel distinct from the Congolese "masses". Additional groups, such as labour unions, alumni associations, and ethnic syndicates, provided other Congolese the means of organisation. Among the most important of these was the Alliance des Bakongo (ABAKO), representing the Kongo people of the Lower Congo. However, they were restricted in their actions by the administration. While white settlers were consulted in the appointment of certain officials, the Congolese had no means of expressing their beliefs through the governing structures. Though native chiefs held legal authority in some jurisdictions, in practice they were used by the administration to further its own policies.

Up into the 1950s most évolués were concerned only with social inequalities and their treatment by the Belgians. Questions of self-government were not considered until 1954, when ABAKO requested that the administration consider a list of suggested candidates for a Léopoldville municipal post. That year the association was taken over by Joseph Kasa-Vubu, and under his leadership it became increasingly hostile to the colonial authority and sought autonomy for the Kongo regions in the Lower Congo. In 1956 a group of Congolese intellectuals under the tutelage of several European academics issued a manifesto calling for a transition to independence over the course of 30 years. The ABAKO quickly responded with a demand for "immediate independence". The Belgian government was not prepared to grant the Congo independence and even when it started realising the necessity of a plan for decolonisation in 1957, it was assumed that such a process would be solidly controlled by Belgium. In December 1957 the colonial administration instituted reforms that permitted municipal elections and the formation of political parties. Some Belgian parties attempted to establish branches in the colony, but these were largely ignored by the population in favour of Congolese-initiated groups. Nationalism fermented in 1958 as more évolués began interacting with others outside of their own locales and started discussing the future structures of a post-colonial Congolese state. Nevertheless, most political mobilisation occurred along tribal and regional divisions. In Katanga, various tribal groups came together to form the Confédération des associations tribales du Katanga (CONAKAT) under the leadership of Godefroid Munongo and Moïse Tshombe. Hostile to immigrant peoples, it advocated provincial autonomy and close ties with Belgium. Most of its support was rooted in individual chiefs, businessmen, and European settlers of southern Katanga. It was opposed by Jason Sendwe's Association Générale des Baluba du Katanga (BALUBAKAT).

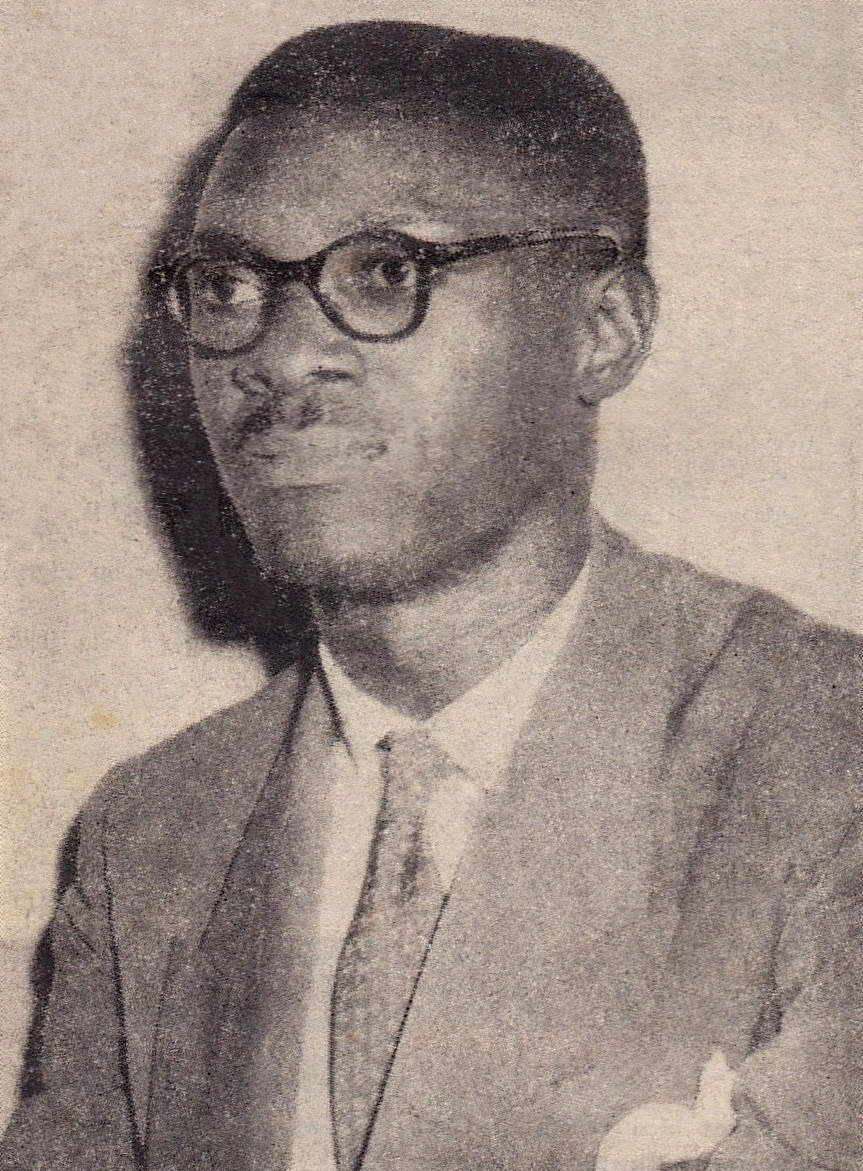
Patrice Lumumba, founding member and leader of the MNC

In October 1958 a group of Léopoldville évolués including Patrice Lumumba, Cyrille Adoula and Joseph Iléo established the Mouvement National Congolais (MNC). Diverse in membership, the party sought to peacefully achieve Congolese independence, promote the political education of the populace, and eliminate regionalism. The MNC drew most of its membership from the residents of the eastern city of Stanleyville, where Lumumba was well known, and from the population of the Kasai Province, where efforts were directed by a Muluba businessman, Albert Kalonji. Belgian officials appreciated its moderate and anti-separatist stance and allowed Lumumba to attend the All-African Peoples' Conference in Accra, Ghana, in December 1958 (Kasa-Vubu was informed that the documents necessary for his travel to the event were not in order and was not permitted to go). Lumumba was deeply impressed by the Pan-Africanist ideals of Ghanaian president Kwame Nkrumah and returned to the Congo with a more radical party programme. He reported on his trip during a widely attended rally in Léopoldville and demanded the country's "genuine" independence.

Fearing that they were being overshadowed by Lumumba and the MNC, Kasa-Vubu and the ABAKO leadership announced that they would be hosting their own rally in the capital on 4 January 1959. The municipal government (under Belgian domination) was given short notice, and communicated that only a "private meeting" would be authorised. On the scheduled day of the rally the ABAKO leadership told the crowd that had gathered that the event was postponed and that they should disperse. The mass was infuriated and instead began hurling stones at the police and pillaging European property, initiating three days of violent and destructive riots. The Force Publique, the colonial army, was called into service and suppressed the revolt with considerable brutality. In wake of the riots Kasa-Vubu and his lieutenants were arrested. Unlike earlier expressions of discontent, the grievances were conveyed primarily by uneducated urban residents, not évolués. Popular opinion in Belgium was one of extreme shock and surprise. An investigative commission found the riots to be the culmination of racial discrimination, overcrowding, unemployment, and wishes for more political self-determination. On 13 January the administration announced several reforms, and the Belgian King, Baudouin, declared that independence would be granted to the Congo in the future.

Meanwhile, discontent surfaced among the MNC leadership, who were bothered by Lumumba's domination over the party's politics. Relations between Lumumba and Kalonji also grew tense, as the former was upset with how the latter was transforming the Kasai branch into an exclusively Luba group and antagonising other tribes. This culminated into the split of the party into the MNC-Lumumba/MNC-L under Lumumba and the MNC-Kalonji/MNC-K under Kalonji and Iléo. The latter began advocating federalism. Adoula left the organisation. Alone to lead his own faction and facing competition from ABAKO, Lumumba became increasingly strident in his demands for independence. Following an October riot in Stanleyville he was arrested. Nevertheless, the influence of himself and the MNC-L continued to grow rapidly. The party advocated for a strong unitary state, nationalism, and the termination of Belgian rule and began forming alliances with regional groups, such as the Kivu-based Centre du Regroupement Africain (CEREA). Though the Belgians supported a unitary system over the federal models suggested by ABAKO and CONAKAT, they and more moderate Congolese were unnerved by Lumumba's increasingly extremist attitudes. With the implicit support of the colonial administration, the moderates formed the Parti National du Progrès (PNP) under the leadership of Paul Bolya and Albert Delvaux. It advocated centralisation, respect for traditional elements, and close ties with Belgium. In southern Léopoldville Province, a socialist-federalist party, the Parti Solidaire Africain (PSA) was founded. Antoine Gizenga served as its president, and Cléophas Kamitatu was in charge of the Léopoldville Province chapter.

=== The Belgo-Congolese Round Table Conference ===
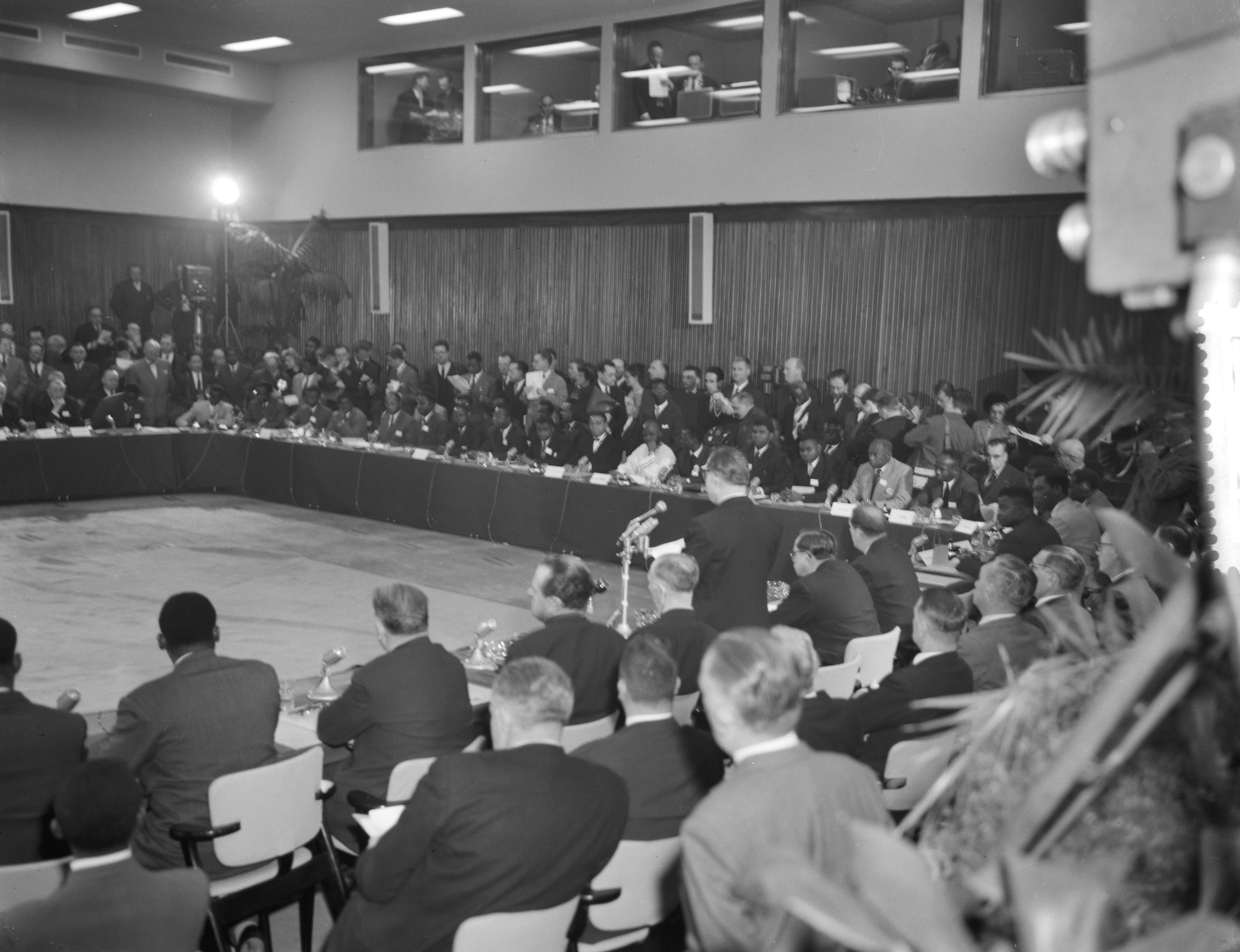
Opening meeting of the Belgo-Congolese Round Table Conference on 20 January 1960

After the riots of 4 January 1959 Belgian leaders became increasingly fearful of a violent political conflict emerging in the Congo. The security situation in the country deteriorated over the course of the year, especially in the Lower Congo and in Kasai, where violent clashes between Baluba and Lulua were taking place. Fearing the degeneration of the unrest into a colonial war and facing intense pressure for reform, in late 1959 the Belgian government announced that it would host a round table conference in Brussels in 1960 with the Congolese leadership to discuss the political future of the country.

On the eve of the conference the Congolese delegations banded into a "Common Front" and demanded that all decisions be made binding on the Belgian government and that the Congo be granted immediate independence. The conference formally opened on 20 January. In the first speech, the Belgian prime minister assured that the Congo would be granted independence but did not specify a date. Serious negotiations did not commence until the following day. Kasa-Vubu demanded that a Congolese government be formed immediately, but his request was denied. Disagreements between him and the Belgians over the competence of the conference led to the former walking out during the negotiations. It was then suggested that the date of independence be discussed. Lumumba, meanwhile, was released from prison and flew to Brussels to participate in the conference. On 27 January he made his first appearance and voiced his support for independence. After some discussion the Common Front accepted the date of 30 June 1960 for sovereignty to be granted to the Congo. The decisions of the delegates were ratified in a series of resolutions on 19 February and the conference closed the following day.

=== The Loi Fondamentale ===
It was decided at the Round Table Conference that the resolutions the participants adopted would serve as the basis for the Loi Fondamentale (Fundamental Law), a transitional constitution for the Congo until a permanent one could be promulgated by a Congolese parliament sitting as a constituent assembly. Summarising the similarities between the Loi Fondementale and the Constitution of Belgium, Raymond Scheyven, Minister-in-charge of Economic Affairs for the Congo, observed, "We have presented the Congolese with a political system similar to ours....It features communes, provincial assemblies, a bicameral system, and a political system where the head of state is irresponsible."

The division of executive power between a presumably symbolic head of state and head of government was the most noticeable and potentially troublesome feature borrowed from the Belgian constitution. As in a parliamentary system, such power was to be exercised by a prime minister and a cabinet responsible to Parliament. If the cabinet lost the confidence of Parliament, a motion of censure would be passed (either with a simple majority in both houses of a two-thirds majority in a single house) and it would be dismissed. By comparison, the head of state (a President) was irresponsible and only had the power to ratify treaties, promulgate laws, and nominate high-ranking officials (including the Prime Minister and the cabinet).

A parliament was to be composed of a lower chamber and an upper chamber. The lower chamber (Chamber of Deputies) would consist of 137 members directly "elected by universal suffrage according to the procedure fixed by the electoral law" with one deputy for every 100,000 people. The upper chamber (Senate) would be composed of 14 members from each province, elected by the members of their respective provincial assemblies. Senators and deputies that assumed a ministerial post in the central government were allowed to retain their seats in Parliament. The provincial assemblies were unicameral and varied in size, depending on the population of the provinces they served.

Articles 219 and 220 delineated the authority of the central and provincial governments. The division of authority, a compromise between the federalist and unitarianist politicians, was dubbed by Belgian lawyers as "quasi-federalism".

== Campaign ==
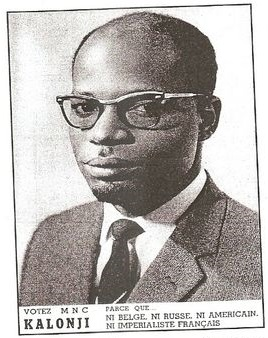
MNC-K campaign poster for Albert Kalonji

Even though the date for independence had been established at the Round Table Conference, there was still substantial uncertainty throughout the Congo as to which faction would come to dominate politics in the new government. This caused deep anxiety among most of the electorate. As the Congolese had little experience in democratic processes, few eligible voters in rural areas realised the meaning and importance of an election, and even fewer understood electoral mechanics and procedure. Electoral procedure was prescribed by the electoral law of 23 March 1960. Voting was compulsory for all "males of Congolese status". Yet in order to register, one had to be at least 21 years of age and had to have resided in their respective constituency for at least six months. In order to be a candidate for provincial or federal office, one had to be at least 25 years of age, been born to a Congolese mother, and had to have resided in the Congo for at least five years. For aspiring senators, the age requirement was 30.

The official electoral campaign began on 11 May, marred by confusion and violence. Rival parties employed tactics that ranged from threats to sabotage of an opponent's headquarters to murder. Such intimidation was especially prevalent in areas that were under heavy influence from the militant sects of CEREA, the PSA, ABAKO, the MNC-L, and the MNC-K. This was due not only to such parties' own radical, differing beliefs but also to a general suspicion that the Belgians would organise the contest to favor the moderates. With the notable exceptions of CONAKAT, the PNP, and the Parti de l'Unité Nationale (PUNA), most parties' rhetoric was anti-colonial in focus. The rapid onset of the campaign also broke up alliances and understandings various parties had with one another in the lead up to the conference in Brussels, such as those between ABAKO and the PSA. Frequent attacks on the colonial administration by candidates led to confusion among segments of the electorate, which were given the impression that all forms of government—except welfare services—were to be eliminated after independence. Openly socialist messages declined during the campaign, with the exception of Gizenga's speeches. Freedom of religion was also a major issue, especially in areas where Islam or separatist forms of Christianity were prominent. This led to attacks on the Catholic Church's monopoly on the education system. The MNC-L and the PNP were the only parties to launch significant national campaigns; most contests were energised by regional and provincial considerations. The parties in favor of a unitary system of government tended to place their best candidates in the central government races, while their federalist counterparts focused on provincial campaigns. While several parties focused their efforts in ways to enable or support coalition governments in the provinces, only the MNC-L strategised for a parliamentary majority coalition in informing its campaign for national parliamentary seats. Alliances such as they existed were mostly not informed by ideology.

In the tumult of the last days of the Belgian domination, incidents caused returns to come late in some places.

== Results ==
=== Chamber of Deputies ===
Party	Votes	%	Seats
Congolese National Movement–Lumumba	521,187	23.44	33
Parti Solidaire Africain	278,971	12.54	13
ABAKO	210,542	9.47	12
Congolese National Movement–Kalonji	147,578	6.64	7
Parti National du Progrès	137,195	6.17	7
CONAKAT	104,821	4.71	8
Centre de Regroupement Africain	95,721	4.30	10
Party of National Unity	92,547	4.16	7
BALUBAKAT (CK)	80,434	3.62	6
Congolese National Union	63,425	2.85	3
Kwangolese Union for Independence and Liberty	52,612	2.37	3
Kasaian Union	47,526	2.14	2
Congolese Grouping	41,202	1.85	4
Basonge Unity Movement (MNC-L)	30,280	1.36	1
ATCAR (CK)	29,657	1.33	1
MEDERCO (PNP)	27,634	1.24	2
Ngwaka Association (PUNA)	26,114	1.17	2
Kasaian Coalition (MNC-L)	21,465	0.97	1
Alliance des Bayanzi	21,024	0.95	1
UNEBAFI (MNC-L)	19,324	0.87	1
Common Front–Delvaux	17,716	0.80	1
ARP−PRC	16,892	0.76	1
Union of the Mongo	16,739	0.75	1
MNC-Kalonji Independents	14,364	0.65	1
Coutumier (PNP)	13,408	0.60	1
Democratic Rally of Lac, Kwango and Kwilu	12,761	0.57	1
Regional parties	19,422	0.87	2
Independents	63,333	2.85	5
Total	2,223,894	100.00	137
Valid votes	2,223,894	80.18	
Invalid/blank votes	549,701	19.82	
Total votes	2,773,595	100.00	
Registered voters/turnout	3,390,940	81.79	
Source: Nohlen et al.

=== Senate ===
Party	Seats
Congolese National Movement-Lumumba	21
Centre de Regroupement Africain	7
CONAKAT	7
ABAKO	5
Cartel Katangais	5
Parti Solidaire Africain	5
Congolese National Movement-Kalonji	4
Union of the Mongo	4
Congolese National Union	3
Parti National du Progrès	3
LUKA	2
Congolese Grouping	1
Democratic Rally of Lac, Kwango and Kwilu	1
Kasaian Coalition	1
People's Party	1
Other parties	1
Independents	5
Total	76
Source: Sternberger et al.

== Reactions ==
After the results were announced, Lumumba stated, "I am ready to co-operate with our opponents to form a national union government." Belgium was surprised by the MNC-L's electoral success. Belgians who had anticipated a PNP-led government were revolted at the prospect of Lumumba leading an independent Congo. Many members of the various foreign missions in the Congo, however, believed that he was the only man capable of bringing order and stability to the country.
