= Grégoire Kamanga =

Congolese politician

Minister of Public Health of the Republic of the Congo
- In office 24 June 1960 – 12 September 1960
- President: Joseph Kasa-Vubu
- Prime Minister: Patrice Lumumba
- In office 2 August 1961 – July 1962
- Prime Minister: Cyrille Adoula

President of Unite-Kasaïenne Province
- In office 10 September 1962 – July 1963

Personal details
- Born: 20 October 1927
- Party: Coalition Kasaïenne
- Education: Lovanium University

Grégoire Kamanga (born 20 October 1927) was a Congolese politician who twice served as Minister of Public Health of the Republic of the Congo. He also founded the Coalition Kasaïenne and served as Provincial President of Unite-Kasaïenne.

== Biography ==
Grégoire Kamanga was born on 20 October 1927 to a Bakete family. He undertook six years of medical assistant courses at Lovanium University. Though he performed well as a student, he did not pursue a university degree to become a doctor, to the disappointment of his teachers. He was married. In 1959 in Luluabourg Kamanga founded the Coalition Kasaïenne (COAKA) party to unify several minor tribes of Kasaï Province—including the Babindji, Basala Mpasu, and Bena Mputa—against the political threat posed by the dominant Lulua and Baluba. In the Congo's first elections the following year he won a seat in the Chamber of Deputies on a COAKA ticket with 20,050 preferential votes, representing the Lulua constituency. In Parliament's pre-independence discussions, he suggested that the country be named the "Republic of Zaire". He served as Minister of Public Health in Patrice Lumumba's government until he was dismissed by presidential order on 12 September 1960.

"I gathered that his shortness of stature gave him some sort of complex; but as a skilled medical assistant he would make, I was convinced, an excellent Minister of Public Health."

— Thomas Kanza's reflection on Kamanga

Kamanga was arrested by the central government on 14 February 1961. Two days later he was flown to Bakwanga alongside six other Lumumba supporters. They were all tried by a tribunal of customary chiefs for committing "crimes against the [Baluba] people." The following day Kamanga was sentenced to five years imprisonment, but he was released in mid-March. Following his return to the capital in April he created and became chief of the autonomous state of Unite-Kasaïenne. He took part in the Coquilhatville Conference in May that resulted in the Congolese government's recognition of the internal territory. After intense negotiation among various political factions a new Congolese central government was formed on 2 August under Cyrille Adoula, and Kamanga reassumed his position as Minister of Public Health. In July 1962 Adoula reshuffled his government and Kamanga was dismissed from his post. Unite-Kasaïenne was statutorily recognised as a province in August. Kamanga was elected provincial president by the provincial assembly 12 to four on 10 September, and served in that office until July 1963. During his tenure he frequently disregarded the expressed opinions of the provincial assembly and reportedly partook in diamond trafficking.
