= Raphael Batshikama =

Congolese politician

- Born: Zaire, now the Democratic Republic of the Congo
- Occupation: Politician

Raphael Batshikama was a Congolese politician. He was appointed as the first Secretary of State for the Interior of Zaire, now the Democratic Republic of the Congo, under Lumumba Government that ran from 24 June until 12 September 1960 under the leadership of Prime Minister Patrice Lumumba. He was the member of ABAKO.

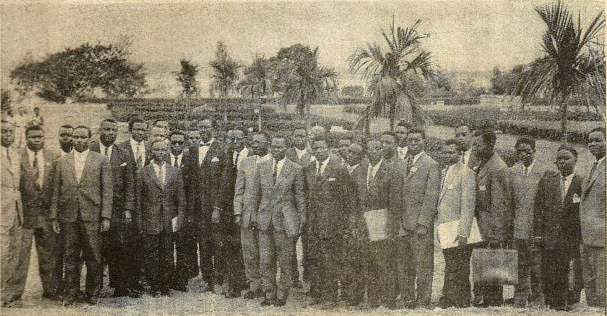
Patrice Lumumba (left center) with his first government including Raphael Batshikama outside the Palais de la Nation soon after swearing-in ceremony

.
