= Antoine Kiwewa =

Congolese politician

- Born: Zaire, now the Democratic Republic of the Congo
- Occupation: Politician

Antoine Kiwewa was a Congolese politician. He was appointed as the first Secretary of State for External Commerce of Zaire, now the Democratic Republic of the Congo, under the Lumumba Government that ran from 24 June until 12 September 1960 under the leadership of Prime Minister Patrice Lumumba. He was the member of MNC-L.

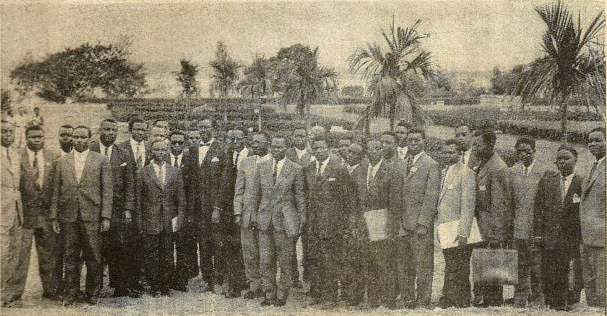
Patrice Lumumba (left center) with his first government including Antoine Kiwewa outside the Palais de la Nation soon after swearing-in ceremony

.
