= Maximilien Liongo =

Congolese politician

- Born: Zaire, now the Democratic Republic of the Congo
- Occupation: Politician

Maximilien Liongo was a Congolese politician. He was appointed as the first Secretary of State for Justice of Zaire, now the Democratic Republic of the Congo, under Lumumba Government that ran from 24 June until 12 September 1960 under the leadership of Prime Minister Patrice Lumumba.

Liongo joined the Mouvement National Congolais, a nationalist Congolese political party, and served on its first national committee in 1958.

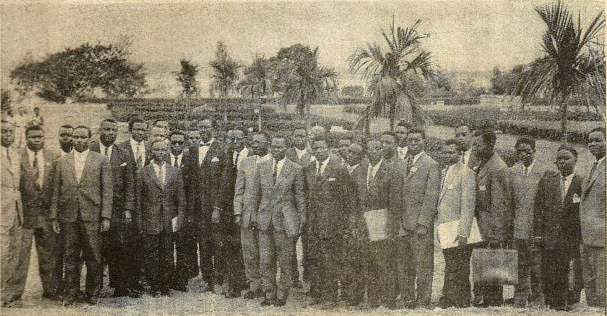
Patrice Lumumba (left center) with his first government including Maximilien Liongo outside the Palais de la Nation soon after swearing-in ceremony

.

== Works cited ==
- Kanza, Thomas R. (1994). The Rise and Fall of Patrice Lumumba: Conflict in the Congo (expanded ed.). Rochester, Vermont: Schenkman Books, Inc. ISBN 978-0-87073-901-9.
