= Zacharie Tshimanga Wa Tshibangu =

Congolese historian and writer (1941 - 1985)

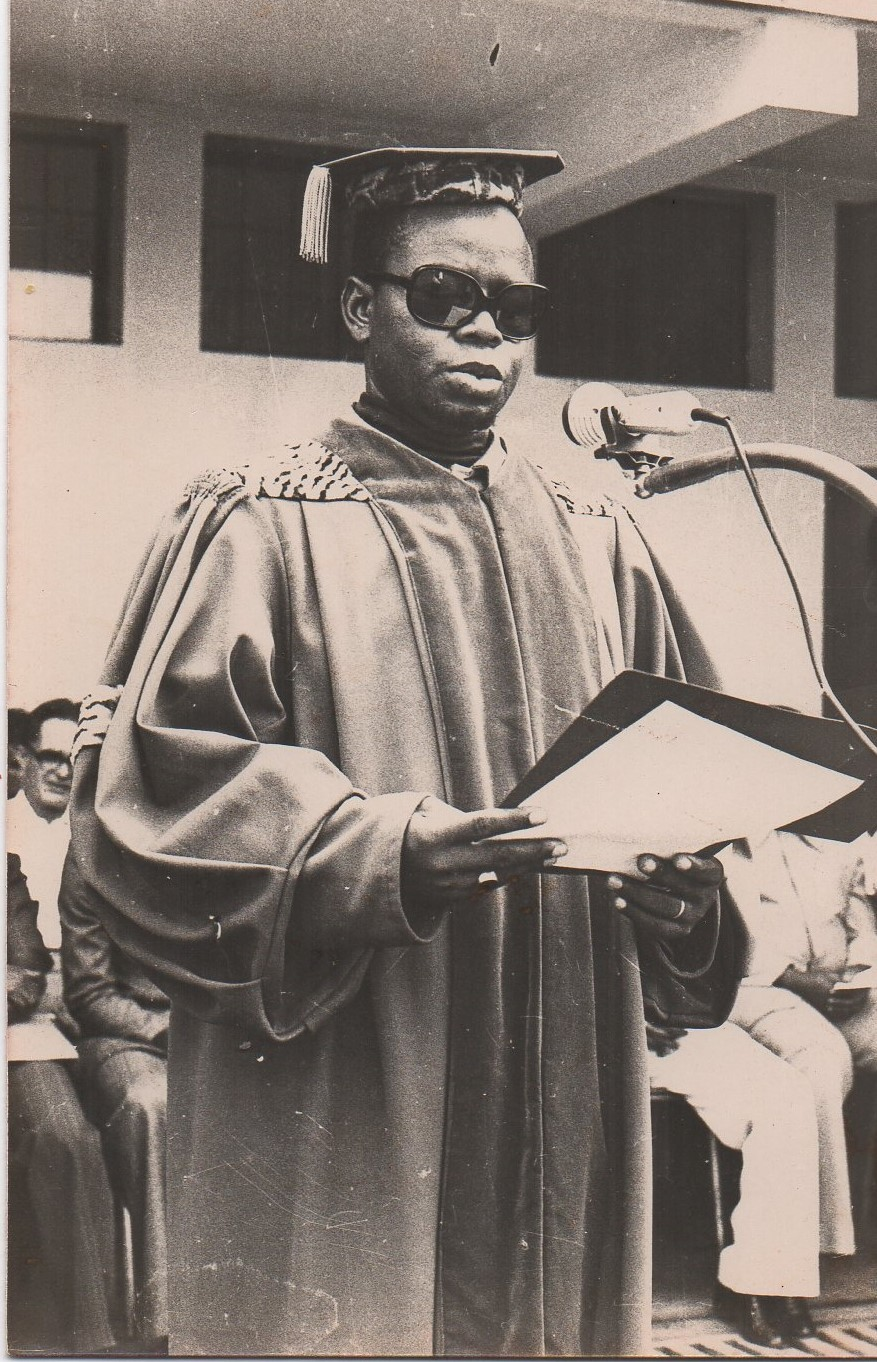
- Born: Zacharie Tshimanga Wa Tshibangu; 4 October 1941; Musefu, Belgian Congo (modern-day Democratic Republic of the Congo)
- Died: 10 December 1985 (aged 44); Brussels, Belgium
- Occupation(s): Professor, writer, author, scholar
- Known for: Historical and Educational Writings on DRC.
- Spouse: Véronique CHIKWAKA
- Parent(s): Camille Tshibangu and Mbelu

Signature
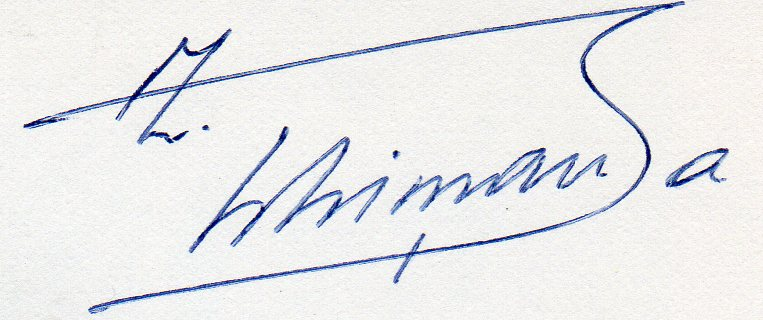

Zacharie Tshimanga Wa Tshibangu was a Congolese historian and writer and co-founder of the SOHIZA in 1974.

== Biography ==
Zacharie Tshimanga was born on 4 October 1941, in Musefu.

== Works ==
Tshimanga Wa Tshibangu published the following works:

=== Books ===
==== Essays ====
- (in French) Histoire du Zaire Editions Ceruki, 1976
- (in French) Enseignement en République du Zaire Editions BASE, 1986

==== Articles ====
- (in French) Léopold II face à la France au sujet de la création des droits d'entrée dans le bassin conventionnel du Congo: 1890 et 1892. In "Études d'histoire africaine" No. 6 page 169–203, 1974 Kinshasa, Éditions UNAZA-PUZ
