= André Mandi =

Congolese politician

- Born: Zaire, now the Democratic Republic of the Congo
- Occupation: Politician

André Mandi was a Congolese politician. He was appointed as the first Secretary of State for Foreign Affairs of Zaire, now the Democratic Republic of the Congo, under Lumumba Government that ran from 24 June until 12 September 1960 under the leadership of Prime Minister Patrice Lumumba. He was the member of PUNA.

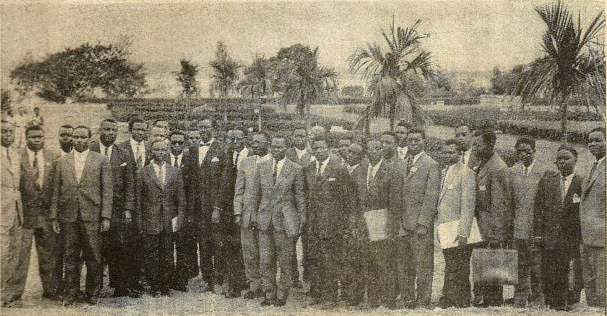
Patrice Lumumba (left center) with his first government including André Mandi outside the Palais de la Nation soon after swearing-in ceremony
