= Rémy Mwamba =

Congolese politician (1921–1967)

Minister of Justice of the Republic of the Congo
- In office 24 June 1960 – 5 September 1960
- Prime Minister: Patrice Lumumba
- In office 2 August 1961 – July 1962
- Prime Minister: Cyrille Adoula
- Succeeded by: Jean-Chrysostome Weregemere

Personal details
- Born: 1921 Vunga, Belgian Congo
- Died: 1967 (aged 45) Kinshasa, Democratic Republic of the Congo
- Party: Association Générale des Baluba du Katanga

Rémy Mwamba (1921–1967) was a Congolese politician who twice served as Minister of Justice of the Democratic Republic of the Congo (then Republic of the Congo). He was also a leading figure of the Association Générale des Baluba du Katanga (BALUBAKAT).

Mwamba was born in 1921 in Vunga, Belgian Congo to a Luba family. After completing his education he took up work at the Élisabethville Parquet. He later co-founded and became secretary-general of BALUBAKAT. He served in the Collége Exécutive Général transitional government before being elected a senator of the newly independent Republic of the Congo in 1960. Mwamba was subsequently appointed to serve as Minister of Justice in the first government under Prime Minister Patrice Lumumba. On 5 September he and Lumumba were dismissed by the President. Following harassment by the new authorities, Mwamba fled to Stanleyville and joined a rival regime. Negotiations led to the creation of a new government in August 1961 under Cyrille Adoula and he resumed his work as Minister of Justice. Following his dismissal in July 1962, Mwamba joined the parliamentary opposition. He died in 1967.

== Early life and entry into politics ==
Rémy Mwamba was born in 1921 in Vunga, Belgian Congo. He was a Muluba and a direct descendant of Mutombo Mukulu. (Note: Mutombo Mukulu was a Muluba chief who oversaw the creation of one of the earliest Luba polities in the Congo. Mwamba stressed his familial connection to him to increase his appeal to the Baluba and thus enhance his political prospects.) He underwent six years of primary education before studying at the Institut Saint-Boniface in Élisabethville for four years, followed by two years of secondary education. Mwamba eventually became chief clerk of the Élisabethville Parquet and a member of the council of the Kenya commune. (Note: A communal council was a board of government for a commune, an administrative division of a city or town.) He also co-founded the Association Générale des Baluba du Katanga (BALUBAKAT) party in 1957 and became its secretary-general. He was a friend and confidant of BALUBAKAT leader Jason Sendwe.

Mwamba attended the Belgo-Congolese Round Table Conference of January–February 1960 in Brussels as delegate of the BALUBAKAT cartel. The Congolese delegates accepted the offer of the independence of the "Republic of the Congo" on 30 June 1960 from the Belgian government. Mwamba was appointed to a commission established to determine whether Belgium should retain any powers or official responsibilities in the Congo after 30 June. Ultimately the commission decided that the Congolese state should assume all responsibilities of governance. One of the resolutions adopted at the Round Table called for the establishment of a Collége Exécutive Général (General Executive College), a body composed of six Congolese (one from each province) designed to share power with the Governor-general until independence. Mwamba served in it on behalf of Katanga.

In May 1960 Mwamba went to Brazzaville at the invitation of Congo-Brazza President Fulbert Youlou to listen to a proposal for the incorporation of the Republic of the Congo and Congo-Brazza into a larger federation. He unsuccessfully competed for a seat in the Chamber of Deputies in the general elections that preceded independence. However, on 12 June he was elected as a non-customary member of the Senate by the Katangese Provincial Assembly. That month he investigated the legitimacy of the elections in Katanga.

== Minister of Justice ==
"Rémy Mwamba, the Minister of Justice, had had a certain amount of legal experience, for he had been working for a long time in various tribunals in Katanga. He belonged to a group of Katanga-born Congolese who considered themselves more politically mature than 'the Congolese'."

— Thomas Kanza's reflection on Mwamba

Mwamba was appointed to serve as Minister of Justice in the first government of the independent Congo under Prime Minister Patrice Lumumba. The government was invested by Parliament on 24 June 1960. He competed with Minister of Interior Christophe Gbenye to assert his authority over the Sûreté Nationale (security police) until Lumumba attached the chief of the organisation to his own office. On 5 July the Congolese garrisons in Léopoldville and Thysville mutinied, triggering a domestic crisis. On 8 July the Council of Ministers convened to discuss reorganisation of the army. Several ministers wanted Joseph-Désiré Mobutu to become the new Commander-in-Chief. Mwamba believed he was too young and suggested Victor Lundula for the role. The ministers eventually compromised, accepting Mwamba's recommendation and making Mobutu the army chief of staff. Three days later Mwamba ordered the Procureur général to launch inquiries into the actions of soldiers against Europeans in the province of Kasai. On 28 July he was made a member of a cabinet committee established to coordinate government actions with those of United Nations officials. In early August he went to New York as part of a Congolese delegation to address the UN Security Council. On 5 September President Joseph Kasa-Vubu dismissed Lumumba, Mwamba, and several other members of the government from office.

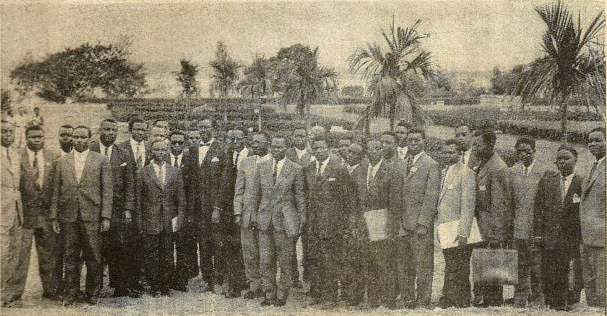
Mwamba served as Minister of Justice in the first Congolese government (pictured).

The government was paralyzed by the political battle that ensued, and on 14 September, Colonel Mobutu announced a military takeover and the installation of his own administration. Two days later, Lumumba was placed under house arrest. By October, Lumumba's supporters were convinced that few of their goals could be achieved through the new government. In November Mobutu's troops arrested and harassed several of them, including Mwamba. Antoine Gizenga, the former Deputy Prime Minister, fled to Stanleyville to set up a new pro-Lumumba regime. Mwamba attempted to escape to the city with Lumumba and Pierre Mulele. At the Sankuru river Lumumba was separated from his wife and youngest child and, against Mwamba's and Mulele's advice, went back for them and was arrested. Mwamba and Mulele spent several days in the bush before reaching Stanleyville. Once there the former was made Minister of Justice in Gizenga's government. In January 1961 Lumumba was executed in the secessionist State of Katanga. His death brought negative opinion of both Katanga and the central government to a climax. Hoping to defuse the situation, the Léopoldville authorities opened serious negotiations with Gizenga's regime. The following month Mwamba toured the declared "Province of Lualaba" in northern Katanga. On 2 August a compromise between the central government and Gizenga's regime resulted in the installation of a new national coalition government under Cyrille Adoula. Mwamba returned to his post as Minister of Justice. In late December he accompanied Adoula to Kitona to negotiate with Katangese President Moïse Tshombe. In July 1962 Adoula shuffled his cabinet and Mwamba was dismissed.

== Later life ==
Following his removal from the government, Mwamba entered the parliamentary opposition and worked to dislodge Adoula. In 1963 he criticised the creation of Nord-Katanga, a Luba-dominated province split off from the rest of Katanga. Mwamba also called for the BALUBAKAT to revert to the use of one of its earlier names, Parti Progressiste Katangais, to change its ethnic nature and allow it to become a "Pankatangais" party. In March 1964 BALUBAKAT formed a cartel with two other political parties, CONAKAT and AFEKER, to become the ABC. Mwamba was elected its president in July. He was later arrested, but was released in August 1965 at the instruction of Kasa-Vubu. He died of a heart attack in Kinshasa in 1967 at the age of 45.
