= Musefu =

- Location in the Democratic Republic of the Congo
- Coordinates: 07°49′S 22°43′E
- Country: DR Congo
- Province: Kasai-Central
- Time zone: UTC+2 (Central Africa Time)

Musefu is a town located in Kasai-Central. A southern-central province of Democratic Republic of the Congo.
