= Jacques Lumbala =

Congolese politician

- Born: Zaire, now the Democratic Republic of the Congo
- Occupation: Politician

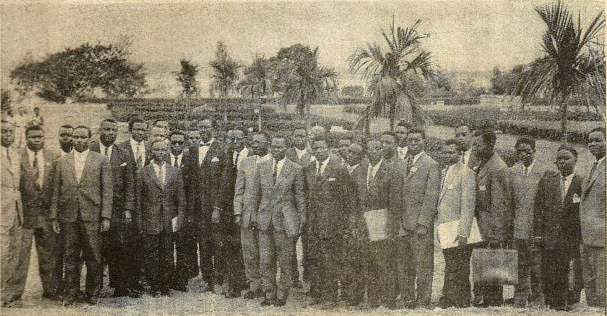
Patrice Lumumba (left center) with his first government including Jacques Lumbala outside the Palais de la Nation soon after swearing-in ceremony

.

Jacques Lumbala was a Congolese politician. He was appointed as the first Secretary of State to the Presidency of Zaire, now the Democratic Republic of the Congo, under Lumumba Government that ran from 24 June until 12 September 1960 under the leadership of Prime Minister Patrice Lumumba. He was a member of PNP.

While a secretary for the PNP in Kivu Province, MNC politician reportedly had Joseph-Désiré Mobutu bribe Lumbala to secure his political allegiance. According to Thomas Kanza, Lumbala and Mobutu held much influence in the final determination of Lumumba's government. Lumbala thereafter bribed 13 members of Parliament to support Lumumba's preferred candidate for president.

== Works cited ==
- Kanza, Thomas R. (1994). The Rise and Fall of Patrice Lumumba: Conflict in the Congo (expanded ed.). Rochester, Vermont: Schenkman Books, Inc. ISBN 978-0-87073-901-9.
- Kent, John (2010). America, the UN and Decolonisation: Cold War Conflict in the Congo. London: Routledge. ISBN 9781136972898.
