= Paul Bolya =

Congolese politician

Paul Bolya or Bolya Ifekwa Lobok'ete (10 October 1924 – 2002) was a Congolese politician and leader of a faction in the nationalist movement in the Belgian Congo before independence.

== Biography ==
Paul Bolya was born on 10 October 1924 in Bengale, Équateur Province, Belgian Congo, to a Mongo family. In Bamanya he undertook six years of study at the Ecole Primaire des Missionnaires du Scare-Coeur and a further four at the Ecole Normale des Freres des Ecoles Chretiennes, graduating with his certification as a teacher. In 1948 he earned his certification as a medical assistant. He also undertook a training course at the Institut de médecine tropicale d'Anvers and served as an instructor at the École des Assistants médicaux de Léopoldville.

=== Political career ===
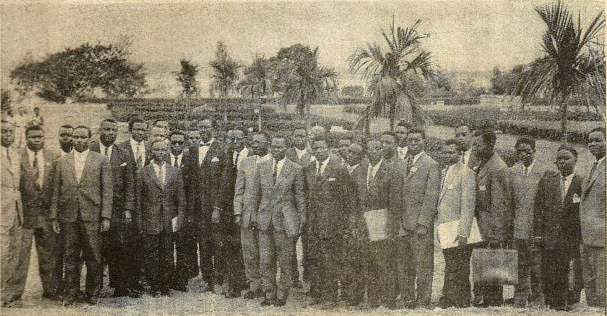
First Congolese government

At the Constituent Congress of Coquilhatville in November 1959 Bolya became the president of the Parti National du Progrès (PNP). He represented the PNP at the Belgo-Congolese Round Table Conference and was the first delegate to formally propose the adoption of a resolution for Congolese independence. He was chosen to be one of the vice presidents of the talks. Bolya served on the Executive Board to the Governor General from March to June 1960. In May he was selected as a member of the Union des Mongo (UNIMO) to be a senator on behalf of Équateur Province.

Bolya was considered for the post of Minister of Health in the first Congolese government but ended up serving as a minister of state. From 12 September to October 10 he briefly served as Minister of Health under Prime Minister Joseph Ileo. In February 1961 he was made Minister of Public Service, a post he held until 2 August, when was made Secretary of State for Justice. He returned to his position as Minister of Health on 11 July 1962.

In 1997 Laurent-Désiré Kabila seized control of the Congo. Afterwards he created a commission to draft a new constitution for the country. Bolya was appointed to the commission.

Bolya was the father of Désiré Bolya Baenga, an essayist and writer.
