= Raymond Scheyven =

Belgian politician (1911–1987)

- Born: Raymond Albert Marie Scheyven; 26 November 1911; Brussels, Belgium
- Died: 17 January 1987 (aged 75); Brussels, Belgium
- Occupation: politician

Raymond Albert Marie Scheyven (26 November 1911 – 17 January 1987) was a Belgian politician, banker, and minister for the PSC. During the Second World War, his code name was Socrates, leading to his forming and leading the civil resistance group, The Socrates Service, that worked to support those who refused forced labour in Germany, aiding Jewish families, and coordinating the finances of the armed resistance. The Service Socrates organization borrowed, in the name of the Belgian government in exile, 200 million francs for the anti-Nazi Belgian underground between the end of 1943 and liberation.

== The Socrates Service ==
The organization used a complex system to show prospective lenders that they were legitimate. They would invite the lender to suggest a phrase that would be mentioned on the BBC on a specific night. The underground would then pass on the specific request to the London authorities, where the exiled Belgian government was based. The phrase would then be broadcast at a given time to assure the individual lenders of the credibility of the underground agents.

As a guarantee and to prevent both the network and the Belgian government against false claims in the future, lenders were given certificates with their loan amount and with a number. Scheyven, under his pseudonym Socrates, signed these certificates; a copy of his signature was on file in London for comparison when time came for repayment after the war.
