= Palais de la Nation (Kinshasa) =

Coordinates: 4.3025°S 15.2801°E

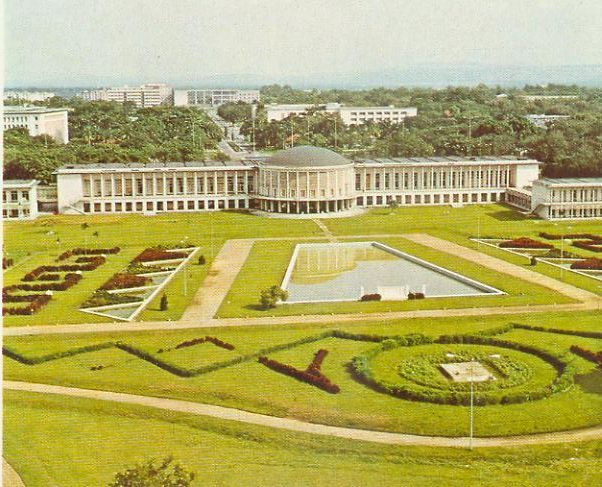
- Southwards-facing view of the Palais de la nation and its gardens taken in 1986
- Interactive map of the Palais de la Nation area

General information
- Architectural style: Classical Modernism
- Location: Gombe, Kinshasa, Democratic Republic of the Congo
- Current tenants: Félix Tshisekedi, President of the Democratic Republic of the Congo
- Construction started: 1924; 102 years ago
- Completed: June 1960; 65 years ago

Design and construction
- Architect: Marcel Lambrichs

The Palace of the Nation (French: Palais de la Nation) is the official residence and principal workplace of the President of the Democratic Republic of the Congo. It is situated in Gombe, in the northern part of Kinshasa, next to the Congo River. It has held this role since 2001, following the assassination of Laurent-Désiré Kabila.

Constructed in 1956 based on Marcel Lambrichs' design, the palais was initially conceived as the residence for the colonial Governor-General. After independence from Belgium, in 1960, the Palais metamorphosed into a symbol of the new state. The official proceedings commemorating the nation's newfound autonomy, including King Baudouin's Proclamation, declaring the Congo's independence and Patrice Lumumba's speech denouncing colonialism, took place in the palais on June 30. After the nation's independence, the residence briefly served as the seat of the Congolese parliamentary body, which now convenes in the People's Palace.

In the aftermath of the reconstruction and revival of the Congolese state following the fall of Mobutu Sese Seko, a mausoleum honoring Laurent-Désiré Kabila was unveiled near the palace's entrance on 18 January 2002.

== History ==
On July 1, 1923, a Royal Decree firmly established Léopoldville (now Kinshasa) as the capital of the Belgian Congo, a decree reinforced in August when the fast growing town (population: 23,000) was granted urban district status. This monumental shift had been contemplated for some time, culminating in a proclamation by former Belgian Prime Minister Henry Carton de Wiart during his visit to Léopoldville the previous October, wherein he pledged the imminent establishment of the government between Léopoldville and Kinshasa commune.

The residence was initially envisioned in 1924 in Beaux-Arts style by architect Maurice Vander Elst, synthesizing the forms of the Royal Museum for Central Africa and the Royal Palace of Brussels, both evocative of Leopold II of Belgium. Concerns regarding the Governor General's pre-existing metal residence, derisively referred to as the "sardine can," accentuated the urgency to craft a design befitting the aspirations of the colony.

Consequently, In 1928, a new competition was convened, with twelve architects submitting their visions. Raymond Moenaert's design was chosen to harmonize with the climate using Mediterranean elements. However, Governor Auguste Tilkens found aspects of the design incongruous and Moenaert was instructed to reenvision it. Nonetheless, the seat of the capital was moved to Léopoldville in October 1929 without the completion of the Governor's residence. During King Albert's visit to the Colony in July 1928, he inaugurated an equestrian statue of Leopold II looming over the front entrance. Plans for the construction of the Governor's residence were postponed with the advent of the Great Depression.

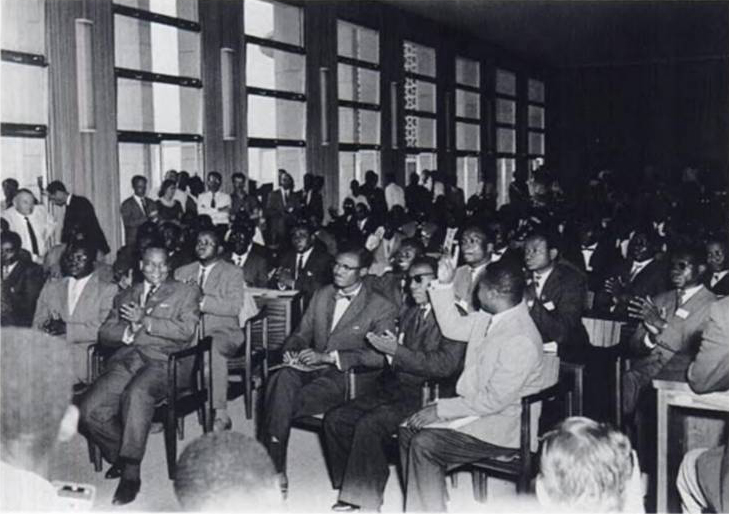
Patrice Lumumba's government receives a vote of confidence from the Congolese Chamber of Representatives, ca. June 1960

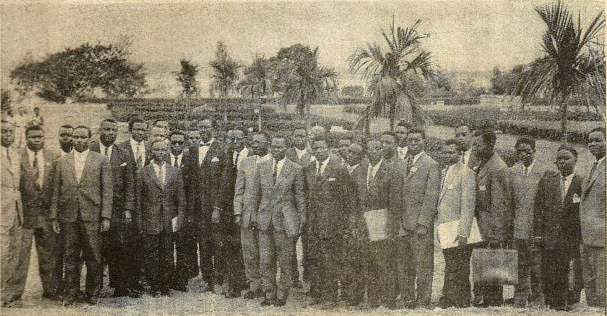
Prime Minister Patrice Lumumba (left center, wearing bow tie) with his government outside the Palace of the Nation following its investiture

In the aftermath of World War II, minimal modifications were made to the government district, with minor augmentations to the radial street layout and bungalows for civil servants. Notably, the Colonial Ministry's Urbanization Service, headed by Georges Ricquier, devised plans for "Le Grand Léo". Minister Robert Godding rekindled pre-war plans in 1945, but Governor General Eugene Jungers sought a new design from architect Georges Strapaert. Ultimately, Marcel Lambrichs' classical modernist design, selected in the 1951 competition, saw fruition with construction commencing in 1956. Completion coincided with Congo Independence Day in June 1960, and the building transitioned into the inaugural Parliament. Prime Minister Patrice Lumumba moved into the "Tilkens" residence, which became the Prime Minister's official home. In 1967, as part of the Zairianisation policy established by President Mobutu Sese Seko, the equestrian statue of King Leopold II was removed from its prominent position.

Following the Second Congo War and the assassination of Laurent-Désiré Kabila, the Palais de la Nation transformed into an official residence and primary workspace during Joseph Kabila's administration. Between January 2001 and January 2002, a mausoleum was erected in front of the palace in honor of President Laurent-Désiré Kabila.
