= Lumumba Government =

Former government of DRC

Lumumba Government Gouvernement Lumumba
- 1st Government of the Republic of the Congo (now the Democratic Republic of the Congo)

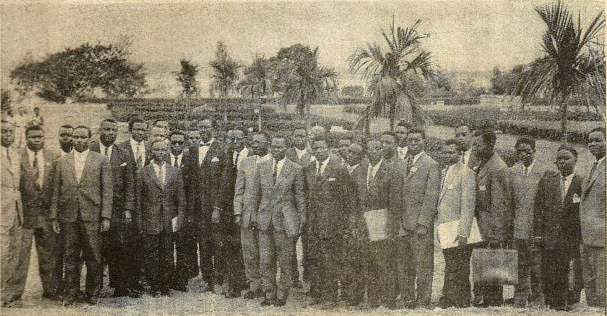
- Prime Minister Patrice Lumumba (left center, wearing bow tie) with his government outside the Palais de la Nation following its investiture
- Date formed: 24 June 1960
- Date dissolved: 10 September 1960 (Note: Lumumba and six members of his government were dismissed by Kasa-Vubu on 5 September 1960 and his administration was officially replaced by a new government five days later. Lumumba contested the action and Parliament reaffirmed its confidence in his leadership. The government was definitively removed from power by a military coup on 14 September.)

People and organisations
- Head of state: Joseph Kasa-Vubu (Note: Constitutionally, the head of state was not considered a member of the government.)
- Head of government: Patrice Lumumba
- Deputy head of government: Antoine Gizenga
- No. of ministers: 23
- Status in legislature: MNC-L-led coalition
- Opposition leaders: Jean Bolikango; Joseph Iléo; Albert Kalonji

History
- Election: 1960 Belgian Congo general election
- Legislature term: 1st Congolese Parliament
- Budget: £51.5 million (July–December 1960)
- Predecessor: none
- Successor: 1st Iléo Government (Note: Following a coup on 14 September, Iléo's and Lumumba's governments, which had been contesting each other for control of the Congo, were replaced by a "College of Commissioners-General". In December the former Deputy Prime Minister, Gizenga, declared his own government in the eastern portion of the country to be the legal successor to Lumumba's.)

The Lumumba Government (French: Gouvernement Lumumba), also known as the Lumumba Ministry or Lumumba Cabinet, was the first set of ministers, ministers of state, and secretaries of state who governed the Democratic Republic of the Congo (then Republic of the Congo) under the leadership of Prime Minister Patrice Lumumba from 24 June until 12 September 1960. The government inherited many problems from the era of the Belgian Congo, a tightly administered colony which for most of its existence had few political freedoms. Its members came from different social classes and different tribes, and they held varied political beliefs. Weak and divided, its tenure was dominated by a widespread mutiny in the army and two secessions. An exodus of thousands of Belgian functionaries—who had controlled most of the bureaucracy—left the administration in disarray. The United Nations created a large multinational peacekeeping force to assist the government in reestablishing law and order. Western nations were under the impression that Lumumba was a communist, and the United States, Belgium, and France all worked to undermine and divide his government. Domestic opposition to the government cemented by late July, and Lumumba increasingly relied on only a few advisers, and rarely consulted the full Council of Ministers; several members of the government began acting without his direction. He resorted to increasingly authoritarian measures to maintain control over the country.

On 5 September, President Joseph Kasa-Vubu dismissed Lumumba and six other members of the government. The dismissal order was countersigned by two ministers who disapproved of Lumumba's actions. Lumumba refused to leave office and contested with his replacement over control of the administration. Parliament reaffirmed its confidence in the Lumumba Government, resulting in a constitutional deadlock. On 14 September, Colonel Joseph-Désiré Mobutu launched a coup that definitively removed Lumumba from power and installed his own regime. Lumumba was later murdered, and the constitutional crisis created by his removal remained unresolved until 1961.

== Background ==
=== Belgian rule of the Congo ===
Map of Africa with the Democratic Republic of the Congo's modern borders

The Congo Free State was established in 1885 as the private domain of King Leopold II of Belgium. By the turn of the century, however, the violence of Free State officials against indigenous Congolese had brought intense diplomatic pressure on Belgium to take official control of the country, which it did in 1908, creating the Belgian Congo. The colony was divided into six provinces: Léopoldville, Équateur, Orientale, Kivu, Kasai, and Katanga. The city of Léopoldville was designated as the capital in 1923.

Belgian rule in the Congo was based around the "colonial trinity" (trinité coloniale) of state, missionary and private company interests. The privileging of Belgian commercial interests meant that capital sometimes flowed back into the Congo and that individual regions became specialised. The country was split into nesting, hierarchically organised administrative subdivisions, and run uniformly. As early as the 1920s, the Congo possessed one of the densest colonial regimes in Africa. The administration was heavily involved in the life of the Congolese; Belgian functionaries closely monitored and enforced agricultural production, provided medical services to many residents, and frequently toured even the most rural territories to oversee their subjects. There was also a high degree of racial segregation between the native and white populations, the latter of which grew considerably after the end of World War II due to immigration from Europe.

=== Rise in Congolese political activity ===
During the latter stages of World War II a new social stratum emerged in the Congo, known as the évolués. Forming an African middle class in the colony, they held skilled positions (such as clerks and nurses) made available by the economic boom. Most évolués sought to use their unique status to earn special privileges in the Congo. Since opportunities for upward mobility through the colonial structure were limited, the évolué class institutionally manifested itself in social clubs. Additional groups, such as labour unions, alumni associations, and ethnic syndicates, provided other Congolese the means of organisation. Among the most important of these was the Alliance des Bakongo (ABAKO), representing the Kongo people of the Lower Congo.

In 1954 ABAKO was taken over by Joseph Kasa-Vubu, and under his leadership it became increasingly hostile to the colonial authority and sought autonomy for the Kongo regions in the Lower Congo. A group of Congolese intellectuals issued a manifesto in 1956 that called for a transition to independence over the course of 30 years. The ABAKO quickly responded with a demand for "immediate independence". The Belgian government was not prepared to grant the Congo independence, and even when it started realising the necessity of a plan for decolonisation in 1957, it was assumed that such a process would be solidly controlled by Belgium. In December that year the colonial administration instituted reforms that permitted municipal elections and the formation of political parties. Nationalism increased in 1958 as more évolués began interacting with others outside of their own locales and started discussing the future structures of a post-colonial Congolese state. Nevertheless, most political mobilisation occurred along tribal and regional divisions. In Katanga, various tribal groups came together to form the Confédération des associations tribales du Katanga (CONAKAT) under the leadership of Godefroid Munongo and Moïse Tshombe. Hostile to immigrant peoples, it advocated provincial autonomy and close ties with Belgium. Most of its support was rooted in individual chiefs, businessmen, and European settlers of southern Katanga. It was opposed by Jason Sendwe's Association Générale des Baluba du Katanga (BALUBAKAT).

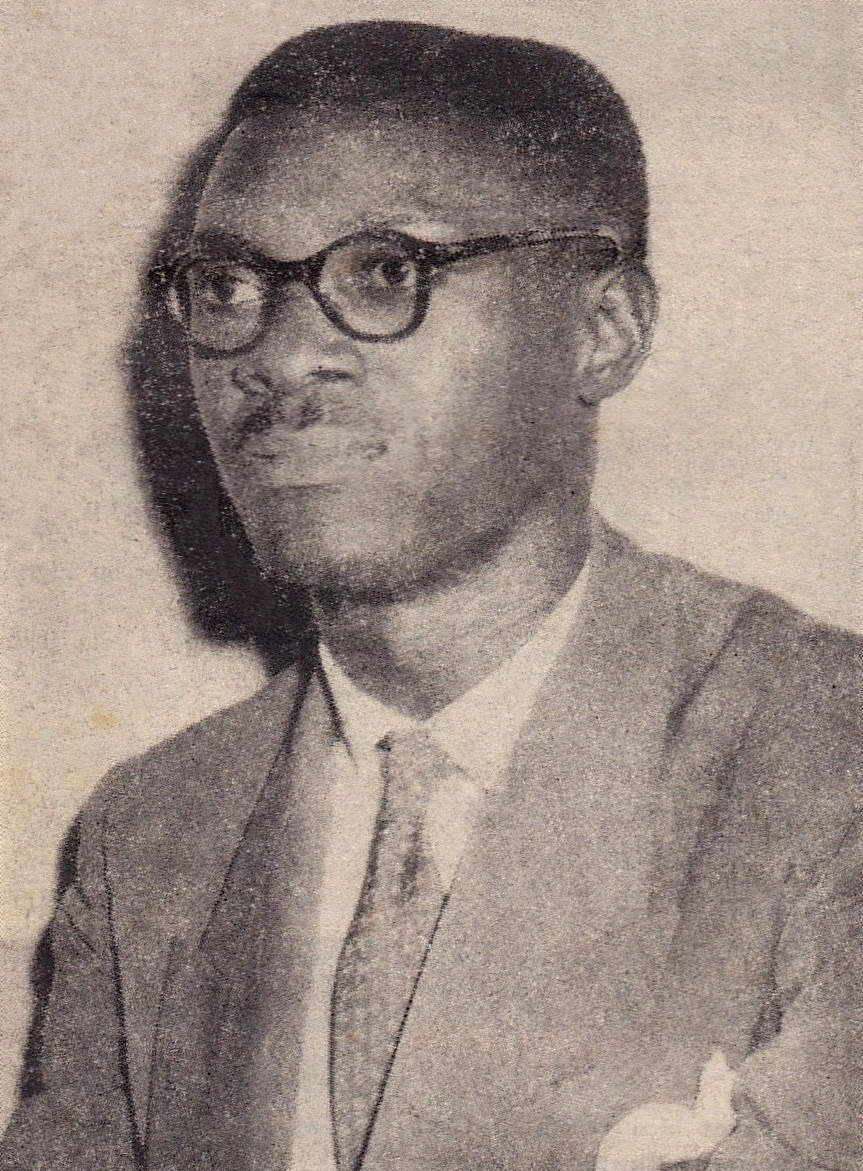
Patrice Lumumba, founding member and leader of the MNC

In October 1958 a group of Léopoldville évolués including Patrice Lumumba, Cyrille Adoula and Joseph Iléo established the Mouvement National Congolais (MNC). Diverse in membership, the party sought to peacefully achieve Congolese independence, promote the political education of the populace, and eliminate regionalism. The MNC drew most of its membership from the residents of the eastern city of Stanleyville and from the population of the Kasai Province, where efforts were directed by a Muluba businessman, Albert Kalonji. Belgian officials appreciated its moderate and anti-separatist stance and allowed Lumumba to attend the All-African Peoples' Conference in Accra, Ghana, in December 1958. Lumumba was deeply impressed by the Pan-Africanist ideals of Ghanaian President Kwame Nkrumah and returned to the Congo with a more radical party programme, demanding the country's "genuine" independence. Fearing that they were being overshadowed by Lumumba and the MNC, Kasa-Vubu and the ABAKO leadership announced that they would be hosting a rally in the capital on 4 January 1959. The municipal government issued a de facto ban on the event. ABAKO supporters were infuriated and, at the scheduled time of the rally, initiated three days of violent and destructive riots. The Force Publique (the colonial army) suppressed the revolt with considerable brutality. On 13 January the Belgian King, Baudouin, declared that independence would be granted to the Congo in the future.

Meanwhile, discontent surfaced among the MNC leadership, who were bothered by Lumumba's domination over the party's politics. Relations between Lumumba and Kalonji also grew tense, as the former was upset with how the latter was transforming the Kasai branch into an exclusively Luba group and antagonising other tribes. This culminated in the split of the party into the MNC-Lumumba/MNC-L under Lumumba and the MNC-Kalonji/MNC-K under Kalonji and Iléo. The latter began advocating federalism. Adoula left the organisation altogether. Alone to lead his own faction and facing competition from ABAKO, Lumumba became increasingly strident in his demands for independence. He was arrested following a riot in Stanleyville; nevertheless, his influence and that of the MNC-L continued to grow rapidly. The party advocated for a strong unitary state, nationalism, and the termination of Belgian rule and began forming alliances with regional groups, such as the Kivu-based Centre du Regroupement Africain (CEREA). Though the Belgians supported a unitary system over the federal models suggested by ABAKO and CONAKAT, they and more moderate Congolese were unnerved by Lumumba's increasingly extremist attitudes. With the implicit support of the colonial administration, the moderates formed the Parti National du Progrès (PNP) under the leadership of Paul Bolya and Albert Delvaux. It advocated centralisation, respect for traditional elements, and close ties with Belgium. In southern Léopoldville Province, a socialist-federalist party, the Parti Solidaire Africain (PSA), was founded with Antoine Gizenga as its president.

=== The Belgo-Congolese Round Table Conference ===
After the riots of 4 January 1959 Belgian leaders became increasingly fearful of a violent political conflict emerging in the Congo. The security situation in the country deteriorated over the course of the year, especially in the Lower Congo and in Kasai. Fearing the degeneration of the unrest into a colonial war and facing intense pressure for reform, in late 1959 the Belgian government announced that it would host a round table conference in Brussels in 1960 with the Congolese leadership to discuss the political future of the country.

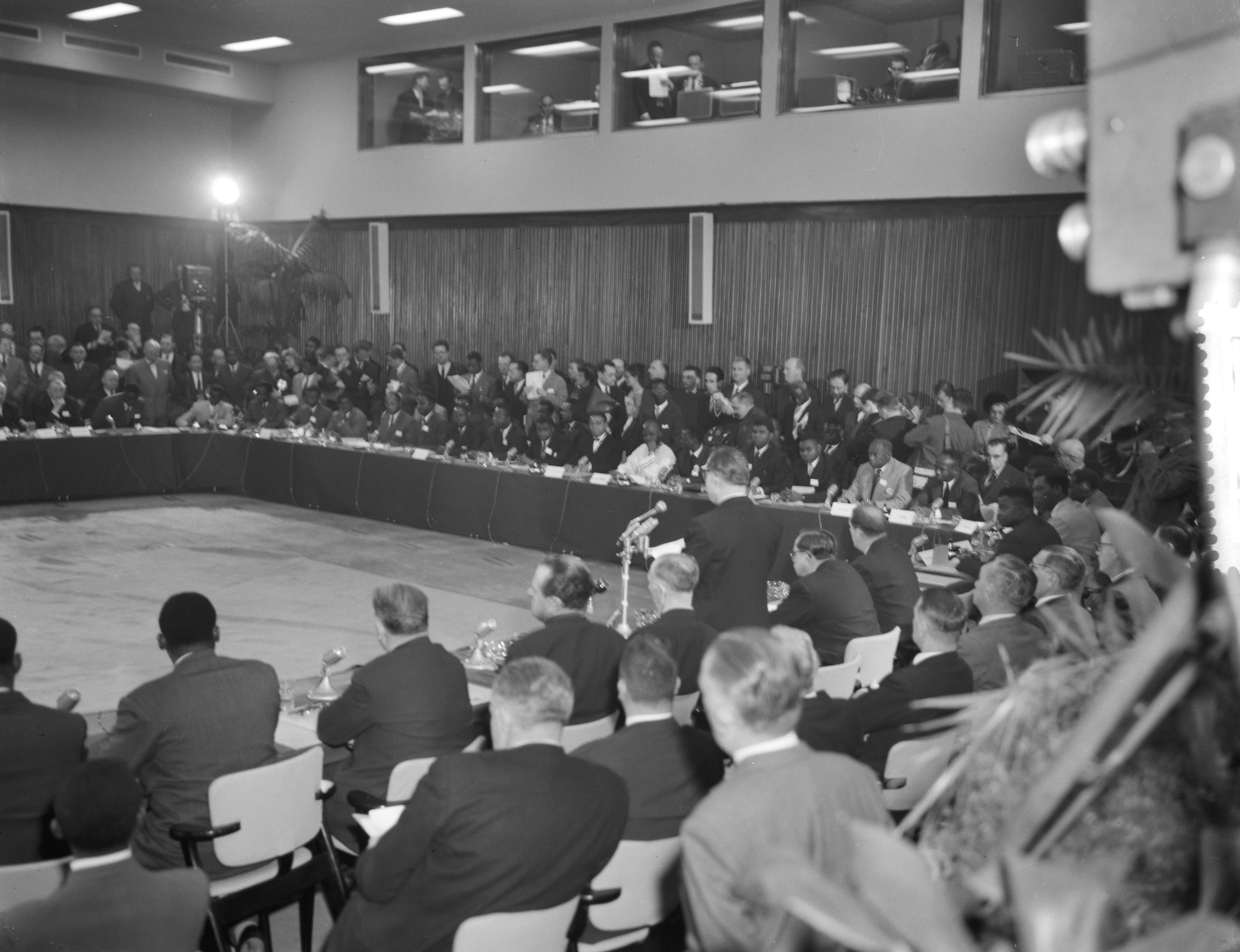
Opening meeting of the Belgo-Congolese Round Table Conference on 20 January 1960

The round table conference formally opened on 20 January. In the first speech, the Belgian Prime Minister assured that the Congo would be granted independence but did not specify a date. Kasa-Vubu demanded that a Congolese government be formed immediately, but his request was denied. Disagreements between him and the Belgians over the competence of the conference led to Kasa-Vubu walking out during the negotiations. His uncompromising style caused a split with ABAKO vice president Daniel Kanza. Lumumba, meanwhile, was released from prison and flew to Brussels to participate in the conference. On 27 January he made his first appearance and voiced his support for independence. After some discussion, the Congolese accepted the date of 30 June 1960 for sovereignty to be granted. Questions over whether Belgium would retain any responsibilities after independence for a transitional period were resolved by a committee, which recommended that all powers should be conferred upon the Congolese state and any technical assistance should be agreed upon through a treaty. The decisions of the delegates were ratified in a series of resolutions on 19 February and the conference closed the following day.

One of the resolutions called for another conference to be held to negotiate the economic transition of the Congo. The conference opened on 20 April. Most of the Congolese attendees of the earlier round table were occupied by domestic political affairs and did not attend. The conference dissolved without the Congolese making many serious guarantees, though they obtained for the Congolese state a large number of shares in the Union Minière du Haut Katanga (UMHK), a highly profitable mining company.

=== The Loi Fondamentale ===
It was decided at the Round Table Conference that the resolutions the participants adopted would serve as the basis for the Loi Fondamentale (Fundamental Law), a temporary draft constitution left for the Congo until a permanent one could be promulgated by a Congolese parliament. The division of executive power between a presumably symbolic head of state and head of government was the most noticeable and potentially harmful feature borrowed from the Belgian constitution. As in a parliamentary system, such power was to be exercised by a prime minister and a cabinet responsible to Parliament. If the cabinet lost the confidence of Parliament, a motion of censure would be passed (either with a simple majority in both houses of a two-thirds majority in a single house) and it would be dismissed. By comparison, the head of state (a President) was irresponsible and only had the power to ratify treaties, promulgate laws, and nominate high-ranking officials (including the Prime Minister and the cabinet). In Belgium, parliamentary tradition had rendered these duties inconsequential in the face of the premier's influence. (Note: Researchers of the Belgium-based Centre de recherche et d'information socio-politiques, Belgian law professor François Perin, Scheyven, and De Witte, among others, concluded that the author of the Loi Fondamentale had intended for the head of state to be a symbolic office, with real authority exercised by the parliamentary regime.) In the Congo, no such convention had been established. The Loi Fondamentale defined the government as solely "the Prime Minister and the Ministers"; the office of the President was regarded as a separate institution.

A parliament was to be composed of a lower chamber, the Chamber of Deputies, and an upper chamber, the Senate. Senators and deputies that assumed a ministerial post in the central government were allowed to retain their seats in Parliament. A state commissioner would be appointed by the head of state with the consent of the Senate to represent the central government in each province. Their main duties were to "administer state services" and "assure coordination of provincial and central institutions."

The constitution delineated the authority of the central and provincial governments. Among the central government's duties and responsibilities were foreign affairs, national defence, domestic security, customs and currency, communications, major public works, higher education, national judiciary, and economic planning. In areas where the provincial and central governments took contradictory stances, the central government's positions took precedence. The division of authority, a compromise between the federalist and unitarianist politicians, was dubbed by Belgian lawyers as "quasi-federalism". The Loi Fondamentale was a complicated and cumbersome document for the politically inexperienced Congolese.

=== The General Executive College ===
One of the resolutions adopted at the Political Round Table called for the establishment of a Collège Exécutive Général (General Executive College), a body composed of six Congolese—one from each province—designed to share power with the Governor-general until independence. They were as follows: Rémy Mwamba for Katanga, Joseph Kasa-Vubu for Léopoldville, Patrice Lumumba for Orientale, Paul Bolya for Équateur, Pierre Nyanguyle for Kasaï, and Anicet Kashamura for Kivu. The members of the college did not hold direct responsibility over any departments.

=== General Elections of 1960 ===
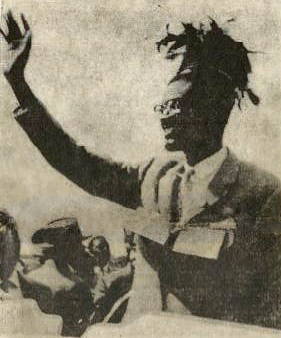
Lumumba waves to his supporters in Stanleyville

Even though the date for independence had been established at the Round Table Conference, there was still substantial uncertainty throughout the Congo as to which faction would come to dominate politics in the new government. This caused deep anxiety among most of the electorate. The official electoral campaign began on 11 May, marred by confusion and violence. With the notable exceptions of CONAKAT, the PNP, and the Parti de l'Unité Nationale (PUNA), most parties' rhetoric was anti-colonial in focus. Frequent attacks on the colonial administration by candidates led to confusion among segments of the electorate, which were given the impression that all forms of government—except welfare services—were to be eliminated after independence. The MNC-L and the PNP were the only parties to launch significant national campaigns.

=== Election results ===
==== Chamber of Deputies ====
The results for the Chamber of Deputies were as follows:

Party	Seats
Mouvement National Congolais-Lumumba	41
Parti Solidaire Africain	13
Centre du Regroupement Africain	10
Cartel Katangais	7
Alliance des Bakongo	12
Parti de l'Unité Nationale	7
Union des Mongo	1
Mouvement National Congolais-Kalonji	8
Parti National du Progrès	15
Confédération des associations tribales du Katanga	8
Other	15
Total	137

==== Senate ====
The results for the Senate were as follows:

Party	Seats
Mouvement National Congolais-Lumumba	19
Parti Solidaire Africain	4
Centre du Regroupement Africain	6
Cartel Katangais	3
Alliance des Bakongo	4
Parti de l'Unité Nationale	7
Union des Mongo	4
Mouvement National Congolais-Kalonji	3
Parti National du Progrès	3
Confédération des associations tribales du Katanga	6
Other	27
Total	84

==== Reactions ====
After the results were announced, Lumumba stated, "I am ready to co-operate with our opponents to from a national union government." Belgium was surprised by the MNC-L's electoral success. Belgians who had anticipated a PNP-led government were aghast at the prospect of Lumumba leading an independent Congo. Many members of the various foreign missions in the Congo, however, believed that he was the only man capable of bringing order and stability to the country. Luluabourg, the provincial capital of Kasai, was designated the provisional seat of Parliament—and by probable extension, the new government—but ethnic violence between the Baluba and Lulua in Kasai led the authorities to remain in Léopoldville.

== Formation ==
=== Appointment of a formateur ===
Articles 47 and 48 of the Loi Fondamentale dictated how the first Congolese government was to be formed. In accordance with them, The King of the Belgians would consult with the major political forces that emerged after elections and appoint a formateur (former) who would then create a government "likely to obtain the confidence of [P]arliament". On the advice of the formateur, the King would appoint the Prime Minister and the suggested ministers. Within three days of the nomination the government would have to receive a vote of confidence from both houses of Parliament (in this case, 69 votes in from the Chamber and 43 votes from the Senate would be required). The Belgians hoped a moderate alliance would materialise to oppose the MNC-L, so they would not have to give Lumumba the premiership. An anti-MNC-L coalition did form; it principally consisted of the PNP, PUNA, and the MNC-K led by Jean Bolikango (of PUNA), Kalonji, and Iléo (both of MNC-K). Kasa-Vubu aligned himself with the opposition but refused to become its leader. The loyalties of other parties were unsure, and the whole situation was complicated by the divided opinions within the parties themselves. Meanwhile, Lumumba, mindful of his plurality in the Chamber and busy trying to confirm the support of other parties, demanded to be made formateur.

Negotiations on the composition of the first government began on 31 May though a formateur had still not been selected. Belgium had committed itself to 30 June for independence and risked embarrassing itself in the international community if it proceeded without the Congo having its own government. Walter Ganshof van der Meersch was charged with advising Baudouin on the selection of a formateur. On 12 June he appointed Lumumba to be informateur (informer), tasked with investigating the possibility of forming a national unity government that included politicians with a wide range of views, with 16 June as his deadline. The same day as Lumumba's appointment, the parliamentary opposition coalition, the Cartel d'Union Nationale was announced. Though Kasa-Vubu was aligned with their beliefs, he remained distanced from them. The MNC-L was also having trouble securing the allegiances of the PSA, CEREA, and BALUBAKAT. The cartel members refused to work with Lumumba. On 16 June Lumumba reported his difficulties to Ganshof, who then extended the deadline and promised to act as an intermediary between the MNC leader and the opposition. However, once he had made contact with the cartel leadership, he was impressed by their obstinacy and assurances of a strong anti-Lumumba polity. He also faced increasing pressure from Belgian and moderate Congolese advisers to end Lumumba's assignment.

On the following day Ganshof declared that Lumumba had failed to fulfill his role, and terminated his mission. Acting on Ganshof's advice, Baudouin then named Kasa-Vubu formateur. (Note: Ganshof briefly considered recommending Cyrille Adoula for the role, but ultimately decided against it after considering Adoula's lack of popular support and his own decision to keep away from national debate.) Lumumba responded by threatening to form his own government and present it to Parliament without official approval. He subsequently announced the creation of a "popular" government with the support of Pierre Mulele of the PSA. Meanwhile, Kasa-Vubu, like Lumumba, was completely unable to communicate with his political opponents. The decision to appoint him formateur rallied the PSA, CEREA, and BALUBAKAT to Lumumba, making it unlikely that he could form a government that would survive a vote of confidence. This was confirmed when the Chamber met on 21 June to select its officers; Joseph Kasongo of the MNC-L was made president with 74 votes (a majority), while the two vice presidencies were secured by the PSA and CEREA candidates, both of whom had the support of Lumumba. With time running out before independence, Baudouin took new advice from Ganshof and made Lumumba formateur. The following day the Senate convened to elect its officers. Though Iléo won the presidency, the two vice presidencies were awarded to BALUBAKAT and the MNC-L.

=== Selection of members ===
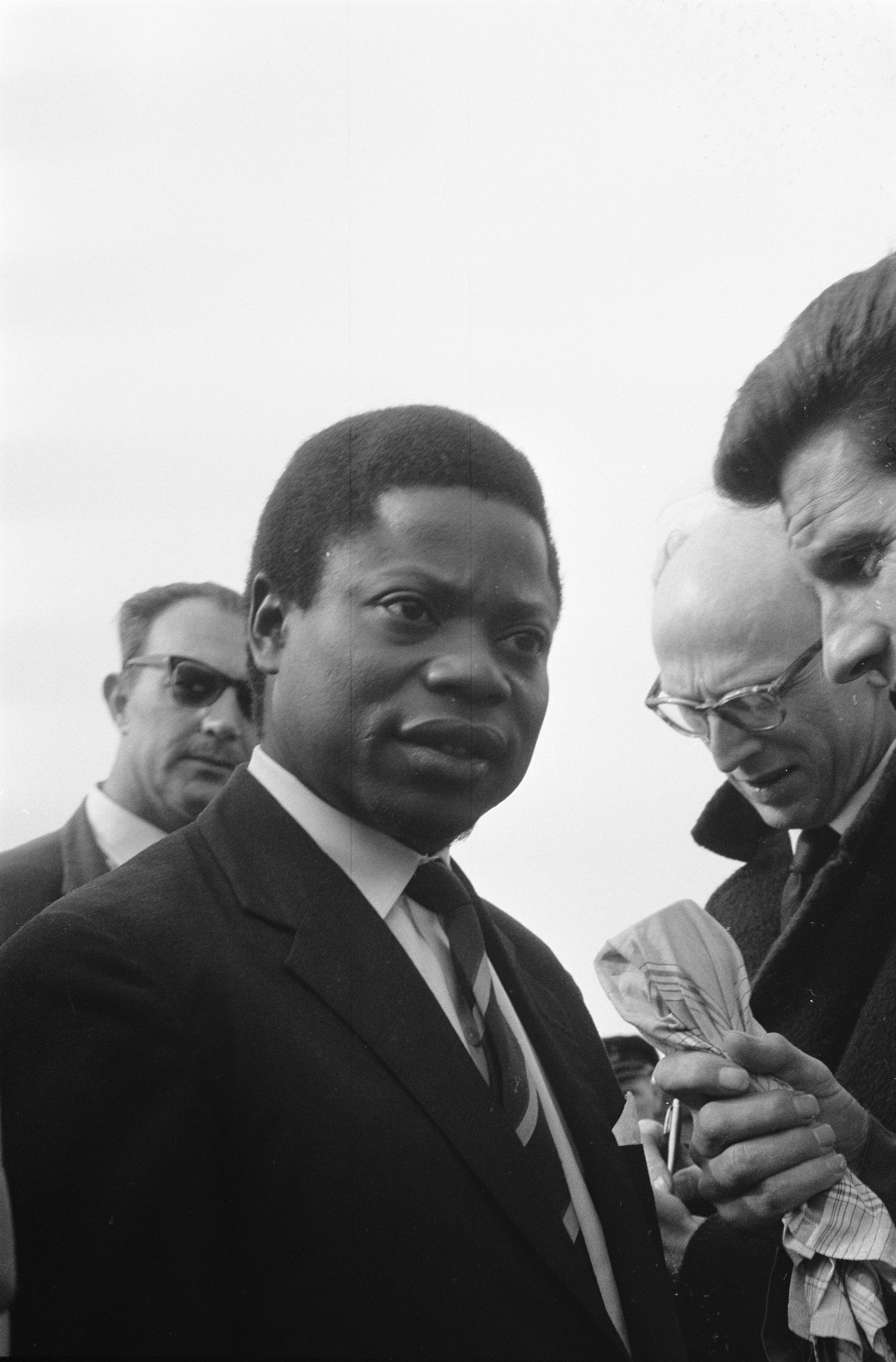
Justin Bomboko, selected by Lumumba after some hesitation to be Minister of Foreign Affairs

Once it was apparent that Lumumba's bloc controlled Parliament, several members of the opposition became eager to negotiate for a coalition government so they could share power. Among these were Bolikango, Delvaux, and Bolya. Their quest for compromise undermined the strength of the anti-MNC-L alliance. By 22 June (shortly before the vote on the Senate's officers) Lumumba's government, headed by himself in the post of prime minister, included members of the MNC-L, the PSA, CEREA, BALUBAKAT, and the Fédération des Association de Ressortissments du Kasaï au Katanga (FEDEKA, a party in a cartel with BALUBAKAT). However, negotiations continued between Lumumba and Bolikango, Delvaux, and Kasa-Vubu. Lumumba reportedly offered ABAKO the ministerial positions for Foreign Affairs and Middle Classes, but Kasa-Vubu instead demanded the Ministry of Finance, a minister of state, the Secretary of State for the Interior, and a written pledge of support from the MNC-L and its allies for his presidential candidacy. Lumumba weighed his options for the Minister of Foreign Affairs between Thomas Kanza (Daniel Kanza's son), André Mandi, and Justin Bomboko. He mistrusted Bomboko, whom the Belgians supported and with whom he had political differences. Kanza, who was well acquainted with Bomboko, suggested that he himself be made Delegate to the United Nations (UN) with ministerial status, so he could operate with autonomy, while Bomboko should receive charge of Foreign Affairs, because he was an elected deputy and had more political support. Lumumba eventually agreed to this proposal, while Mandi was made Secretary of State for Foreign Affairs.

By the morning of 23 June, the government was, in the words of Lumumba, "practically formed". At noon, he made a counter-offer to Kasa-Vubu, who instead responded with a letter demanding the creation of a seventh province for the Bakongo. Lumumba refused to comply and instead pledged to support Bolikango in his bid for the Presidency. At 14:45 he presented his proposed government before the press. Both ABAKO and the MNC-K were absent from its composition, while the only PSA members were from Gizenga's wing of the party. The Bakongo of Léopoldville were deeply upset by their exclusion from Lumumba's cabinet. They subsequently demanded the removal of the PSA-dominated provincial government and called for a general strike to begin the following morning. At 16:00 Lumumba and Kasa-Vubu resumed negotiations. Kasa-Vubu eventually agreed to Lumumba's earlier offer, though Lumumba informed him that he could not give him a guarantee of support in his presidential candidacy.

As result of the negotiations with Kasa-Vubu, the cabinet was reshuffled to include an ABAKO Minister of Finance. In turn, the suggested Minister of Finance assumed the responsibility of Economic Coordination. The minister unseated by the change inherited the Ministry of Land Affairs, which was split off from the Ministry of Mines. A member of PUNA took over the Ministry of Social Affairs, which was broken off of the Ministry of Labour. ABAKO earned one minister of state and secretary of state. The Secretary of State for the Interior was transferred to the Secretariat for Finance, while PUNA was entrusted with one minister of state. According to Kanza, Jacques Lumbala and Joseph-Désiré Mobutu held much influence in the final determination of Lumumba's government. Baudouin also formally decreed Lumumba to be prime minister.

== Composition ==
The government consisted of the following individuals: (Note: Individuals without a party listed next to their name had no known party affiliation. Though not part of the government proper, Lumumba's suggested appointees for state commissioners were announced at the same time as the ministers, ministers of state, and secretaries of state. They were: State Commissioner for Léopoldville Sylvain Kama (PSA), State Commissioner for Équateur Tamusu Fumu, State Commissioner for Kasaï Isaac Kalonji (FEDEKA), State Commissioner for Katanga Jason Sendwe (BALUBAKAT), State Commissioner for Kivu Hubert Sangara, State Commissioner for Orientale Christophe Muzungu (MNC-L).)

=== Ministers ===
1. Prime Minister and Minister of National Defence Patrice Lumumba (MNC-L)
2. Deputy Prime Minister Antoine Gizenga (PSA)
3. Minister of Foreign Affairs Justin Bomboko (UNIMO)
4. Minister of External Commerce Marcel Bisukiro (CEREA)
5. Minister Resident in Belgium Albert Delvaux (PNP-LUKA)
6. Minister of Justice Rémy Mwamba (BALUBAKAT)
7. Minister-Delegate to the United Nations Thomas Kanza
8. Minister of the Interior Christophe Gbenye (MNC-L)
9. Minister of Finance Pascal Nkayi (ABAKO)
10. Minister of Economic Coordination and Planning Aloïs Kabangi (MNC-L)
11. Minister of Public Works Alphonse Ilunga (UNC)
12. Minister of Agriculture Joseph Lutula (MNC-L)
13. Minister of Communications Alphonse Songolo (MNC-L)
14. Minister of Economic Affairs Joseph Yav (CONAKAT)
15. Minister of Labour Joseph Masena (PSA)
16. Minister of Public Health Grégoire Kamanga (COAKA)
17. Minister of Mines and Power Edmond Rudahindwa (REKO)
18. Minister of Social Affairs Antoine Ngwenza (PUNA)
19. Minister of Information and Cultural Affairs Anicet Kashamura (CEREA)
20. Minister of Youth and Sports Maurice Mpolo (MNC-L)
21. Minister of the Middle Classes Joseph Mbuyi (MNC-L)
22. Minister of National Education and Fine Arts Pierre Mulele (PSA)
23. Minister of Land Affairs Alexandre Mahamba (MNC-L)

=== Ministers of state (Note: The ministers of state held ministerial rank but no portfolios.) ===
1. Georges Grenfell (MNC-L)
2. Charles Kisolokele (ABAKO)
3. Paul Bolya (PNP/UNIMO)
4. André Ngenge (PUNA)

=== Secretaries of state ===
1. Secretary of State to the Presidency Joseph-Désiré Mobutu (MNC-L) (Note: Mobutu was replaced by Marcel Lengema after he was appointed chief of staff of the army.)
2. Secretary of State to the Presidency Jacques Lumbala (PNP)
3. Secretary of State for External Commerce Antoine Kiwewa (MNC-L)
4. Secretary of State for Finance André Tshibangu
5. Secretary of State for Justice Maximilien Liongo
6. Secretary of State for Foreign Affairs André Mandi
7. Secretary of State for the Interior Raphael Batshikama (ABAKO)
8. Secretary of State for Defence Albert Nyembo (CONAKAT)
9. Secretary of State for Information and Cultural Affairs Antoine-Roger Bolamba (MNC-L)
10. Secretary of State for Economic Coordination and Planning Alphonse Nguvulu (PP)

== Analyses ==
The 37-strong Lumumba Government was very diverse, with its members coming from different classes, different tribes, and holding varied political beliefs. Though many had questionable loyalty to Lumumba, most did not openly contradict him out of political considerations or fear of reprisal. He dominated the Council of Ministers, and most of the ministers did respect his abilities. Of the members of the ministerial cabinet, only Kanza and Bomboko had university educations while Yav was completing his studies in Brussels. Nineteen of the ministers had worked as clerks, two as medical assistants, one as a teacher, and one other professionally in the private sector (Kanza had worked with the European Economic Community). Lumumba, Bolya, Nkayi, Rudahindwa, Nguvulu, Mandi, and Liongo were all members of the Association du Personnel Indigene de la Colonie (APIC) labour union. Fourteen of the ministers were openly left-leaning, including Gizenga, Mulele, and Gbenye. Gizenga, Mulele, Kashamura, and Bisukiro had connections with foreign leftists—mostly African nationalists—and harboured a more programmatic approach to their politics, probably due to the disaffection of farmers in their constituencies. Yav, Bomboko, and Bolamba were all known Belgian protégés, while Rudahindwa worked at the behest of the white settlers of Kivu. Nyembo used his position as Secretary of State for Defence to spy on the department's activities for Tshombe, who had secured office as the President of Katanga Province. Most of the members of the government, aside from Bomboko, Kanza, and Mandi, were ignorant of international affairs and Cold War dynamics. Mandi's place as the Secretary of State for Foreign Affairs allowed him to monitor Bomboko's activities for Lumumba. As Minister of Youth and Sports, Mpolo was in a position to act as the government's primary propagandist. Charles Kisolokele was chosen to be ABAKO's minister of state because he was a practicing member of Kimbanguism. Lumumba probably hoped that through the appointment he could earn the allegiance of the rest of the Kimbaguist members of ABAKO, thereby dividing the party.

MNC-L members controlled eight ministries, including four major portfolios: national defence, interior, economic coordination, and agriculture. Tshombe objected to the fact that the former two were held by MNC-L members, while the majority of PUNA and MNC-K members were extremely displeased that their party leaders had not been included in the government. Lumumba failed to prevent dissidence by giving ABAKO and CONAKAT, parties both in control of regions with autonomous tendencies, a more secondary role in his government. European circles were displeased that the portfolio for economic affairs, controlled by a CONAKAT member, was undercut by the positioning of nationalists in control of the Ministry and Secretariat for Economic Coordination, and that mines and land affairs were placed under separate portfolios. Tshombe declared that it rendered his agreement to support the government "null and void".

== Investiture ==
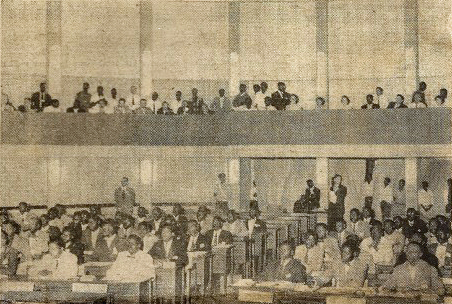
The Chamber of Deputies in session to vote on the Lumumba Government

At 22:40 on 23 June, the Chamber of Deputies convened in the Palais de la Nation to vote on Lumumba's government. Lumumba addressed the deputies, promising to maintain national unity, abide by the will of the people, and pursue a neutralist foreign policy. The Chamber proceeded to engage in a heated debate. Though the government contained members from parties that held 120 of the 137 seats, reaching a majority was not a straightforward task. While several leaders of the opposition had been involved in the formative negotiations, their parties as a whole had not been consulted. Furthermore, some individuals were upset they had not been included in the government and sought to personally prevent its investiture. In the subsequent arguments, multiple deputies expressed dissatisfaction at the lack of representation of their respective provinces and/or parties, with several threatening secession. Among them was Kalonji, who said he would encourage people of Kasaï to refrain from participating in the central government and form their own autonomous state.

When a vote was finally taken, only 80 of the 137 members of the Chamber were present. Of these, 74 voted in favor of the government, five against, and one abstained. The 57 absences were almost all voluntary. Though the government had earned just as many votes as when Kasongo won the presidency of the Chamber, the support was not congruent; members of the moderate wing of the PSA had voted against the government while a few members of the PNP, PUNA, and ABAKO, and a single CONAKAT deputy voted in favor of it. Overall, the vote was a disappointment for the MNC-L coalition. The session was adjourned at 02:05 on 24 June.

The Senate convened that day to vote on the government. There was another heated debate, in which Iléo and Adoula expressed their strong dissatisfaction with its composition. CONAKAT members abstained from voting. When arguments concluded, a decisive vote of approval was taken on the government: 60 voted in favor, 12 against, while eight abstained. All dissident arguments for alternative cabinets, particularly Kalonji's demand for a new administration, were rendered impotent and the Lumumba Government was officially invested. With the institution of a broad coalition, the parliamentary opposition was officially reduced to only the MNC-K and some individuals. The Soviet Union was pleased by the composition of the government and made several overtures to Lumumba to try and secure his favor, while United States officials were unsure how to respond.

== Tenure ==
=== Election of the Head of State ===
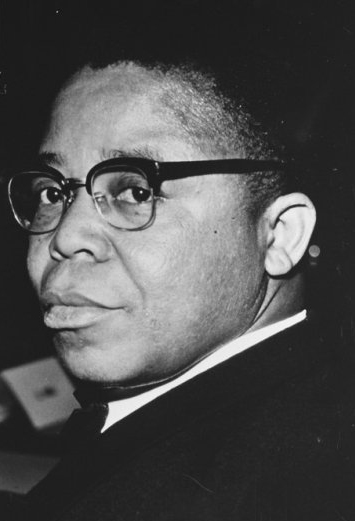
Joseph Kasa-Vubu, elected the first President of the Republic of the Congo

According to the Loi Fondamentale, Parliament had to meet to elect the head of state within 48 hours of the appointments of the presiding officers of each chamber. Bolikango and Kasa-Vubu were the only two declared candidates. Lumumba had promised to support the former in the election in exchange for PUNA's support for his government's investiture. Afterward he secretly instructed the nationalist parliamentarians to vote for Kasa-Vubu, figuring that this would please the most pressure groups and appease the ABAKO constituency, which many feared would effect a secession of the Lower Congo. Mpolo thought electing Kasa-Vubu would be a mistake and sought to postpone the vote to give Lumumba time to reconsider his decision. During the session he took the floor and suggested that, in light of heightened tensions between Bolikango's and Kasa-Vubu's supporters, the assembly be adjourned to facilitate further discussions between the political parties on their candidates of choice. Confused by the proposal, Kasongo (who was presiding) asked if it had been made on behalf of the government. Displeased, Lumumba indicated that it was not. Instead of using his power to adjourn, Kasongo deferred to the assembly, which decided to proceed with the election. Thomas Kanza coaxed Lumumba to step outside of the chamber where he, his father, and Mpolo attempted in vain to change his mind. Lumumba refused to alter his decision on the grounds that ABAKO members would revolt and that, in his personal opinion, Kasa-Vubu would make a better head of state. Kasa-Vubu won the vote, 150 to 43 with 11 abstentions.

The election of Kasa-Vubu brought about wide-ranging acceptance of the Congo's new administration. The Belgian press reacted positively to the development, while the Léopoldville's daily newspaper Courrier d'Afrique, edited by a Mukongo, showed much warmer approval of the government. However, it also solidified the oppositional alignment of PUNA, CONAKAT, and the MNC-K. Bolikango's supporters were infuriated by the result, as were many Bangala soldiers. Nevertheless, the discontent seemed to pose little threat to the Lumumba Government's operations or credibility, except in Kasai (in regard to the MNC-K). International opinion expressed satisfaction at the striking of a proper balance in leadership. Belgian politicians hoped that Kasa-Vubu would check Lumumba's impulses and personal disdain for Belgian policies. He was officially sworn in as president on 27 June.

=== Organising administration and preparations for independence ===
"The first meetings of our Council of Ministers (Note: The Council of Ministers was the ministerial cabinet. The ministers of state were included in its composition, but the secretaries of state were not.) were unforgettable. Our discussions were of the most desultory kind. All of us were happy, or at least cheerful and satisfied, at being ministers. It was play-acting; some of it pure comedy, some nearer to tragedy. We were ministers; we, the colonized, now had titles and dignity; but we had no power at all over any of the instruments we needed to carry out the functions expected of us. We argued about offices, about suitable and available sites for them, and how they should be shared among us. We discussed the allocation of ministerial cars; the choosing and allotting of ministerial residences; arrangements for our families and their travel...In short, we talked endlessly, laughed ourselves silly, and concluded by generally agreeing that the Belgian colonizers were to blame for all our troubles."

— Thomas Kanza, Minister-Delegate to the United Nations

At the onset of his premiership Lumumba had two main goals: ensure that independence would bring a legitimate improvement in the quality of life for the Congolese and unify the country in a centralised state by eliminating tribalism and regionalism. He was also worried that opposition to his government would appear rapidly and had to be managed quickly and decisively.

"The first Congolese government represented the culmination of the work of the independence movement...Lumumba's government intended to claim its rightful independence immediately and set out to combat all vestiges of colonialism and all forms of neocolonialism; he hoped to persuade the Congolese peoples to build a unified nation in a democratic state within the rule of law."

— Sociologist Ludo De Witte

To achieve the first aim, Lumumba figured a comprehensive "Africanisation" of the administration, in spite of its risks, would be necessary. There were 9,800 Belgian civil servants in the Congo, all of whom held senior positions. Of the 12,485 Congolese functionaries, only 637 held higher level posts. Of the top three grades in the civil service, only three posts were held by Congolese. The Belgians were opposed to Africanisation, as it would create inefficiency in the Congo's bureaucracy and lead to a mass exodus of unemployed civil servants which they would be unable to handle back in Europe. All the same the proposal could not be quickly enacted before independence; Lumumba was wary of a hasty reorganisation that would jeopardise the administration and reluctantly favored a slower transformation. He also considered the Africanisation of the territorial service to be important, but since the central government was preoccupied the task mostly fell to the responsibility of the provincial authorities.

Seeking another gesture that might excite the Congolese people, Lumumba proposed to the Belgian government a reduction in sentences for all prisoners and an amnesty for those serving a term of three years or less. Ganshof feared that such an action would jeopardise law and order and he evaded taking any action until it was too late to fulfill the request. Lumumba's opinion of the Belgians was further soured by the affair, which also contributed to his fear that independence would not appear "real" for the average Congolese. He was also wary of the continued dominance of the Catholic Church in Congolese affairs, but declared that his government would support freedom of religion and the separation of church and state. Though he was optimistic about his opportunity to govern, he was disappointed by the fact that his government—composed of inexperienced men and so hastily established—could not function properly and that he had to work with many politicians who opposed his agenda.

Meanwhile, the Council of Ministers held its first meetings. Most of the cabinet was concerned about the formalities that were to be in play during independence ceremonies and, following an appeal for advice to the Belgian Foreign Ministry, they adopted an order of precedence that was nearly identical to the system used in Belgium. Ministers also concerned themselves with housing, and several visited Belgian officials at their homes in search of prospective residences. Lumumba was unable to move himself and his staff into his designated residence and offices until the Belgian Governor-general vacated the premises on 5 July.

"The functioning of the first Congolese government seemed to me from the first to be bizarre and unique; though excusable in view of its members' lack of experience, organization, equipment, coordination, of almost everything."

— Thomas Kanza

The establishment of the new administration was mired with substantial confusion. The Belgians had expected 10 ministers, not 23 (of whom 20 held responsibility over a unique ministry), so most departments had to be divided. As a result, many ministers were confused as to the location of their offices, the composition of their staffs, and the scope of their responsibilities. Organisational charts for the ministries were under evaluation as late as 28 June. The large number of departments also greatly fractured authority; social policy was shared between three ministries (Social Affairs, Labour, Youth and Sports) and economic policy was shared between four (Economic Affairs, Economic Coordination and Planning, External Commerce, Finance). The ministries were set up according to the Belgian model whereby each was split into two sections. The first consisted of a minister's personal cabinet of up to 12 members (for which no minimum qualifications were specified) under the charge of a chef de cabinet. The cabinets' establishment was the primary concern of ministers and their clientele and they were the only government organisations speedily instituted during the hand-over of authority. The second section of a ministry was composed of several departments led by a secretary-general. Tasked with advising a minister on "political" and "administrative" functions, respectively, the two branches were predisposed to coming into conflict over the duality of authority they held in their ministries. In the ministries that were established before independence the cabinet posts were mostly filled by loyal members of the responsible minister's party. A minority were held by Europeans, with exception of the seats in the Defence cabinet, which were completely occupied by Belgian officers. A handful of the secretariats were given to some of the few Congolese university graduates. In the confused political situation many ministers were mistrustful of others and made such appointments based on regional or tribal affiliations. Petty tribal, religious, and personal disputes among staff hampered the establishment of the administration. Three hundred Congolese personnel were sent to Belgium for training in various ministries (Note: It was originally intended that the trainees would stay in Belgium for up to six months, but most were recalled in July.) but very little changed in the lower levels of the administration; most clerks received the same salary as they had previously and were left under the control of the same Belgian civil servants. The ministries of Foreign Affairs, Youth and Sports, Education, and Information, relative to the other departments, were initially able to function under Congolese management. On the eve of independence the chief of the Sûreté Nationale (security police) was attached to the Prime Minister's office, allowing Lumumba to monitor the activities of Gbenye and Mwamba who both, acting in their respective capacities as Minister of Justice and Minister of Interior, had tried to cement their own control over the organisation.

With the independence of the country, the new government also inherited a complex financial situation. The political uncertainty of 1959 led to the overall withdrawal of over £90 million from the Congo by the private sector before the end of the year. In 1960 the flight of capital averaged £7 million a month until the Belgian authorities intervened. By then, the Central Bank of the Congo and Ruanda-Urundi had been drained to a point where it could no longer fulfill its financial obligations. To provide stability, the National Bank of Belgium agreed to back its operations. In return, the Central Bank transferred all of its gold and dollar reserves to Brussels and agreed that the Congo's monetary and fiscal policy would be decided upon by both institutions, greatly limiting the economic freedom of the new government. The Congolese were left in effect with no monetary authority and so could not issue currency or generate credit. The Belgians also persuaded several significant businesses to deposit a total of £17.5 million in the Congo's treasury (which had only £4.9 million in December 1959) as advance payments for future taxes, duties, and dividends. However, this action in-effect guaranteed that the country's future profits would meet its deficits, greatly jeopardising the future liquidity of the Congo's finances. A drop in world commodity prices starting in 1956 had decreased the profitability of the Congo, leading to three-and-a-half years of deficits, though the Belgians proposed subsidising it. Lumumba's government was also liable for a national debt of £350 million. Managing it was estimated to expend 24.2% of the Congo's 1960 budget, by far the largest debt burden of any relinquished African colony. However, this was somewhat alleviated by two factors. Firstly, most of it was incurred through development work. Secondly, the government assumed control over a portfolio of assets worth approximately £240 million, including a significant amount of shares of the UMHK and several important parastatals. In addition to the £13.5 million in servicing the debt, the 1960 second semester budget also called for an expenditure of £38 million in regular appropriations. It only provided for £28.5 million in receipts, so the Belgian subsidy (which was to come in monthly installments) was required to keep it balanced.

Flag of the "Republic of the Congo"

On 27 June the Lumumba Government convened and announced that the country would be known after independence as the Republic of the Congo. During the meeting a committee was established to draft a Treaty of Friendship, Assistance, and Co-operation to be signed with Belgium. It stipulated that the Belgian civil servants in the Congo and the Belgian officers of the Force Publique would remain at their posts and receive compensation from the Belgian government. (Note: The Belgian civil servants earned annual salaries ranging between 232,500 and BEF 465,000, which would place a significant burden on the Congolese government if not for the Belgian subsidy.) It also allowed for Belgian metropolitan troops to continue to garrison the bases of Kitona and Kamina until another agreement could arrange the installations' handover to the Congolese government. The text of the treaty was hurriedly finished and on 29 June the agreement was signed by Belgian Prime Minister Gaston Eyskens, Belgian Foreign Minister Pierre Wigny, Lumumba, and Bomboko. Most observers familiar with the Congolese situation believed that the new government would not, with so much technical assistance, really operate independently of Belgium and some feared that regardless of such support it would not be able to function effectively.

Meanwhile, foreign delegations arrived in the capital in advance of the Independence Day festivities. The Soviet gestures to Lumumba guaranteed a straightforward arrangement in their diplomatic relations with the Congolese government and an ambassador was assigned to attend the independence ceremony. More complicated negotiations regarding foreign relations took place with other states, such as Ghana. Congolese ministers were invited to an array of receptions, parties, and conferences. Their associations revealed the different factions in the government; some individuals heavily associated with the representatives of socialist countries or "progressive" Africans and Asians, while others only mingled with Westerners and their sympathisers. As these divisions surfaced, the ministers began to label each-other according to their beliefs; the categories ranged from socialist and anti-imperialist to reactionary and pro-Belgian. The ministers' names on the government list circulated among the press were increasingly appended by their respective party affiliation. This development, according to Kanza, led foreigners to pigeonhole ministers with their parties' beliefs.

=== Independence ===
"Thus, both within and without, the new Congo which my government creates will be a rich, free and prosperous country. But if we are to achieve this object quickly, I must ask all of you, legislators and citizens of the Congo, to do everything in your power to help me...Our government, strong, national, and popular, will be the salvation of this country."

— Extracts from Lumumba's independence speech, 30 June 1960

The Independence Day formalities were arranged by the Belgians. The itinerary began with an 11:00 ceremony at the Palais de la Nations, where King Baudouin and President Kasa-Vubu were due to deliver speeches. Kasa-Vubu's address, which was submitted to the Council of Ministers in advance for review, consisted of two parts. The first concerned the Congo's history and its future, while the second acted as a tribute to Baudouin. Lumumba was upset that he was not listed in the programme, and he secretly drafted his own speech with the assistance of Kanza and Mandi and informed Kasongo, who was to preside over the ceremony, of his intention to speak.

Baudouin's address was paternalistic in nature. He opened by celebrating the Congo's first Belgian colonists and Leopold II. He cautioned the Congolese not to make any sudden alterations to the institutions of government they were being given, encouraged them to be wary of foreign interference, and stated that they now had to show themselves worthy of being granted independence. The Congolese audience disliked the speech, and Kasa-Vubu omitted the tribute to Baudouin in his oration. Kasongo then called Lumumba to the podium. The Prime Minister delivered a charismatic, nationalist address which praised the Congolese independence movement and spoke toward the necessary sacrifices to be taken to improve the country. He highlighted the abuses the Congolese people had faced under colonial rule and stressed the importance of the Congo as a new African state. The Belgian press and population had an extremely negative reaction, and both believed the Prime Minister's speech was proof of a radical and anti-Western outlook. After the speech Lumumba and Bomboko signed the accords officially conferring sovereignty upon the Congo with their Belgian counterparts.

Independence Day and the three days that followed it were declared a national holiday. The Congolese were preoccupied by the festivities which occurred in relative peace. Meanwhile, Lumumba's and Gizenga's offices were overtaken by a flurry of activity. Lumumba, for his part, was mostly preoccupied with a lengthy itinerary of receptions and ceremonies. Bomboko, Kanza, and Mandi were busy attempting to organise the Ministry of Foreign Affairs. Bomboko was upset by the fact that most foreign contacts were made either through the entire government or through Lumumba, instead of directly through him.

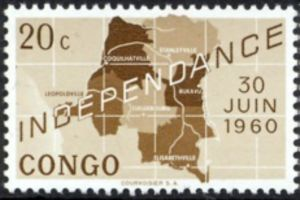
Stamp commemorating the independence of the Congo

On 1 July Lumumba sent a wire to the UN to request membership, stating that the Congo "accepts without reservation the obligations stipulated in the Charter of the UN and undertakes to abide by the same in absolute good faith." UN Secretary-General Dag Hammarskjöld cabled the Foreign Ministry, pointing out the difficulty in admitting the country into the UN under its name in the face of another application for membership from the neighboring Congo, preparing for independence from French control. A delegation was sent from Brazzaville to resolve the matter with Kanza and Mandi. Problems of mutual concern between the two countries were also discussed. In the end, it was decided that the former Belgian Congo would be recognised as the Republic of the Congo or Congo-Léopoldville while the former French Congo would be known as the Congolese Republic or Congo-Brazzaville. The Lumumba Government also signed the Third Geneva Convention.

On 3 July the government ordered the arrest of Kalonji's "rival" Kasai provincial government, precipitating unrest in Luluabourg. The following morning Lumumba convened the Council of Ministers to discuss the unrest among the troops of the Force Publique. The ministers resolved to establish four committees to study respectively the reorganisation of the administration, the judiciary, and the army, and the enacting of a new statute for state employees. All were to devote special attention to ending racial discrimination. Lumumba announced the decision over radio that evening. Parliament assembled for the first time since independence and took its first official legislative action by voting to greatly increase the salaries of its members. Lumumba, fearing the repercussions the raise would have on the budget, was among the few to object, dubbing it a "ruinous folly".

=== Mutiny of the Force Publique and the Belgian intervention ===
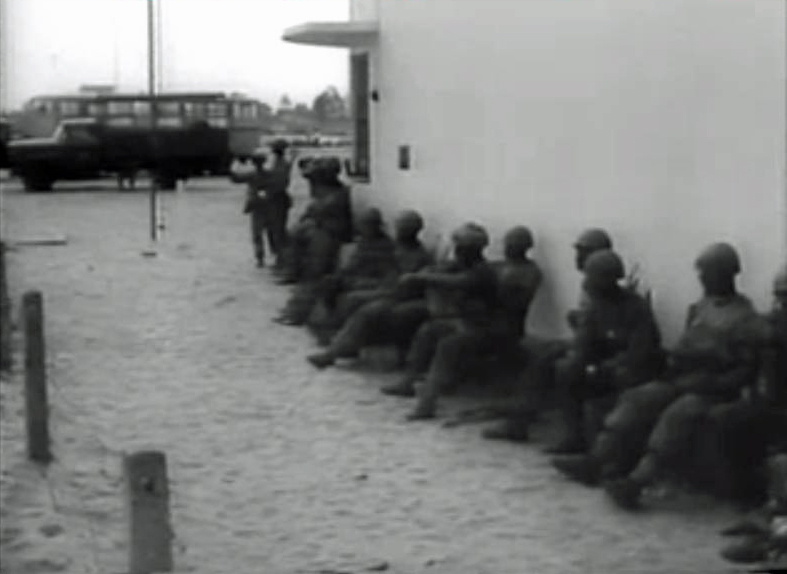
Congolese troops in early July 1960

The Force Publique was long characterised by repressive police actions and entrenched racial segregation. With the exception of 10 adjutants appointed shortly before independence, no Congolese soldier was able to advance past the rank of sergeant. Many hoped that independence would result in immediate promotions and material gains, but were disappointed by Lumumba's slow pace of reform. The rank-and-file felt that the Congolese political class—particularly ministers in the new government—were enriching themselves while failing to improve the troops' situation. There was dissatisfaction that Lumumba had appointed an unpopular colonel to a high post in the Ministry of Defence, and the troops from Équateur and southern Kasai were additionally upset that Bolikango and Kalonji were not included in the government. Many of the soldiers were also fatigued from maintaining order during the elections and participating in independence celebrations.

On the morning of 5 July General Émile Janssens, commander of the Force Publique, in response to increasing unrest among the Congolese ranks, summoned all troops on duty at Camp Léopold II. He demanded that the army maintain its discipline and wrote "before independence = after independence" on a black board to emphasise that the situation would not change. That evening the Congolese sacked the canteen in protest of Janssens. He alerted the reserve garrison of Camp Hardy, 95 miles away in Thysville. The officers tried to organise a convoy to send to Camp Léopold II to restore order, but the men mutinied and seized the armoury. The "Congo Crisis" which followed would come to dominate the tenure of the Lumumba Government. The following morning the troops in Thysville began arresting Europeans and confiscating firearms. Some soldiers drove to other towns in the Lower Congo, spreading the mutiny. Meanwhile, Janssens finalised plans to attack Camp Hardy and had alerted the commander of the Belgian metropolitan troops in the Congo. The government countermanded his order and instead dispatched Mobutu, Kisolokele, and the Vice President of Léopoldville Province to negotiate with the mutineers. They succeeded in releasing the captive Europeans and began evacuating them to the capital. Bands of angry soldiers roamed the capital, and Lumumba interrupted a cabinet meeting at his residence to invite one group to share its grievances. In an attempt to placate the mutinous troops, he dismissed Janssens and promoted every soldier by one grade. He also dismissed the Belgian officer in charge of the Sûreté and forced him into exile, precipitating a collapse of the organisation completed by the departure of most other Belgian personnel. In Léopoldville, several Congolese soldiers had been convinced that Lumumba had brought Soviet troops into the country to disarm the Force Publique. Angered by this, they stormed the hotel rooms of Soviet diplomats. Upon hearing what had occurred, Lumumba directed Bomboko to assume responsibility of the security of all foreign delegations present in the Congo and ensure that the Soviets could safely leave the country. Bomboko ordered Kanza to escort the delegation to N'djili Airport where they both convinced the Congolese soldiers to allow the Soviets to depart in peace.

On 7 July formal negotiations between the mutineers and the government on the reorganisation of army began. Though the situation in the capital was relatively calm, anxiety grew among the European community, which began to arm itself with weapons from illegal stockpiles. Belgian civilians began seeking passage to the French Congo or refuge in the Belgian embassy to await repatriation. Bomboko and Delvaux devoted much of their time to assisting them. The provincial presidents, who had been summoned to the capital, met with the Council of Ministers to discuss domestic security in the context of the mutiny. Other matters, including the appointment of administrative staff and the budget, were also considered. Tshombe specifically requested that Katanga be allocated a unique budget in consideration of its mineral wealth. Lumumba promised that he would consult his advisers on the proposal but stated that he was more concerned with ensuring order in the provinces. Belgian officials appealed to Lumumba to allow for Belgian troops to intervene to preserve law and order. In public, Lumumba stated that intervention was not necessary. In private, the government considered the possibility of intervention as a necessity and that it could be requested under the terms of the Treaty of Friendship. A ministerial committee was established to monitor the mutiny.

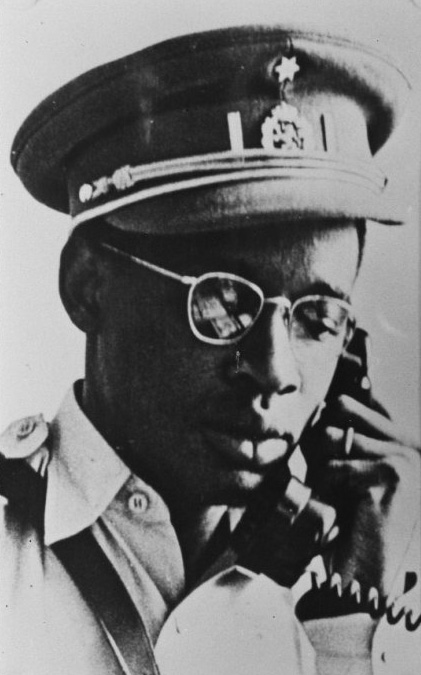
Joseph-Désiré Mobutu, appointed chief of staff of the Armée Nationale Congolaise

On 8 July the full Council of Ministers convened in an extraordinary session under the chairmanship of Kasa-Vubu at Camp Léopold II in Léopoldville to address the task of Africanising the garrison. By then the severity of the mutiny had convinced the ministers that radical reform was necessary in order to maintain the army's discipline. The Council first heard soldier delegations' grievances; the root cause of their dissatisfaction was that the army's leadership was wholly European despite independence from Belgium. The ministers then debated over who would make a suitable army chief of staff. The two main candidates for the post were Mpolo and Mobutu. The former had shown some influence over the mutinying troops, but Kasa-Vubu and the Bakongo ministers feared that he would enact a coup if he were given power. The latter was perceived as calmer and more thoughtful. In the end, Mobutu was given the role and awarded the rank of colonel. The ministers then decided that the Minister of Defence should appoint a Congolese sergeant major to replace Janssens as commander-in-chief of the army with the rank of general. Lumumba, at the suggestion of Mwamba, selected Victor Lundula for the role. (Note: Mwamba had believed that Mobutu was too young for the role of commander-in-chief, though other ministers felt otherwise. They accepted his proposal of Lundula when it was agreed that Mobutu would be chief of staff.) In addition to the appointments a state committee for the army—officially renamed the Armée Nationale Congolaise (Note: Sources do not agree on when the name change was applied. Gibbs says it occurred on Independence Day, while Gerard and Kuklick list it as a government reform in response to the mutiny.) (ANC)—was formed and put under the charge of a Congolese officer. It was further determined that the President would ex officio be the supreme commander of the military, the Prime Minister and Minister of Defence would control the army in a structure approved by Parliament, and all army units would be placed under the command of Congolese officers. Delegations were to be dispatched across the country to implement the latter reform. The ministers resolved to retain all Belgian officers "prepared to serve the Congo loyally" and guarantee the security of their income, families, and property so they could act as advisers to their successors. Marcel Lengema replaced Mobutu as Secretary of State to the Presidency.

"The head of state and all members of the government solemnly appeal to the whole population, to all soldiers and police, to reestablish order and return to work. The needful arrangements are being made to secure the safety and protection of people and property."

— Extract from the government communique of 8 July

The ministers decided it would be best to publicise their decisions as soon as possible. Immediately after the Council adjourned, the garrison of Camp Léopold II was summoned to the barrack square. Lumumba, acting in his capacity as Minister of Defence, announced the actions the government was taking to address the army's grievances. A communique was distributed by the secretariat of the Council of Ministers to the press and radio, summarising the government's decisions. The Congolese soldiers were satisfied with them, and tensions relaxed. Nevertheless, European civilians continued to try and flee the country.

On 9 July the government delegations left the capital to oversee the Africanisation of the ANC. Mobutu traveled to Équateur and while he was there Mpolo acted as ANC Chief of Staff. Kasa-Vubu and Lumumba went directly to Matadi where tensions were quickly worsening. From that point until later in the month the two worked closely with one another and made most major decisions together. After appointing a new garrison commander, supervising the election of other officers, and securing the release of captive Europeans, the pair left the city to inspect other units throughout the Lower Congo. European officers handed over control to the Congolese in Kivu and Orientale without incident, but the military situation in Kasai and Katanga remained tense and was marked by violence. The government's decision to Africanise the army caused anxiety in the civilian populace of the latter province, which feared such a reform would result in the collapse of domestic security. The provincial government refused to support Africanisation and appealed directly to Belgium to intervene to resolve the situation. The troops subsequently mutinied. Meanwhile, in Brussels news of conflict and abuses against Europeans brought public pressure against the Belgian government to take action. Ganshof and August de Schryver were sent to Léopoldville with an ultimatum for Lumumba: either a formal request for Belgian military assistance could be made or metropolitan troops would act on their own initiative to protect Belgian citizens. As Lumumba was not in the capital, Ganshof and de Schryver met with other ministers in an attempt to persuade them to agree to a military intervention. Discussions continued late into the evening and though some members of cabinet appeared receptive, Deputy Prime Minister Gizenga was obstinately opposed to such action and ultimately refused to consent. Overnight orders to intervene were delivered several times to the Belgian troops at Kamina base only to be repeatedly countermanded by the government. Lumumba and Kasa-Vubu were informed of the planned intervention and, though initially receptive to the idea, were disturbed that the Belgian government would not make guarantees regarding respect for Congolese sovereignty and subsequently asked that all Belgian troops be withdrawn from Congolese soil.

Regardless, the Belgians' decision to intervene ultimately prevailed and at 06:00 on 10 July metropolitan troops from Kamina flew into Élisabethville, the capital of Katanga Province, and occupied the local airport. (Note: Later that morning Bomboko met with fleeing Belgians at N'djili Airport. While there he declared that the Belgian intervention had been made at his request. This was most likely untrue and probably only said to ease tensions; no record of any such request has ever been found, and the Belgians never cited one when attempting to justify their intervention.) In the afternoon Lumumba and Kasa-Vubu returned to the capital having successfully quelled the unrest in the Lower Congo and convinced that negotiation could resolve the situation. Later they decided to solicit aid from the UN in restructuring the Force Publique. Ministers of the cabinet met with UN representative Ralph Bunche to discuss what technical assistance the UN could offer to the Congolese administration. Bunche shortly thereafter informed Hammarskjöld of the Congolese government's intended request. By evening Lumumba had learned of the Belgian intervention in Élisabethville. He was furious that the Belgians had acted contrary to the Treaty of Friendship and delivered a response over radio:

We have just learnt that the Belgian government has sent troops to the Congo and that they have intervened. The responsibility of Belgium is great. We protest bitterly against these measures which prejudice good relations between our countries. We appeal to all Congolese to defend our Republic against those who threaten it.

"I regret, in the name of the government of our Republic, the inadmissible actions that some soldiers have perpetrated against Europeans living in this Province. Our Minister of Justice, Mr. Mwamba, has today given formal instructions to the King's Prosecutor for legal inquests to be opened immediately regarding all guilty elements."

— Extract from Lumumba's letter to the Belgian consul-general, 11 July 1960

At the same time the Belgians launched a second intervention in Luluabourg. On 11 July Lumumba and Kasa-Vubu flew to the town. After overseeing the election of new officers for the garrison, Lumumba joined Kasa-Vubu in admonishing the Europeans to stay. Most refused to do so unless they had the protection of the Belgian troops. After lengthy negotiation Lumumba agreed to the condition and communicated to the Belgian consul-general that the force could remain in the province of Kasaï for two months. Back in Léopoldville, Ganshof and de Schryver continued to meet with the ministers with the hopes of establishing a mutual guarantee of security for both Europeans and Africans. Then, for reasons not entirely clear, Belgian units intervened in Matadi. (Note: The situation in Matadi was relatively calm at the time and all Europeans who had wished to leave had already done so. Some Belgian sources report that Belgian commanders were under the impression that European lives were at risk, while others state that the port was deemed strategically important in passing supplies to Léopoldville.) Fighting broke out and 12 Congolese were killed. News of the conflict (along with exaggerated casualty reports) spread to other army camps across the country, resulting in a wave of renewed mutinies and anti-Belgian hostility.

Between 10 and 18 July, Belgian forces intervened 28 times in Congolese localities. With the exception of the Luluabourg authorisation, the Belgian troops never acted with the permission of the government. The Force Publique mutinies increased the unpopularity of the army and cost the government a significant amount of support in rural areas. The insecurity they caused also impeded economic production and the distribution of goods and distracted the leadership from addressing other problems facing the administration. Order was ultimately restored largely through the use of the gendarmerie, a more wieldy and reliable institution than the army.

=== The Katangese secession ===
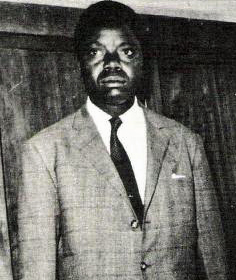
Moïse Tshombe, leader of CONAKAT and President of the declared State of Katanga

A number of CONAKAT leaders and Europeans made an attempt shortly before 30 June to declare Katanga an independent country. The Belgian government foiled their plans, as it favored its colony emerging as a unified state. The Force Publique mutiny and the refusal of Lumumba to accede to a military intervention caused the Belgians to alter their opinions; secession could provide them a way to reestablish order in the region and protect their large commercial interests in local industry. CONAKAT politicians also grew increasingly worried that Lumumba would dislodge their provincial government and replace them with BALUBAKAT members.

On the evening of 11 July Tshombe, accusing the central government of communist leanings and dictatorial rule, announced that Katanga was seceding from the Congo. When the ANC officer responsible for the Africanisation of the Élisabethville garrison arrived in the city, Katangese authorities immediately detained and expelled him. He flew to Luluabourg and informed Lumumba and Kasa-Vubu of the secession. The two decided to fly to Katanga for to examine the situation themselves. Katangese Minister of Interior Munongo denied them permission to land at the airport and radioed that while Kasa-Vubu could visit Katanga if he wished, Lumumba was not allowed to enter the territory. Infuriated, the President and Prime Minister returned to Luluabourg. They subsequently requested assistance from the UN Security Council in restructuring the ANC via telegram and informed the cabinet of their appeal.

Belgian troops immediately began to withdraw to Katanga following the declaration of independence, damaging infrastructure along the way. They disarmed ANC units that remained loyal to the central government, and several Belgian officers were appointed to a newly created Katangese Gendarmerie. The secession had the support of the UMHK, which assisted in the establishment of the new Katangese state—logistically and financially—and urged the Belgian government to support it. The company never sought to negotiate a compromise with Lumumba's government. The Belgian government subsequently established a technical assistance mission in Élisabethville and encouraged its citizens in the local administration to remain at their posts. While the secession was viewed favorably among conservatives in Western circles, leftist media saw the development as an attempt by Belgium to retain control over its economic interests and undermine the Lumumba Government. The government was frequently criticised in the Belgian press, while the Katangese situation was praised. Two of the largest newspapers in Léopoldville, Courrier d'Afrique and Présence Africaine, repeatedly attacked the administration for its failure to end the state of crisis.

"[Katanga] has decided its own destiny and refuses to submit to Lumumba's revolutionary policies. We highly recommend that the UN puts the Belgian troops stationed in Katanga in charge of maintaining order. If not, we fear that the Lumumba Government's harmful influence will spread to Élisabethville."

— Manu Ruys, 16 July 1960 edition of De Standaard

At 15:30 on 12 July the government convened in Léopoldville in the absence of the president and prime minister with Belgian Ambassador Jean van den Bosch, Ganshof, de Schryver, and eventually United States Ambassador Clare H. Timberlake. Bomboko directed most of the meeting, and proposed, in light of the strained relations between Belgium and the Congo, that a "foreign neutral army" be brought in to maintain order. After his initial suggestion of Israeli troops was agreed as too impractical, Bomboko advanced the idea of using United States forces. The ministers then penned a formal request of 3,000 troops for use in the capital and the Lower Congo which the United States government rejected, instead supporting the direction of aid through the UN. Later that day Gizenga addressed a moderate letter to Van den Bosch that implored the latter's government to be mindful of the Treaty of Friendship. That evening Kashamura went on the radio to declare that the government was "indignant" towards the Belgians' actions in Matadi.

On the morning of 13 July Bomboko retrieved Belgian officers and their families from Thysville and brought them to the capital. Meanwhile, other ministers went to the Palais de la Nation, where the Chamber was in session. Kashamura pronounced that "Belgium overwhelmingly voted for the declaration of war against the Congo." Delvaux and the President of Léopoldville Province met with the Belgian commander-in-chief of the intervention at N'djili Airport, where the Congolese, after a long debate, agreed to try to set up joint patrols in the capital, "to organise camaraderie between white and black soldiers", and for a "member of the government to be delegated to [the Belgian metropolitan army command] to act in agreement with it". But in the late afternoon the Congolese government, under the leadership of Gizenga, decided, following the refusal of the United States government, to seek military aid from Ghana, pending the arrival of an international peacekeeping force. Gizenga arranged for all attending ministers to sign the letter so that none could disassociate from it. He announced the decision over radio. During the evening the government sent a letter to Van den Bosch demanding the withdrawal of all Belgian troops from Léopoldville by 05:00 the next day under the threat of severing diplomatic relations.

Lumumba and Kasa-Vubu then sent another telegram to the UN, stating that peacekeepers were requested to guard the Congo's sovereignty against Belgian aggression and warning that if the request was not speedily fulfilled they would turn to the Bandung Powers for assistance. The following day they sent a message to Soviet Premier Nikita Khrushchev from Kindu, asking that he monitor the situation in the Congo closely. In New York City the UN Security Council adopted UNSC Resolution 143, calling upon Belgium to withdraw its troops and authorising the Secretary-General to send military and technical assistance to the Congo in consultation with the government to restore law and order. This resulted in the establishment of a large UN multinational peacekeeping force (generally known by its French acronym of ONUC). Foreign contingents arrived in the capital shortly thereafter. Hammarskjöld later stated that these were to form a "temporary security force" that, although acting with the consent of and performing some of the tasks of the government, was completely under UN command.

Later that day Lumumba and Kasa-Vubu, in part to satisfy pressing demands from Parliament, and also upset by the continuation of military interventions, announced that they were severing diplomatic relations with Belgium:

Following first Belgium's flagrant violation of the Treaty of Friendship of 29 June with the Republic of the Congo as to the clause stating that Belgian troops could not be used on Congolese territory without express request by the Government of the Congo and second because of the attack on our territorial integrity which Belgium has committed in provoking the secession of Katanga which attack was proved first by the Belgian troops' refusal to permit the Chief of State to land in Élisabethville Tuesday 12 July and second by the nomination of a Belgian officer to command the army in Katanga, our Government has decided in consequence of the act of aggression against the Republic of the Congo to break off all diplomatic relations with Belgium from this day 14 July 1960.

Lumumba and Kasa-Vubu then instructed their Belgian pilot to fly them from Kindu to Stanleyville. Acting under orders from Brussels, he took them to Léopoldville, where they were both greeted by a large Belgian contingent at N'djili Airport. Later they made another attempt to fly to Stanleyville, but their pilot turned back after saying the aircraft suffered a "fault". They were harassed by Belgian paratroopers and refugees on their return and were under the impression that Congolese sovereignty was being disrespected. Most Congolese were deeply upset by their treatment and felt that the Belgian intervention—even if initially justified—had gone too far. The leadership began turning its attention away from resolving the ANC's systemic problems and more towards checking Belgian military action. A handful of observers were concerned that Lumumba was acting without proper consultation with his ministers or Parliament.

On 16 July Lumumba and Kasa-Vubu succeeded in flying to Stanleyville. Lumumba appealed for calm among the garrison, but after hearing of more interventions, he and Kasa-Vubu demanded that all Belgian metropolitan forces withdraw from the Congo in 24 hours or they would request military aid from the Soviet Union. This was done to put pressure on UN officials to ensure the Belgian departure and leave open the option of assistance from another party. UN officials reacted to the ultimatum by calling a meeting to N'djili Airport with the Belgian commander-in-chief and Bomboko and Kanza. All present agreed that the demand was unfortunate and that it would not be possible for the Belgians to withdraw so quickly. Bomboko and Kanza, both surprised by the ultimatum, promised to try and secure a retraction of the measure at the next cabinet meeting. Bunche managed to secure assurance from the Belgian command that all metropolitan troops would leave Léopoldville by 23 August. The last of the Belgian troops did not leave the Congo until 7 August, except in Katanga, where the soldiers did not evacuate until 4 September.

On 17 July Yav, a member of Tshombe's CONAKAT, announced his resignation from the Lumumba Government and departed for Katanga. Nyembo followed suit. Meanwhile, ONUC contingents began disarming mutinous soldiers with considerable success, much due to the cooperation of Mpolo. On 19 July Lumumba had ONUC suspend this practice, on the grounds that such confiscations were humiliating and that if the peacekeepers were not going to resolve the Katangese secession he would need the ANC to be prepared to do so.

=== Interactions with Parliament ===
Parliament was convened in an extraordinary session from late June until late July and its discussions during the time were dominated by the mutiny of the Force Publique and the Katangese secession. On the whole the Chamber of Deputies approved of the government's activities while the Senate did not. Throughout July and August the Senate offered frequent criticism of the actions of the members of the government. On 5 July it refused to offer its consent to Lumumba's suggested state commissioners, citing his failure to consult provincial officials on the nominations (it later confirmed Sendwe as State Commissioner for Katanga). The government found the Senate's insistence on monitoring its activities to be overbearing. On 14 July Lumumba spoke to the Chamber, detailing his treatment by Belgians and Katangese, and explaining that his long absence from the capital was necessitated by his tour to calm the disorders in the interior. He asked that Parliament unite with his government to manage the situation, and most deputies subsequently expressed their support. The following day Kanza, Bomboko, and Delvaux appeared before Parliament to reject accusations of personal "complicity" in regards to the Belgian intervention and to affirm their concurrence with the actions taken by Lumumba and Kasa-Vubu to restore order. On 18 July the Senate expressed its disapproval of Lumumba and Kasa-Vubu's threat to seek support from the Soviet Union while the Chamber refused a proposition to grant the government emergency powers. Meanwhile, the nature of the material being issued by Kashamura's Ministry of Information was subjected to an increasing amount of criticism, being labeled "controlled and distorted" by Catholic circles. On the initiative of Iléo, the Senate resolved on 19 July to review the content of government press releases and investigate the possibility of a motion of censure against Kashamura.

Parliament also sought to review the government's programme. After the issue was initially raised by several senators on 7 July, the Chamber and the House both concurred that the programme had to be tabled by 19 July. The failure for this demand to be met led to two days of intense debate in which several members of Parliament threatened to withdraw their confidence in the government. Multiple senators filed an interpellation on 7 August directed at Lumumba, requesting an answer for the lack of a programme. Eventually one was released by Kashamura in his capacity as Minister of Information. It read in part as follows:

- The local authority of chiefs and notables to be sustained, however, in the interests of stability.
- The Government welcomes democratic opposition once reconstruction has got under way.
- The Government guarantees individual liberties; separates Church and State. Government is preparing legislation to end arbitrary arrest. Free Marriage.
- The Republic will be a State of law, thus relative separation of powers.
  - Legislative: Chamber of Deputies.
    Senate.
    Executive, represented the Head of State.
    Each has equal initiative.
    - Members of the Government share in the legislature in two ways:
      (a) Under authority of Head of State they present legislative projects to the Chambers.
      (b) As deputies or senators they vote.
  - Judicial: Immediate Africanisation of magistracy as fast as studies permit.
  - Executive: Has to take necessary measures for implementing the laws. [Head of State] is first and foremost the servant of the legislator.

Governmental Declaration

- He deals with general rules and particular appointments.
  Foreign Affairs: The Congo will follow a policy of:
  Trades: Aims as follows:
  - (i) To maintain existing markets; to expand these markets.
  - (ii) Open door policy re Imports, as far as is consonant with protection of indigenous industry.
  - (iii) Import/Export reciprocity programme.
  - (iv) The Government declares that private property is the prerogative of individual freedom. It refuses to acknowledged nationalisation, as a general rule.
- The Government is especially anxious for rural development—communal and collective organisations to be tried. Roads and services to be improved. Town lodgings to be regulated. Co-ops to be government fertilised; other technical and financial assistance to individual traders, etc.
- The Government is anxious to develop a prosperous middle class.
- Central Bank and National Institute of Development to be set up.
- Mines: At present account for 35–40% of Treasury Revenues. 14 milliard francs invested in 1959. 80,000 workers in 1959.
  - The Government aims to develop zinc, cobalt, manganese, gold, etc. based on private initiative; opportunities in Kivu and Bakongo area, where alumina and power are found at Boma.
- Land Policy: Holdings to be limited in future. Compensation and tenurial stabilisation being prepared.

Plan of Economic Co-ordination

- Finance: Five milliards overseas investment needed. Tax won't supply enough; also moves for loans from International Agencies and Belgium are in train. Congo has every intention of staying within Belgian currency zones.
- Communications drive.

Other matters: Salary policy without discrimination of race...or sex

- Qualifications standards in construction of rational wages system. A general effort for total wage rise by 30%. Drive to reduce unemployment. Work tribunals and Inspection bodies. Promotion of Co-operatives, Housing Families, Social Security legislation, Youth and Sports.
- Education programme: Illiteracy drive (adult and child). Primary Instruction for all. Subsidies for Secondary, Normal, and Technical education with equal treatment of girls. Building up educational cadres.

=== Collapse of administration ===
"From July 1 to September 29, 1960, the country was no longer really governed. No law, no ordinance, no important decision was made. It suffices to leaf through the Moniteur Congolais [the government gazette] for this period to appreciate this. One finds that two executive orders had been promulgated, one on September 5 restricting civil liberties, the other on August 16, 1960, installing a special military regime. To be complete, one should add three orders of the Finance Ministry on questions of administrative routine...Within the administration, the functionaries, lacking top-echelon personnel and government directives, found it impossible to make the administrative machine function. The public services were paralyzed by absenteeism and riddled with the gangrene of political favoritism...Finally, no measure was taken by the government to assure the continuity of fiscal receipts and supplies. No disposition was taken to halt the financial hemorrhage caused by the massive transfer of capital and reserves abroad."

— Albert Ndele, chef de cabinet in the Lumumba Government Ministry of Finance

The disorder that engulfed the Congo prevented almost all of the government ministries from functioning. Most of this was due to the flight of European functionaries, which had begun leaving en masse after de Schryver confirmed that all Belgian civil servants would be guaranteed employment in the metropole. (Note: Van den Bosch announced on 8 July that, due to the deterioration of domestic security, all civil servants in Léopoldville could assume posts in Belgium. On 12 July the Belgian government extended the offer to all functionaries in the Congo, except those working in Kivu and Katanga.) By the end of July 5,589 Belgian civil servants had fled the Congo, soon to be joined by an additional 1,129 in August. Almost all of those working for the central government in Léopoldville left. All of the Europeans in the Bureau Central des Traitements (the office in charge of government salaries) had departed, leaving the office in the hands of a Congolese chief clerk. All but one of 175 postal workers vacated their posts, alongside all 542 agricultural experts (some later returned) and most of the 328 Belgians running telecommunications systems. Health services were not as adversely affected, since many of the rural divisions were already managed by Congolese while a substantial number of private practitioners that remained in the country handled work in urban areas. The effects on education were not immediately felt because schools were out of session and most of the teachers were in Europe, though it was unlikely that many would return for September classes. Though the government no longer had to pay the large salaries of many Europeans, the cost benefits were largely offset by the pay increases for soldiers and regular Congolese civil servants (a 30% wage hike for all Congolese functionaries was declared in July). Other administrative areas deteriorated during the time, including sanitation, the postal service, railways, air traffic control, and radio communications. The mutinies deprived the government of an effective means of law enforcement. Provincial institutions were left to operate independently by the collapse. From 20 July onward, the Belgian government attempted to stem the flight of functionaries and convinced some to return to their posts. Ambassador Van den Bosch wanted to avoid a total administrative collapse and worked to ensure the retention of Belgian personnel. In doing so he established contacts with ONUC, Congolese ministers in favor of a strong relationship with Belgium, and certain ministries (namely Finance, Economic Affairs, and External Commerce). He also communicated with the remaining Belgian civil servants who were anxious about serving in an administration that had the disapproval of the Belgian government, advising those in the employment of moderate ministers or the Presidency to continue their work while cautioning those attached to the "extremists" (e.g. Lumumba and Kashamura) to avoid any undertakings that would harm Belgian interests. (Note: Some Belgian personnel asked that they be reclassified as UN technicians or Belgian state employees on loan to the Congolese government.) Throughout July several ministries, including Agriculture, Justice, and Labor, warned Belgian absentees that if they did not resume their duties their employment would be terminated. In the Ministry of Finance there was entrenched opposition to the return of employees that had fled to Belgium.

Most of the Congolese civil servants filled the leadership gap by electing their peers to senior posts, some of whom had received the abbreviated training in Belgium. A handful of positions were given out based solely on political considerations by politicians or political parties. With some exceptions, the majority of the appointees faced substantial confusion in their new roles. The situation was complicated by the fact that many Belgian functionaries had withdrawn with keys to filing cabinets and destroyed their documents. The handover in the Ministry of Economic Coordination and Planning under Kabangi's leadership was relatively smooth, and the department busied itself with organising the distribution of foreign food aid to the interior of the Congo. At the end of July the ministry dispatched delegations to the provincial capitals in consultation with the UN to appraise the provinces' economic needs. Almost all Belgian employees of the Ministry of Finance vacated their posts, (Note: By the end of August all of the approximately 150 Belgian personnel in the ministry had fled. Only 8 resumed their work by the end of the year.) but the transition to Congolese management occurred quickly and with minimal disruption. This was because most of the department's Congolese staff were already experienced accountants, held an apolitical attitude towards their work, and were committed to learning how to operate in their new roles. Their activities were made easier by the fact that Belgian employees of the Central Bank had remained working in the capital. Still, an internal survey concluded that even after reform additional technicians were needed by the ministry, and recruitment of foreign experts was sought. ONUC personnel also took up many posts in the administration working on a mostly collaborative basis with the Congolese, though they did assume managerial responsibility of health, communication, and some transportation services. ONUC also instituted several successful job training programs for government functionaries. Nevertheless, observers concurred throughout July and August that on the whole the government operated in a state of disorder. Without a functioning administration, the agriculture and construction sectors which depended upon their services suffered, as did public works and parastatals. (Note: The administration was unable to provide agricultural and parastatal corporations with the subsidies and short-term credit necessary for the steady maintenance of their operations.) Critical infrastructure support components such as steamboats, locomotives, agricultural machinery, communications hardware, and dredging equipment, despite sustaining only minimal damage during the army mutinies, were not maintained during the summer and ultimately deteriorated beyond repair.

Public expenditure regulations, tax collection (especially of income tax), and foreign exchange controls faltered, driving down receipts. There was no effective monitoring of the amount and use of the funds taken by the provincial administrations. Numerous wage increases drove up regular expenses by about £3 million. Payments on the public debt dropped dramatically. The government began running monthly deficits of FC 700 million ($14 million). To handle the costs, the Central Bank began supplying the government with advances of an average of over FC 500 million per month (the statutory limit on advances was twice raised by presidential decree), covering 90% of the deficit.

=== Lumumba's trip abroad ===
Kanza and Mandi left on 19 July for the UN Headquarters in New York City, arriving the following day. That evening the Security Council discussed the Congolese situation and Kanza debated Wigny over the true nature of the Belgian intervention. A new resolution was unanimously adopted, reaffirming the demand for Belgium's withdrawal and granting the Secretary-General the power to take "all necessary action" to ensure this was fulfilled. Lumumba intended to go to New York and express the position of his government himself. He was encouraged to do this by some of the other ministers, who felt that Kanza would not offer a strong enough rebuke of Belgian actions.

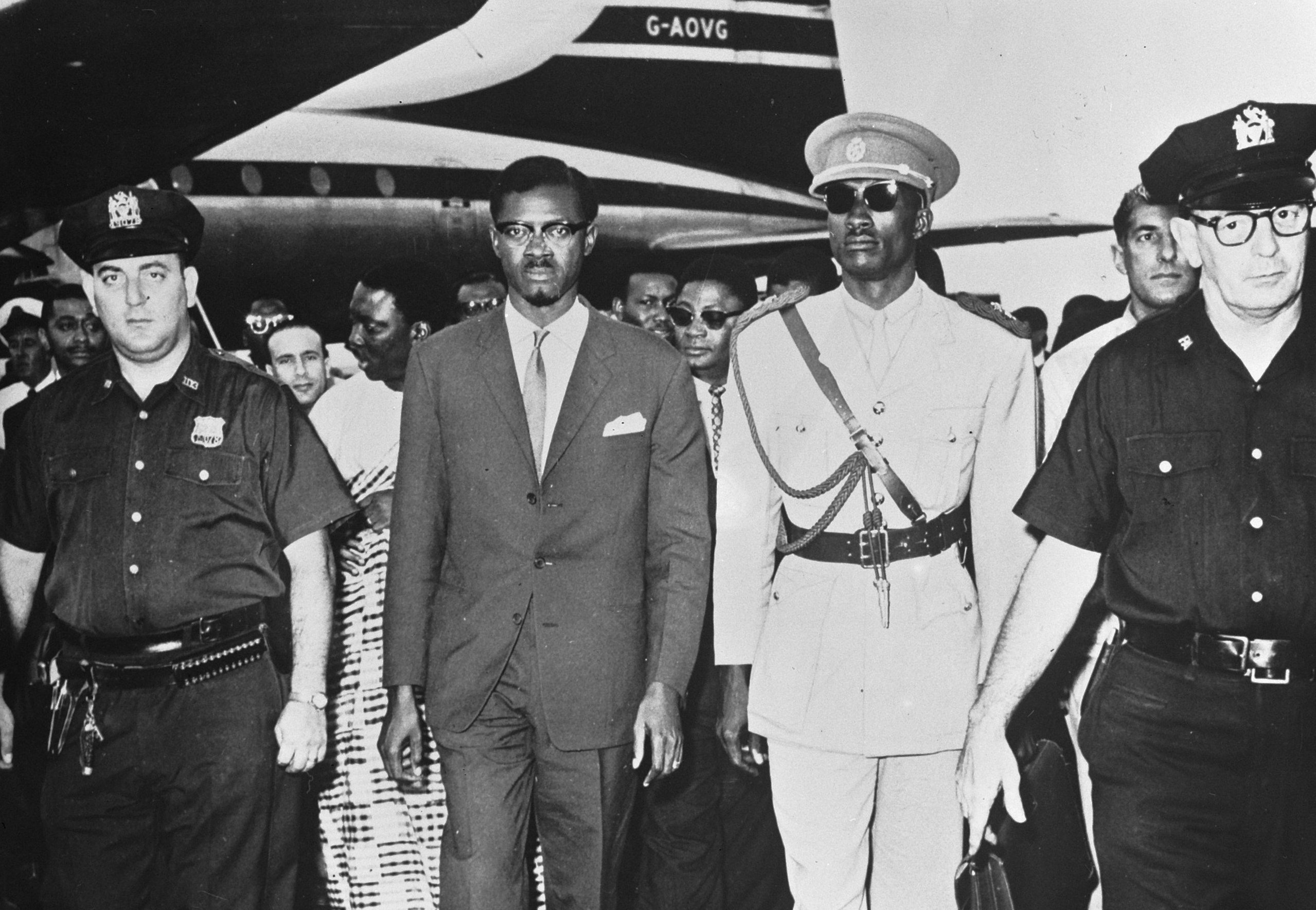
Lumumba arriving in New York on 24 July 1960

Shortly before his departure, Lumumba announced that he had signed an economic agreement with an American businessman who had created the Congo International Management Corporation (CIMCO). According to the contract (which had yet to be ratified by Parliament), CIMCO was to form a development corporation to invest in and manage certain sectors of the economy. (Note: Kanza later said, "[Lumumba] didn’t care...as long as an American presented this contract. People like us tried to tell him not to sign. He signed and in his mind it was something very good for the Congo.") He also declared his approval of the second Security Council resolution, adding that "[Soviet] aid was no longer necessary" and announced his intention to seek technical assistance from the United States. On 22 July Lumumba left the Congo for New York City. (Note: When Lumumba left the Congo Parliament went into recess. Upon his return he recommended that the body remain in recess for three months so that its members could go on study tours. Parliament did not reconvene until September.) Accompanying was a delegation including Mbuyi and Kiwewa. The group reached the United States two days later and rendezvoused with Kanza and Mandi at the Barclay Hotel to prepare for meetings with UN officials. Lumumba was focused on discussing the withdrawal of Belgian troops and various options for technical assistance with Hammarskjöld. African diplomats were keen that the meetings would be successful and also convinced Lumumba to wait until the Congo was more stable before reaching any more major economic agreements (like the CIMCO arrangement). The Prime Minister saw Hammarskjöld and other staff of the UN Secretariat on 24, 25, and 26 July. Kanza, Mandi, and other advisers were present for all three meetings. Though Lumumba and Hammarskjöld were hesitant towards one another, their discussions went smoothly. In a press conference Lumumba reaffirmed his government's commitment to "positive neutralism".

Following the 26 July meeting, Hammarskjöld departed for Brussels. After conferring with the Belgian government he flew to Léopoldville where on 28 July he met with the Council of Ministers. Hammarskjöld was surprised by the ministers' anger and impatience in relation to Katanga and ONUC's slow pace of operations. He disapproved of the Lumumba Government's positions, especially its handling of the Congo's dire financial situation. He thought of it as "a clumsy, inadequate government that does not do the proper thing" and hoped that it would accept the guiding tutelage of the UN until the Congo Crisis could be resolved. In a telegram to UN Headquarters, the secretary-general described his overall impression of the government:

After a number of meetings here with the Cabinet and members of the Cabinet, I have a fairly clear picture of the internal dynamics of politics in the Central Government. The two or three men who may be characterized as moderates and who at all events are men of real integrity, intelligence and sense of national responsibility understand, I believe, fully my approach....However, the vast and vocal majority have a highly emotional and intransigent attitude....Until the Katanga problem is in hand..., there will, I am sure, be a continued drift towards extremism in the Cabinet and a continued weakening of those on whom, in my view, [the] Congo's political future if at all has to be built.

It was decided that a committee should be established among the cabinet to coordinate with UN officials, consisting of Gizenga (in the place of Lumumba), Bomboko, Kanza, Gbenye, Mwamba, and Mpolo. The following day Gizenga expressed his dissatisfaction with ONUC's leniency towards the Belgian troops and hesitance to enter Katanga. Lumumba showed his concurrence back in New York. Such pressure, combined with the threat of Soviet intervention, convinced Hammarskjöld to take action; he announced that Bunche would lead an advance guard into Élisabethville followed shortly thereafter by UN peacekeeping contingents. Gizenga's demand that government ministers be allowed to accompany Bunche was rejected. Due to several Katangese political maneuvers, Bunche was dispatched to Katanga early on 4 August. He communicated Katangese threats of armed opposition to Hammarskjöld, who decided to postpone the entry of ONUC troops.

Lumumba went to Washington D.C., the United States capital, on 27 July. He met with the American Secretary of State and appealed for financial and technical assistance. The American government informed the Prime Minister that they would only offer aid through the UN. The following day he received a telegram from Gizenga detailing a clash at Kolwezi between Belgian and Congolese forces. Lumumba thus felt that the UN was hampering his attempts to expel the Belgian troops and defeat Katanga. On 29 July he went to Ottawa, the capital of Canada. The Canadians rebuffed a request for technicians and stated that they would channel their assistance through the UN. Frustrated, Lumumba met with the Soviet ambassador and discussed the gifting of military equipment. When he returned to New York the following evening he was incredibly hesitant towards the UN. The attitude of the United States government was also more negative, due to reports of the rapes and violence committed by ANC soldiers and scrutiny from Belgium, which was chagrined by the reception Lumumba had received in Washington. The Belgian government regarded Lumumba as communist, anti-white, and anti-Western, and given their experience in the Congo, many other Western governments gave credence to the Belgian perception. United States President Dwight D. Eisenhower shared such views.

Frustrated with the UN's apparent inaction towards Katanga as he departed America, Lumumba decided to delay his return to the Congo and instead visited several African states. This was apparently done to put pressure on Hammarskjöld and, that failing, seek guarantees of bilateral military support to suppress Katanga. Between 2 and 8 August he toured Tunisia, Morocco, Guinea, Ghana, Liberia, and Togo. Guinea and Ghana pledged independent military support, while the others expressed their desire to work through the United Nations to resolve the Katangese secession. It was also agreed that a summit of African states would be held in Léopoldville between 25 and 30 August to further discuss the issue. Lumumba returned to the Congo, apparently confident that he could now depend upon African military assistance. He also believed that he could procure African bilateral technical aid, which placed him at odds with Hammarskjöld's goal of funneling support through ONUC. Lumumba and some of the ministers were wary of the UN option, as it supplied them with functionaries that would not respond directly to their authority.

=== Stiffening opposition and dissension ===
By the end of July opposition to the Lumumba Government had solidified in Parliament. Lumumba's absence from the country allowed these elements to organise and advertise their position. Van den Bosch had taken advantage of the time to establish contacts with the moderate ministers: Bomboko, Delvaux, Kabangi, Kanza, and Mbuyi. Bomboko became the ambassador's most frequent contact and was relayed messages from Wigny. (Note: The Belgian government hoped to obtain sympathy among the moderate ministers for the Katangese situation so as to reach a favorable compromise. Most of the moderates rejected such advances and Bomboko told Wigny that the Congolese government was opposed to the secessionist activities that Belgium supported.) Van den Bosch also developed a relationship with Iléo, who pledged that he would work in tandem with other senators to remove Lumumba from power. On 3 August Bolikango officially denounced Lumumba's policies, followed the next day by the central committee of the MNC-K. The Prime Minister's impatient and improvising approach caused consternation among the civil service, which wished to operate in a calmer, more methodical style. On 27 July, Nkayi expressed as much when he held a press conference to share his concerns about the national decline in social and economic activity. Alluding to Lumumba, he denounced "demagogic statements that harm the interests of the Congolese people". Through his chef de cabinet, he declared that Lumumba's CIMCO deal was invalid because the cabinet had not been consulted before it was signed. Joseph Malula, the Catholic bishop of Léopoldville, denounced the Lumumba Government's support of separation of church and state, and specifically the secularisation of the latter.

In order to distract from their activities, opposition groups began peddling a rumor of a Gizenga coup. Suspicious, Lumumba asked Gizenga to lead Bomboko, Kanza, Mwamba, and Mpolo to New York on 8 August to address the UN Security Council. Lumumba's supporters convinced Gizenga to let Bomboko speak for the delegation at the UN. The speech he delivered had been drafted by the other four ministers and was critical of Belgium's actions. This put up a front of cabinet solidarity and briefly discouraged thought of Bomboko's more pro-Belgian attitudes.

Lumumba also faced dissent in the central Congo. Following independence, Baluba throughout Katanga and Kasai became the subject of violent attacks. Kalonji and his allies made an official call to the Baluba across the Congo to return to their "homeland" in the southern portion of the province on 14 July. Initially, they envisaged the division of Kasai in two in order to allow for the creation of a quasi-autonomous MNC-K and Luba-dominated provincial government. Rapidly, however, Kalonji realised that the chaos in the rest of the Congo could be used to secede unilaterally and declare full local independence. On 9 August he announced the secession of the "Mining State of South Kasai". This complicated any future military action against Katanga, as the rail line from the military base in Luluabourg to the province ran through Kalonji's territory.

"Ministers and even [Lumumba]'s chiefs of staff were rarely there, which the Prime Minister constantly complained about. They were in the bars, the hotels, the restaurants, where the policy was."

— Serge Michel, Lumumba's press secretary (translated from French)

Throughout August Lumumba increasingly withdrew from his full cabinet and instead consulted officials and ministers he trusted, such as Mpolo, Mbuyi, Kashamura, Gizenga, and Kiwewa. Kasa-Vubu's wishes frequently went unheeded by the government. Lumumba kept Kashamura on in spite of his displayed incompetence and disorganisation, instead addressing the problems by assigning most of Kashamura's responsibilities to his own press secretary, Serge Michel. Meanwhile, the Prime Minister's office was in disarray and few members of his staff did any work. His chef de cabinet, Damien Kandolo, was often absent and acted as a spy on behalf of the Belgian government. (Note: According to U.S. intelligence officer Larry Devlin, Lumumba's government and staff "included known KGB agents and others believed to be under Soviet influence".) Lumumba was constantly being delivered rumors from informants and the Sûreté, encouraging him to grow deeply suspicious of others. Kanza attempted in vain to exercise a moderating influence on the Prime Minister. Gizenga privately expressed his disapproval of Lumumba's methods. All the while Mulele was attempting to organise a student exchange program with Eastern European countries and nationalise Lovanium University. He succeeded in proposing the latter action in a meeting of the Council of Ministers on 16 August, but backlash from Christian groups dissuaded Lumumba and Kasa-Vubu from carrying it out. The Council of Ministers met with decreasing frequency throughout August; by September, it was hardly convening at all.

Map of the Congo in 1961 with South Kasai highlighted in red, bordered by secessionist Katanga to the south

Meanwhile, large amounts of capital were withdrawn from the country while exports fell dramatically. Without Katangese participation in the economy, hard currency earnings were halved. On 6 August the government responded to the deteriorating situation by adopting a decree that forbade international payments. The order was never published or otherwise communicated to those it would have concerned and the Central Bank still permitted a number of transactions. Between 1 July and 15 August the bank's foreign currency reserves fell from about $75 million to $35 million. The Lumumba Government threatened to expropriate the abandoned European enterprises if their owners did not return to the Congo and reopen them, but never followed through with any action. It also sought financial support from the International Monetary Fund and dispatched Nkayi and Delvaux to Geneva for negotiations with Belgian authorities. Lumumba and the Council of Ministers were completely bypassed in the implementation of the decisions agreed upon during the discussions; in early September Nkayi, with the sole sanction of Kasa-Vubu, established a monetary council and began issuing new paper currency. Though it was resolved that the Central Bank would be liquidated, the measure was never carried out.

By September the government's financial situation was ruinous; a combination of disrupted tax collection, the inaccessibility of Katanga's mining industry, the closure of European enterprises, falling production, and declining volume of foreign trade had brought about a severe reduction in revenue. Neither soldiers, civil servants, nor public contractors could be properly compensated. Affected individuals' faith in the government suffered, as did the overall morale and discipline of the ANC. There were no funds available for the necessary imports required to keep certain segments of the population fed. Lacking in foodstuffs, these groups withdrew their support for the administration. Lumumba believed that Albert Ndele, Nkayi's chef de cabinet and the acting Secretary-General of the Ministry of Finance, had directed the Geneva negotiations and would implement Belgium's financial goals at the expense of the Congo's. Lumumba had Ndele dismissed only for the Council of Ministers to reinstate him on 1 September.

The dire administrative and economic situation caused consternation among the trade unions; the government was threatened with a possible civil servants' strike at the hands of APIC, which was protesting politically partisan appointments. Dissension and subversion campaigns, including the dissemination of anti-Lumumba leaflets and inciting of army mutinies, were organised in Brazzaville with the support of President Fulbert Youlou, Belgian intelligence services, the French Service de Documentation Extérieure et de Contre-Espionnage, and the United States Central Intelligence Agency (CIA). Batshikama, though a secretary of state in the Lumumba Government, spent two hours every evening in Brazzaville hosting an anti-Lumumba radio programme. Wigny directed the Belgian agents there to encourage the Congolese opposition to remove Lumumba through presidential revocation, as a parliamentary motion of censure was deemed too likely to fail. In a meeting with his advisers on 18 August President Eisenhower suggested that he wanted Lumumba to be killed; the CIA subsequently organised an assassination operation. Belgium made similar plans. By the end of the month rumors were circulating in the capital of Western overtures to Kasa-Vubu to replace Lumumba's government.

=== Attempts at reconsolidation ===
"The government has declared a state of emergency throughout the whole country...Those who confuse subversive maneuvers with freedom, obstruction with democratic opposition, or their personal interest with that of the nation will soon be judged by the people. Those who are paid today by the enemies of freedom for the purpose of maintaining sedition movements across the country and thereby disturbing the social peace will be punished with the utmost energy..."

— Lumumba's statement to the press, 10 August 1960 (translated from French)

During a meeting on 1 August the Council of Ministers established a new department, the Ministry of Public Function. Ngenge was given charge of the portfolio, while an experienced clerk was made its secretary-general. Within 15 days of its inception the ministry had produced a plan for staggered Africanisation of the administration (taking living wages, staff competence, and fiscal austerity into consideration) and drafted a standard contract of employment for much-needed foreign technicians. At the end of the month the ministry, with the support of the UN, hosted a meeting of the various government secretaries-general to discuss ways of stemming the politicisation of the civil service.

Lumumba returned to the Congo on 8 August and soon thereafter met with the Council of Ministers. The following day he proclaimed an état d'exception throughout the Congo, (Note: According to Govender, "Lumumba had always been reluctant to declare a state of emergency, but with the intensification of hostile acts against his regime by Congolese plotters and their Western friends, he felt that a state of emergency would help his poorly equipped security forces and administration to act more effectively against the trouble-makers.") and his government carried out its expulsion order against Ambassador Van den Bosch. Mandi insisted that his ousting did not signify a permanent rupture between Belgium and the Congo. Lumumba announced that all other Belgian diplomatic staff would face arrest if they did not leave the country. He subsequently issued several orders in an attempt to reassert his dominance on the political scene. The first outlawed the formation of associations without government sanction. A second asserted the government's right to ban publications that produced material likely to bring the administration into disrepute. On 11 August the Courrier d'Afrique printed an editorial which declared that the Congolese did not want to fall "under a second kind of slavery". The editor was summarily arrested and four days later publication of the daily ceased, followed shortly thereafter by the delivery of shut-down orders against the Belga and Agence France-Presse wire services. Lumumba also decreed the nationalisation of Belga, creating the Agence Congolaise de Presse, creating a medium through which the government's platform could be more easily communicated to the public. Bolamba was given responsibility for the agency. Another order stipulated that official approval had to be obtained six days in advance of public gatherings. On 16 August Lumumba announced the installation of a régime militaire espécial for the duration of six months, including the establishment of military tribunals. (Note: The government was able to successfully institute the tribunals in only a few locations. The relevant ordinance for the régime militaire was withdrawn on 4 November.) He also initiated the arrest of public figures who opposed him. (Note: On 1 September Bolikango was detained in Gemena on Lumumba's orders, ostensibly for committing secessionist activities and planning assassinations of both Lumumba and Kasa-Vubu, and brought to the capital. This led to demonstrations by his supporters throughout the city on the following day.)

Meanwhile, Kasa-Vubu faced criticism from ABAKO and President Youlou for not curbing Lumumba's authoritarian actions. He resisted their pressure, and on 13 August he broadcast an appeal for unity and support for the government. Nevertheless, he cautioned the government against arbitrariness and excess:

If I am under a moral obligation to support and defend the government within the limits set by the law, the members of the government themselves have a duty to work together as a team. Their policy must be the policy of the government and not that of one party, one race, or one tribe. It must be a policy which reflects the interests of the nation and which allows humanitarian values to flourish in freedom. This imperative excludes all feelings of hatred, suspicion, and bad faith towards those who have collaborated loyally with us. It is also the duty of the government to respect the institutions which have been set up and to abide by the normal rules of democratic practice.

In New York, the UN Security Council discussed the issue of sending ONUC troops into Katanga. Bomboko debated with Belgian delegates over the nature of the military intervention in Katanga. On 9 August the body passed a resolution that called upon Belgium to withdraw its troops from Katanga with all necessary haste and affirmed that peacekeepers should enter the province, but not act as a party to any belligerent. Tshombe acceded to the resolution, and ONUC established itself in Katanga, but did not interfere with Tshombe's government. Belgian troops grew inactive and were gradually withdrawn. Lumumba remained frustrated and five days later he sent a letter to Hammarskjöld, declaring that the Secretary-General had ignored his obligations under the 14 July resolution to consult the Congolese government before taking action and had failed to assist it in restoring law and order throughout the entire country.

With the UN refusing to take action against the secessions, Lumumba decided that his government would have to reintegrate the territories on its own. The central government's assault to retake South Kasai began on 23 August. Lumbala advised the army during the operation and organised the arrests of the rebel leadership. All Sabena aircraft in the Congo were requisitioned by the government for the offensive, while technical and materiel assistance was requested from the Soviet Union. The Soviets supplied 14 Ilyushin transports and 100 trucks. Soldiers were flown into the Kasai region with little supplies. ANC units secured Bakwanga, the South Kasaian capital, on the night of 27–28 August with little resistance, temporarily ending the secession. Kalonji fled to Élisabethville where he vowed to continue his rebellion. Soldiers began seizing food and vehicles in preparation for the assault on Katanga. Conflict erupted between the army and resident Baluba and quickly degenerated into indiscriminate massacres of the latter by the former. International observers reported the deaths of hundreds of Baluba on 29 and 30 August. Colonel Mobutu ended the campaign on 1 September without consulting the government. Hammarskjöld found the event to be "a case of incipient genocide" and believed that Lumumba, having given the orders to commence the offensive in an "almost casual manner", had lost all sense of responsibility. The American press depicted the Prime Minister's regime as a Soviet puppet and dependent on Soviet aid. Western opinion held him at fault for the atrocities. The violence and ultimate failure of the anti-secessionist push greatly damaged the government's faltering reputation.

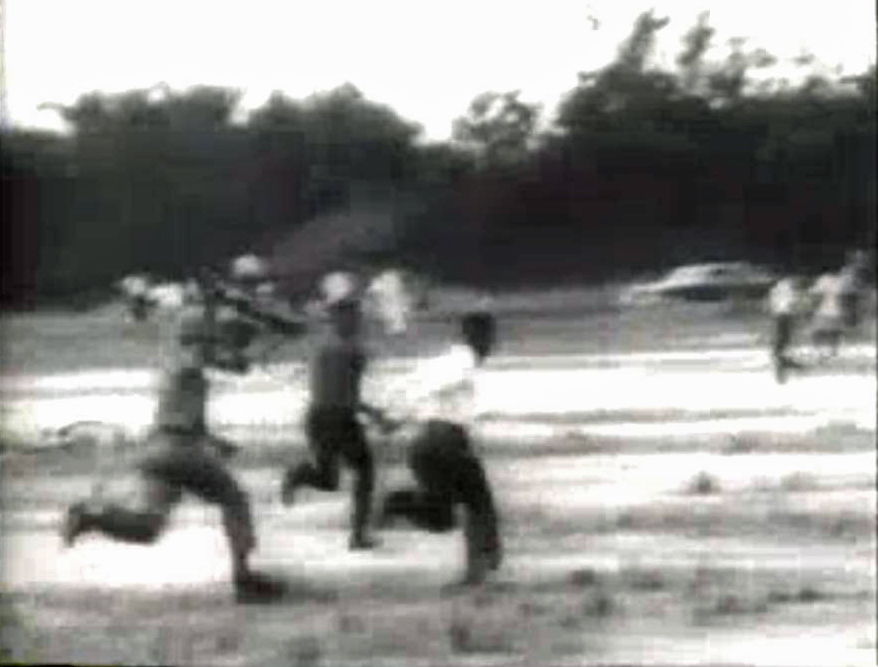
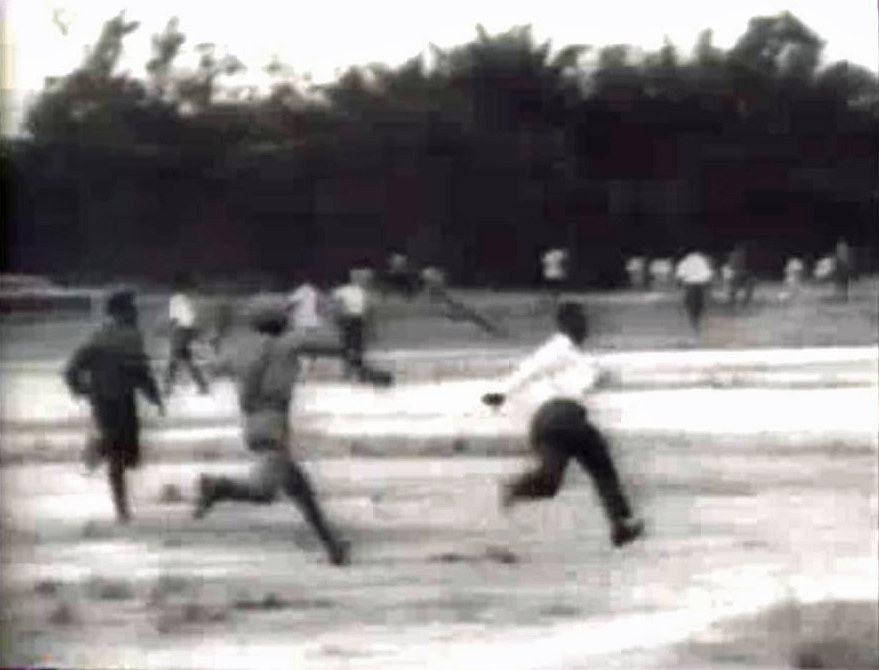
A soldier throwing his rifle at a protester on 25 August, the first day of the Pan-African Conference

While the operation was underway, Lumumba sought African support for the anti-secessionist campaign and proceeded with the Pan-African Conference in Léopoldville. Representatives from 13 independent countries and four nationalist movements attended. The opening of the conference on the morning of 25 August was marred by large demonstrations from ABAKO, PUNA, and MNC-K supporters outside the meeting hall. Police fired into the air to disperse the crowd, inciting panic and greatly disturbing the foreign delegations. In his opening speech, Lumumba spoke broadly and appealed to African unity. Almost all of the delegations recommended that the attack on Katanga be halted and that the Congolese government mend its relations with the UN. Lumumba was disappointed by their attitude and realised that he would not be able to secure their military support and that rapprochement with the UN was necessary. Nevertheless, he was not dissuaded from pursuing the South Kasai–Katanga offensive; on 27 August he flew to Stanleyville to rally reinforcements for the campaign.

Back in the capital, Bomboko chaired the Pan-African Conference. The foreign delegations variously encouraged stronger discipline of the army, better relations with the UN, and that the Congo had to decide whether or not to use force or negotiation against Katanga. In response, the Congolese representatives issued a new policy statement, clarifying that the government was not asking the African states or the UN to attack Katanga but only that the former provide it with technical assistance and refuse Tshombe aid and for peacekeepers to assist in the expulsion of Belgian troops. The statement further said that the government would not negotiate with Tshombe and that the ANC would attempt to occupy Katanga following the Belgian withdrawal and, that failing, an appeal for bilateral African military aid might be made. The foreign delegations accepted the new policy, believing that the offensive against Katanga would soon fail and that they could later mediate a resolution to the secessionist dispute. Following the conference various African diplomats urged UN officials to warm their relations with Lumumba and to encourage more cooperation between him and Kasa-Vubu. Hammarskjöld complained that the "spirit of reconciliation" had "gone far too far on the line of compromise", and said that the "utterly incompetent" Lumumba Government had a "complete misconception of [its] rights in relation to the UN and [its] own role in the world." He also added that the Prime Minister should be "forced to constitutionality".

== Dissolution ==
=== Dismissal of Lumumba and formation of the Iléo Government ===
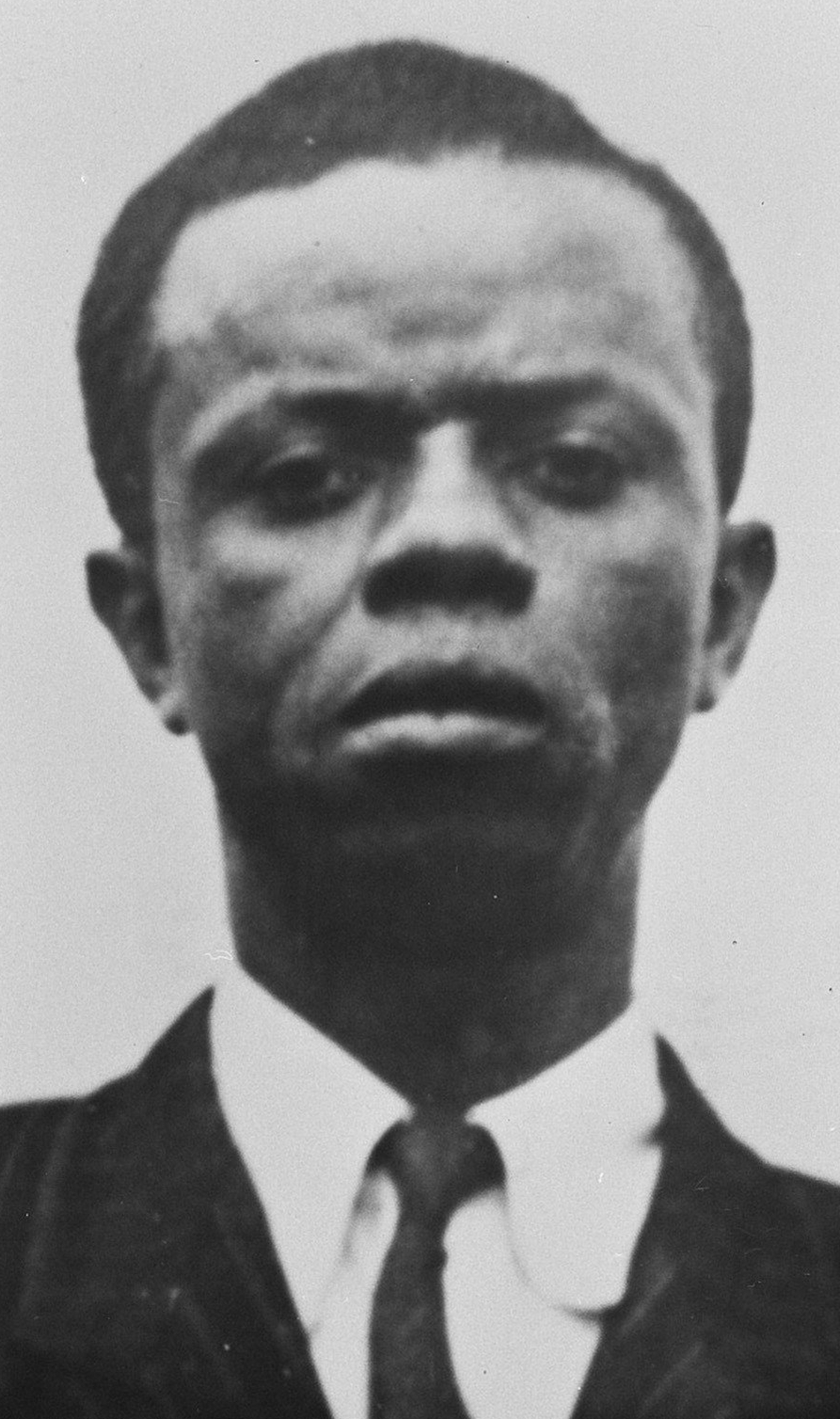
Joseph Iléo, appointed by Kasa-Vubu to replace Lumumba

Throughout August, President Kasa-Vubu became increasingly bothered by Lumumba's growing authoritarianism, the collapse in administration, and the enlarging prospects of civil war. On 3 September he summoned Andrew Cordier (Bunche's interim replacement) to communicate that he was considering dismissing the Prime Minister. (Note: The full motives behind Kasa-Vubu's decision are not agreed upon. He told a parliamentary commission on 9 September that members of the government were becoming authoritarian, and complained that he was not consulted in their actions. According to Young, he feared a pro-Lumumba coup would take place and sought to preempt it. Young further stated that there was evidence to suggest that Lumumba was growing impatient with the parliamentary system and was seeking to institute his own centralised presidency to achieve his agenda, but did not begin to formulate such plans until he grew suspicious of his opponents' own intentions to depose him. Hoskyns wrote that Kasa-Vubu was becoming increasingly agitated by Lumumba's style of governance and, facing pressure from ABAKO, Adoula, and Iléo, sought to curtail what he perceived as the Prime Minister's harmful actions. Hoskyns further posited that by dismissing Lumumba Kasa-Vubu only wished to exercise a measure of control over him and that he was prepared to then negotiate a political compromise with Lumumba that would potentially lead to his inclusion in the next government. According to Weissman, classified United States Central Intelligence Agency documents indicated that Kasa-Vubu was bribed by the American government into firing Lumumba, as part of a larger plot that would involve a no-confidence vote in Parliament on 8 September rigged by Adoula and Iléo followed by the resignations of all ABAKO and PUNA ministers and public protests. He also wrote, "It appears unlikely that Kasa-Vubu would have gone ahead [with the dismissal] without outside support.") Cordier reported the development back to Hammarskjöld, who noted that a "complete disintegration of authority" could follow such an action.

At 20:12 on 5 September Kasa-Vubu announced the dismissal of Lumumba, along with Deputy Prime Minister Gizenga, Minister of Justice Mwamba, Minister of Interior Gbenye, Minister of Information Kashamura, Secretary of State Bolamba, and Secretary of State Lumbala over the radio. He stated that Iléo would form a new government. After Lumumba heard of the firing he held heated discussions with his ministers and made three broadcasts, defending his government and declaring Kasa-Vubu to be deposed. Kasa-Vubu had not declared the approval of any responsible ministers of his decision, making his action legally invalid. (Note: Article 22 of the Loi Fondamentale read, "The President names and revokes the Prime Minister." There was no elaboration on the point, and nowhere else in the document were the nature or limits of the power explained, including whether or not parliamentary approval was necessary. However, it was stipulated that any action undertaken by the President had to be countersigned by a minister responsible to Parliament.) Later that day Kasa-Vubu managed to secure the countersignatures of Delvaux and Bomboko to his order. With them, he re-announced his decision over Brazzaville radio. (Note: Delvaux's signature was unsurprising to most observers, but Bomboko's was unanticipated. Bomboko explained his reasoning to the press in late September, expressing his feelings that Lumumba had failed to cooperate with the UN and "tolerated" the ANC's harassment of ONUC personnel, "thus disqualifying our young nation in the eyes of the world". He also claimed that the Prime Minister had not stemmed the mistreatment of foreigners and bypassed him in seeking bilateral aid outside of the UN effort. He may have also been "paid" by United States or Belgian officials at the time.) While the dismissals were recognised, the reigning government was, according to Belgian tradition, legally in place until a full administration was formed that could replace it—though Lumumba's opponents disputed such a view. Kasa-Vubu theorised that Iléo could work with the ministers that had not been revoked until he had a government ready for a parliamentary vote. (Note: Young wrote that "legally a Prime Minister designate is considered provisionally to be in office until he wins or loses his vote of confidence, and a revoked Prime Minister leaves office immediately.") Despite the confusion, Lumumba was still able to exercise his powers and resumed the military campaign against South Kasai and Katanga.

Lumumba and the ministers who remained loyal to him ordered the arrest of Delvaux and Bomboko for countersigning the dismissal order. On 7 September the Chamber convened to discuss Kasa-Vubu's dismissal order. Delvaux made an unexpected appearance and took to the dais to denounce his arrest and declare his resignation from the government. The Chamber voted to annul both Kasa-Vubu's and Lumumba's declarations of dismissal, 60 to 19. The following day the Senate delivered the government a vote of confidence, 49 to zero with seven abstentions. (Note: According to de Witte, the vote was tallied as 41 to two with six abstentions.) Many of the deputies were nonetheless still upset by Lumumba's style of governance. The legislature felt that an understanding needed to be reached between the President and the Prime Minister to facilitate the return of stable government. The Chamber thus voted to establish a commission of reconciliation to seek a compromise between the two. The commission exacted a promise from Lumumba to reshuffle the Council of Ministers and govern with the assistance and supervision of another parliamentary commission (which never materialised). Other attempts at reconciliation were under taken by foreign diplomats in Léopoldville.

Over the next few days little activity was undertaken by Parliament or the Council of Ministers. Lumumba declared himself to still be the legal prime minister and delivered rhetorical attacks against his political opponents. According to Article 51, Parliament was granted the "exclusive privilege" to interpret the constitution. Despite this, Lumumba ignored Serge Michel's urges that he secure a formal vote of constitutional interpretation from Parliament in rejection of the Kasa-Vubu's dismissal order. (Note: The constitutionality of the revocation is disputed. De Witte described Kasa-Vubu's dismissal order as "clearly not constitutional" and labeled the invoked Article 22 as a "totally obsolete" provision which could only be resolved "by a law or revision of the constitution, passed by a parliament with confidence in Lumumba." Evan Luard wrote, "Of Kasa-Vubu's move [...] it can reasonably be said that by the way he used his power without referring to Parliament amounted to an abuse of the constitution". Bomboko released a statement in late September that asserted that while "normally" a government under the constitution would be unseated by a censure from Parliament, "On occasion [the President] can revoke a government when this measure is deemed necessary for any grave reason. In this case, the Parliament is not, and cannot, be invited to vote its confidence or lack of confidence in the government." Hoskyns wrote, "From a legal point of view it would seem therefore that Kasa-Vubu's initial action was in accordance at least with the letter of the Loi Fondamentale". Hammarskjöld told the Security Council that "The president has the right to revoke the mandate of the prime minister.") On 9 September he announced that he had assumed the responsibilities of the Head of State, taken command of the ANC, and dismissed Bomboko, Delvaux, and Nkayi from his cabinet.

Iléo proclaimed his completed government on 10 September. According to Belgian tradition, an administration could assume its responsibilities as soon as it was proclaimed, before being subject to parliamentary approval. Among the declared ministers he retained from Lumumba's cabinet were MNC-L members Aloïs Kabangi, Alexandre Mahamba, and Alphonse Songolo and CEREA member Marcel Bisukiro. Kabangi subsequently refused to accept the post. Kisolokele remained a minister of state and Bolya was made Minister of Health. Kalonji, though he did not retract his secessionist project, accepted the post of Minister of Justice. Iléo did not present his government to Parliament for a vote of confidence, and even if he had it was unlikely that he would secure its support. Kasa-Vubu issued an ordinance relieving Kamanga, Rudahindwa, and Lutula of their duties.

On 13 September Parliament convened in a joint session to discuss the political impasse. Lumumba appealed to them to grant him "full powers" to manage the country's crisis but assured that he was ready to seek an understanding with rival political factions. Parliament passed a resolution in accordance with Lumumba's wishes but also established a commission to oversee the government's implementation of the powers. However, the authenticity and legality of the vote was highly questionable. (Note: Firstly, pro-Lumumba soldiers were inside the Palais de la Nation during the session. Secondly, it is likely that the quorum of 112 (69 for the Chamber and 43 for the Senate) was never achieved. According to official records, 70 deputies and 43 senators were in attendance (113 parliamentarians). This contrasts with journalist accounts, which fix the number between 90 and 95 parliamentarians. The vote was initially tallied as 88 to one with three abstentions, which would support the journalists' evaluations. The count was later modified to read 88 to 25 with three abstentions. Lumumba for his part was not troubled by the discrepancy and viewed the vote as a political victory. On 5 September the President of the Chamber had declared that in light of the secessions of Katanga and South Kasai—and the withdrawal of their parliamentarians from the capital—the quorum for the Chamber was lowered to 65.) The legislature also instituted a new commission to modify the composition of the Lumumba Government. Fearing that the Iléo Government would never secure a vote of confidence, Kasa-Vubu proceeded to adjourn Parliament for one month. (Note: The adjournment order was countersigned by Iléo. Parliament rejected it because Iléo had never presented himself for confirmation. A presidential adjournment of Parliament also required consultation with the Council of Ministers and the presiding officers of each house, which Kasa-Vubu never sought.)

=== Mobutu's coup and the College of Commissioners-General ===
On 14 September, Mobutu announced over the radio that he was launching a "peaceful revolution" to break the political impasse and therefore neutralising the President, Lumumba's and Iléo's respective governments, and Parliament until 31 December. He stated that "technicians" would run the administration while the politicians sorted out their differences. In a subsequent press conference he clarified that Congolese university graduates would be asked to form a government. Lumumba and Kasa-Vubu were both surprised by the coup. (Note: Various sources state Mobutu's action was encouraged and supported by Belgium and the United States.) Mobutu shortly thereafter terminated the ANC campaign against Katanga and South Kasai.

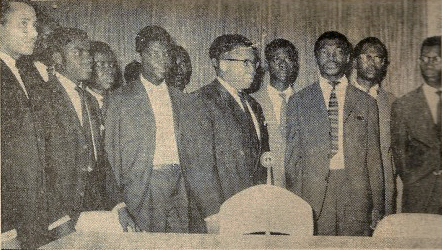
President Kasa-Vubu with the College of Commissioners-General

On 20 September Mobutu announced the formation of the College of Commissioners-General under the chairmanship of Bomboko. Soldiers expelled the remaining politicians from their offices. Of the Commissioners-General, four had each served as chef de cabinet. Both Kanza and Mandi were invited to join the college, but they became disturbed by the body's inclination towards Kasa-Vubu and summarily refused to participate in the administration. Their abstention allowed the government's anti-Lumumba slant to worsen without restraint. Further attempts by African diplomats to reconcile Lumumba and Kasa-Vubu were unsuccessful.

Following brief incarceration by Mobutu's troops, Gizenga drove to Stanleyville. Lumumba continued to hold meetings with members of his government, senators, deputies, and political supporters, issue public statements, and maintain that he still held power. Frustrated by the way he was being treated by Lumumba and facing intense political pressure, by the end of the month Mobutu was no longer encouraging reconciliation and had aligned himself with Kasa-Vubu. He ordered ANC units to surround Lumumba's residence, but a cordon of UN peacekeepers prevented them from making an arrest, and Lumumba was thus confined to his home.

On 11 October Kasa-Vubu issued a "constitutional decree-law" officiating the establishment of the College of Commissioners-General, asserting his right as Head of State to appoint and dismiss its members, adjourning Parliament indefinitely, and conferring all legislative authority prescribed to Parliament by the Loi Fondamentale to the college. (Note: Mabika Kalanda, a member of the College, retrospectively challenged Kasa-Vubu's order as overstepping the authority of the Presidency, noting that part of the Loi Fondamentale read, "the Head of State has no powers other than those formally conferred upon him by this fundamental law".) In time, the college would come to bring about the restoration of some order to the administration that had been lost during the Lumumba Government's tenure. Lumumba frequently attacked the body's credibility. Songolo denounced Lumumba and endorsed the college, but was subsequently arrested by Stanleyville authorities. As the end of the year approached Mobutu postponed the return to normal governance indefinitely.

=== Lumumba's attempted escape and the flight of his ministers ===
Once confined in Léopoldville, Lumumba began drafting plans to reassert his authority. In a letter dated 17 September addressed to Nkrumah, he stated his intention to relocate his government to Stanleyville. By October, Lumumba's supporters were convinced that few of their goals could be achieved through the College of Commissioners.

"The overthrow of the Lumumba Government meant in fact the overthrow of an independent democratic state with a puppet state its government being either military or civilian. The pattern of the Congo was to be repeated in the decade of the sixties with independent democratic governments being overthrown and puppet regimes installed. The UN vote to seat the Kasa-Vubu delegation showed a new trend."

— Kerrim Essack

In New York Kanza reunited with his delegation to represent the Lumumba Government at the UN. His appearance generated hope among Lumumba's supporters that the domestic crisis could be resolved in their favour. Kasa-Vubu dispatched his own delegation. On 20 September the Congo was officially admitted into the UN, but its seat in the General Assembly was left vacant and the issue over which delegation should be seated was referred to the Credentials Committee. After several delays, on 22 November the General Assembly resolved to seat Kasa-Vubu's delegation. The extension of UN recognition to Kasa-Vubu's delegation definitively ended Lumumba's hopes of a legal return to power.

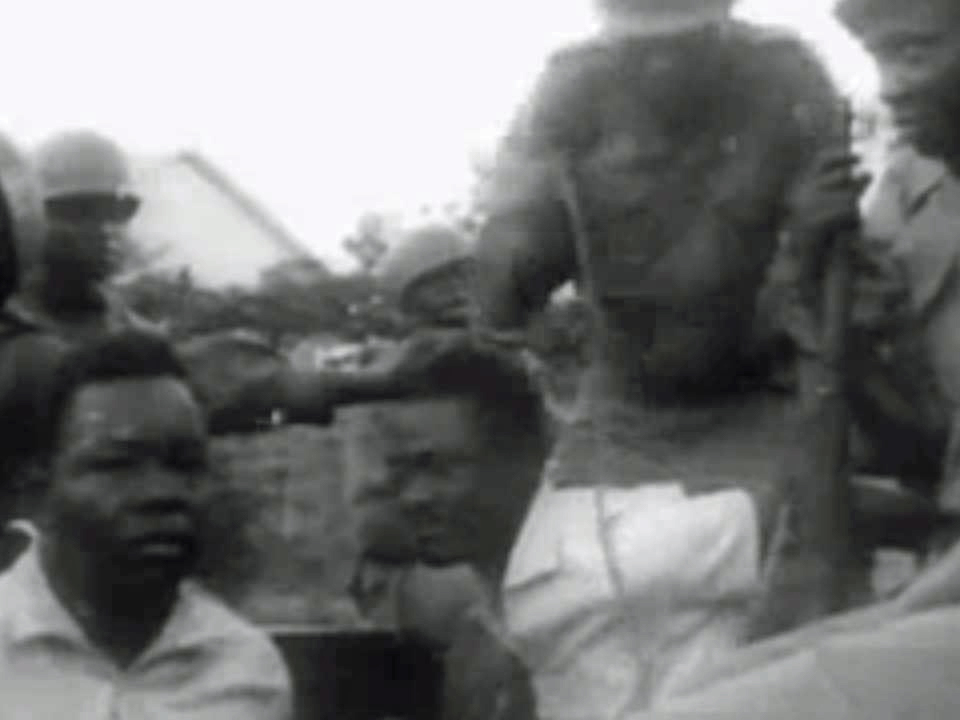
Lumumba (center), detained by Mobutu's soldiers, before transport to Thysville

Following his return to the Congo, Kanza avoided arrest by taking refuge in his apartment in a building protected by the UN. The loyal members of Lumumba's government that remained in the capital frequently visited Kanza's apartment to make phone calls to Lumumba on a UN line. On a 26 November phone call, Lumumba shared his intention with Kanza and several other ministers to escape house arrest and go to Stanleyville. He subsequently left the capital in a convoy with Mwamba and Mulele. On 1 December Mobutu's troops caught up with his party as it crossed the Sankuru river. They arrested Lumumba and returned him to Léopoldville. He was subsequently imprisoned at the army camp in Thysville and it was stated that he would be tried for inciting rebellion. Mwamba and Mulele safely crossed the Sankuru and spent several days in the bush before reaching Stanleyville.

Other members of the Lumumba Government fled to the east, some simply because they felt threatened in Léopoldville. Kashamura, Lutula, and Gbenye reached Stanleyville without much difficulty. Kanza, fearing arrest, fled to Brazzaville and sought asylum in Guinea, where he was recognised by President Ahmed Sékou Touré as an official representative of the Lumumba Government. Kanza was later joined there by Kiwewa. Mandi was smuggled out of the Congo by Mobutu, his personal friend, who feared for his safety. Mbuyi attempted to rendezvous with the Lumumbists in Stanleyville but was killed in the Charlesville region. Mpolo also intended on reaching the city, but was arrested in Mushie. He was later transferred to the base in Thysville, along with political ally Vice President of the Senate Joseph Okito. Believing Lumumba to no longer be of much political importance, the United States and Belgium suspended their assassination operations.

== Aftermath ==
=== Gizenga's regime ===
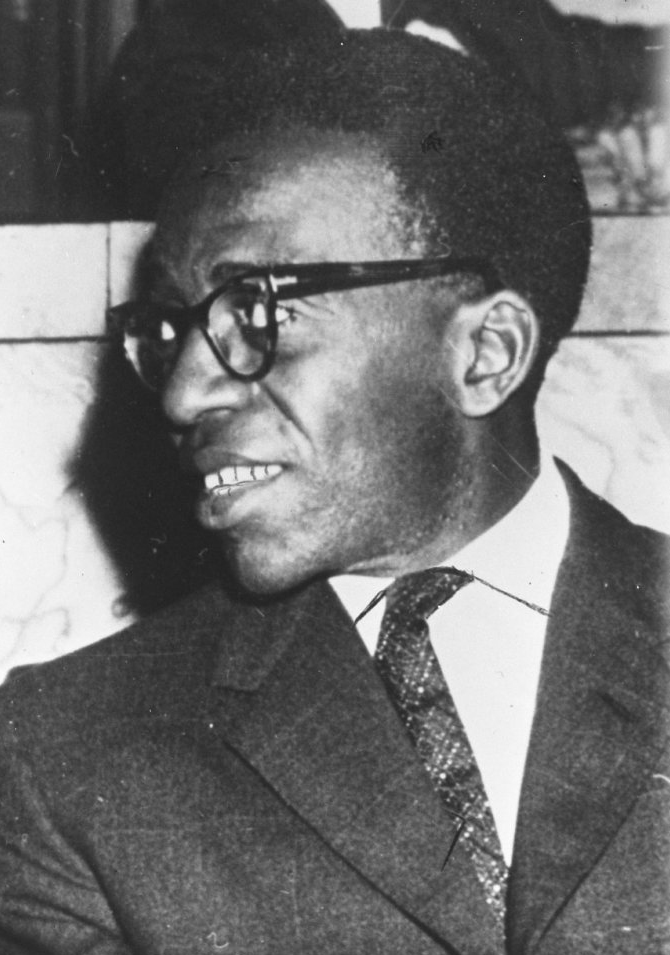
Antoine Gizenga, Lumumba's Deputy Prime Minister and founder of the pro-Lumumba regime in Stanleyville

After Kasa-Vubu's delegation was recognised at the UN, the Lumumbists accelerated their plans to establish a new regime in Orientale Province. The final decision to declare a rival regime was not taken until after Lumumba's arrest. On 12 December, Gizenga announced that Stanleyville was the new capital of the Congo. As Lumumba was detained, he declared that he would provisionally assume the role of head of government. Meanwhile, Gbenye, Mwamba, Rudahindwa, Bisukiro, and Lutula, having successfully evacuated to Stanleyville, were given the same posts they had held under Lumumba in Gizenga's government. Kiwewa was appointed ambassador to Ghana, Guinea, and Mali. Mulele was put in charge of all of Gizenga's diplomatic posts abroad. He was stationed in Cairo and was quickly joined by Mandi.

A major reorganisation of the local army units was undertaken and pro-Mobutu elements were purged. In late December, the regime extended its control over Kivu and Kashamura was placed in charge of its provincial administration. Despite the military power it possessed, the Stanleyville government never established an extensive administrative structure, instead functioning in the manner of a government in exile.

=== Death of Lumumba ===
"Had [Lumumba] not been assassinated, he would certainly have come back as head of the government. His political enemies both inside and outside the Congo were as convinced of this as we were. Murder was in fact the only sure means of preventing his return to power."

— Thomas Kanza

On 13 January 1961, the discipline of the Thysville garrison faltered, and soldiers sympathetic to Lumumba unlocked his cell. Kasa-Vubu, Mobutu, and Bomboko managed to restore order through negotiation, but concluded that Lumumba was too controversial a prisoner to be kept at the camp. Over the next few days there was discussion among the central government concerning his ultimate "elimination". (Note: It is disputed which officials were informed of or involved in the discussions. According to Hoskyns, Kasa-Vubu and Bomboko are both heavily implicated. De Witte suggested that in addition to them Mobutu, ministers of the Belgian government, and Katangese officials all participated.) On 17 January the central government flew Lumumba, Mpolo, and Okito to Élisabethville. That night all three were driven into the nearby forest and, in the presence of the Katangese cabinet and numerous Belgian advisers, were shot by a firing squad. Yav, serving as Katanga's Minister of Defence, chose not to attend the execution of his former colleagues.

On 13 February Munongo announced at a press conference that Lumumba and his two associates had been killed by angry villagers while attempting to escape custody. His story was not widely trusted. The public was shocked upon hearing about Lumumba's death. Soon thereafter it became known that a group of Lumumbist politicians—held as political prisoners by the central government—which had been transferred to South Kasaï were executed by local authorities for "crimes against the Luba people". Lumbala was among them. Kamanga, who was put through a traditional tribunal with the others, was sentenced to five years' imprisonment but was released in March. The killings enraged Gizenga's troops, and on 20 February a Stanleyville firing squad executed 15 political prisoners, including Songolo. Hoping to defuse the situation, the Léopoldville authorities opened serious negotiations with Gizenga's regime.

On the international level, the announcement of Lumumba's death led several Eastern Bloc and African states to declare that Gizenga's regime was the sole legal government of the Congo. On 21 February the UN Security Council passed a resolution that permitted ONUC to use military force as a last resort to prevent civil war, established a commission to investigate the deaths of Lumumba, Mpolo, and Okito, and called for the reconvening of Parliament to restore democratic processes to the government.

=== Adoula Government and "reconciliation" ===
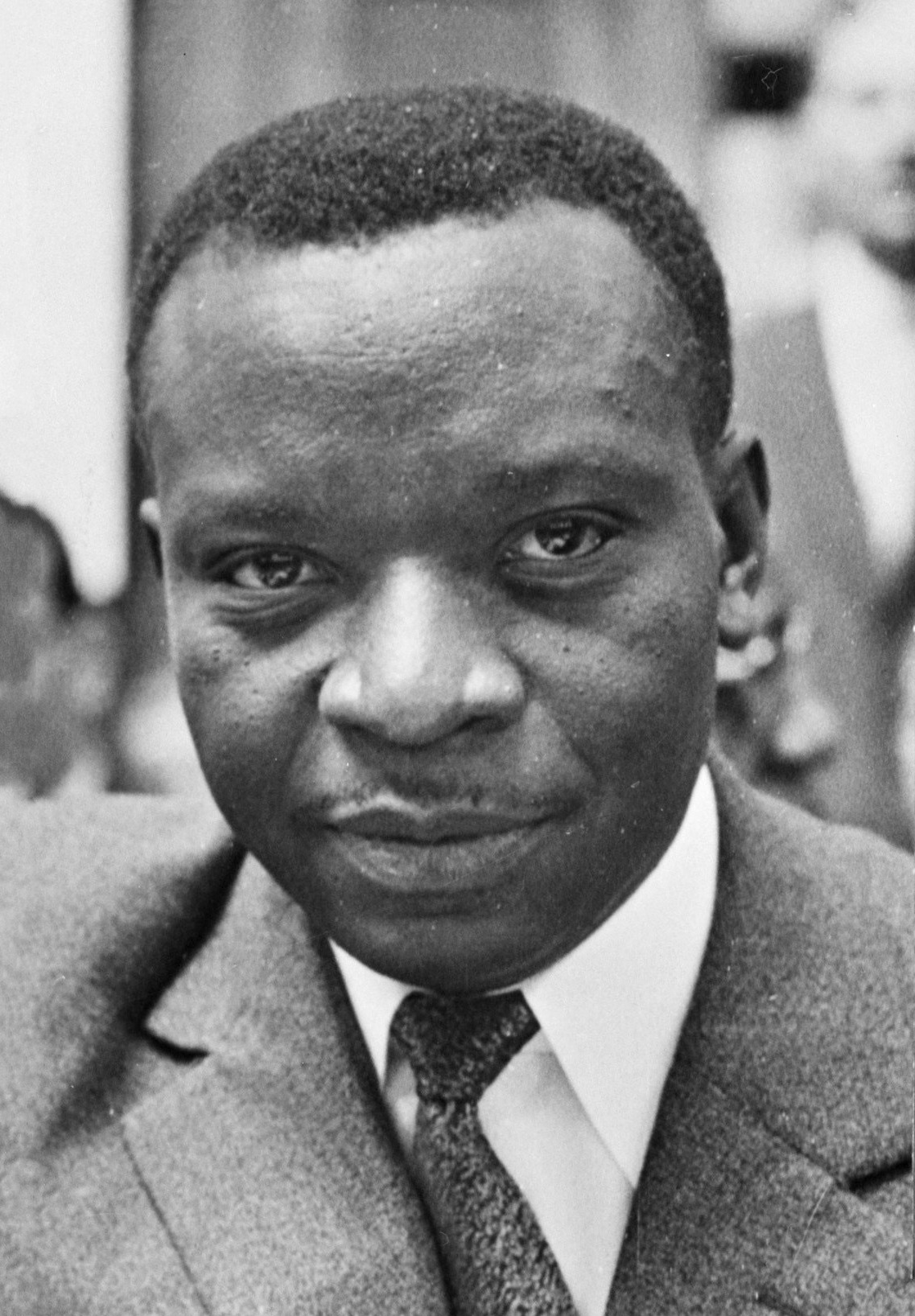
Cyrille Adoula, the Prime Minister confirmed by the reconvened Parliament

In an attempt to indicate a reorientation towards legality, the College of Commissioners was dissolved by Kasa-Vubu on 9 February 1961 and replaced by a new cabinet under Iléo. Bomboko returned to his post as Minister of Foreign Affairs, and Adoula became Minister of Interior. After several failed attempts at rapprochement with Tshombe, the Iléo Government turned towards the Stanleyville regime to strengthen its position against Katanga. This culminated in the decision to reconvene Parliament with the participation of the senators and deputies representing constituencies under the control of both governments.

Parliament reconvened in isolation at Lovanium University in late July. The elections of new officers for the Chamber of Deputies and the Senate indicated a small pro-Lumumba/Gizenga majority. However, the United States believed the moderate Adoula, as a firm anticommunist who opposed Katanga's secession, was the best choice for prime minister. On 1 August Adoula was appointed formateur of a new government. The following day he presented his government to Parliament with himself as prime minister. Though Gizenga had remained in Stanleyville during the session, the office of Deputy Prime Minister was returned to his control. Of the other members of the Adoula Government Bomboko, Gbenye, Mwamba, Kabangi, Kamanga, Lutula, Ilunga, Rudahindwa, Bisukiro, Mahamba were all given the same posts that they had held in the Lumumba Government. Two were given different positions; Kisolokele was made Minister of Work and Social Welfare and Bolya was made Secretary of State for Justice. Delvaux and Kashamura were both absent from the government, the former because his loyalties were considered suspect by Parliament, and the latter because the repressiveness of his rule of Kivu Province had horrified his colleagues.

An intensive lobbying and bribery campaign conducted by Western espionage agencies ensured Adoula parliamentary support; the government was delivered a near-unanimous vote of confidence. The constitutional crisis provoked by Lumumba's revocation on 5 September 1960 was thus resolved, though several non-aligned states delayed their recognition of Adoula's government in preference to Gizenga, who they believed was Lumumba's proper successor. Gizenga used his position to pressure Adoula to take action against Katanga. The Adoula Government maintained that its foreign policy was a continuity of the Lumumba Government's, specifically with its stated pursuance of non-alignment and seeking of assistance from other African states. Regardless of the appearance of a coalition, Adoula's inclusion of the Lumumbists in his cabinet was only a gesture to temporarily stabilise his position; throughout 1962, Lumumbists were gradually purged from the government. Of the 23 ministers that were turned over during the year, 15 were supporters of Lumumba. By April 1963, only one out of the seven ministers and two secretaries of state from Gizenga's regime integrated into Adoula's government in 1961 remained.

=== End of the Congo Crisis and national ramifications ===
The South Kasaian secession was put down by the ANC in October 1962. That December Katangese forces attacked UN peacekeepers, prompting a strong counter-offensive that resulted in the collapse of the Katangese secession in January 1963. Nevertheless, suppression of the Lumumbists continued and the population grew increasingly discontent with the administration. In early 1964 leftist rebellions were initiated by Gbenye and Mulele with the goal of overthrowing Adoula. Tshombe was brought back into Congolese public life in July 1964, with Belgian encouragement, to replace Adoula as prime minister and suppress the insurrections. By 1965 the revolt was mostly defeated. Kasa-Vubu dismissed Tshombe in October and attempted to replace him, triggering another political crisis that led to Mobutu seizing power on 25 November. Under his rule, power was concentrated in the executive, a unitary state was established, and political activity was restricted. Gizenga fled the Congo after the 1965 coup and spent many years abroad trying to secure support to overthrow Mobutu. The prospect of multi-party elections in 1992 led him to return to the country and organise the Parti Lumumbiste Unifié. Mobutu was deposed in 1997. Gizenga served as Prime Minister of the Congo from 2006 until 2008.

== Legacy and historical evaluation ==
"Lumumba's administration in effect never got the chance to govern. Even in the prelude to independence, the Belgian government had accepted Lumumba as prime minister only reluctantly...In the crisis after independence, Belgium never seriously considered the option of reinforcing his government's authority and cooperating with him in restoring order."

— Scholar William Minter

The Lumumba Government proved unable to maintain its cohesiveness in the face of successive crises. Its weakness was in part derived from its origin as a coalition of unitarian and federalist elements; Lumumba faced intense opposition in the use of emergency powers from the federalists who feared he would employ them to construct a centralised state. The ministers had varying perceptions of the domestic situation and different ideas on how it could best be solved; the cabinet was thus never able to function smoothly. Political scientist Catherine Hoskyns asserted that had Kasa-Vubu and Lumumba not cooperated with each other so closely in July, the government would have collapsed much sooner than September. The Lumumba Government's weakness ultimately encouraged politicised ethnic elements to seek the institution of a more federalised constitution. One was adopted in 1964, dividing the six provinces into 21 new zones on the principles of ethnic and regional self-determination. Central authority was subsequently fragmented. The issues of federalism, ethnicity in politics and state centralisation were not resolved during the remainder of the Congo Crisis and partly contributed to a decline in support for the concept of the state among Congolese people.

The Lumumba Government's removal from power and Lumumba's subsequent death greatly damaged the Pan-Africanist movement. According to Adoula's administration, the absence of the Congo from multilateral discussions throughout 1961 caused the international community to "forget" the Pan-African goals of Lumumba's government. With the sole exception of the institution of the monetary council, under its rule no significant change was made to the Congo's financial structure. Undercut by the secessions and political infighting and lacking in international support, the government proved unable to reform the economy in Lumumba's nationalist fashion.

The international press viewed the government's tenure as one dominated by acute crisis and severe instability. Historian Jean-Claude Willame wrote that, in light of the difficult situation the Lumumba Government inherited, its time in power was worthy of a more nuanced appraisal. According to the Adoula Government, "Everything indicates that with the loyal cooperation of the Belgian troops, the government of Mr. Lumumba could have restored order all over the territory." Tukumbi Lumumba-Kasongo argued that the regime attempted to reform the state in a democratic fashion but was frustrated by foreign imperialists and their domestic allies. A 2010 editorial published by The Guardian asserted, "[T]he challenge of running a vast country whose population had been denied basic education by Belgian rulers interested only in exploiting its wealth would have sunk any government." According to Mueni wa Muiu and Guy Martin, Lumumba's administration "inherited an empty shell and empty coffers in lieu of a state" and "was definitively set up for failure".
