= Jean-Pierre Finant =

Congolese politician

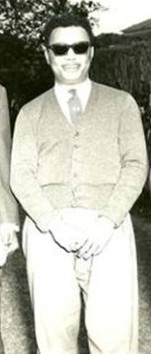

President of Oriental Province
- In office 11 June 1960 – 11 October 1960
- Succeeded by: Charles Badjoko

Personal details
- Born: 22 April 1922 Bondo, Belgian Congo
- Died: 13 February 1961 (aged 38) Bakwanga, South Kasai
- Party: Mouvement National Congolais

Jean-Pierre Finant (22 April 1922 – 13 February 1961) was a Congolese politician who served as the first President of Orientale Province in the Democratic Republic of the Congo (then Republic of the Congo) from June until October 1960.

== Biography ==
Jean-Pierre Finant was born on 22 April 1922 in Bondo, Belgian Congo to an Azande mother and a Belgian father. He undertook six years of primary and four years of middle education at the Ecole des Frères Maristes in Buta. After a one year training course at the Ecole Supérieure des Télécommunications in Léopoldville, he found work at the telecommunications service in Stanleyville. He held the post until 1960. He served as president of the Association du personnel des Télécommunications and was a member of the Association du Personnel Indigene de la Colonie (APIC) labour union. He was married and had five children, including future singer Abeti Masikini.

=== Political career ===
In 1959 Finant was elected to the council of the Mangobo commune. In October that year, he participated in a nationalist congress in Stanleyville. He later became the vice-president of the Orientale Province branch of the Mouvement National Congolais (MNC). In January–February 1960 he attended the Belgo-Congolese Round Table Conference in Brussels as a member of the MNC-Lumumba delegation. In March, he was appointed to the Executive College for Orientale Province.

In the general elections of May 1960 Finant was elected both as a deputy in both the Orientale Provincial Assembly and the national Chamber of Deputies. Though he won the latter seat with 20,854 preferential votes, he was persuaded by MNC leader Patrice Lumumba to forgo it in favor of the provincial position. He was subsequently elected President of Orientale Province on 11 June with 69 votes of the provincial assembly (out of a 72 possible votes). After independence, the Force Publique mutinied and the country plunged into disorder. During the crisis, he became increasingly loyal to the MNC and Lumumba, who was serving as Prime Minister. His fidelity to Lumumba remained strong even after the latter was removed from power.

Following a defection of deputies from the MNC and their denunciation of Lumumba, a group of disgruntled soldiers in Stanleyville attempted to overthrow the pro-Lumumba provincial government. On 4 October, Finant was placed under house arrest in Stanleyville under Colonel Joseph-Désiré Mobutu's orders. He escaped, but was recaptured seven days later and transferred to Luzumu Prison in the Lower Congo and held alongside other political prisoners. Over the next few days, more pro-Lumumba officials fled Léopoldville and took refuge in Stanleyville and the wider attempt to remove the provincial government failed. Finant's Minister of Agriculture, Charles Badjoko, took over the provincial presidency. Finant was later sent to Bakwanga, South Kasai where he was tried before a tribunal. He was found guilty and subsequently executed there on 13 February 1961 and buried alongside other executed political prisoners in a mass grave.
