= Alphonse Nguvulu =

Congolese politician

Minister of Labour and Social Welfare of the Republic of the Congo
- In office 17 April 1963 – June 1964
- President: Joseph Kasa-Vubu
- Prime Minister: Cyrille Adoula

Personal details
- Born: 19 September 1922 (age 103) Vista, Belgian Congo
- Party: Parti du Peuple

Alphonse Nguvulu Lubunda (born 19 September 1922) was a Congolese politician and diplomat.

== Early life ==
Alphonse Nguvulu was born on 19 September 1922 in Vista, Belgian Congo. He worked as a chief clerk for the Office of Secondary Technical Schooling and was a member of the Association du Personnel Indigene de la Colonie, a labour union. He also a member of the Fédération Générale du Travail de Belgique du Congo and for a time led its Léopoldville provincial committee.

== Political career ==
"His were the socialist ideas from the turn of the century; but, never having made any methodical study of the socialist theories to which he continually referred, his ideas were somewhat confused."

— Thomas Kanza's reflection on Nguvulu

Nguvulu was ideologically a Marxist socialist and he took a Marxist approach to analysing colonisation, stating that Africans were economically exploited for their labour and subject to racial discrimination because they were black. In late 1956 he founded and became president of Action Socialiste, a Congolese political party. In 1958 Nguvulu signed the "Motion to the Minister of the Belgian Congo", which demanded that Belgium grant the Congolese independence. Later that year he co-founded the Mouvement National Congolais, a nationalist Congolese political party, and served on its first national committee. On 26 April 1959 he co-founded the socialist Parti du Peuple (PP) with other members of Action Socialiste and became its president. He resigned from the MNC to devote his political activities to the PP. Since the Belgian colonial administration had acquiesced to the concept of Congolese independence, Nguvulu believed that the MNC had succeeded in its original mission. He thus thought that the organisation should dissolve and that its members should become socialists, since socialism could provide the Congolese with a more specific platform for independence and social progress.

In early 1960 he participated in the Belgo-Congolese Round Table Conference in Brussels as a delegate for the PP. At his insistence, the Belgians and the Congolese held a subsequent Economic Round Table Conference to discuss the economic matters regarding Belgian decolonisation of the Congo. While there he advocated that the Belgian government assume partial responsibility for the Congo's debt and rejected the proposal of the Congo's participation in the European Economic Community. In April he attended the Belgian Communist Party Conference in Liège, maintaining that he was only there as an observer.

Later that year the Belgian Congo became independent as the Republic of the Congo. The MNC leader and Prime Minister, Patrice Lumumba, appointed Nguvulu Secretary of State for Economic Coordination and Planning in his government. The government was officially invested by Parliament on 24 June. On 17 April 1963 he was appointed by Prime Minister Cyrille Adoula as Minister of Labour and Social Welfare. In June 1964 he devised a plan for resolving the Congo Crisis, which involved the institution of a new transitional government, the creation of an economic and social council, and a roundtable discussion between different Congolese leaders. His tenure ended when the Adoula Government left office that month.

In 1973 Nguvulu was appointed Zaire's first Ambassador to the People's Republic of China. He arrived in China on 19 May to take up his post.
