= Belgo-Congolese Round Table Conference =

1960 meeting between Belgian and Congolese leaders

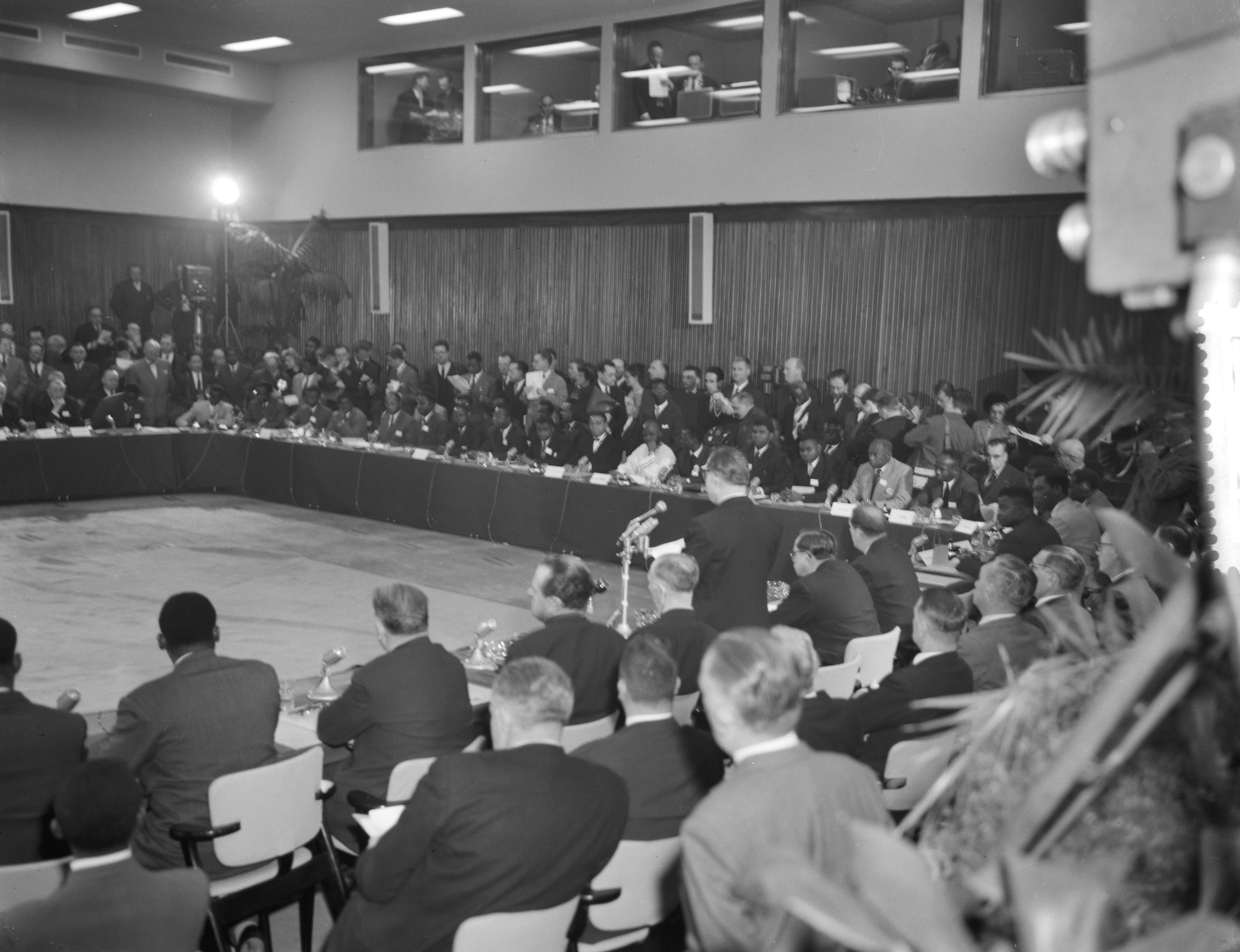
Opening meeting of the Belgo-Congolese Round Table Conference on 20 January 1960

The Belgo-Congolese Round Table Conference (French: Table ronde belgo-congolaise) was a meeting organized in two parts in 1960 in Brussels (January 20 – February 20 and April 26 – May 16) between on the one side representatives of the Congolese political class and chiefs (French: chefs coutumiers) and on the other side Belgian political and business leaders. The round table meetings led to the adoption of sixteen resolutions on the future of the Belgian Congo and its institutional reforms. With a broad consensus, the date for independence was set on June 30, 1960.

== Background ==
The idea for a round table conference was first formulated in 1959 by the Congolese Labour Party (PTC, French: Parti Travailliste Congolais). It gathered support from the Bakongo Alliance (ABAKO) and the Belgian Socialist Party (PSB). The idea of a bilateral conference aimed at organising the independence of the Belgian colony was in turn adopted by the Minister of the Belgian Congo and Ruanda-Urundi, August de Schryver, who was also the leader of the Christian Social Party, Belgium's largest political party at the time. Several factors contributed to this idea taking shape, including:

- Grassroots activism around popular figures like Joseph Kasa-Vubu and Patrice Lumumba
- The Léopoldville riots in January 1959, the worsening security climate and the rising feeling of insecurity among colonial settlers.
- The general sentiment of the inevitable and irreversible process of the decolonization of Africa.
- Deteriorating local economy (the public debt of the colony rose from 4 to 46 billion Belgian franc between 1949 and 1960).
- The failure of King Baudouin's second visit to the Belgian Congo in December 1959 which didn't allow the political tensions to be reduced.

The creation of a large scale Belgian-Congolese dialogue was also compatible with a speech from Belgian King Baudouin broadcast on January 13, 1959. Where he expressed the desire to "lead the Congolese populations, without harmful procrastination, but also without thoughtless haste, toward independence, in prosperity, and in peace."

On January 3, 1960, the Belgian government announced it was convening a round table conference with the goal of helping the Congolese transition from colonial rule to independence.

== The Congolese delegations ==
A number of traditional chiefs (chefs coutumiers) were invited to the Round Table Conference to reduce the proportion of key independence figures in the delegations. The following is a complete list of the Congolese delegates and their Belgian advisers to the first conference: (Note: Some individuals are only identified by their surname.)

=== Political parties ===
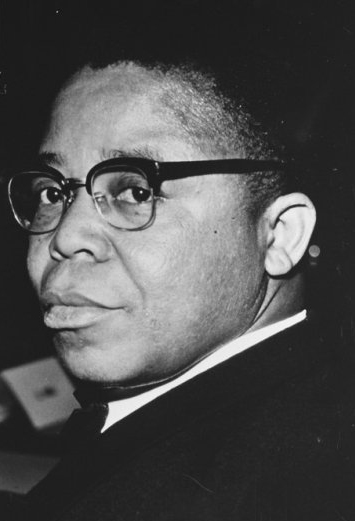
Kasa-Vubu seated at the Conference

- Alliance des Bakongo (ABAKO)
  - Effective members - Edmond Nzeza-Nlandu, Joseph Kasa-Vubu, Daniel Kanza
  - Deputy members - Philibert Luyeye, Simon Nzeza, Emmanuel Kini, Joseph Yumbu
  - Advisors - J. van Bilsen
- Alliance des Bayanzi (ABAZI)
  - Effective members - Gaston Midu
  - Deputy members - Wenceslas Mbueny
- Alliance Rural Progressiste (ARP)
  - Effective members - Gervais Bahizi, Sangara
  - Deputy members - Téodomie Nzamu Kwereka, Albert Kalinda
  - Advisers - Coulet
- Association Générale des Baluba du Katanga (BALUBAKAT)
  - Effective members - Jason Sendwe
  - Deputy members - Rémy Mwamba
  - Advisers - A. Doucy

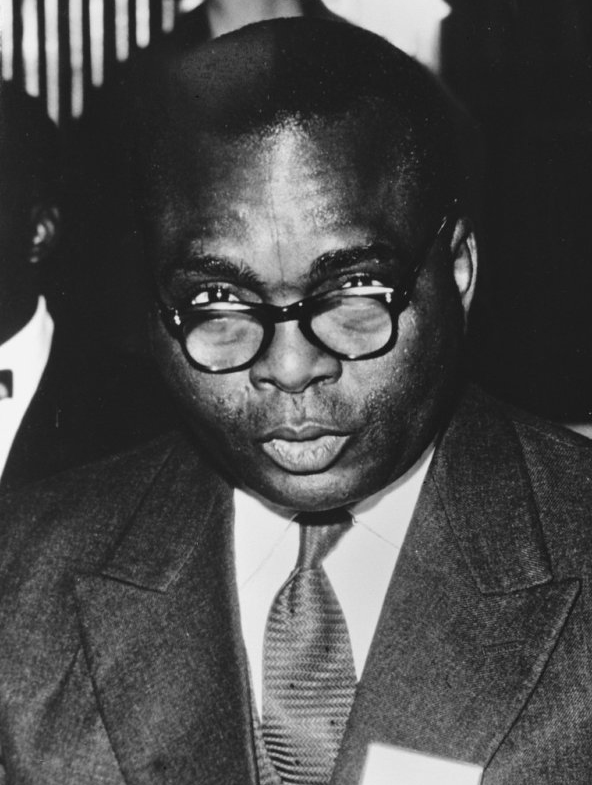
Jean Bolikango seated at the Conference

- Association des Ressortisants du Haut-Congo (ASSORECO)
  - Effective members - Jean Bolikango
  - Deputy members - Armand Bobanga
  - Advisers - Victor Promontorio
- Centre du Regroupement Africain (CEREA)
  - Effective members - Anicet Kashamura (later replaced by Jean-Chrysostome Weregemere)
  - Deputy members - Marcel Bisukiro
  - Advisers - J. Terfve
- Confédération des associations tribales du Katanga (CONAKAT)
  - Effective members - Moïse Tshombe, Jean-Baptiste Kibwe
  - Deputy members - Charles Mutaka, François Kasongo (later transferred and replaced by Prosper Muyumba)
  - Advisers - Humblet
- Federation Generale du Congo (FGC)
  - Effective members - Henri Kasongo
  - Advisers - Lacourt
- Mouvement National Congolais-Kalonji (MNC-K)
  - Effective members - Albert Kalonji, Joseph Iléo (until 15 January), Paul Ngandu (from 16 January)
  - Deputy members - Joseph Ngalula, Muamba, Pierre Missa-Kabu
  - Advisers - Jules Gérard-Libois

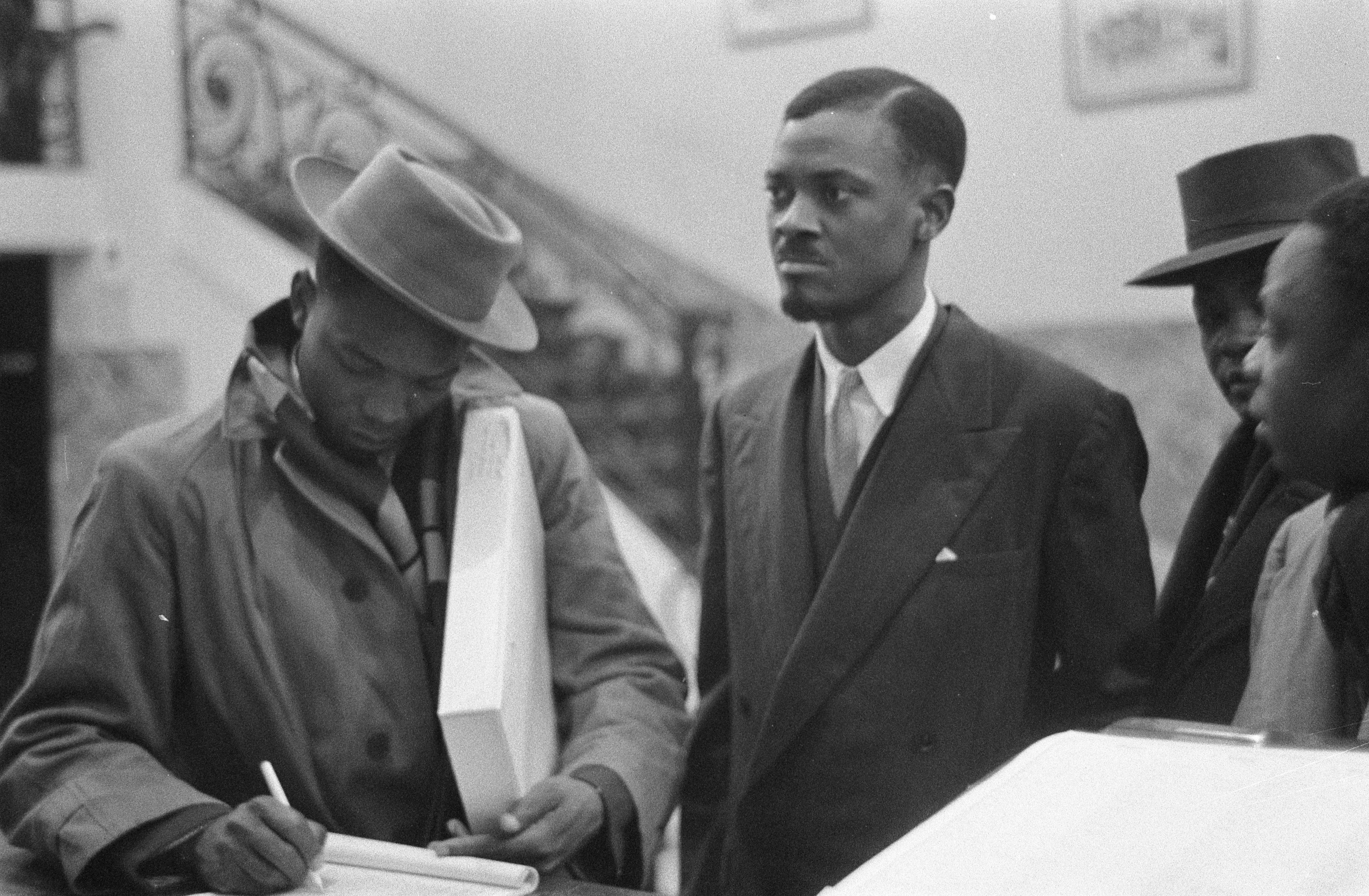
Patrice Lumumba with members of the MNC-L delegation

- Mouvement National Congolais-Lumumba (MNC-L)
  - Effective members - Patrice Lumumba, Joseph Kasongo, Jean-Marie Yumba
  - Deputy members - Sebastien Ikolo, Jean-Pierre Finant, Bruno Bukasa
  - Advisers - E. Loliki
- Parti National du Progrès (PNP)
  - Effective members - Jérôme Anany, Jean-Marie Kititwa, Alphonse Ilunga, Albert Delvaux, Antoine Lopes, André Anekonzapa, Paul Bolya, André-Marie Edindali, Ferdinand Essendja, Léopold Likinda, Sylvestre Mudingayi
  - Deputy members - Dominique Mubanga, Joseph Kulumba, Lius Witshima, Michel Atoka, Pierre Mombele, Ignoce Kanga, Revocato Kapepa, Gilbert Pongo, Romain Telu, Victor Kande, Ekwe
  - Advisers - H. Simonet, Lebrun, Cambier
- Parti du Peuple (PP)
  - Effective members - Alphonse Nguvulu
  - Deputy members - Antoine Mandungu
  - Advisers - F. Périn
- Parti Solidaire Africain (PSA)
  - Effective members - Cléophas Kamitatu, Sylvain Kama, Justin Matiti
  - Deputy members - Valentin Lubuma, Christian Mafuta
  - Advisers - Spitaels-Evrard
- Union Congolaise
  - Effective members - Gabriel Kitenge
  - Deputy members - Joseph Shango
  - Advisers - A. Rubbens

=== Tribal chieftains ===
- Équateur Province
  - Effective members - Jean-Médard Ilumbe, Eugéne N'Djoku, Innocent Abamba
  - Deputy members - Léon Engulu, Mwanga, Mosamba
- Kasaï Province
  - Effective members - Jonas Mangolo, Emeri Penesenga
  - Deputy members - Michel Ohanga, Louis Tshimbambe, Emery Wafwana, Katomba (from 13 February)
- Katanga Province
  - Effective members - Paul Bako Ditende, Antoine Mwenda-Munongo
  - Deputy members - Léon Ilunga, Kasembe, Kabembe
- Kivu Province
  - Effective members - Henry Simba, Omari Penemizenga
  - Deputy members - Joseph Tshomba
- Léopoldville Province
  - Effective members - Michel Mputela
  - Deputy members - Henri Ilenda
- Orientale Province
  - Effective members - François Kupa, Sabiti Mabe
  - Deputy members - Busimbo Yaele, Joachim Bateko, Joseph Lionga

==== Advisers ====
- J. Maisin
- G. Mineur

=== Other ===
Edouard Bayona, a Congolese attaché to the Belgian government, was appointed to attend the conference. Journalist and future Congolese dictator Joseph-Désiré Mobutu attended the conference as Patrice Lumumba's secretary.

== Belgian delegation ==
On the Belgian side, among others, the following people were present:

- Gaston Eyskens, Prime Minister
- Albert Lilar, vice Prime Minister
- August De Schryver, Minister of the Belgian Congo and Ruanda-Urundi;
- Arthur Gilson, Defence Minister
- Pierre Harmel, Minister for the Civil Service

Étienne Davignon, future vice-president of the European Commission, was also at the conference attached to the Belgian Ministry of Foreign Affairs

== Lumumba’s eligibility and arrival ==
One piece of important information regarding the Congolese delegation is the fact that Patrice Emery Lumumba was part of the original delegation. He was in prison. It’s Joseph Kasa-Vubu who put pressure on the Belgian government and demanded the release of Lumumba from prison so that he can join the original delegation in Belgium. Kasa-Vubu was the only person who fought for the release of Lumumba. Hence, the say “Kasa-Vubu made Lumumba as one of the fathers of the Belgian Congo independence… through his released from prison and his subsequent participation in the Round Table” (Nzita Na Nzita). In short “Et Kasa-Vubu ressuscita l’homme politique Lumumba” (Nzita Na Nzita). This is one of the reason Lumumba backed Kasa-Vubu candidacy for the presidency even though Abako was third in the May election (1960). The adage is simple “you scratch my back I’ll scratch yours in turn” which nowadays can be interpreted as a “win-win situation” for both Kasa-Vubu and Lumumba. In this respect, the Round Table organized a vote that consisted of fourteen questions. Question 9 dealt with Lumumba’s case since his criminal record was already tainted as he was already convicted by the colonial justice for embezzlement of public funds of the PTT (Telegraph and Telephone Post) of the city of Stanleyville. Question 9 was formulated as follows: ”Is it necessary to provide for a softening to the exclusion provisions at eligibility (amendment written by ABAKO-PSA-MNC-PP) so as to enable Lumumba's eligibility?” The result was as follows: Out of the 11 political groups, six political groups voted "yes". They included Cartel (Abako; M. N.C.-Kalonji; P.S.A.; Parti du Peuple; F.G.C.et Abazi), Cerea, M. N.C.-Lumumba, Assoreco, Cartel Katangais (Balubakat-Fedeko-Atcar) et Union Congolaise. Four political groups voted against the motion "no." They were P.N.P., Conakat, Alliance Rurale Progressiste (Kivu), and Délégation des chefs coutumiers. One political group, Union Congolaise, abstained.

== Ruanda-Urundi delegation ==
Representatives from Ruanda and Urundi attended in preparation for the independence of their respective territories.

=== Ruanda ===
- Gaspard Cyimana, 1st Minister of Finance of Rwanda
- Prosper Bwanakweli, Founder and President of RADER party

=== Urundi ===
- André Muhirwa, 3rd Prime Minister of Burundi
- Joseph Bamina, 6th Prime Minister of Burundi

== Prelude ==
On the eve of the conference the Congolese delegations held a series of meetings. Concern was expressed by Congolese students in Brussels that disunity in the Congo would prevent the delegates from taking advantage of Belgium's tenuous position. As a result, almost all of the delegations resolved to form a "Common Front" (Front Commun) to present their demands at the conference. That evening the Common Front released its first statement. It was demanded that the negotiations be more than consultative; all decisions reached should be made binding on the Belgian government. It also required that the Congo should immediately be granted independence. De Schryver and the Belgian delegation were shocked by the joint statement, having underestimated the full extent of Congolese discontent and their willingness to cooperate across party lines.

== First conference ==
The Round Table Conference was opened on January 20 with a speech by Belgian Prime Minister Gaston Eyskens.

== Results ==
At the end of the conference, the following notable resolutions were adopted:

- The declaration of independence of the Congo on June 30, 1960.
- The principles of the Congolese constitution, voted by the Belgian Parliament in May 1960.
- The structural organisation of the state and the separation of powers.

== See also ==
- Indépendance Cha Cha, independence song created in conjunction with the conference.
- Table Ronde, a song written about the conference
