= Port Francqui incident =

Congolese massacre event

- Part of the Congo Crisis
Date	April 28, 1961
Location	Port Francqui, Republic of the Congo
Result	ANC victory

Belligerents
(Democratic Republic of the Congo) ANC	(United Nations) ONUC: Ghana; Sweden; United Kingdom

Strength
Unknown	Roadblock: (Ghana) 2 platoons 1 reconnaissance detachment Port Francqui: (Ghana) 90 (Sweden) 3 (United Kingdom) 2

Casualties and losses
Roadblock: 2 killed	Roadblock: (Ghana) 1 killed 3 wounded Port Francqui: (Ghana) 43 killed (Sweden) 2 executed (United Kingdom) 2 executed

The Port Francqui incident, also known as the Port Francqui massacre, was an incident during the Congo Crisis where rogue Armed Forces of the Democratic Republic of the Congo (ANC) forces engaged in combat with UN peacekeepers, primarily from Ghana. The fighting resulted in the largest loss of life the Ghanaian Armed Forces have suffered while peacekeeping.

== Background ==
In October 1960, the Ghana Brigade of ONUC was deployed to Kasai.

== Prelude ==
On April 26, 1961, Minister of Interior of Luluabourg Province Emery Wafwana traveled to Port Francqui, where he made a public speech threatening to have the United Nations Operation in the Congo (UN) forces disarm the Armed Forces of the Democratic Republic of the Congo (ANC).

Wafwana was escorted by the UN to the Hôtel des Palmes to avoid roadblocks the ANC had illegally set up in the area, something the local UN forces had tolerated. Hôtel des Palmes was staffed by British Captain Ralph and Lieutenant Brown, Swedish Lieutenant Carl Wilhelm Böttiger and sergeants Egon Åberg and Lars Liedgren, between 20 and 25 Ghanaian soldiers with doctors of various nationality. Between 65 and 70 other Ghanaian soldiers were dispersed in six places around town. The ANC arrived to complain about the speech, where they captured the Swedish and British Officers, who were beaten, before a Swedish doctor persuaded the ANC to release them. There were also reports that a Swedish Officer had hoisted a Compagnie du chemin de fer du bas-Congo au Katanga (BCK) flag on the hotel, which further angered the ANC. On April 27, the Ghanaian Brigade stationed at Luluabourg received a report of this incident, and two platoons and a reconnaissance contingent were transferred to Port Francqui as a relief force.

== Incident ==
On April 28, 1961, the Ghanaian Brigade from Luluabourg encountered one of the illegal ANC roadblocks, and unaware of the situation, fire was exchanged around 8:00 a.m. Ghanaian Private Bemoba was killed while three other Ghanaians were wounded. ANC Sergeant-Major Sangapai and Corporal Bayenga-Nwizi were both killed.

The ANC now felt they were under attack by the UN and determined to attack the Port Francqui garrison. The British and Swedish officers were taken prisoner and marched to the jungle. Officer Liedgren was forced to walk into the bush, where he was shot by the ANC. Next, Sergeant Åberg was ordered into the bush but the ANC rifle jammed, and he was ordered to flee by Captain Ralph, which he did while under fire. While Åberg got away, Ralph, Brown and Böttiger were killed and their bodies thrown into a nearby river.

Concurrently, the ANC attacked the Ghanaian forces of Port Francqui, who were scattered about in poor defensive positions and armed with obsolete No. 4 Lee-Enfield rifles, Sterling and M3 submachine guns and Bren light machine guns, whereas the ANC were armed with more modern AK-47 and FN FAL rifles, resulting in a massacre where roughly 43 Ghanaians were either killed or drowned attempting to escape in a nearby river.

== Aftermath ==
The UN investigated the incident, determining it had been caused by Wafwana's speech. General Henry Alexander, the chief of staff of the Ghanaian Army, attributed the affair to the UN officers' inexperience and the UN's insistence on using persuasion with factions in the Congo instead of armed force. The Ghanaian President Kwame Nkrumah rejected this explanation and instead said that it was Alexander's "duty to see that Ghanaian troops were not placed in the kind of impossible position they found themselves in at Port Francqui". As a result of the incident, Ghana's entire brigade was temporarily withdrawn from the Congo and from 1962 onwards its contribution to ONUC only amounted to one battalion.

According to Major Stig von Bayer, the incident was quickly suppressed by the UN. Those who were aware of it were placed under secrecy. 'Missing in action' was the message the families of the two soldiers in Sweden received. Bayer, served as a liaison officer and interpreter in the Congo. His documentation fills five large boxes in the Military Archives of Sweden in Stockholm. Major von Bayer's account: "Port Francqui, Congo, April 28, 1961. Three British officers belonging to the so-called Ghana Battalion and three Swedish soldiers, responsible for transportation and movements, were attacked by the Congolese national army. The Swedish soldiers, all 28 years old, and the British officers were dragged onto a path leading into a forest. There, they were shot. The Britons and two of the three Swedish soldiers were killed immediately. The third Swedish soldier managed to escape, hiding in the jungle, and was rescued the next day by UN troops. In the following days, the area was searched. There was no trace of the bodies." Later, Bayer arrived in the area, made contact with Congolese troops who, according to Bayer, said the following: 'The local population here took care of the British and Swedish bodies. They ate them. We apologize for this'. When Bayer consulted higher-ranking officials in the UN hierarchy about how to report this, he was ordered to omit the information about cannibalism.

== See also ==
- List of massacres in the Democratic Republic of the Congo

== Works cited ==
- Kotia, Emmanuel Wekem (2015). Ghana Armed Forces in Lebanon and Liberia Peace Operations. Bloomsbury Publishing USA. ISBN 9798881886684.
- Williams, Susan (2021). White Malice : The CIA and the Covert Recolonization of Africa. New York: PublicAffairs. ISBN 978-1-5417-6829-1.
