= Emery Wafwana =

Emery Wafwana (sometimes styled Wafuana) (born 1918) was a Congolese politician. He served as Minister of Interior of Luluabourg Province and was a member of the Chamber of Deputies.

== Biography ==
Emery Wafwana was born in 1918 in the Luluabourg territory, Belgian Congo to a Lulua family. He was a brother of Mwanangana Kalamba, the paramount chief of the Lulua. He worked as a merchant and served as president of the Union des Paysans et Ruraux Progressistes—an organisation affiliated with the Parti National du Progrès—and was a leading member of the Union National Congolaise (UNC). In the municipal elections of December 1959 he was elected to the council of the Ndesha commune of Luluabourg. He acted as an assistant delegate at the Belgo-Congolese Round Table Conference of January–February 1960. While there he and two other Lulua figures signed an agreement with the Belgian government in an attempt to settle the Lulua-Luba tribal conflict. The agreement was denounced by other Lulua leaders for making too many concessions to the Luba. In the national elections during May Wafwana was elected to the Chamber of Deputies on a UNC ticket with 22,285 preferential votes. Prime Minister Patrice Lumumba considered appointing him Minister of Middle Classes in the Congo's first independent government, but he was ultimately not chosen.

After Kasai Province was subdivided, Wafwana became Minister of Interior of the new Luluabourg Province. While in office he intervened in numerous judicial affairs, generating hostility between the provincial government and the Luluabourg Parquet. He had police dispatched by the parquet to execute a warrant arrested, and incited a mob to throw stones at a prosecutor. Together with Provincial President François Luakabuanga he instructed the Lulua in the locale of Kakenge to attack resident Bakuba, precipitating a collapse of order in the region. Wafwana also ordered the Lulua to stage assaults on the Bakuba around Kaulu, Kamponde, and Lubondaie, resulting in the destruction of 15 villages in December 1962 and the flight of 10,000 refugees into the bush. On 19 January 1963, under the instruction of the Luluabourg Parquet, Wafwana was arrested for abuse of power and involvement in the Kakenge disorders and imprisoned in Léopoldville. On 7 April he was released and returned to Luluabourg on the condition that he remain in the city pending the initiation of his trial. Later that month he led police in interrupting a meeting of the provincial assembly and arresting its members so as to prevent the body from censuring and unseating Luakabuanga's government. Wafwana then proceeded to use the police as he willed, including for the abduction of three assemblymen and their transfer to a relative's house so they could "disappear". He also entered the home of the President of the Assembly and assaulted the latter's wife. He later served as the director of the Luluabourg Province branch of the Rassemblement des démocrates congolaise, but eventually left the party.
