= King Baudouin speech (13 January 1959) =

Speech by the King of the Belgians

On 13 January 1959, King Baudouin addressed the nation by radio and declared that Belgium would work towards the full independence of the Belgian Congo.

== The King's role in the independence of the Belgian Congo ==
In the early 1950s, political emancipation of the Congolese elites, let alone of the masses, seemed like a distant event. But, it was clear that the Congo could not forever remain immune from the rapid changes that, after the Second World War, profoundly affected colonialism around the world. The independence of the British, French and Dutch colonies in Asia shortly after 1945 had little immediate effect in the Congo, but in the United Nations pressure on Belgium (as on other colonial powers) increased. Belgium had ratified article 73 of the United Nations Charter, which advocated self-determination, and both superpowers put pressure on Belgium to reform its Congo policy. However, the Belgian government tried to resist what it described as 'interference' with its colonial policy.

It became increasingly evident that the Belgian government lacked a strategic long-term vision in relation to the independence of the Belgian Congo. 'Colonial affairs' did not generate much interest or political debate in Belgium, so long as the colony seemed to be thriving and calm. A notable exception was the young King Baudouin, who had succeeded his father, King Leopold III, under dramatic circumstances in 1951, when Leopold III was forced to abdicate. Baudouin took a close interest in the Belgian Congo.

On his first state visit to the Belgian Congo in 1955, King Baudouin was welcomed enthusiastically by cheering crowds of whites and blacks alike, as captured in André Cauvin's documentary film, Bwana Kitoko. Foreign observers, such as the international correspondent of The Manchester Guardian or a Time journalist, remarked that Belgian paternalism "seemed to work", and contrasted Belgium's seemingly loyal and enthusiastic colonial subjects with the restless French and British colonies. On the occasion of his visit, King Baudouin openly endorsed the Governor-General's vision of a "Belgo-Congolese community"; but, in practice, this idea progressed slowly. At the same time, divisive ideological and linguistic issues in Belgium, which heretofore had been successfully kept out of the colony's affairs, began to affect the Congo as well. These included the rise of unionism among workers, the call for public (state) schools to break the missions' monopoly on education, and the call for equal treatment in the colony of both national languages: French and Dutch. Until then, French had been promoted as the unique colonial language. The Governor-General feared that such divisive issues would undermine the authority of the colonial government in the eyes of the Congolese, while also diverting attention from the more pressing need for true emancipation.

=== One year before independence ===
While the Belgian government was debating a programme to gradually extend the political emancipation of the Congolese population, it was overtaken by events. On 4 January 1959, a prohibited political demonstration organised in Léopoldville by ABAKO got out of hand. At once, the colonial capital was in the grip of extensive rioting. It took the authorities several days to restore order and, by the most conservative count, several hundred died. The eruption of violence sent a shock-wave through the Congo and Belgium alike. On 13 January, King Baudouin addressed the nation by radio and declared that Belgium would work towards the full independence of the Congo "without delay, but also without irresponsible rashness".

Without committing to a specific date for independence, the government of prime minister Gaston Eyskens had a multi-year transition period in mind. They thought provincial elections would take place in December 1959, national elections in 1960 or 1961, after which administrative and political responsibilities would be gradually transferred to the Congolese, in a process presumably to be completed towards the mid-1960s. On the ground, circumstances were changing much more rapidly. Increasingly, the colonial administration saw varied forms of resistance, such as refusal to pay taxes. In some regions anarchy threatened. At the same time many Belgians resident in the Congo opposed independence, feeling betrayed by Brussels. Faced with a radicalisation of Congolese demands, the government saw the chances of a gradual and carefully planned transition dwindling rapidly.

== King Baudouin's speech ==
King Baudouin addressed the nation, during a radio speech on 13 January 1959, on the road to independence of the Belgian-Congo.

=== Full Speech (translated to English) ===
The ultimate goal of our actions is, in prosperity and peace, to assist the Congolese people on their path to independence, without delay, but also without irresponsible rashness.

In a civilized world, the independence of a nation symbolizes, combines and guarantees the values of freedom, order and prosperity.

This goal however, can not be achieved without the following premises:

strong and fair governmental institutions;

a sufficient number of experienced government officials and clerks;

a solid social, economic and financial organization, in the hands of experts in these fields;

a broad intellectual and moral education of the people, without which, a democratic system will only be an excuse for ridicule, deception and oppression of the many by the few.

We aim to create these conditions, which are at the basis of true independence, with the utmost care, in a friendly and passionate cooperation, together with our African citizens.

It is not our intention to force European solutions onto the African peoples. On the contrary, we wish to promote the development of pragmatic policies and solutions, based on the African culture, that answer to the needs of the people.

== Events following the King's speech ==
In 1959, King Baudouin made another visit to the Belgian Congo, finding a great contrast with his visit of four years before. Upon his arrival in Léopoldville, he was pelted with rocks by black Belgo-Congolese citizens who were angry with the imprisonment of Patrice Lumumba, convicted of incitement against the colonial government. Though Baudouin's reception in other cities was considerably better, the shouts of "Vive le roi!" were often followed by "Indépendance immédiate!"

The Belgian government wanted to avoid being drawn into a futile and potentially very bloody colonial war, as had happened to France in Indochina and Algeria, or to the Netherlands in Indonesia. For that reason, it was inclined to give in to the demands for immediate independence voiced by the Congolese leaders. Despite lack of preparation and an insufficient number of educated elite (mainly in the fields of economics, law and military science), the Belgian leaders hoped that things might work out. This became known as "Le Pari Congolais"—the Congolese bet.

In January 1960, Congolese political leaders were invited to Brussels to participate in the Belgo-Congolese Round Table Conference to discuss independence. Patrice Lumumba was discharged from prison and joined the negotiations in Brussels. In response to the strong united front put up by the Congolese delegation, the conference agreed to grant the Congolese practically all of their demands: a general election to be held in May 1960 and full independence—"Dipenda"—on 30 June 1960.
