= Jef Van Bilsen =

Belgian professor

Anton Arnold Jozef "Jef" Van Bilsen (13 June 1913, in Diest – 22 July 1996, in Kraainem), usually cited as A. A. J. Van Bilsen in his academic publications, was a Belgian professor who, in December 1955, proposed a 30-year scheme (known as the "Van Bilsen Plan") for creating a self-sufficient independent state out of the Belgian Congo.

Before World War II, Van Bilsen was an active member of the extreme-right Verdinaso party and, in 1942, became a member of the Belgian Resistance. After the war, he travelled in colonial Africa.

Van Bilsen is best known for devising a plan for the long-term independence of the Belgian Congo in the 1950s. The timetable, outlined in December 1955 and in a pamphlet entitled Un Plan de Trente Ans pour l'émancipation politique de l'Afrique Belge (1955–56), called for a gradual change over 30 years, the time he estimated it would take to create an educated elite to administrate the new Congo. His plan never came to fruition after Congolese nationalists demanded immediate independence, especially after the Léopoldville Riots of 1959, leading to a period of prolonged political chaos, known as the Congo Crisis, and the eventual seizure of power by Joseph-Désiré Mobutu in 1965.

Van Bilsen taught at the Catholic University of Leuven and Ghent University.

== Bibliography ==
- Vers l'indépendance du Congo et du Ruanda-Urundi (1958)
- Kongo 1945–1965: Het Einde van een Kolonie (1993)

== Bibliography ==
- Reyntjens, F. (2015). "Van Bilsen (Anton Arnold Jozef)". Biographie Belge d'Outre-mer. Vol. ix. Brussels.
- Lieven Saerens. Inventaris van het Archief Anton A. Jozef (Jef) Van Bilsen (1913–1996). KADOC Reeks Inventarissen en Repertoria nr. 59, Leuven, 2002.
- Beke, Dirk (2000). "Jef Van Bilsen, de onafhankelijkheid van Congo en de Visie op Lumumba". Afrika Focus. 16 (1–2). doi:10.21825/af.v16i1-2.5433.
- Lein, Brecht (2012). "Jef Van Bilsen en het einde van het Verdinaso". WT: Tijdschrift over de geschiedenis van de Vlaamse beweging. 71 (1): 34–56. doi:10.21825/wt.v71i1.12273.
- Lein, Brecht (2012). "Jef Van Bilsen tussen Hendrik De Man en Tony Herbert. De politieke zoektocht van een ex-Dinaso". WT: Tijdschrift over de geschiedenis van de Vlaamse beweging. 71 (2): 105–140. doi:10.21825/wt.v71i2.12260.
