= Association du Personnel Indigene de la Colonie =

The Association du Personnel Indigene de la Colonie (APIC) (Association of Native Personnel of the Colony), later the Alliance des Patriotes Indépendants du Congo, was a Congolese labour union.

== History ==
APIC was created in 1946 following the passing of legislation allowing its organisation by colonial authorities after growing demands from labouring Congolese during World War II. Heavy colonial restrictions on labour organising and political activity were in place until 1957. As a result, APIC's influence was weak outside of Léopoldville.

In 1959, APIC began lobbying for hiring of Africans in supervisory roles in the colonial administration.

Following the determination of a date for independence, APIC began advocating for the full Africanisation of the administration. It also pushed for the Africanisation of the police and army. In preparing for the granting of sovereignty, the colonial administration began to craft a series of exams for Congolese civil servants to pass to be considered for promotion, but the project was abandoned due to intense opposition form APIC. APIC did not openly involve itself in the Congolese elections but successfully pushed for Lumumba and the MNC to embrace some of its hardline stances on Africanisation.

Multiple APIC leaders assumed ministerial roles in Lumumba's government, in his ministers' cabinets, and in provincial governments.

In April 1961, APIC joined with two other labour unions in forming a federation, the Confédération des Syndicats Libres du Congo.

== Works cited ==
- Mbili, Mbili Kwa (June 1986). "Esquisse du syndicalisme au Zaïre : d'hier à aujourd'hui". Africa: Rivista trimestrale di studi e documentazione dell'Istituto italiano per l'Africa e l'Oriente (in French). 41 (2): 271–280. JSTOR 40759962.
- MacGaffey, Wyatt, ed. (1962). Area Handbook for the Republic of the Congo (Leopoldville). Washington D.C.: American University Foreign Areas Studies Division. OCLC 1347356.
- Vanderstraeten, Louis-François (1985). De la Force publique à l'Armée nationale congolaise: histoire d'une mutinerie, juillet 1960 [From the Public Force to the Congolese National Army: story of a mutiny, July 1960] (PDF) (in French) (reprint ed.). Brussels: Académie Royale de Belgique.
- Young, M. Crawford (1965). Politics in the Congo: Decolonization and Independence. Princeton: Princeton University Press. OCLC 307971.
