= Decolonization of public space =

Worldwide phenomenon of colonialist symbol removal

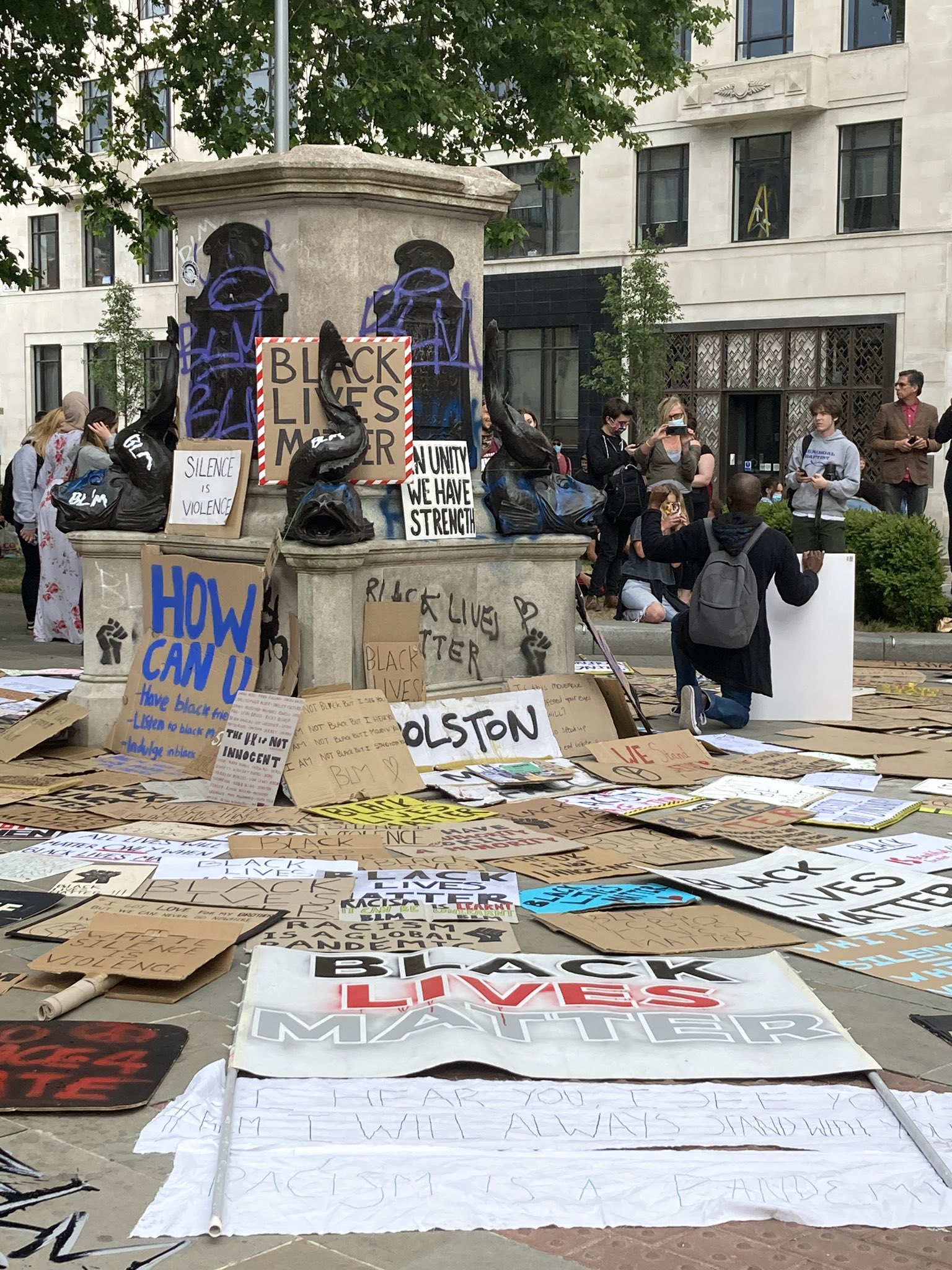
The empty pedestal of the statue of Edward Colston in Bristol, the day after protesters felled the statue and rolled it into the harbour in 2020.

The decolonization of public space is a social movement that appeared at the end of the 20th century and the beginning of the 21st century in several nations around the world, in the face of the persistence of colonialist symbols such as place names and statues. The movement and its actions emanate from anti-racist and anti-colonial associations, or from descendants of communities that suffered from European colonization (e.g. Māori community in New Zealand, Native American and African-American communities in the United States, and the Congolese diaspora in Belgium). It is the most publicized example of de-commemoration.

This process began in the former colonies after they gained independence in the second half of the 20th century. From there, it then spread to the Western world at the beginning of the 21st century. This demand reached its peak among the Māori in New Zealand in the 2010s. It did not reach its peak in North America, in Belgium, or the United Kingdom until 2020 in the wake of the demonstrations against racism and police brutality following the murder of George Floyd, who was killed by the police on May 25, 2020, in Minneapolis, Minnesota, United States.

== History of the movement ==
The questioning of the public markers of European colonial history began in the 1960s, during the independence of many formerly colonized regions. Initially occurring in the former colonies, this movement would spread to Europe itself as a result of the advancement and spread of postcolonial studies.

This protest gained particular import in 2020, when the emotion aroused by the murder of George Floyd in the United States spread in the Western world, relaunching the Black Lives Matter movement. As a result, there were then many militant depredations, destructions, and removals of statues that activists expressed a desire to de-commemorate, such as those of Christopher Columbus in the United States (contested by the Native Americans), of the explorer James Cook, and of the British naval commander John Hamilton in New Zealand (contested by the Māori people), of the Confederate President Jefferson Davis, of the slave traders Edward Colston and Robert Milligan in Bristol, England, of Queen Victoria, of the former British Prime Minister Winston Churchill (whose remarks on racial issues sparked controversy) and of Robert Baden-Powell, founder of world-wide Scout Movement, after being accused of racism, homophobia, and links with the Nazi regime.

== Modes and fields of action ==
=== Modes of action ===
The decolonization of public space can be achieved through spontaneous removals, during popular demonstrations (such as with the statue of Edward Colston in Bristol), or through long negotiations or awareness campaigns (as with the statue of Hamilton in New Zealand). Similarly, intermediate solutions can be found such as the installation of explanatory plaques (streets named after slave traders in Bordeaux).

Some activists cover monuments and statues with militant inscriptions or spray them with red paint, a symbol representing blood. The activists of this movement, who refute the term "vandalism", consider their actions as a form of strongly symbolic street art.

=== Fields of action ===
In the public space, colonialist references and the memory of atrocities are made up of very diverse elements. These may be statues or monuments, names of public roads (odonyms) or places (toponyms), national symbols (anthems, flags, currencies), cultural elements (names of works of art, gastronomic specialties, carnivals, etc.) or even commercial signs (Café du négro in Bayonne, Pharmacie de la Négresse in Biarritz, and Au Nègre joyeux in Paris).

== In Africa ==
=== South Africa ===
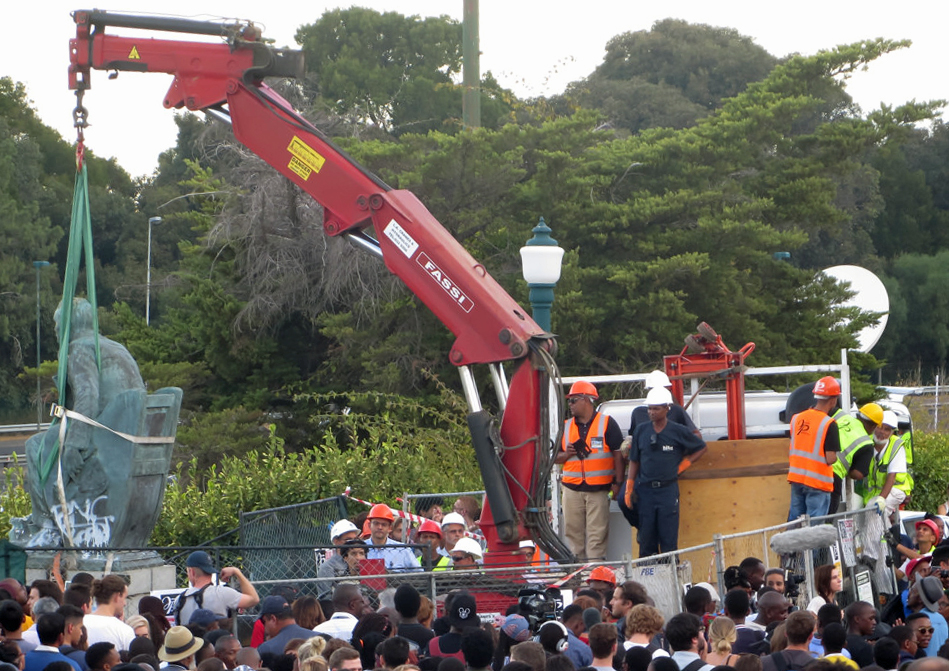
Statue of Cecil John Rhodes being removed from the University Of Cape Town on 9 April 2015 following the Rhodes Must Fall movement.

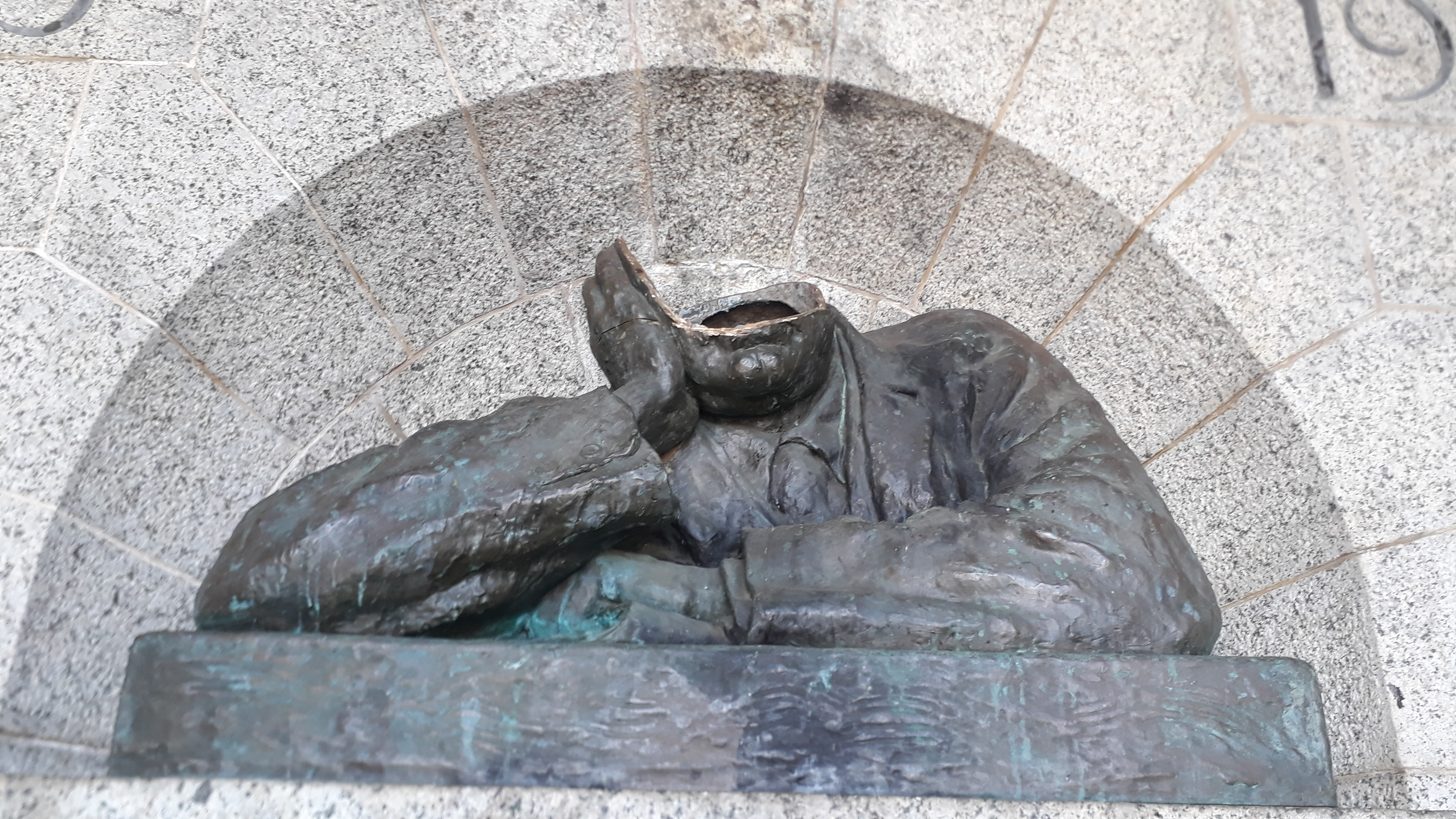
The bust of Cecil Rhodes at Rhodes Memorial in Cape Town, South Africa after being decapitated by a grinder.

Within the University of Cape Town in South Africa, the Rhodes Must Fall movement broke out in 2015. This collective, composed of students and staff members, demanded and obtained the removal of a statue of Cecil Rhodes that stood at the entrance to the campus. Erected in 1934 in gratitude for the land he left to the university, the monument paid tribute to Cecil John Rhodes, former prime minister of the Cape Colony, white supremacist, and symbol of British imperialism at the end of the 19th century. Subjects of discontent were invoked by the collective, such as the under-representation of non-whites within the management and teaching staff, and the supposed persistence of institutional racism, notably via the numbers of registration or tuition fees, or the housing conditions of non-white students.

Although unorganized, the Rhodes Must Fall movement spread throughout the country. Julius Malema, founder of the Economic Freedom Fighters, called for the destruction of all monuments related to the history of white South Africa. Other statues symbolizing white domination were vandalized over several weeks, including the Statue of Queen Victoria in Port Elizabeth, the equestrian statue of Louis Botha and the Rhodes Memorial in Cape Town, the statue of King George V at the University of Durban, the statue of Johannes Strijdom in Krugersdorp, several statues of Paul Kruger (one located in Pretoria, another in Rustenburg, and the third in Krugersdorp), as well as various monuments commemorating the Second Boer War such as the Uitenhage War Memorial and the Horse Memorial in Port Elizabeth. At the University of the Free State, it was against a backdrop of violent racial and social tensions that the statue of Charles Swart, president during the apartheid era, was set on fire, toppled, and thrown into a pond. The protests were rekindled in July 2020, following the murder of George Floyd in the United States. Colonialist monuments were once again targeted in the country. The bust of Cecil Rhodes, located in his memorial in Cape Town, was then decapitated with a grinder.

=== Democratic Republic of Congo ===
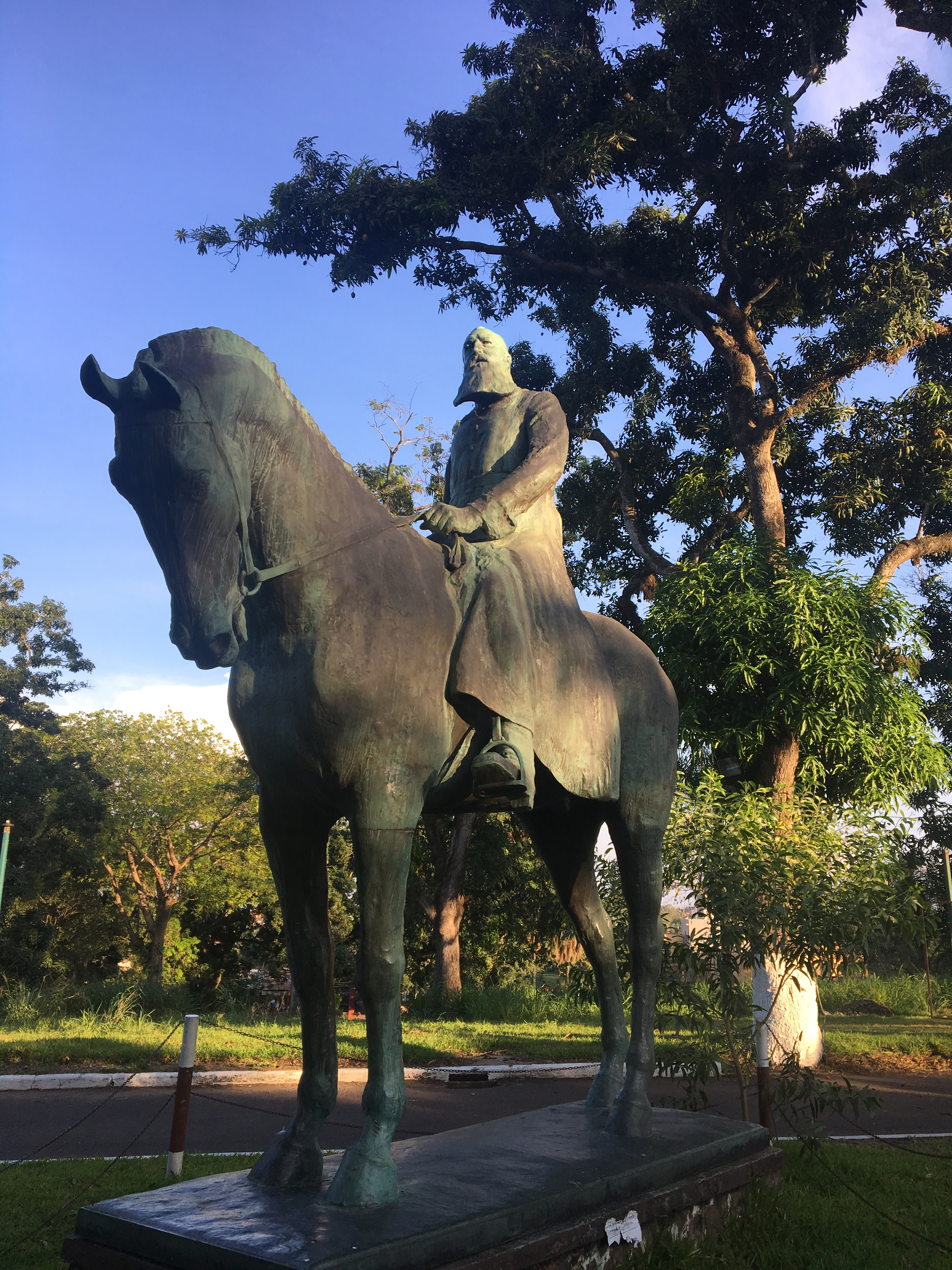
Equestrian statue of Leopold II in Kinshasa, 2018

A statue of Leopold II, inaugurated in 1928 by Albert I, was installed in Kinshana (named Leopoldville in his honor until 1966) in front of the Palais de la Nation, the current presidential building.

The monument was torn down in 1967 on the orders of Zairean President Mobutu Sese Seko, at the height of his policy of a "return to African authenticity", and then forgotten for nearly 40 years.

In 2005, Congolese Minister of Culture Christophe Muzungu decided to put the statue back in place, arguing that colonial history should not be forgotten "so that this does not happen again". Initially re-installed near Kinshasa's main train station, it was removed less than a day later.

The statue finally joined the heights of the park of the National Museum of Kinshasa. Rehabilitated in 2010 with the help of the United Nations Mission in Congo (MONUSCO), it is accompanied by the statue of his successor Albert I, of founder of Leopoldville Henry Morton Stanley, as well as a sculpture in memory of the Congolese soldiers of the colonial army. According to the historian Isidore Ndaywel, "The idea was to make an open-air museum".

=== Zambia ===
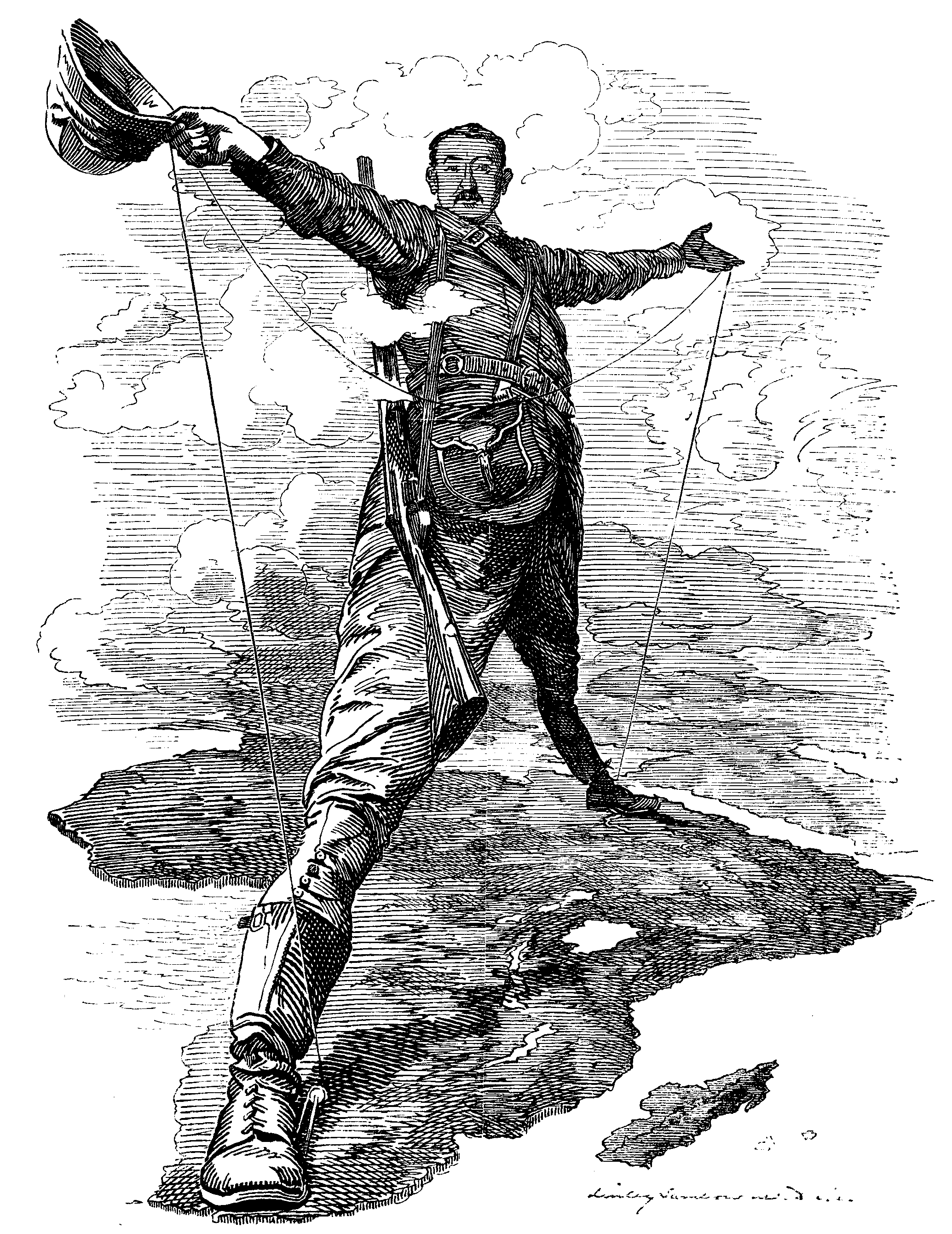
British Africa "From Cairo to the Cape" according to Cecil Rhodes.

The term "Rhodesia" refers to the possessions of the British South Africa Company (BSAC) in Southern Africa within the Limpopo-Zambezi basin region (present-day Zambia and Zimbabwe). This toponym was made official by the BSAC in May 1895, and by the United Kingdom in 1898. It pays tribute to Cecil Rhodes, British businessman, Prime Minister of the Cape Colony, and the founder and administrator of the BSAC. In 1911, the colonies of North-Western Rhodesia and North-Eastern Rhodesia merged to become Northern Rhodesia (today Zambia), administered under royal charter by the British South Africa Company until 1924, then as a protectorate by the government of the United Kingdom.

In 1953, the British founded the Federation of Rhodesia and Nyasaland, grouping together three of their colonies: Nyasaland (today Malawi), Northern Rhodesia, and Southern Rhodesia (today Zimbabwe). This colonial experiment, which aimed to create a multi-racial society where political collaboration between the races would reign, had the objective of taking back control of the territory by London in the face of the rise of the Afrikaners from the Union of South Africa, the economic development of this region of southern Africa, and was to delay the desires of independence among the African population. The establishment of the federation granted certain political rights to blacks, but the white minority continued to dominate political life. The arrangement met with opposition from the majority of the inhabitants, both the small white settlers and the African leaders who were violently hostile to it.

The election of a segregationist party in Southern Rhodesia led to the breakup of the Federation of Rhodesia-Nyasaland, which was dissolved on 31 December 1963. Southern Rhodesia remained in the hands of white settlers, and became the only "Rhodesia". Nyasaland declared its independence and took the name Malawi. Finally, Northern Rhodesia, which also gained independence, abandoned its reference to Cecil Rhodes as a symbol of British imperialism at the end of the 19th century, and became Zambia in 1964.

=== Zimbabwe ===
==== Country name ====
When Zimbabwe gained independence in April 1980, its new authorities led a major campaign to decolonize its public space, both in its monuments and in its toponymy. This began in particular with the change of the country's name. Formerly called Southern Rhodesia in reference to the British colonizer and businessman Cecil Rhodes, the country was renamed Zimbabwe ("stone house" in the Shona language).

==== Monuments toppled ====
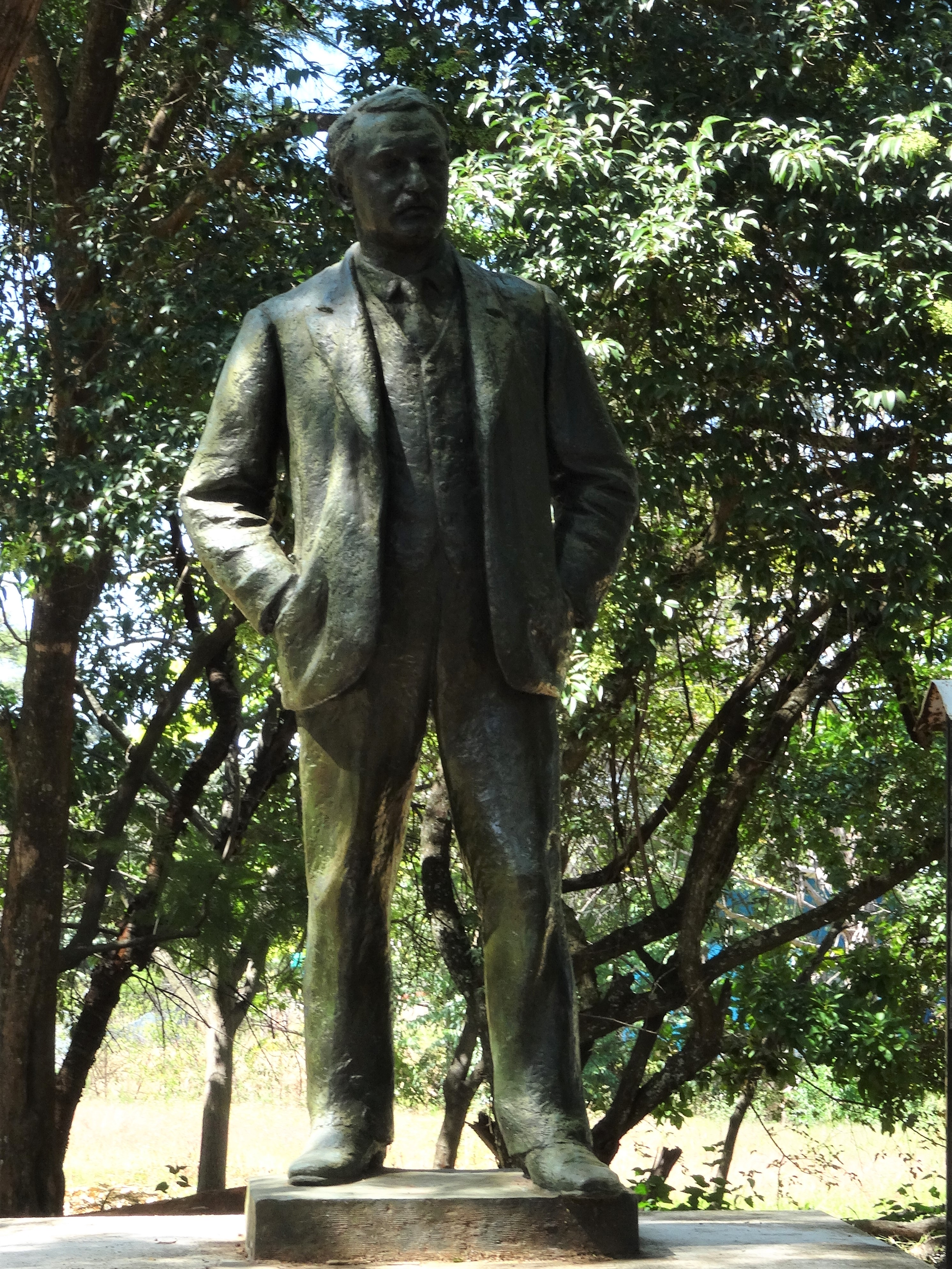
Statue of Cecil Rhodes, formerly located on Jameson Avenue, removed in 1980 and now located in the National Archives Garden.

In May 1980, the portrait of Cecil Rhodes was removed from the reception room of the Government House and sent to the National Gallery in Salisbury (renamed Harare two years later). In July, his statue, erected in 1928 on Jameson Avenue, was removed by the government a few hours before the official visit of Mozambican President Samora Machel to carry out ceremonies for the inauguration of the avenue bearing his name (formerly Jameson Avenue). The statue has since been on display on the grounds of the National Archives of Zimbabwe. This was followed in 1981 by another statue of Rhodes, then located on Main Street in Bulawayo which was relocated to Centenary Park, near the city's National Museum.

==== Famous places ====
The capital Salisbury, named after the British Prime Minister Lord Cecil, 3rd Marquess of Salisbury, was renamed after its main township, Harare, on the second anniversary of independence in April 1982, thus paying tribute to the Harawa tribal leader (the township was then renamed Mbare).

In 1984, Rhodes-Matopos National Park, where Cecil Rhodes' grave is located, was renamed Matobo National Park. Similarly, Rhodes' Rhodes-Inyanga National Park in eastern Mashonaland was renamed Nyanga National Park in the early 1980s.

== In Americas ==
=== Race Day ===
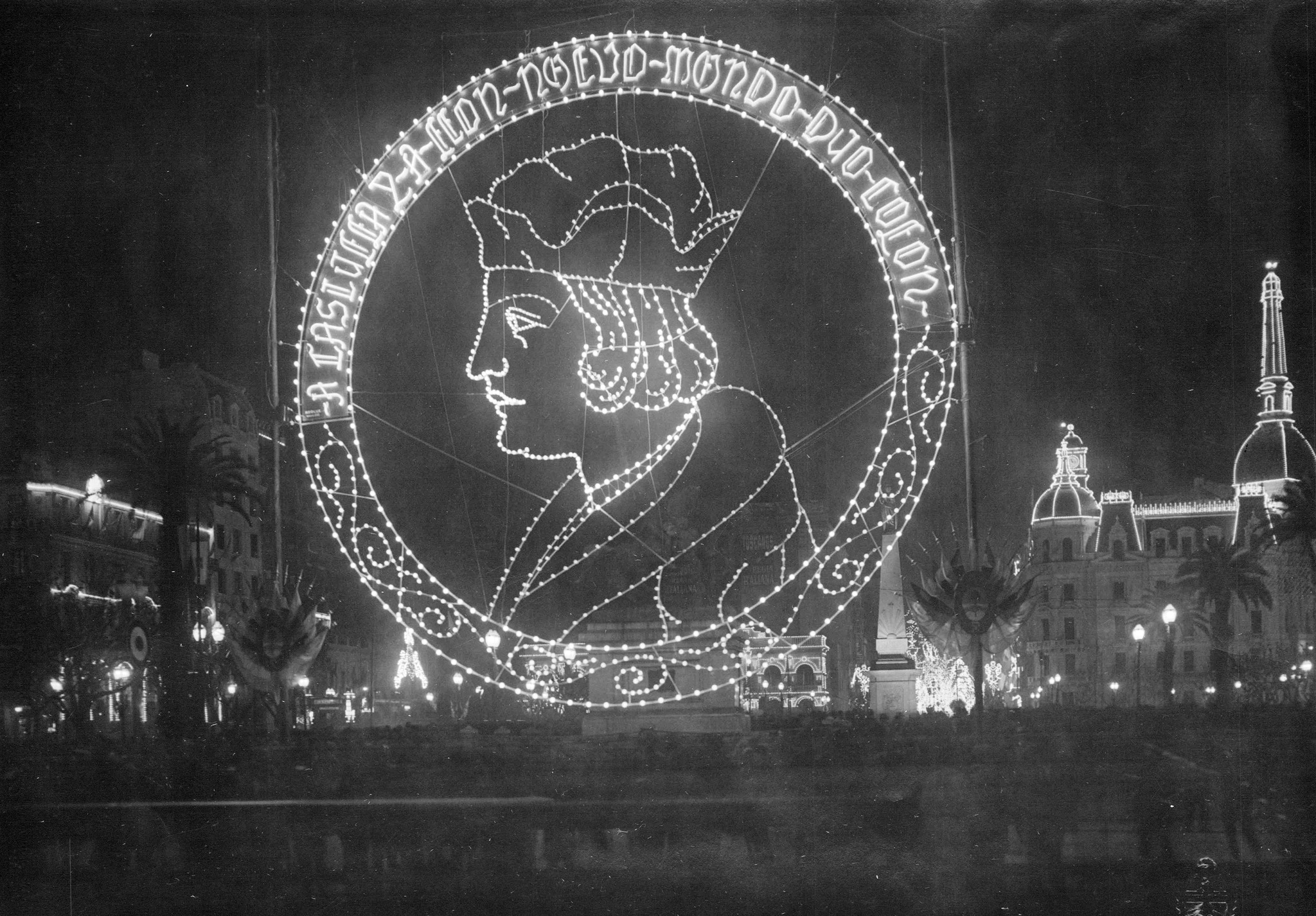
Celebration of Race Day, October 12, 1929, in Buenos Aires.

In countries with Spanish culture or language, October 12 is an official date of commemoration of the landing of Christopher Columbus in the Bahamas in 1492, marking the beginning of the European colonization of the Americas. Its name of "Day of the Race" or "Race Day" since 1917, referring to the Ibero-American "race". The homage paid to Christopher Columbus during the holiday, increasingly perceived as one of the figures of the genocide of the Native Americans, provoked reluctance around this commemorative date. A large number of countries have renamed this holiday: "National Day of Spain" (Spain), "Day of the Pluricultural Nation" (Mexico), "Day of American Cultural Diversity" (Argentina), "Day of the Discovery of the Two Worlds" (Chile), and "Day of the Indigenous Resistance" (Venezuela).

=== Argentina ===
In 1921, the significant Argentine-Italian community offered Buenos Aires a monument to Christopher Columbus on the occasion of the centenary of the May Revolution of 1810. Made by Arnaldo Zocchi, the statue is made of a piece of Carrara marble six meters high and weighing 24 tons. It was left in very poor condition at the beginning of the 21st century, and presents structural deteriorations caused by the impacts of bullets of the Navy during the anti-Peronist bombings of June 1955, and by the blast of a bomb in April 1987: "His beret is split, separated from the head, and there is a crack around both arms", the specialists specify.

In March 2013, the Bolivian government of Evo Morales approved the donation of just over a million dollars to Argentina to erect a statue of the Bolivian Juana Azurduy de Padilla, a heroine of the Latin American wars of independence who fought alongside the Argentines, in Buenos Aires. Following this, Argentine President Cristina Fernández de Kirchner then announced the removal of the statue of Columbus, which had stood on a pedestal in the Parque Colón near the Casa Rosada, to replace it with the statue of Juana Azurduy de Padilla.

The Italians of Mar del Plata, who constitute the largest Italian community in the country, then requested that the monument to Christopher Columbus be moved to the Plaza Colón in Mar del Plata, opposite to the casino. However, on April 5, 2013, the civil association "Basta de Demoler" presented an injunction to prevent the transfer of the monument to Mar del Plata and, on April 23, 2013, Italian community organizations demonstrated in the Plaza Colón in Buenos Aires against the transfer project.

A double legal battle ensued, opposing, on the one hand, Italian associations to the authorities and, on the other, the city to the State: an agreement was finally signed in 2014 between the City and the State and ratified by Parliament, which also determined the sea wall located in front of the Jorge Newbery airport as the new site for the statue.

In 2016, the monument to Christopher Columbus was replaced by the monument to Juana Azurduy, to the great displeasure of Italian community organizations who went so far as to send a letter to the Italian Prime Minister Matteo Renzi explaining the situation and asking him to intercede with the Argentine President Mauricio Macri. The lawyer of these associations denounced the lamentable state of the monument: "It is on the sea wall of Puerto Argentino, in front of the airport, broken into pieces. There has been damage to the pieces, they have not been properly maintained, there are broken pieces".

Finally, in November 2017, the reassembly of the monument to Christopher Columbus on the Costanera Norte was completed.

=== Bolivia ===
On October 12, 2020, during a rally in the center of the Bolivian capital La Paz, activists placed a traditional Andean skirt on the statue of Isabella the Catholic (1451–1504), Queen of Castile and Aragon, who had financed Christopher Columbus's expeditions, to re-dress the statue as a cholita. The protesters intended to say "that colonization was a genocide, that America did not have to be discovered, that America already had formed societies."

In August 2021, indigenous groups commemorating the Day of Indigenous Rurality tried to unbolt the statue of Christopher Columbus in the center of La Paz, but they only managed to break his nose and paint his face black. The mayor of La Paz decided to prosecute the leader of the group, who was part of the Aymara community, but the young man warned: "I challenge Mayor Ivan Arias to put me in jail! History repeats itself, they will always try to show their supposed power. But what they don't know is that we are rebelling again, this is a warning".

=== Brazil ===
In 2020, while antiracist protesters in Bristol were tearing down and sinking away the statue of Edward Colston, that of Portuguese slave trader Joaquim Pereira Marinho (1782–1854?) still stood in the center of Salvador city, through whose harbor arrived almost a third of the Africans brought to Brazil. Historian Carlos da Silva Jr. pointed out that Pereira Marinho entered the slave trade after it was banned in Brazil in 1831 by the Feijó Law. The slave trader is estimated to have shipped about 11,000 slaves, at least 10% of whom died during the voyages. Later, in 1858, he created the African Union Company to carry out legal trade with Africa, an activity he managed to maintain thanks to his contacts in Cuba, where slave trade was still lawful.

Historian Moreno Pacheco told the BBC that "here [in Brazil] we don't even have awareness of the monuments dedicated in our cities to figures from the past who had links to the oppression of black and indigenous people or to political emancipation movements. From time to time, such debate is held among colleagues, especially when discussion explodes in other countries like the United States in 2017 and now the UK."

That reality started to change when, in July 2021, a group called Revolução Periférica (Note: (roughly "Favela Revolution", periferia 'periphery' being a metonym for Brazilian slums)) set fire to a statue of bandeirante Manuel de Borba Gato (1649–1718) located in São Paulo. According to historian and political scientist Boris Fausto, the bandeiras (lit. 'flags') were expeditions headed to the innerlands of Brazil in search of indigenous people to capture and sell into slavery, who would often also be tortured, raped and even murdered. Most of the bandeirantes – the white men who led the bandeiras – were from São Paulo state, where many streets, avenues, monuments and squares are named after prominent bandeirantes such as Manuel de Borba Gato, Antônio Raposo Tavares, and Domingos Jorge Velho.

In 2022, for Rio's carnival, the Beija-Flor samba school paraded at the ending of the procession with a float whereupon stood bronze-colored statues of three "invaders, slave traders and racism spreaders" which were then symbolically toppled: Admiral Pedro Álvares Cabral (who kickstarted Portuguese colonization of Brazil), writer Monteiro Lobato (due to his racist views), and bandeirante leader Borba Gato (who was symbolically placed higher than the others).

=== Chile ===
In Chile, the Mapuche, who constitute the largest indigenous population in the country and represent 10% of the national population, have many grievances against the state and government due to deforestation, pollution, inequalities in land ownership, and their limited political representation. One of their main goals is for Chile to become a "plurinational state" like neighboring Bolivia, granting indigenous peoples greater political autonomy, as well as official status for their languages. These demands are shared by smaller aboriginal groups such as the Diaguita, a people of the Andean desert.

In March 2017, the bust of Chilean general Cornelio Saavedra Rodríguez, known for leading the bloody "pacification" of the heart of the Mapuche country in the 19th century, was destroyed by unknown persons and later replaced.

On October 20, 2019, at La Serena in the north of the country, protesters tore down and burned a statue of the conquistador Francisco de Aguirre, who was accused of being a rapist of indigenous women and committing genocide against the indigenous peoples who inhabited the Coquimbo and Atacama regions, and replaced it with a statue of "Milanka", a woman who represents the Diaguita people. On October 31, unknown persons destroyed the statue of Milanka, which had been made of cardboard and papier-mâché by students from the La Nuez school and installed after a ceremony by the Diaguita community, in homage to the women who maintained the customs, traditions and languages of the indigenous peoples.

On October 29, 2019, in the center of Temuco in the Araucanía Region, a group of Mapuche militants overthrew the bust of the Spanish conquistador Pedro de Valdivia (1497–1553), lieutenant of Pizarro in the war of conquest and extermination in Peru, and governor of Chile from 1541 to 1547. Not far away, another group demolished the statue of the politician Diego Portales (1793–1837) and hung a Mapuche flag in the hand of the statue of the naval officer Arturo Prat Chacón (1848–1879).

On the same day, in the city of Concepción, which Pedro de Valdivia founded in 1550, demonstrators tore down his bust, grilled it, and impaled it at the foot of the statue of his historic enemy, the Mapuche leader Lautaro.

Also on October 29, 2019, in Temuco, the statue of the aviator Dagoberto Godoy (1893–1960) was decapitated and his head was hung from the statue of the Mapuche leader Caupolicán.

On the night of October 29–30, 2019, in the town of Collipulli, the bronze bust of General Cornelio Saavedra Rodríguez, founder of the town, was overthrown using ropes.

In August 2020, protesters tore down the statue of General Cornelio Saavedra Rodríguez (1759–1829) in the municipality of Lumaco in the Araucanía Region, as part of protests against the repression and persecution of the Mapuche ethnic group by the Chilean state. According to Radio Habana Cuba, Saavedra is considered one of the greatest military genocidaires during the occupation of Mapuche territories by the army, the oligarchy, and the political class in the 19th century.

On March 5, 2021, in Santiago, Chile, a group of protesters attempted to set fire to the statue of Chilean General Manuel Baquedano (1823–1897). Three days later, the protesters attempted to unbolt the statue and, on March 12, 2021, the statue was removed from its pedestal by the authorities to the sound of trumpets played by a row of soldiers. The statue of General Baquedano, a hero of the War of the Pacific that pitted Chile against Peru and Bolivia at the end of the 19th century, was not a specific target of the protesters but, since October 2019, had become the object of a symbolic quarrel between the protesters and the authorities for control of the square, the epicenter of the demonstrations during the social crisis in Chile. Conservative President Sebastián Piñera assured that the monument, erected in 1928, would be restored and reinstalled quickly "because we want to show our gratitude and respect to our heroes".

=== Colombia ===
On September 16, 2020, in Popayán in southwestern Colombia, the equestrian statue of the Spanish conquistador Sebastián de Belalcázar, erected in 1937, was pulled down with ropes by a group of several dozen Colombian Amerindians following a call for mobilization by the indigenous Misak, Nasa, and Pijao peoples, in order to protest against the "cultural and physical extermination of the indigenous peoples" of the department of Cauca. For the Misak people, the conquistador "was one of the main peoples responsible for the servitude and extermination of indigenous peoples and African slaves in the region".

On May 7, 2021, in the capital Bogotá, protesters from the Misak community, originally from the southwest of the country, overthrew the statue erected in 1960 of the Spanish conquistador Gonzalo Jiménez de Quesada, founder of Bogota: "Historically, he was the greatest murderer, torturer, thief and rapist of our women and children" declared the group in a statement.

On June 11, 2021, Colombian authorities moved the bronze statues of Christopher Columbus and Spanish Queen Isabella the Catholic that stood in the center of the capital Bogota, after two days of standoff with protesters from the indigenous Misak people who planned to topple them.

=== Mexico ===
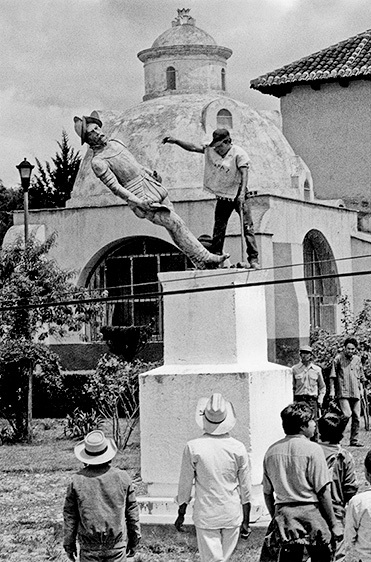
Toppled of the statue of conquistador Diego de Mazariegos on October 12, 1992 in San Cristóbal de las Casas

On October 10, 2020, the statue of Christopher Columbus, erected on the Paseo de la Reforma, the main artery of the center of Mexico City, was removed from its pedestal by the authorities in order to submit the monument "to an examination and possible restoration". However, on September 5, 2021, the mayor of the Mexican capital Claudia Sheinbaum declared that the statue of the Genoese navigator would be stored in the Park of the Americas, in a room of the city hall of Miguel Hidalgo, one of the sixteen territorial divisions of Mexico City.

=== Venezuela ===
In 2020, during the celebration of the 528th anniversary of the "Indigenous Resistance" (formerly "Race Day") commemorating the beginning of the Spanish colonization of America, Venezuelan President Nicolas Maduro declared that he was initiating a process of decolonization: "I have decided (...) to initiate in a progressive, gradual, organized and disciplined manner a process of decolonization and reconquest of all public spaces bearing the name of the colonizers, conquerors and genocidaires". On this occasion, he announced that the Francisco Fajardo highway, whose name pays homage to conquistador Francisco Fajardo, would now bear the name of "Grand Cacique Guaicaipuro", named after an Indigenous resistance fighter against colonization.

=== Canada ===
==== Statues of Queen Victoria ====
On the night of March 15, 2018, two statues of Queen Victoria located in downtown Montreal— the first at Victoria Square and the second in front of McGill University on Sherbrooke Street— were sprayed with green paint by activists who considered them "racist" since the Queen's monuments symbolized the legacy of the British Empire for them. These actions were claimed by the Delhi-Dublin Anti-Colonial Solidarity Brigade. The same group vandalized the statue at McGill University again in 2021.

==== Statue of John A. Macdonald ====
On August 29, 2020, protesters tore down the statue of Canada's first Prime Minister, John A. Macdonald, at Place du Canada in Montreal, with the statue's head coming off as it fell. The statue of John A. Macdonald had already been sprayed with red paint in November 2017.

The removal of the statue provoked mixed reactions, even dividing representatives of the indigenous populations. Thus, David Chartrand, vice-president of the Métis National Council, strongly condemned the activists who toppled the statue: "I do not support them in any way. I think it was absolutely the wrong approach. However, if anyone can say that they suffered because of John A. Macdonald, it is us." Similarly, Konrad Sioui, Grand Chief of the Huron-Wendat Nation, emphasized: "That is not our approach, that is not how we operate." On the other hand, Constant Awashish, Grand Chief of the Atikamekw Nation, notes that the incident has the merit of recalling that John A. Macdonald was a notorious oppressor, who adopted policies with disastrous effects for the First Nations, played an important role in the establishment of the residential school system for Aboriginal children and refused in 1885 to allow an appeal of the condemnation of the Métis leader Louis Riel to hanging.

The Quebec political sphere broadly deplored the action. Montreal Mayor Valérie Plante "firmly" deplored the unbolting. Quebec Premier François Legault called for the statue to be restored: "Whatever one may think of John A. MacDonald, destroying a monument in this way is unacceptable. We must fight racism, but destroying parts of our history is not the solution. Vandalism has no place in our democracy". Jean-François Lisée, former leader of the Parti Québécois, reacted by stating: "I am not a fan of John A. Macdonald (who was not a fan of Quebeckers). I could even be convinced that his statue should not have a place of honour. But it is not up to a group of protesters to decide whether his statue should be destroyed". The Canadian Conservatives went even further with their contempt. Erin O'Toole, leader of the Conservative Party of Canada, declared: "We will not build a better future by disfiguring our past. It is time for politicians to stop kowtowing to radical activists." Alberta Premier Jason Kenney declared: "If the City of Montreal decides not to restore the statue [...], we would be happy to receive it for installation on the grounds of the Alberta Legislative Assembly."

==== Statues of Queens Victoria and Elizabeth II in Winnipeg ====
During July 1, 2021 on Canada Day, Native American protesters tore down statues of Queen Victoria and Queen Elizabeth II in Winnipeg, near the Manitoba Legislature. The statues of the two queens, seen as symbols of the country's colonial history, were targeted amid tensions over the discovery of children's remains near residential schools in Canada in May and June 2021.

=== United States ===
==== Statues of Christopher Columbus ====
===== Beginnings from 2006 =====
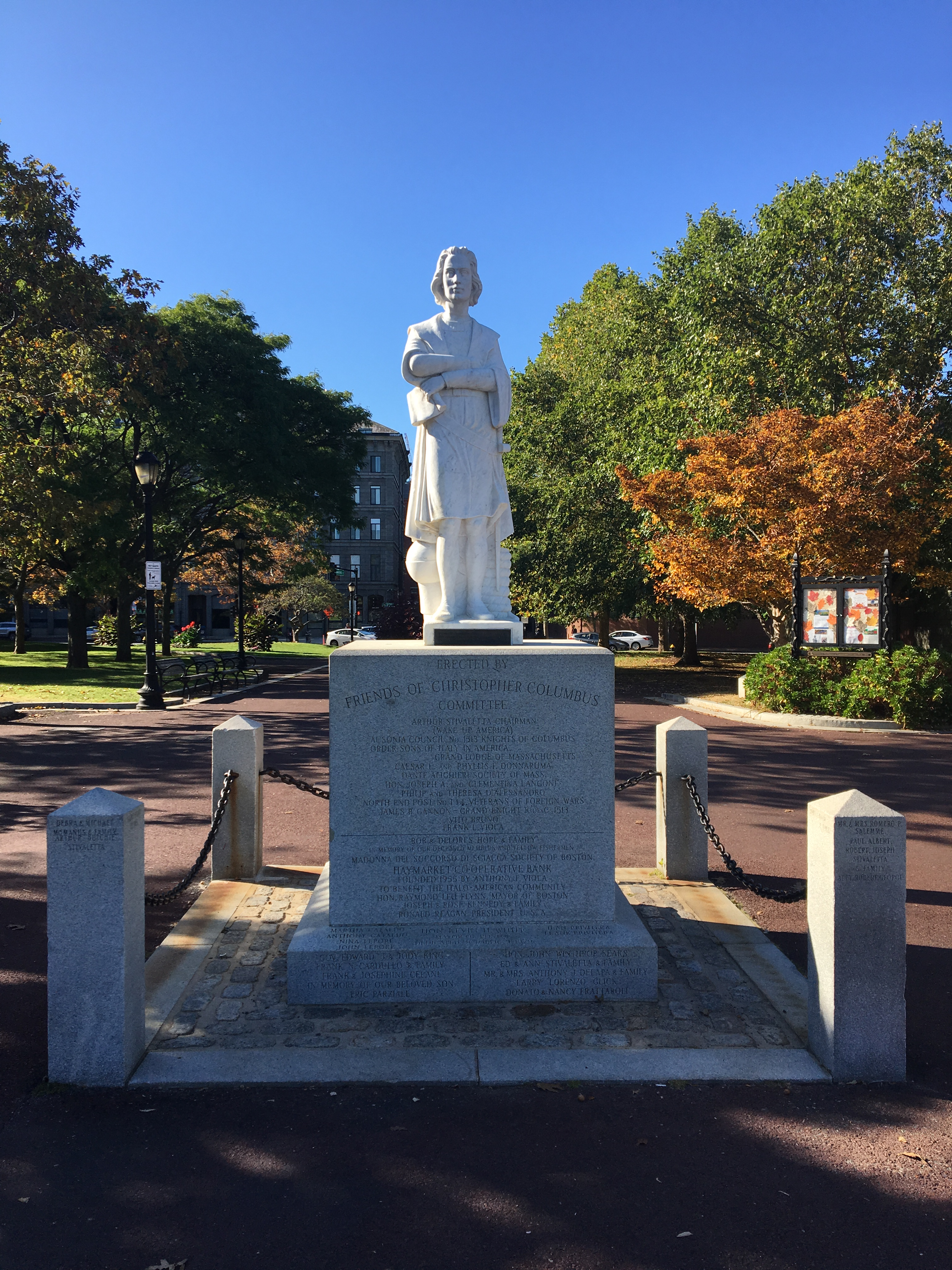
Statue of Christopher Columbus in Boston prior to its beheading in June 2020.

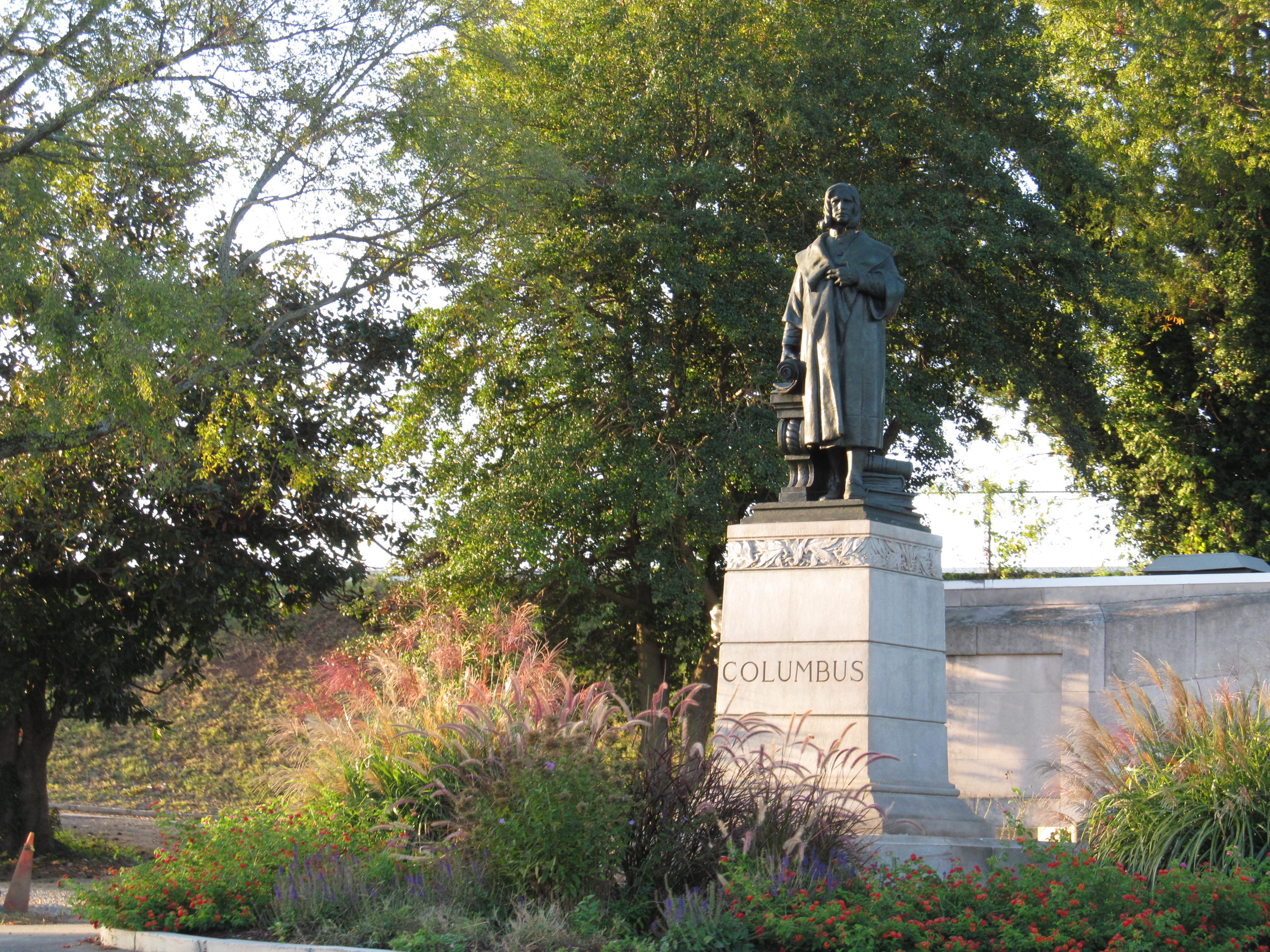
The statue of Christopher Columbus in Richmond, Virginia before its destruction in June 2020.

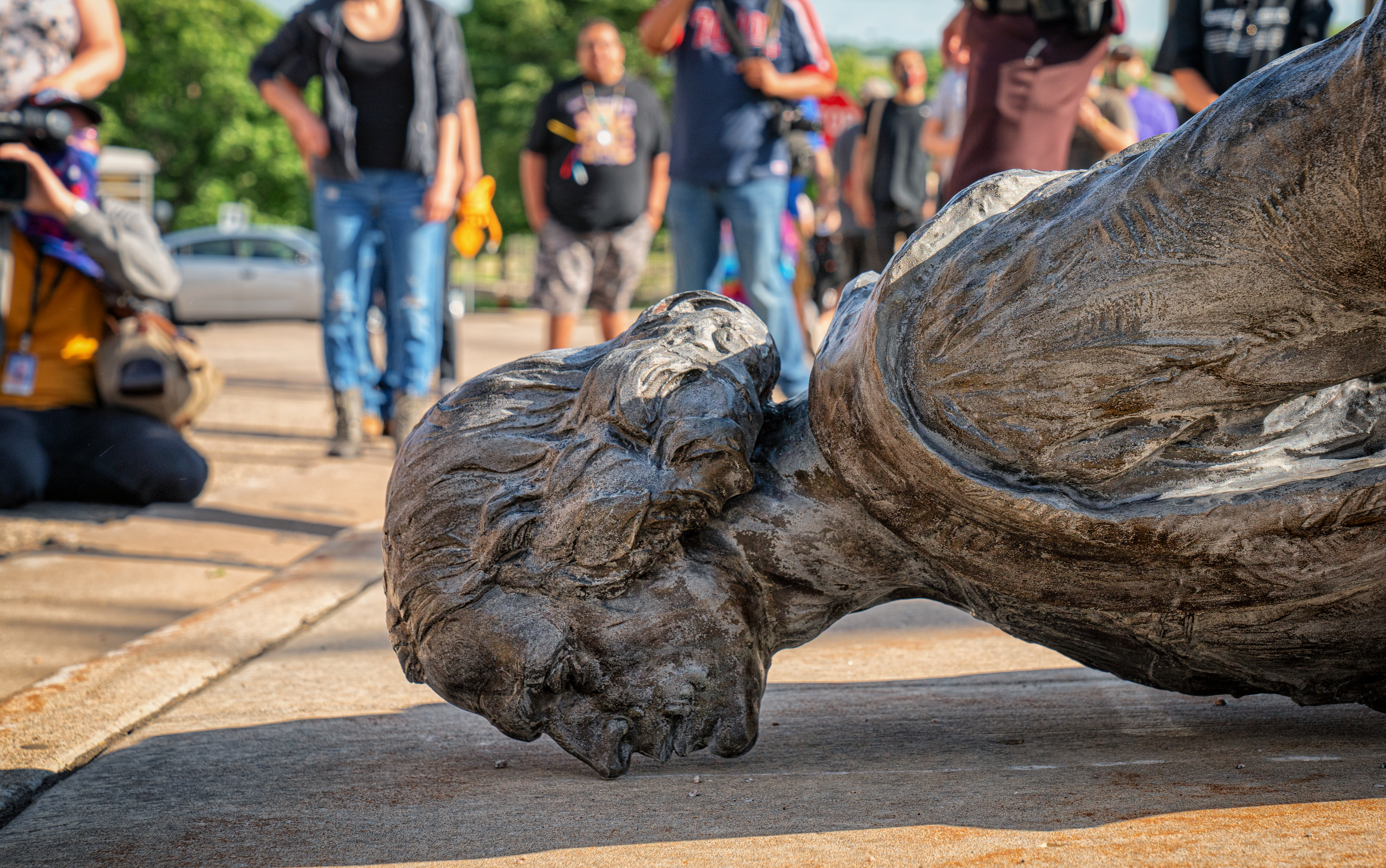
Christopher Columbus Statue torn down at Minnesota State Capitol in St. Paul, Minnesota on June 10, 2020.

Long presented as the "Discoverer of America" and as a symbol of the contribution of Italians to American history, Christopher Columbus is generally denounced in the 21st century as one of the figures of the genocide of the Native Americans because, during his four voyages to the Caribbean and the northern coast of South America, he enslaved and killed thousands of indigenous people. He has become a controversial figure in history for the way he treated the indigenous communities he encountered and for his role in the violent colonization at their expense. Native American activists oppose the idea of honoring Christopher Columbus, claiming that his expeditions to the Americas led to the colonization and genocide of their ancestors.

The statue of Christopher Columbus in Boston's Little Italy neighborhood was vandalized as early as 2006, when his head was missing for several days, and vandalized again in 2015 with red paint.

In the 2010s, many cities and states replaced Columbus Day with Indigenous Peoples Day, in recognition of the pain and terror caused by Columbus and other Europeans.

===== Peak in 2020 =====
In June 2020, the actions of Native American activists increased in the wake of the demonstrations against racism and police brutality following the murder of George Floyd by the police on May 25, 2020, in Minneapolis, Minnesota.

On June 9, 2020, the statue of Christopher Columbus located in Boston's Little Italy neighborhood was decapitated similarly to in 2006. After this action, the City of Boston removed the statue and the mayor announced "We will take the time to evaluate the historical significance of the statue".

On the same day, the Columbus statue in Richmond, Virginia was torn down, sprayed with paint, set on fire, and thrown into a lake. The Richmond Indigenous Society tweeted ahead of the rally that "We are gathering at Byrd Park to protest another racist monument. Christopher Columbus murdered Indigenous people and embedded the genocidal culture against Indigenous people that we still see today." "This continent is built on the blood and bones of our ancestors," said Vanessa Bolin, a member of the Richmond Indigenous Society.

The day after June 10, the statue of Columbus erected in front of the Minnesota State Capitol in St. Paul was thrown to the ground. Mike Forcia, an activist with the American Indian Movement, a civil rights movement for Native Americans in the United States who organized the rally, said he negotiated for years with the Capitol occupiers and received the same response over and over again: "You have to wait; there is a process that you have to follow." But Forcia stated that, "the time for complacency is over" and "the paradigm shift is underway."

That same evening, Minnesota Governor Tim Walz said he used to teach his students that many Minnesotans saw the Columbus statue as a "legacy of genocide," and added that it was time to "take a hard look at the outdated symbols and injustices around us." But he stressed that "removing the statue was wrong because the protesters could have gone through the proper process," before concluding, "Even in pain, we must work together to make changes, legally."

==== Statue of Thomas Jefferson in New York ====
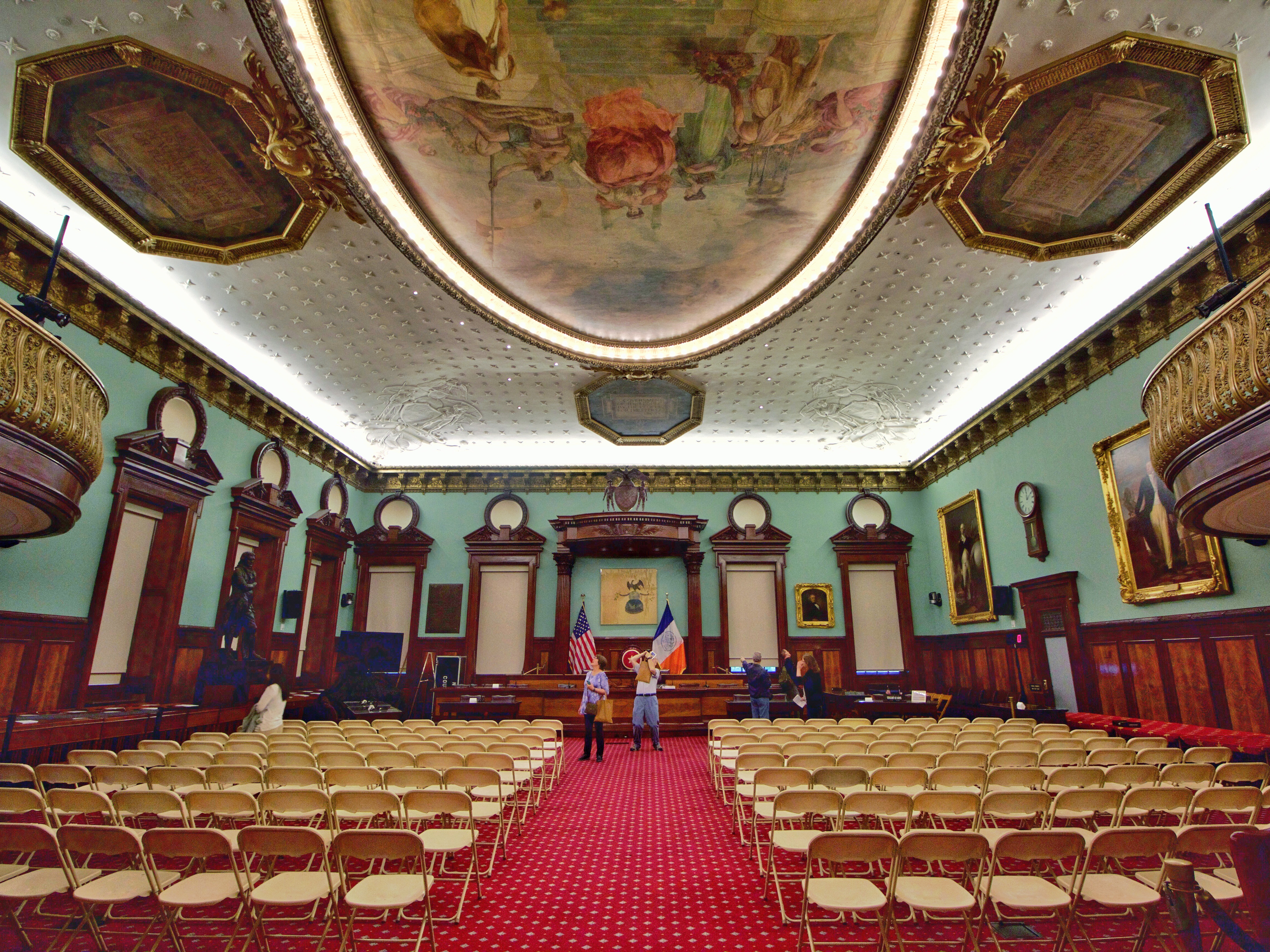
The New York City Council Chamber before the removal of the Thomas Jefferson statue.

On October 18, 2021, New York City Hall unanimously voted to remove the bronze statue of Thomas Jefferson, which had stood in the City Council Chambers for over a century. Jefferson, a founding father of the United States, was also a slave-owning planter who owned 600 slaves. According to New York City Councilwoman Adrienne Adams, the statue represented "some of the most shameful pages in our country's long and nuanced history."

The city remains the owner of the statue, but is lending it for a period of 10 years to the New York Historical Society, "to protect the work and provide the opportunity to exhibit it with historical and educational context".

==== Minnesota Seal and Flag ====
The Minnesota state flag has featured a seal since 1893 that is considered racist toward Native Americans. It shows a white farmer plowing his field, his rifle resting against a stump, while in the background a Native American rides off into the sunset. Interpreted as a representation of a Native American being driven from his land, this symbol has been criticized for its negationist vision of the violence committed against indigenous peoples during the European colonization of Minnesota.

In 2023, the Minnesota State Legislature created a commission to redesign the flag and seal of Minnesota. The commission selected a flag on December 19, 2023, to replace the previous flag starting on May 11, 2024. The new navy and sky blue banner features an eight-pointed star in white for "L'Étoile du Nord", the French symbol and motto of the state. In a statement released on December 19, 2023, Andrew Prekker, the designer of the new flag, said he hoped that "all Minnesotans, regardless of their background, including Indigenous communities and tribal nations that have been historically excluded, can look at our flag with pride and honor, and identify with it."

For the new seal, the commission unanimously adopted a design by Ross Bruggink, depicting a loon, Minnesota's state bird, and the North Star. The new seal also contains the Dakota phrase "Mni Sóta Makoce" which translates to "the land where the waters reflect the sky."

Minnesota flag until May 2024.

Minnesota flag from May 2024.

Minnesota Seal until May 2024.

Minnesota Seal starting May 2024.

== In Asia ==
=== India ===
- Renaming of cities in India

== In Europe ==
=== Ireland ===
- Destruction of Irish country houses (1919–1923)

=== Ukraine ===
- Demolition of monuments to Vladimir Lenin in Ukraine

== In Oceania ==
=== Australia ===
==== Statue of William Crowther in Hobart ====
A bronze statue of William Crowther, the state's colonial premier and controversial racialist surgeon, had stood in Franklin Square in Hobart, Tasmania, since 1889. On August 23, 2023, the Hobart municipality voted to move the statue to the Tasmanian Museum and Art Gallery as a gesture of reconciliation with the Aborigines. This was the first time in Australia that such a decision had been taken.

==== Statues of James Cook and Queen Victoria in Melbourne ====
During January 25, 2024 on the eve of Australia Day, statues of James Cook and Queen Victoria were damaged in Melbourne by Aboriginal protesters. The statue of British explorer James Cook was pulled down, cut at the shins, and its base was covered with the words "The colony will fall". The statue of Victoria, Australia's first queen in 1901, was defaced with red paint.

=== New Zealand ===
==== National flag ====
The national flag of New Zealand, which features the Union Jack in the canton, has been criticized for many years for its reference to the former British Empire. A number of people have proposed alternative designs. In 1979, Foreign Minister Allan Highet suggested creating a new flag with a silver fern on its right side. In 1998, Prime Minister Jenny Shipley supported her Minister of Cultural Affairs Marie Hasler in proposing the quasi-national silver fern flag as an alternative, which features a white fern on a black background, similar to the Canadian flag which features a maple leaf. Canada is frequently cited as an example of a Commonwealth nation that has replaced its flag based on the traditional Union Jack in the canton.

On 22 September 2014, after Prime Minister John Key's party, the National Party, won the general election, he declared that "it was high time to remove the Union Jack from the national flag, which symbolizes the former British colonizer". A two-round referendum was held in 2015–2016. In the second round, 56.6% of citizens voted to keep the existing flag.

Option	Percentage
Existing flag	56.6%
Alternative flag	43.1%

==== Victorian Statuary ====
New Zealand is rich in monuments that celebrate colonial figures, with comparatively little regard for Māori heritage. The controversy over colonial statues in New Zealand predates the Black Lives Matter movement (2013), and has occurred since 1995.

===== First attacks on Victorian statues in 1995 =====
The Māori indigenous rights movement is as old as the European settlement of the island, but emerged in its modern form in the early 1970s, culminating in the 1975 Māori Land March, a protest march in which 5,000 marchers travelled the length of the North Island to Wellington, and presented a petition signed by 60,000 people to Prime Minister Bill Rowling.

A new phase of activism took place in the mid-1990s, with symbolic acts including the attack on Victorian statues. For example, in 1995, Māori activists decapitated the statue of Prime Minister John Ballance in Whanganui during the Moutoa land occupation. Ballance was Prime Minister of New Zealand from 1891 to 1893 and was involved in a number of land reforms, some of which came at great cost to Māori. The statue was replaced in 2009.

===== Peaked during the 2010s =====
In 2016 in Auckland, anti-colonial activists attacked the "Zealandia Memorial" which commemorated the imperial and colonial soldiers who fought for Britain during the New Zealand Wars between 1845 and 1872, which killed 2,154 anti-government Māori according to historian James Cowan. The activists stole the palm and bronze flag that Zealandia held in her left hand.

Also in 2016, a statue of Captain James Cook in Gisborne was repeatedly defaced with red paint, sparking vigorous debate about the legacy of colonialism in New Zealand. Kaiti Beach in Gisborne is where the British explorer first landed in New Zealand with the Endeavour in 1769. His voyage led to the European colonization of New Zealand, a process that resulted in decades of death, disease and cultural degradation for the Māori people.

Another monument in Auckland commemorates Colonel Marmaduke Nixon for his actions during the New Zealand Wars. Nixon was considered a hero by settlers when, in 1864, his troops attacked the unfortified village of Rangiaōwhia, home to elderly men, women and children, and set fire to the church, killing 12 people hiding there. In September 2017, Maori activist Shane Te Pou proposed the removal of his statue. The mayor of Auckland and the activist spoke and agreed not to remove the statue but to "ensure that the events of that time are explained and that the victims of the war are properly acknowledged... There could be a plaque on or next to the monument explaining what happened on both sides. At the moment, what the monument represents is not a very pretty picture".

On January 11, 2018, the "Zealandia Memorial" was again vandalized by activists, who stuck an axe to the statue's head and a poster on the base of the monument, which read "Fascism and White Supremacy are not Welcome Here". After this action, the activist group sent a statement to the press claiming that the memorial was an "ode to the violent and brutal occupation of Māori lands; it celebrates the continued colonization of Aotearoa, its lands and its peoples".

In May 2019, a controversial statue of James Cook was moved from Titirangi Hill in Gisborne to a local museum. In November of the same year, a statue of Queen Victoria was graffitied in Dunedin, with the words "Return stolen wealth Charles" and "Uphold Te Tiriti" ("Uphold the Treaty") painted in red on the base of the monument.

===== Statue of John Hamilton (2020) =====
On June 12, 2020, the city council of Hamilton, New Zealand, removed the statue of John Fane Charles Hamilton, the British commander for whom the city is named after.

The council acknowledged that the removal is part of an effort to rid public spaces of heritage items "seen as representing cultural discord or repression." "More and more people see this statue as a personal and cultural insult," said Mayor Paula Southgate.

Hamilton was a British naval commander who fought against the indigenous Māori defending their lands against British colonial expansion in the 19th century, and was killed in 1864 at the Battle of Pukehinahina.

The removal of the statue had been requested by the Waikato-Tainui Maori tribe, who have also discussed the idea of returning the town to its original Maori name Kirikiriroa, and who are careful to identify street names that are offensive to their people.

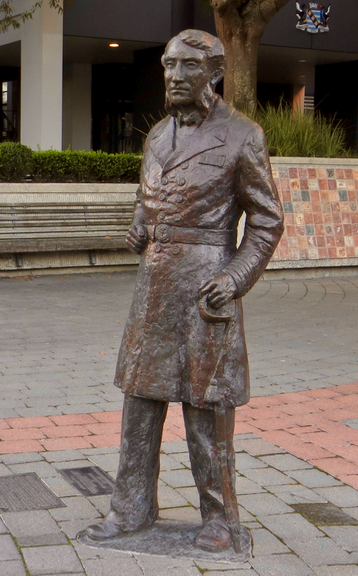
Statue of Captain John Hamilton in Hamilton, NZ (2017)

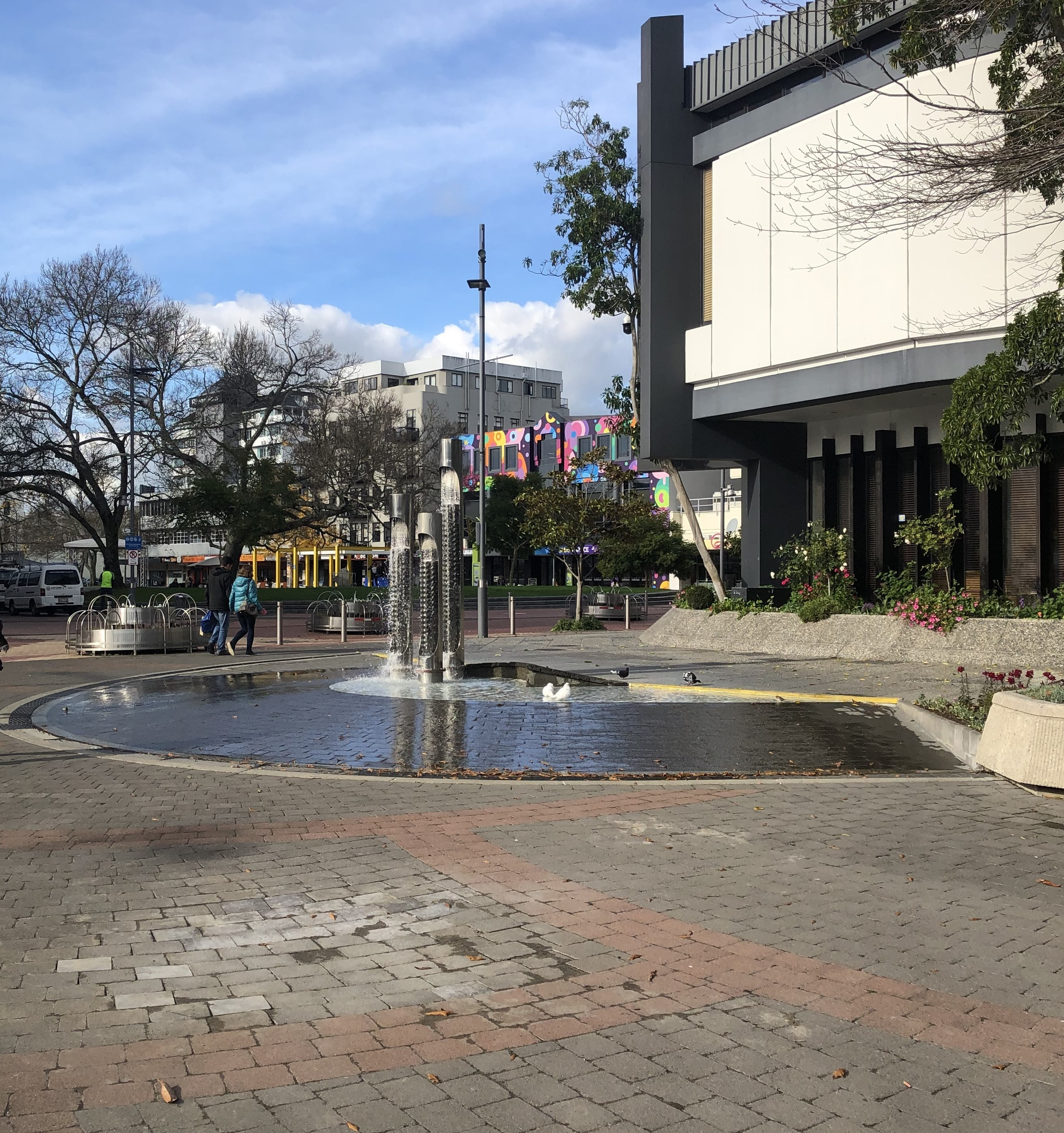
The empty location after its unbolting in June 2020.

== See also ==
- De-commemoration
- Decolonization
- Decolonization of knowledge
- Decolonizing the Mind
- Decommunization
- Black Lives Matter
- Rhodes Must Fall
- Postcolonialism
- Woke
- Cancel culture
- Native American mascot controversy
- Karfa Diallo
