= De-commemoration =

Process of removing or recontextualizing memorials

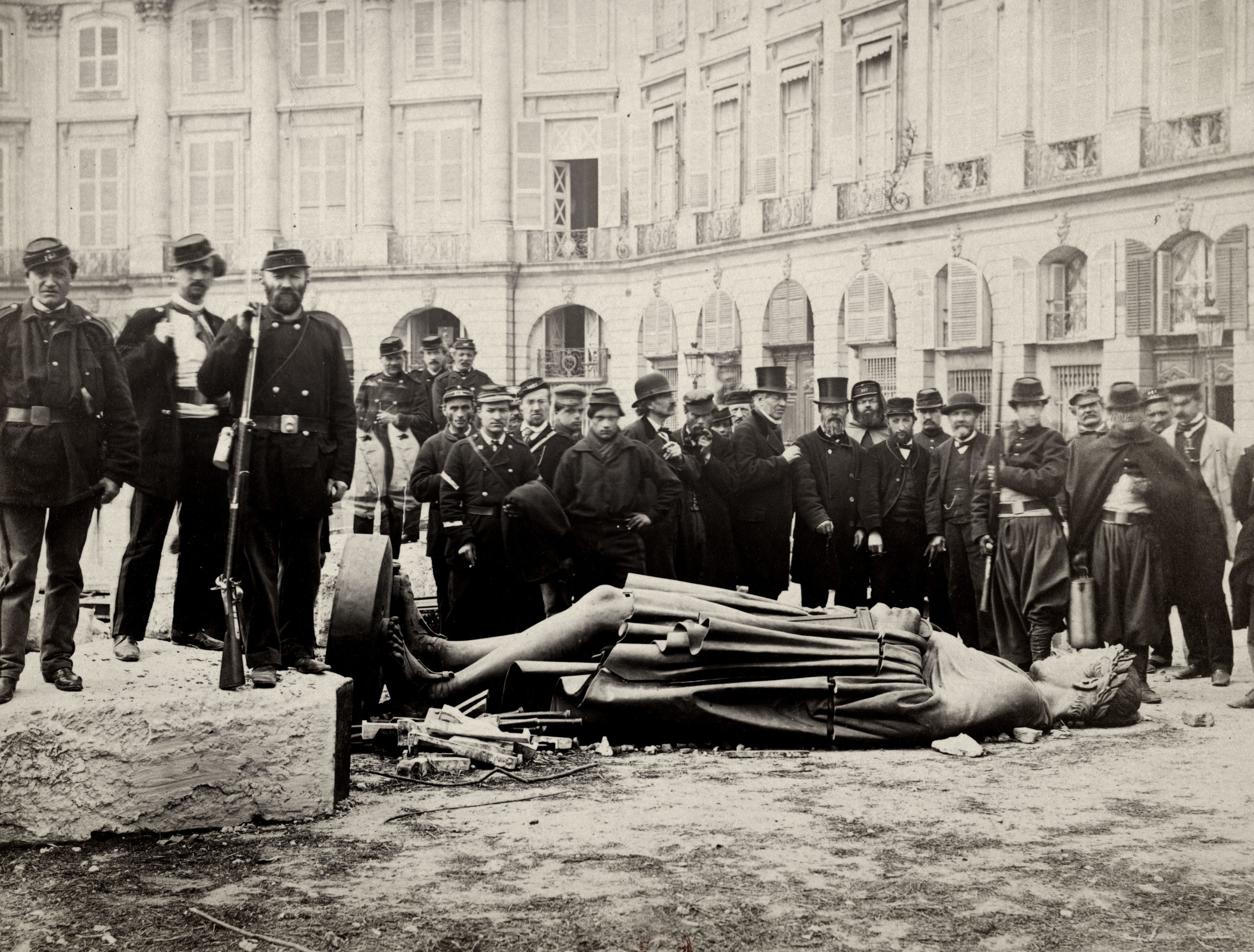
Fall of the Vendôme Column and its statue of Napoleon during the Paris Commune, Bruno Braquehais, Place Vendôme, May 16, 1871

De-commemoration is a social phenomenon that regards the destruction or profound modification of material representations of the past in public space, representing the opposite or undoing of memorialization. The precise term was coined by Israeli historian Guy Beiner in 2018.

== Definition ==
De-commemoration is the set of "processes in which material and public representations of the past are removed, destroyed or fundamentally modified". Guy Beiner introduced the concept of de-commemorating in reference to hostility towards acts of commemoration that can result in violent assaults and in iconoclastic defacement or destruction of monuments. Beiner's studies suggested that rather than stamping out memorialization and giving an impression of freedom from the past, de-commemorating can paradoxically function as a form of ambiguous remembrance, sustaining interest in controversial memorials. The very dishonor that damage or removal brings to the memorial gives it back its importance in a distinct way juxtaposed to commemorative plaques, statues, and monuments that recall the past in public spaces that are very often ignored in everyday life. Destruction of monuments can also trigger renewed acts of memorialization (which Beiner labelled "re-commemorating").

== Practices ==
According to the framework of sociologists Tracy Adams and Yinon Guttel-Klei, three types of practices can be identified related to the phenomenon. The most widespread is desacralization, that is, desecration and destruction of the monument. The second practice is reframing, which consists of showing the controversial past by recontextualizing the memorial or giving it a new meaning. In practice, this can involve adding explanatory plaques or renaming memorial spaces and streets, thus changing the status and symbolism of monuments or landscapes. The third practice, planned obsolescence, is rarer and refers to monuments deliberately built with a limited lifespan in order to criticize real established monuments or they are installed to spark controversy and thus provoke their demolition.

De-commemoration is not a recent social phenomenon, and has involved five different approaches in historical examples according to a framework set by Sarah Gensburger and Jenny Wüstenberg. It can be the result of a change in political regime and then aims to adapt the symbolic landscape. This is the case, for example, in France after the First Empire, in colonized countries after their independence, or after the collapse of communist regimes in Eastern Europe.

De-commemoration can also be linked to a societal transformation that makes monuments or place names appear anachronistic, for example by trying to reduce the over-representation of male statues or street names, or in New Zealand by making room for memorials to Maori people, history, and culture. It can also result from forceful action, from a mobilization that directly aims to provoke changes in the memorial landscape. This is the type of de-commemoration, such as that carried out during and following the Black Lives Matter movement, or in Latin American countries confronted with the legacy of colonialism, or in European ports regarding the Atlantic slave trade. This type of de-commemoration is often the kind that is most spread and documented in mass media, in particular regarding the decolonization of public spaces.

De-commemoration can also sometimes act as a smokescreen, a maneuver by those in charge to prevent political change or to sidestep a debate on the past, as in postcolonial Namibia. Finally, it leads, more rarely, to a transformation in the way of thinking about memory, to reconsidering commemoration itself. This rarely happens because the tendency is to replace the destroyed monument with another of different meaning but of the same type. However, de-commemoration also leads to questioning and modifying the legislative frameworks of memorial uses and sometimes to resorting to new technological tools with how memorials are conceived, created, and interpreted.

== Examples ==
De-commemoration of statues

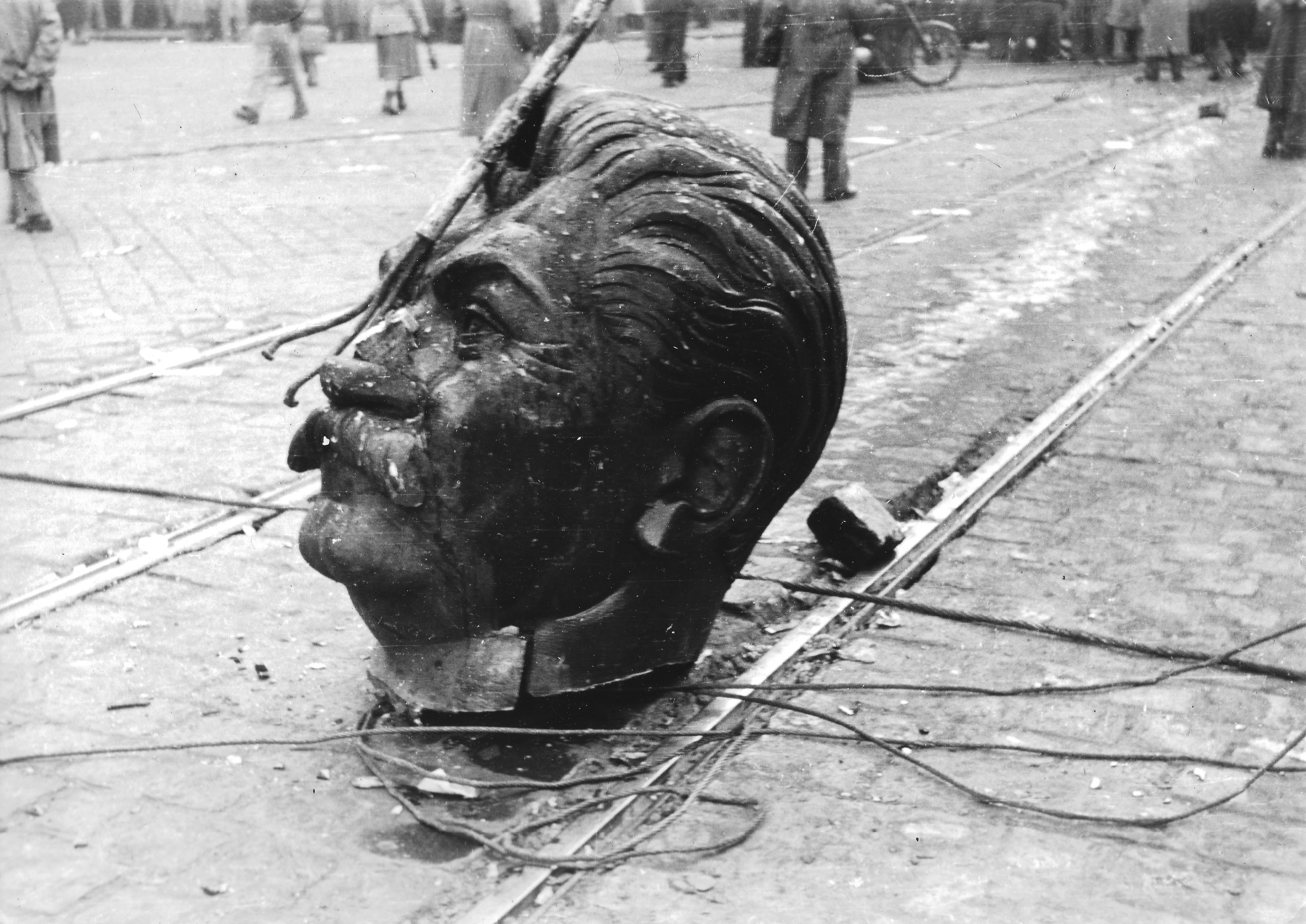
Damaged head of the statue of Joseph Stalin in Budapest, Hungary, in 1956.

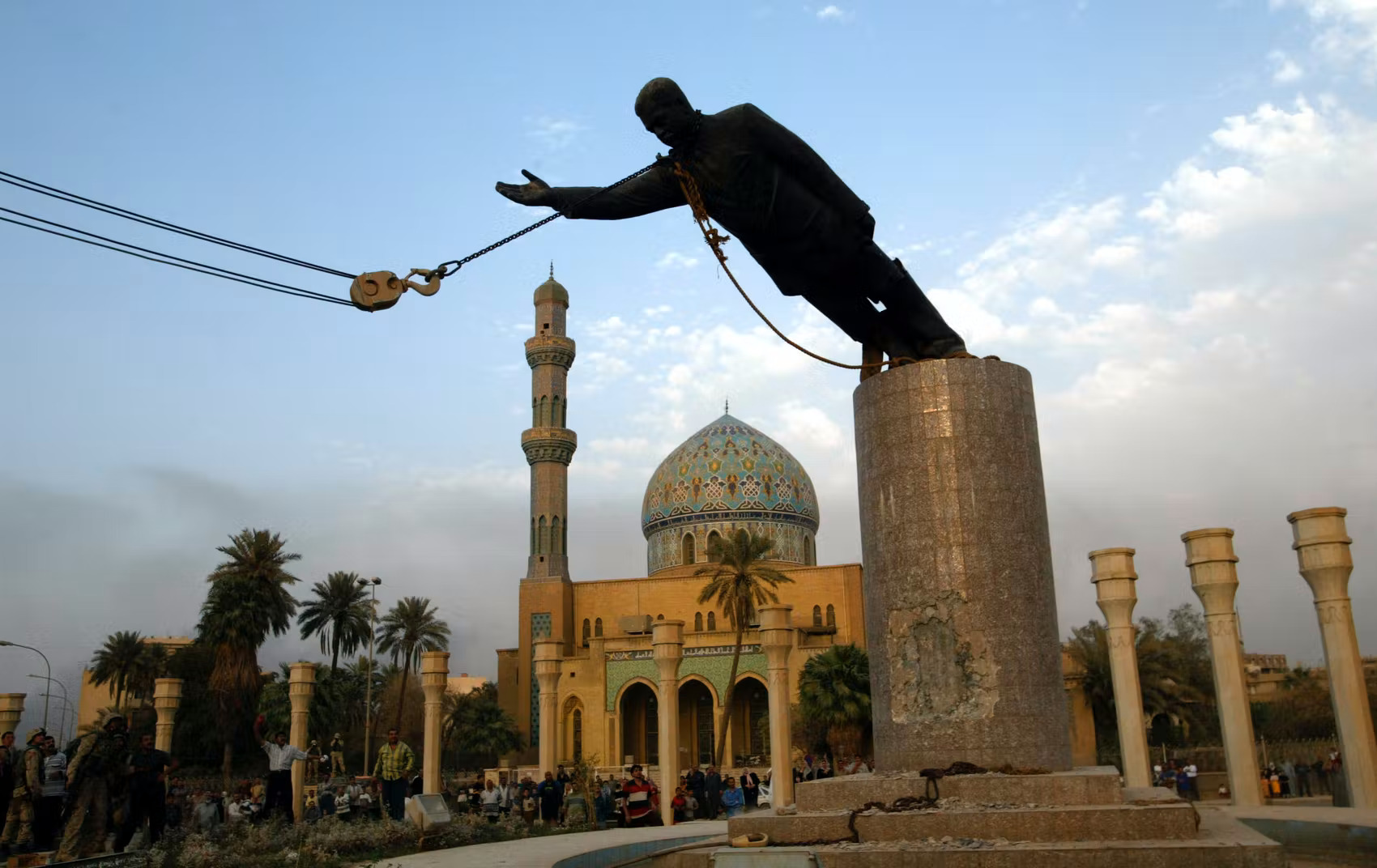
The toppling of the statue of Saddam Hussein in Baghdad, Iraq, in 2003.

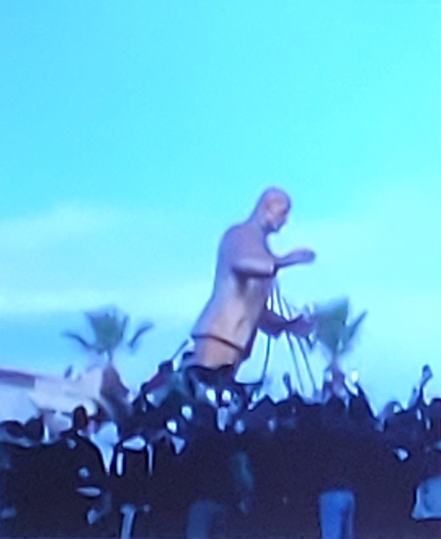
The toppling of the statue of Hafez al-Assad in Latakia, Syria, in 2024.

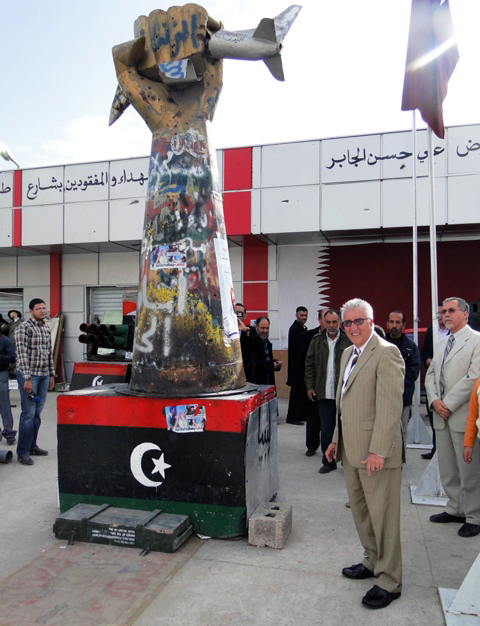
The Fist Crushing a U.S. Fighter Plane monument of Muammar Gaddafi vandalized by rebels who toppled it after the fall of Tripoli and moved it to Misrata, Libya, in 2011.

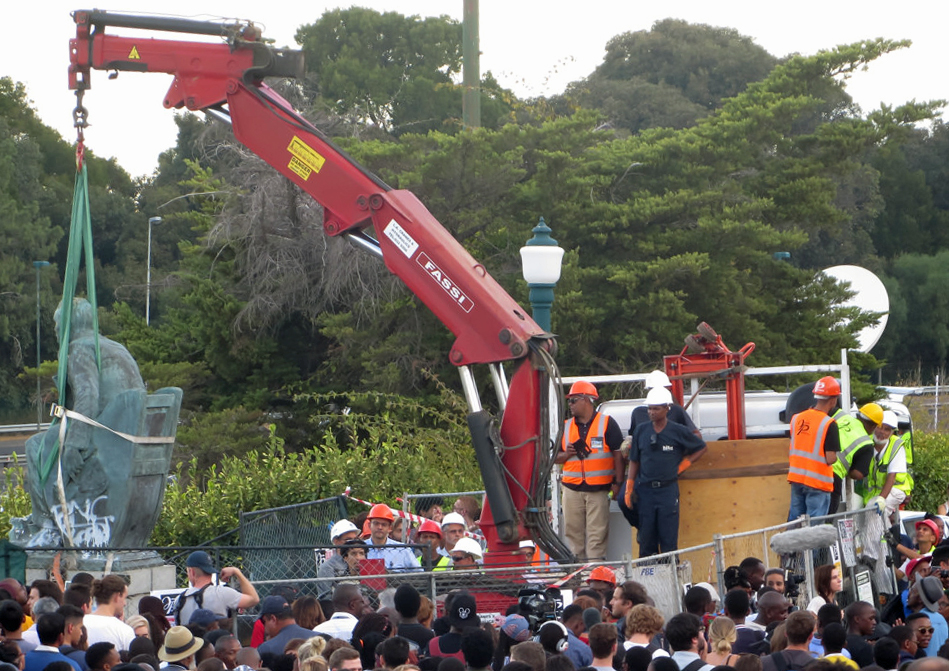
Removal of the statue of Cecil Rhodes at the University of Cape Town at South Africa in April 2015.

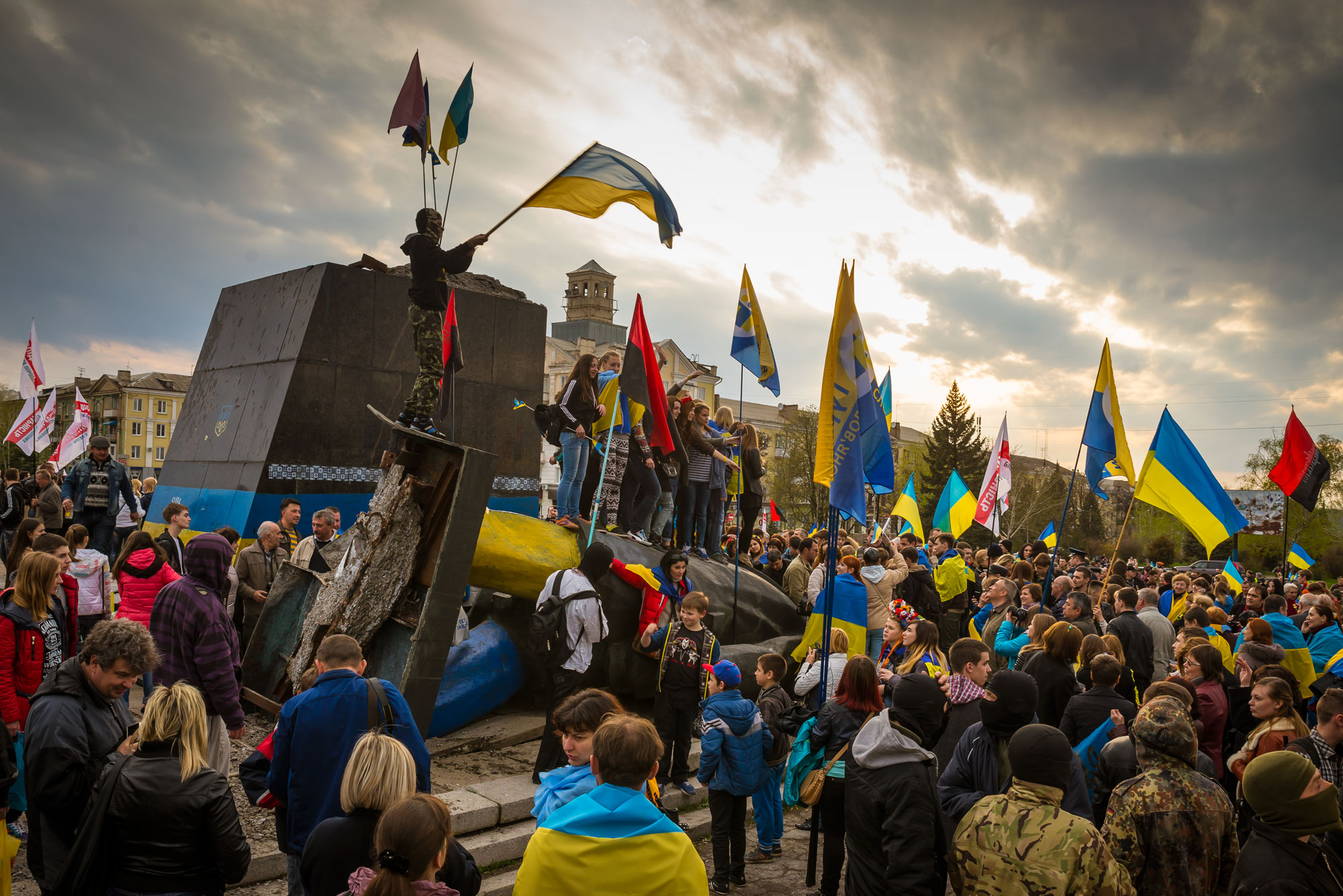
The unbolting of the statue of Lenin in Kramatorsk (Ukraine) in April 2015.

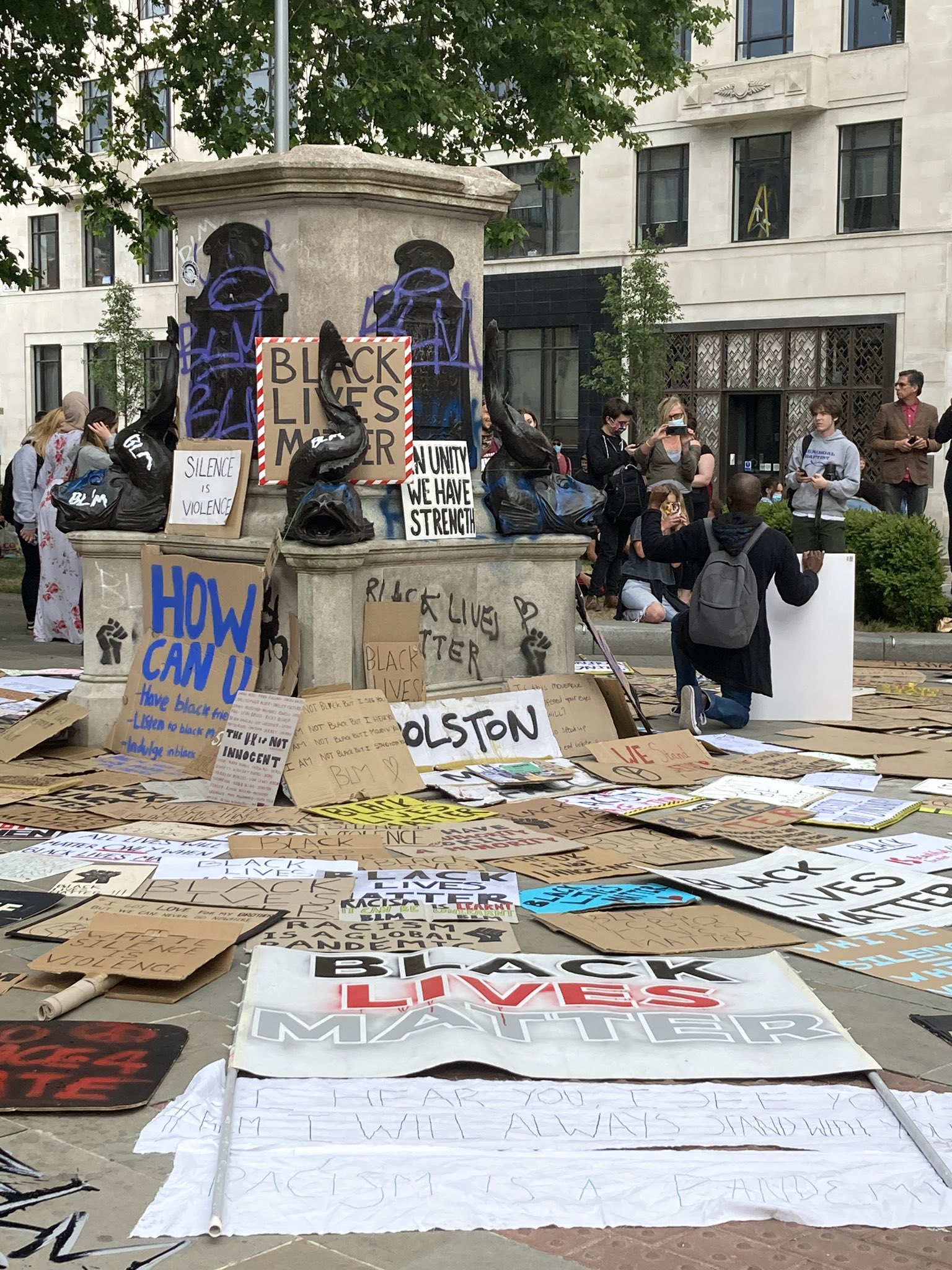
The empty pedestal of the statue of Edward Colston in Bristol, UK, which was pulled down on June 7, 2020.

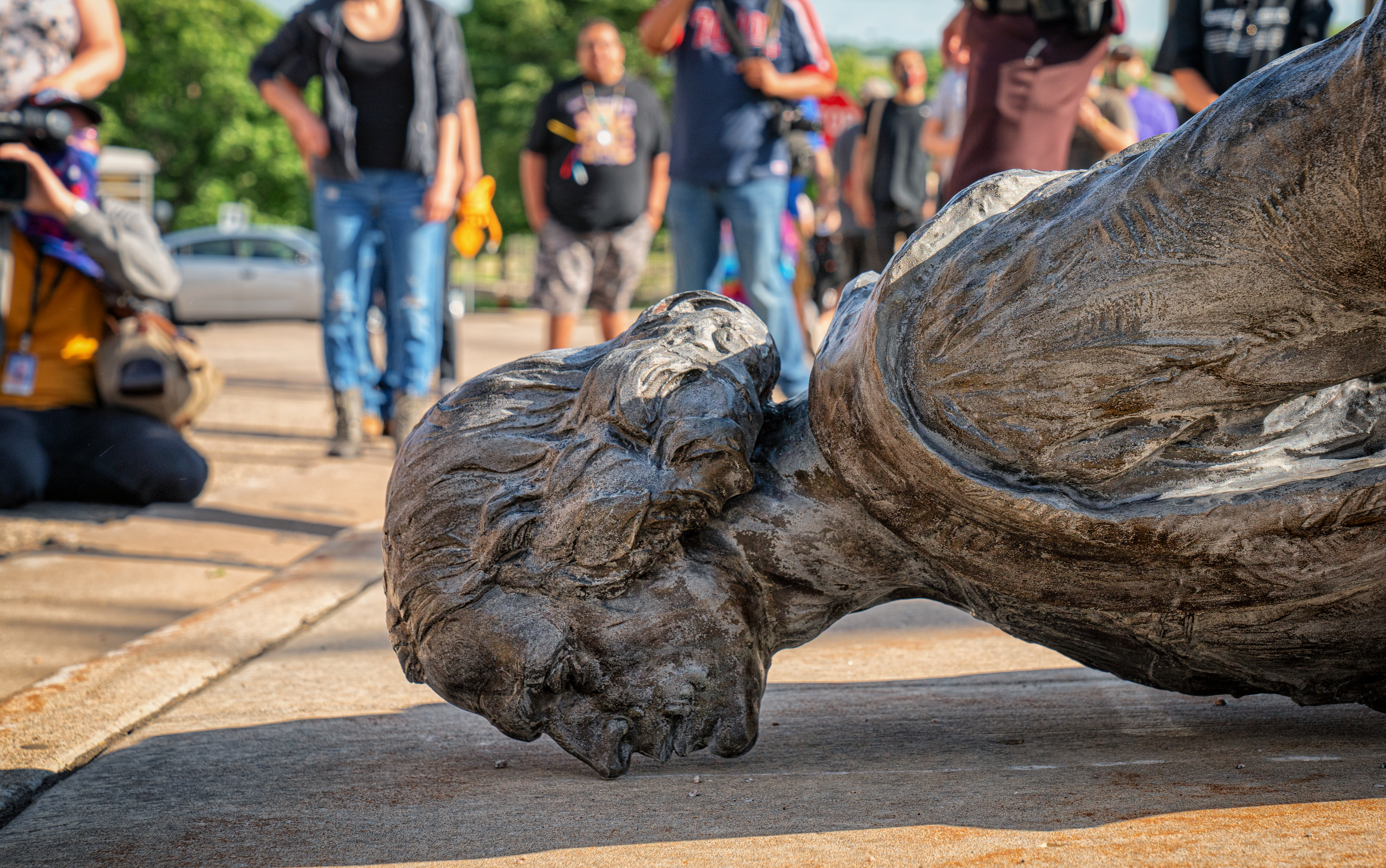
Statue of Christopher Columbus on the ground in Saint Paul, Minnesota (United States) on June 10, 2020.

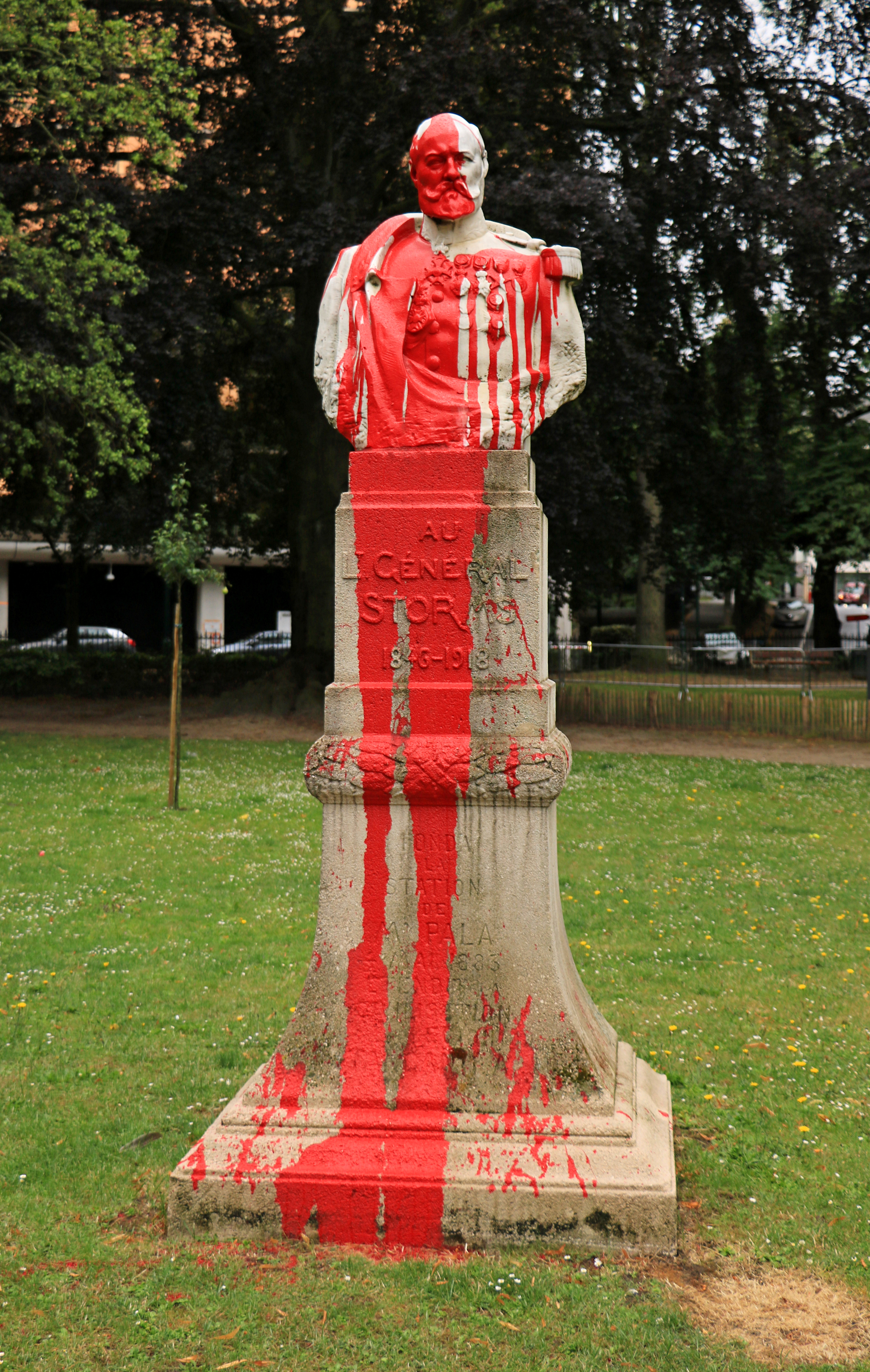
The monument to General Émile Storms covered in red paint in June 2020. The statue was removed in June 2022 by the municipality of Ixelles (Belgium).

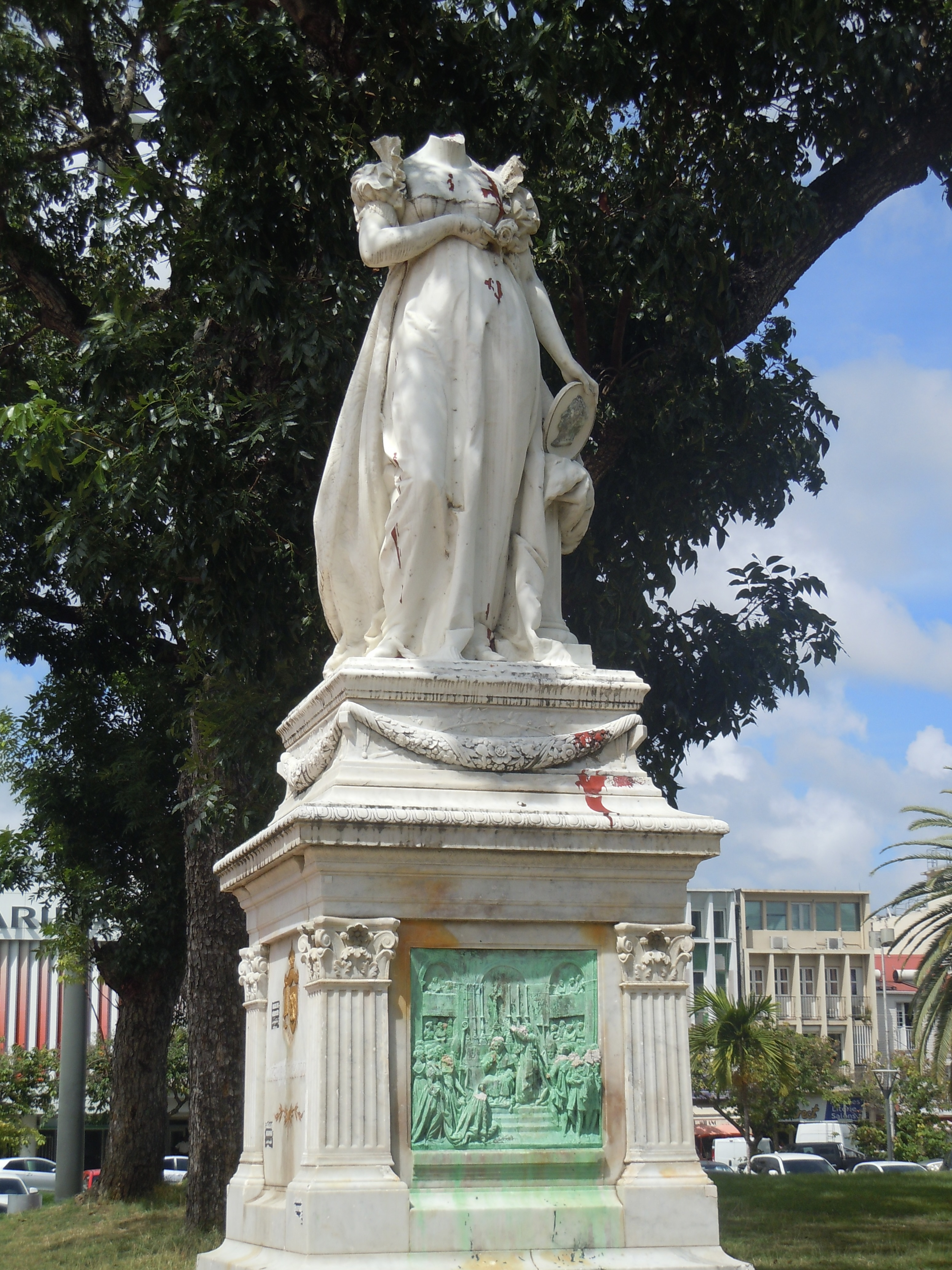
Statue of Empress Josephine in Fort-de-France (Martinique), decapitated in 1991 and destroyed on July 26, 2020.

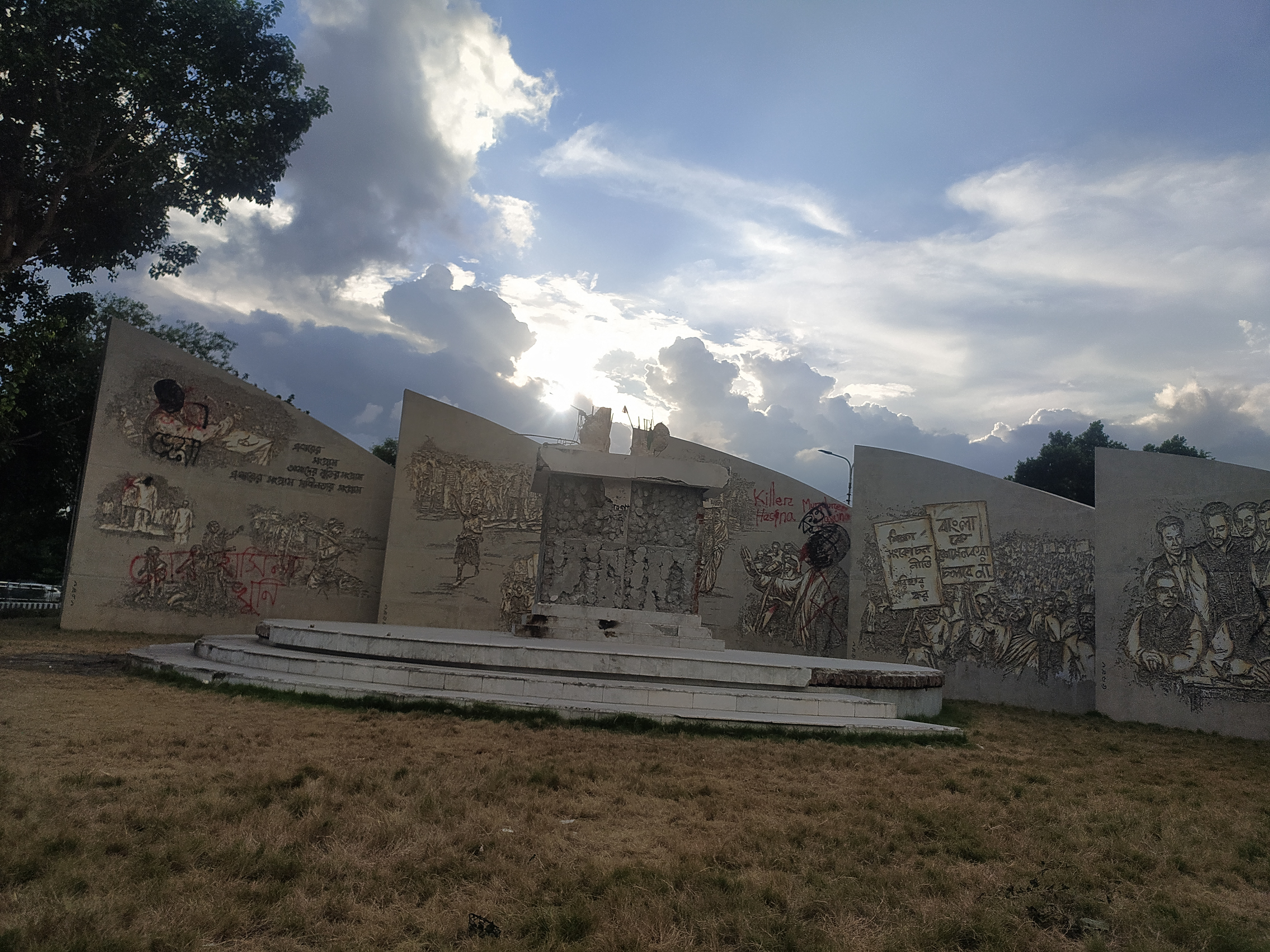
Destroyed statue of Sheikh Mujibur Rahman in Dhaka, Bangladesh, in August 2024.
Street renaming

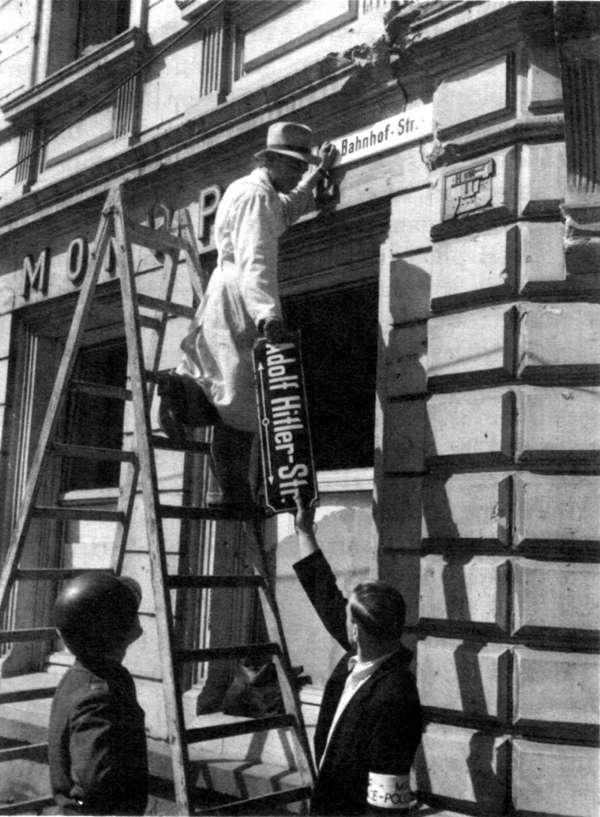
The Adolf-Hitler-Straße (Adolf-Hitler Street) in Trier (Germany) renamed Bahnhofstraße (Station Street) on May 12, 1945.

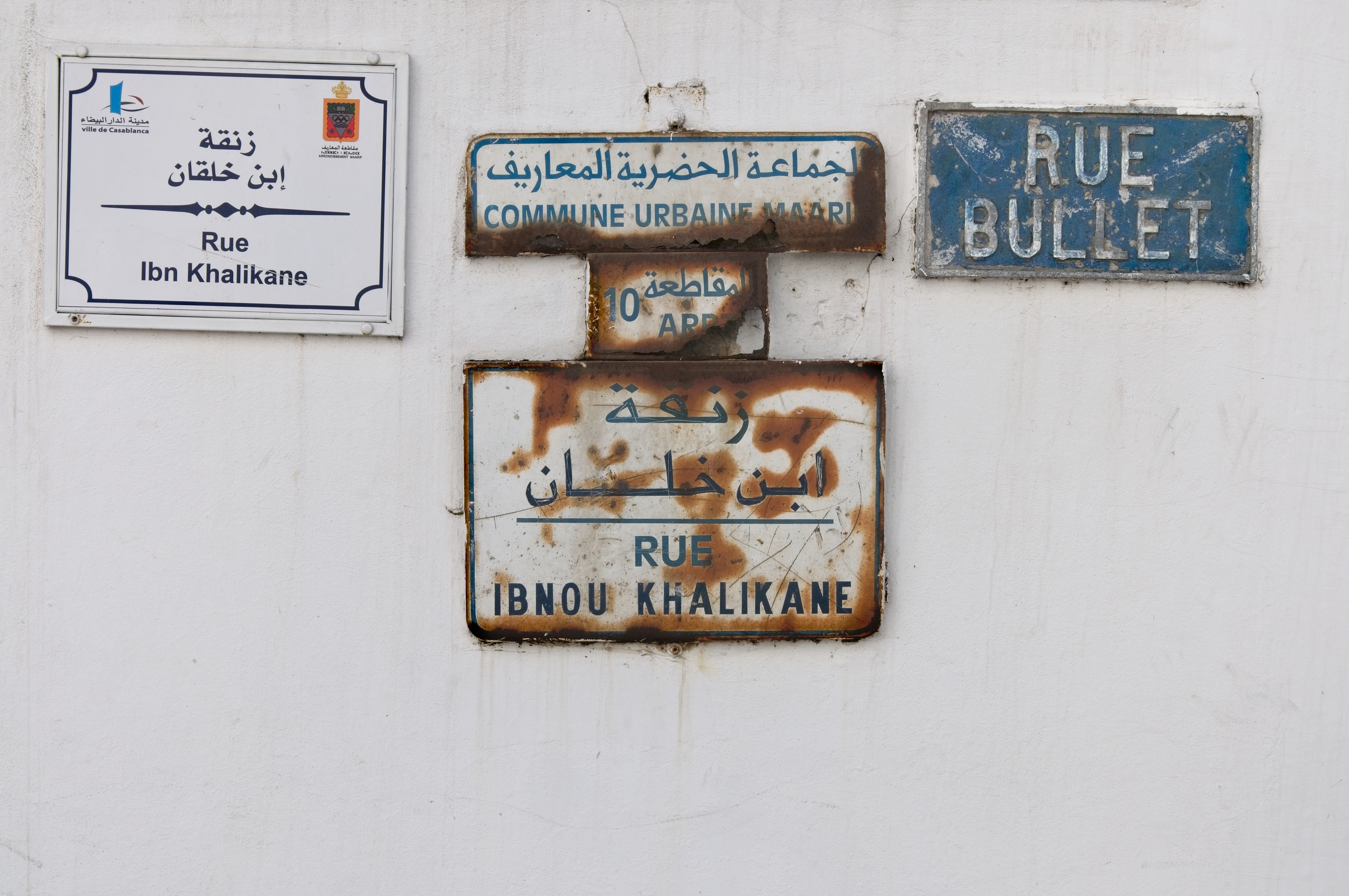
Bullet Street in Casablanca renamed Ibnou Khalikane Street after Morocco's independence on March 2, 1956.

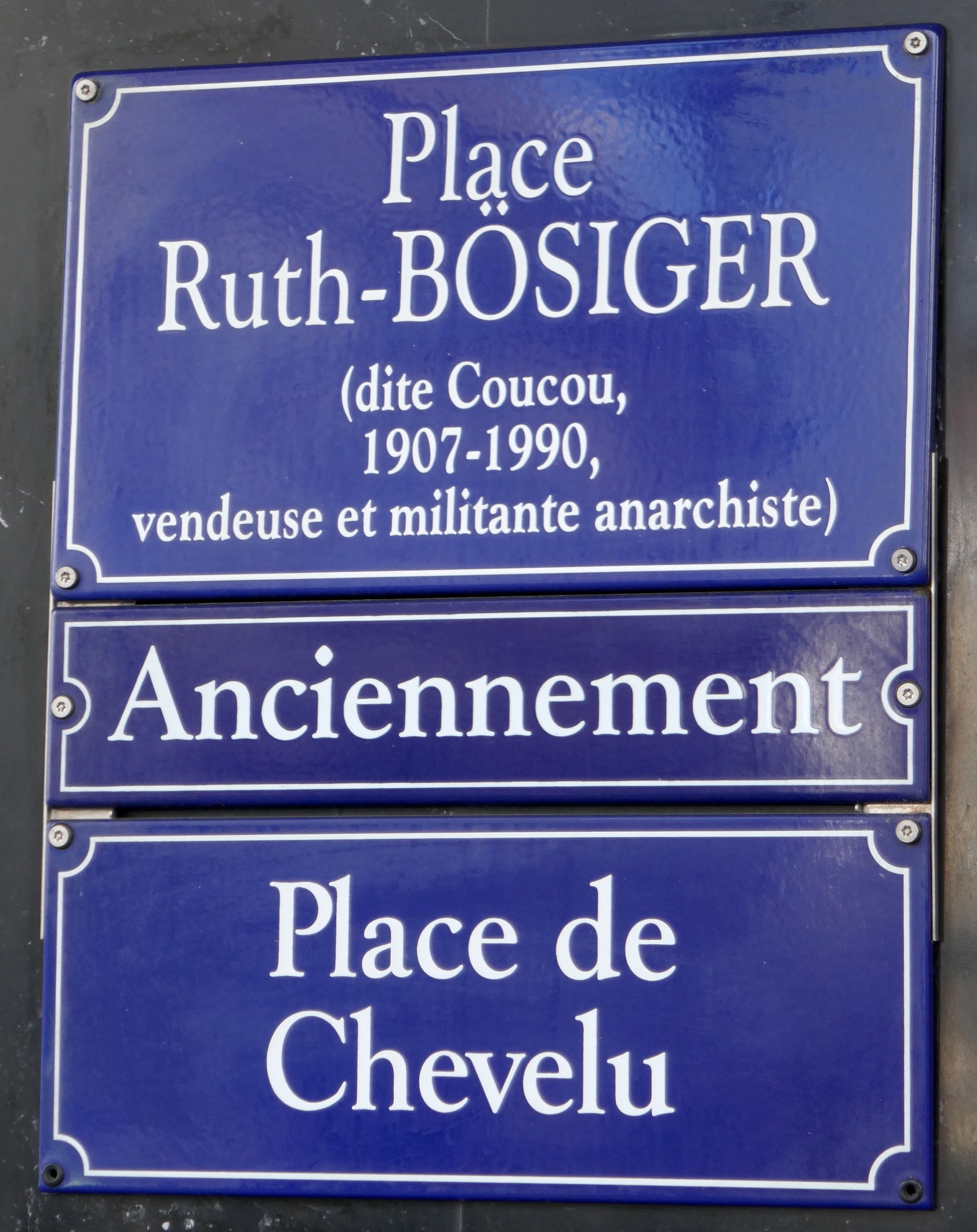
Place du Chevelu in Geneva, officially renamed to Place Ruth-Bösiger in September 2020.

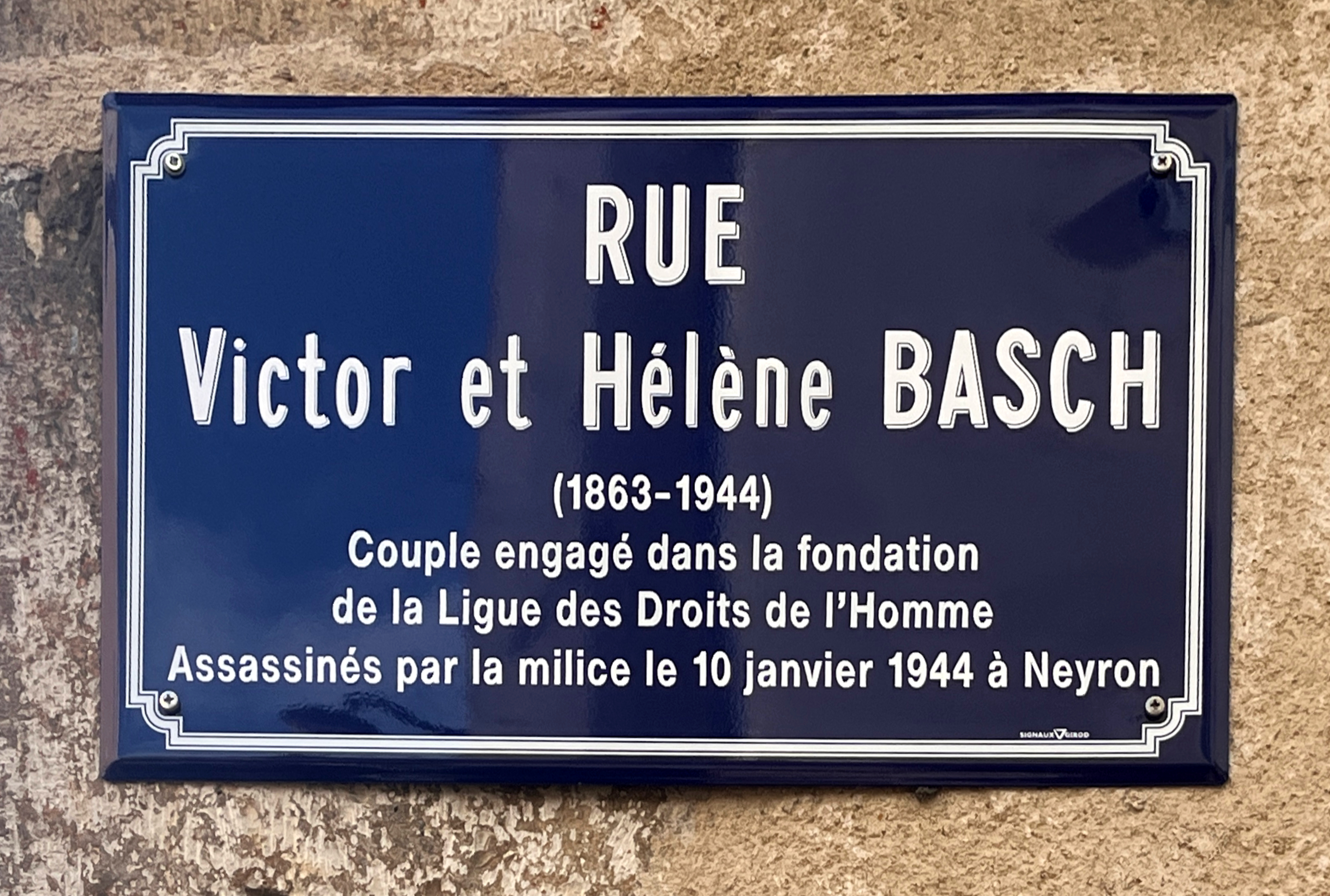
Renaming of rue Victor-Basch in Bourg-en-Bresse (Ain) to rue Victor-et-Hélène Basch in 2023.

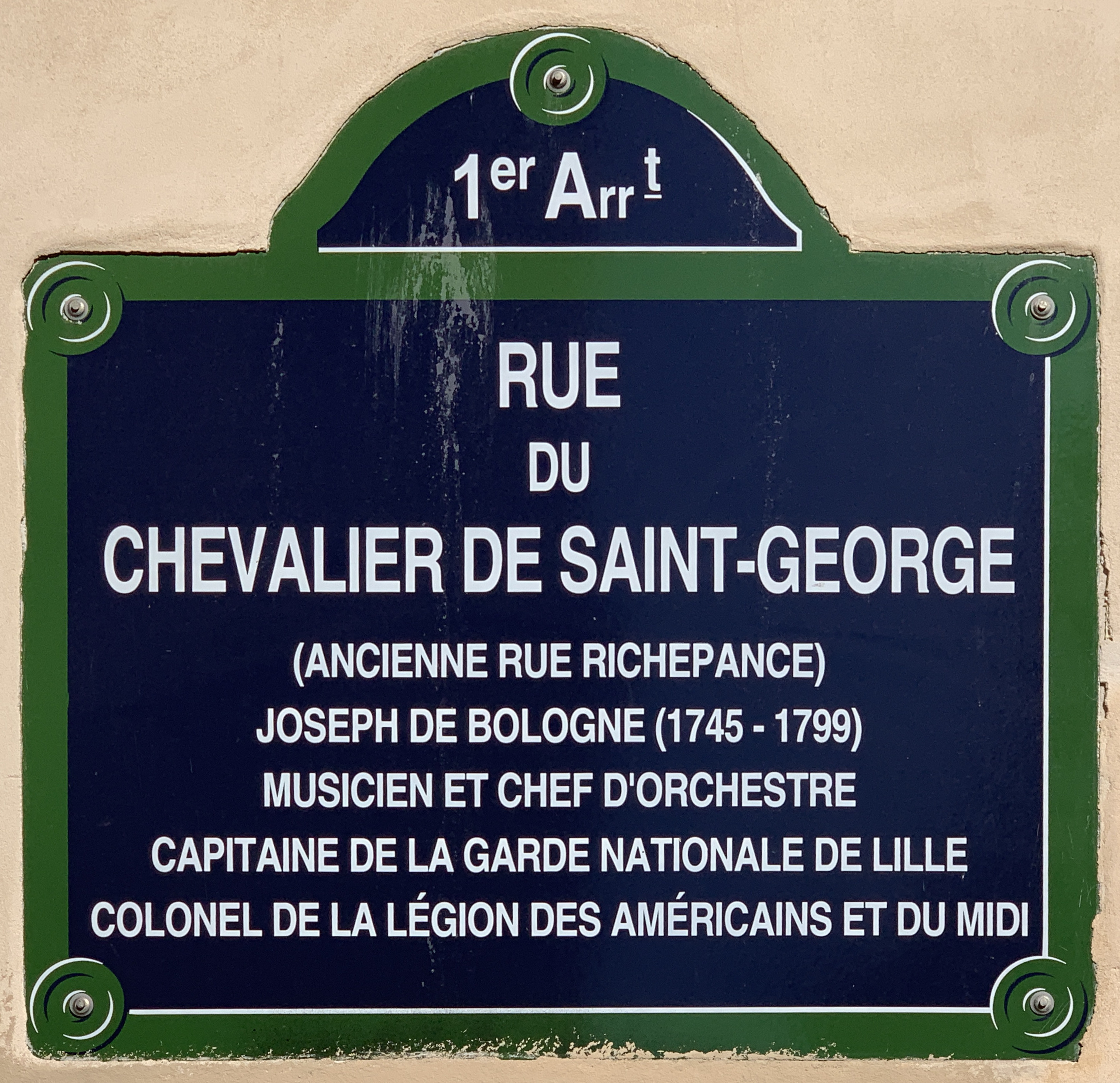
Former rue Richepance in Paris, renamed rue du Chevalier-de-Saint-Georges in 2002

== See also ==
- Memorialization
- Transitional Justice
- Damnatio memoriae

=== Examples ===
- Decolonization of public space
- List of monuments and memorials removed during the George Floyd protests
- Removal of Confederate monuments and memorials
- Demolition of monuments to Alexander Pushkin in Ukraine
- Demolition of monuments to Vladimir Lenin in Ukraine
- Firdos Square statue destruction
