= Christophe Muzungu =

Congolese politician

Christophe Muzungu Kabemba is a Congolese politician. He was the interim governor of the city of Kinshasa in the Democratic Republic of Congo from May until November 26, 2001.

Muzungu was Minister of Arts and Culture, As such, he spoke out for promotion and protection of the cultural heritage of the Congo region. In February 2005, he decided to reinstate the statue of King Leopold II. He noted that the beginning of the Congo Free State had been a time of some economic and social progress. He argued that people should recognize some positive aspects of the king as well as the negative. However, hours after the six-metre (20 ft) statue was installed near Kinshasa's central station, it was officially removed. Muzungu resigned after the cabinet reshuffle of November 18, 2005.

During his ministry, he wrote Vagabond, a book that deals in depth with the phenomenon "shege" in Kinshasa.
