= Lucas Samalenge =

Congolese politician (1928–1961)

- Lucas Samalenge writing, 1961.
- President: Moïse Tshombe

Secretary of State of Information of the State of Katanga
- In office October 1960 – 19 November 1961

Personal details
- Born: 2 October 1928
- Died: 19 November 1961 (aged 33) 120 km northwest of Élisabethville, Republic of the Congo
- Party: Confédération des associations tribales du Katanga

Lucas Samalenge (2 October 1928 – 19 November 1961) was a Congolese and Katangese politician who was Katanga's Secretary of State of Information.

== Early life and career ==
Samalenge was born on 2 October 1928. He became a nationally elected Member of Parliament for the CONAKAT party for the district of Élisabethville. This party consisted mostly of Southern Katangese people, including Moïse Tshombe and Godefroid Munongo. He was the only MP of his party to vote the investiture at the Lumumba Government in June 1960.

During the mutiny of the Force Publique, on 5 July, a Provincial Council in Élisabethville reexamined the appointment of a State Commissioner for the Katanga Province. Jason Sendwe, Tshombe's main political rival, held the position, but the Council opposed his appointment. The candidates who were put forward to replace Sendwe were Boniface Mwepu, Samalenge, and Bonaventure Makonga. Sendwe, however, retained his position.

== Katangese secession ==
"Mr. Lucas Samalenge, Secretary of State of Information, is characterised by his anti-Belgian sentiments and his Francophilia which moved him to introduce people to his cabinet who were equally picturesque and adventurous as incompetent. He does not perform any actions at his department, completely left to the initiatives of the heterogeneous staff, the most active being an agronomist. After several years of existence, that department has not yet found its equilibrium and is reorganised by Mr. [Gabriel] Letellier, of Paris."

— Frédéric Vandewalle and Jacques Brassinne in a November 1961 report about the situation in Katanga. (Note: Gabriel Letellier was a collaborator at the Katangese representation in Paris under Resident Minister Dominique Diur.)

Flag of the State of Katanga

When Katangese provincial governor Moïse Tshombe declared the independence of the State of Katanga from the Congo, four delegations were sent out abroad to explain what happened in the region. They were headed by Jean-Baptiste Kibwe, Évariste Kibwe, Henri Ndala Kambola, and Samalenge. Samalenge's delegation further consisted of H. Schumacker and Rémy Kabamba. They were to organise, in Brazzaville, a clandestine office for propaganda destined for the Republic of the Congo, the "Voice of Liberty" (Voix de la liberté), and get in touch with resistance movements such as Jabako (youth wing of Abako), Jepuna (youth wing of Puna), MNC-Kalonji and organise a propaganda campaign.

In October 1960, five Secretariats of State were created in Katanga, thereby enlarging the government. Samalenge became the Secretary of State of Information. His Chef de cabinet was the Belgian journalist Etienne Ugeux and deputy Chef de cabinet was Barthélemy Bwengu. Public relations officer for Samalenge's office was Christian Souris, who later wrote a novel based on true facts under the pseudonym Christian Lanciney, named Les héros sont affreux. Ugeux's son Dominique Ugeux claimed that Tshombe alerted Etienne Ugeux that Samalenge had no experience in the field of information and was only picked for political and ethnic reasons.

According to political scientist Catherine Hoskyns, his office had a dual function of offering a Katangese nationalism for the Katangese people, and to brand the country as a peaceful, prosperous, Western-oriented state endangered by black nationalism and pro-communist forces in the Congo and at the United Nations. The information secretariat coordinated the Katangese representations in Brussels (headed by Jacques Masangu), Paris (headed by Dominique Diur), and the Katanga Information Services in New York (headed by Michel Struelens), as well as the various pro-Katangese groups abroad. In March 1961, Tshombe sent out Samalenge to Paris for several months in order to negotiate with ORTF the creation of a television station in Katanga, which did not exist at the time. According to Etienne Ugeux's son, this was done by Tshombe to remove Samalenge from his office for a few months because of his "incompetence". He characterised Samalenge as an "inveterate show-off" who "liked the good life".

The propaganda efforts abroad in Katanga and abroad were successful. After Operation Rum Punch in August 1961, it seemed as if the secession was on its last legs, but the failure of Operation Morthor and the death of UN Secretary-General Dag Hammarskjöld further consolidated the regime. Samalenge issued a statement in October 1961 in which he boasted that the 1.7 million Katangans have defeated the whole United Nations of more than 2 billion people, which succeeded because Katanga was in the right, according to him. Samalenge was known for his fierce opposition to the United Nations and his wish for closer ties between Katanga and neighbouring Northern Rhodesia. Several times, UN officials asked Tshombe to remove Samalenge from office.

== Assassination of Lumumba ==
At the time of the arrival of prisoners Patrice Lumumba, Maurice Mpolo, and Joseph Okito in a Douglas DC-4 plane at the airport of Luano in Katanga's capital Élisabethville during the afternoon of 17 January 1961, Samalenge was at the Cinéma Palace movie theatre with his Chef de cabinet Etienne Ugeux and Tshombe at a screening of the Moral Re-Armament campaign when Tshombe was called to his residence somewhere between 16:00 and 17:00. Minister of Finance Jean-Baptiste Kibwe later denied that Samalenge was present when the three Congolese politicians were assassinated near Élisabethville, but other sources place him at the execution.

Samalenge was one of the first individuals, or perhaps the first individual, to reveal Lumumba's death. According to Carlo Huyghé, he went on a pub crawl on the streets of the capital on 18 January and drunkenly confided to journalist Léopold Daffe of the Secretariat of Information the details of the assassination. (Note: Previously, Léopold Daffe was condemned by the Brussels Criminal Court to three months in prison and a fine on 22 February 1956 for manslaughter. While drunk, he set fire to the Brussels bar Club du Congo in January 1953, killing three people.) According to Ludo De Witte, Samalenge went to the busy bar Le Relais and told everyone that Lumumba was murdered and he kicked his corpse. He then went around repeating the story until the police took him away.

== Death ==
Lucas Samalenge died on 19 November 1961 under suspicious circumstances. Jules Chomé, Belgian lawyer and critic of the Katangese secession (and, later, a notable critic of Mobutu Sese Seko) reported that he officially died during a hunting incident, but that he was probably assassinated because he knew too much about the death of Lumumba. According to the official version, Frédéric Vandewalle wrote, Samalenge was the victim of a hunting accident caused by a member of his cabinet, but the public rumour suggested an assassination. The alleged incident took place in the woods 120 km northwest of Élisabethville. His body showed gunshot wounds in his neck, and when he was found, the two people accompanying Samalenge already disappeared. They were never identified. The Katangese police opened an inquiry concerning the circumstances of Samalenge's death. They arrested Elie Tshansa, who was arrested in Kipushi when he tried to cross the border into Rhodesia. Tshobme, as well as ministers Jean-Baptiste Kibwe, Évariste Kimba, and Godefroid Munongo visited the prisoner.

Samalenge's death occurred during the same week of Katangese Minister of National Education Joseph Kiwele's death of a brain thrombosis on 14 November.

== Legacy ==
In 1961, a literary competition named "Lucas Samalenge" was organised in Élisabethville.

== See also ==
- List of unsolved deaths
