= Salomon Tshizand =

Congolese and Katangese politician

Minister of Economic Affairs of the State of Katanga
- In office June 1960 – 23 May 1961

Personal details
- Born: 1913; Sandoa, Belgian Congo
- Died: 23 May 1961; Brazzaville, Republic of the Congo
- Political party: Independent

Salomon Tshizand (1913–1961) was a Congolese and Katangese politician.

== Life ==
Salomon Tshizand was born in Sandoa in 1913 in a Lunda family. He attended a Methodist school, and was a deeply religious Methodist. He attended the Mulungwishi Methodist Seminary for three years and became a Methodist priest.

On 16 June 1960, before the independence of the Congo from Belgium on 30 June 1960, Tshizand was voted as the Minister of Economic Affairs of the Provincial Assembly of the Katanga Province, with three voices. On 11 July 1960, President of the Provincial Assembly Moise Tshombe declared the independence of the State of Katanga. Tshizand became the Minister of Economic Affairs of the secessionist state. His cabinet consisted of Jean Nawej as his Chef de Cabinet and Pherson Nguza as his Deputy Chef de Cabinet.

On 15 January 1961, two days before the assassination of first Prime Minister of the Congo Patrice Lumumba, Tshizand attended a meeting together with other Katangese authorities Moïse Tshombe, Jean-Baptiste Kibwe, Frédéric Vandewalle, Colonel Crèvecœur, Guy Weber, Jacques Bartelous, and ONUC authorities. According to the Belgian parliamentary inquiry into the Lumumba assassination, it is not excluded that the possible transfer of Lumumba to Katanga was discussed during the meeting.

From 24 March to 6 April 1961, Tshizand led a Katangese delegation to Paris. The report of the mission mentioned that many organisations and companies expressed pro-Katangese sentiments, such as the Union Aéromaritime de Transport, CFAO (entreprise), and Conseil national du patronat français.

== Death ==
In May 1961, Tshizand went on an official economic mission to Congo-Brazzaville, whose President Fulbert Youlou backed Katanga. Tshizand died of a heart attack during the mission in Brazzaville. As he was a Methodist priest, the funeral service took place at the Methodist Church in Élisabethville. Katanga's Interior Minister Godefroid Munongo gave the funeral oration.
