= Jacques Bartelous =

Belgian civil servant

- Jacques Bartelous in a VRT documentary about Moïse Tshombe

Chef de cabinet of Moïse Tshombe
- In office July 1, 1960 – August 31, 1961
- President: Moïse Tshombe

Personal details
- Born: March 6, 1924; Forest, Belgium
- Died: 3 September 2013 (aged 89); Dinant, Belgium
- Spouse: Geneviève Petit
- Education: Saint-Louis University, Brussels; Catholic University of Leuven (Doctor of Law)

Jacques Bartelous (6 March 1924 – 3 September 2013) was a Belgian colonial civil servant who later became the Chef de cabinet of Moïse Tshombe, President of the unrecognized State of Katanga. Bartelous was born in the Brussels municipality of Forest in 1924. He was a volunteer in the Belgian army during the Second World War from December 1944 to October 1945 and received several distinctions for his participation in the war.

Bartelous started his career in the Belgian Congo as a legal attaché in Élisabethville, current-day Lubumbashi, in November 1958. From August 1959 to January 1960, he was the head of the political office at the local affairs service of the Katanga Province. In May and June 1960, the final months of the Belgian Congo before independence, Bartelous was a substitute to the Royal prosecutor (French: substitut du Procureur du roi) in Kindu, capital of Maniema Province.

== Career in the independent Congo and State of Katanga ==
At the request of Moïse Tshombe, head of the provincial government of Katanga, Bartelous became his Chef de cabinet right after independence on 30 June 1960, with the agreement of his superiors. He stayed in office when Tshombe declared the independence of the State of Katanga on 11 July.

The deposed and imprisoned Prime Minister of Congo Patrice Lumumba was transferred to Katanga and assassinated on the same day, together with his political allies Joseph Mpolo and Maurice Okito on 17 January 1961. Bartelous declared that Congolese President Joseph Kasa-Vubu asked Tshombe in Brazzaville to transfer Lumumba and that Tshombe's advisers, including Bartelous himself, advised against the proposal. Under the impulse of the so-called "radicals" in the Katangese government (Godefroid Munongo, Jean-Baptiste Kibwe,...), Tshombe finally decided to transfer Lumumba to Katanga, according to Bartelous. He only knew about the assassination on 18 January, he declared, because Etienne Ugeux, Chef de cabinet of Secretary of State for Information Lucas Samalenge, told him about it. Bartelous has always denied any involvement in the assassination, and denied having any contact with the authorities in Brussels. A telegram, dated 6 October, from Minister of African Affairs Harold Charles d'Aspremont Lynden to head of the Belgian technical mission in Élisabethville Robert Rothschild about the "élimination définitive" of Lumumba, however, included the annotation "Bartelous will talk about it with Tshombe". Bartelous responded to the Belgian parliamentary inquiry about the assassination that "definitive elimination" should not be interpreted as a physical elimination.

== Later life ==
Bartelous has talked multiple times about his experience at the time of Lumumba's assassination. In 1987, for instance, he was interviewed by Jacques Brassinne, Belgian former civil servant in Katanga, in the context of Brassinne's PhD dissertation about the death of Lumumba. He was heard during the Belgian parliamentary inquiry into the death of Lumumba in 2001. In 2011, Lumumba's oldest son brought a complaint against ten Belgian nationals suspected of involvement in Lumumba's assassination, including Bartelous.

== Honours ==
- Belgium: Commander of the Order of the Crown
- Rwanda: Officer of the National Order of Rwanda
- Belgium: Medal of the Veterans of King Leopold III of Belgium
- US: US European medal
- Belgium: Commemorative Medal of the 1940–1945 War With Crossed Sabres
