= Carlo Huyghé =

Belgian colonial civil servant

Charles "Carlo" Huyghé

Chef de cabinet of Joseph Yav
- President: Moïse Tshombe

Personal details
- Born: Charles Corneille Gabriel Huyghé; 11 March 1923 Etterbeek, Belgium
- Died: 27 December 2016 (aged 93) South Africa

Charles Corneille Gabriel 'Carlo' Huyghé (11 March 1923 – 27 December 2016) was a Belgian national who served in the Belgium Army (1939-1940), the Belgian Armed Resistance (1941-1943), the Royal Air Force (1943-1945) and the Belgium Colonial Army (Belgian Congo) (1945-1962). During his time in the Belgian Congo he worked at the cabinet of the independent Katangese Secretary of State of National Defense Joseph Yav. His role in the assassination of Congo's first Prime Minister Patrice Lumumba is still the subject of debate.

== Early life and career ==
Huyghé was born to a Walloon father and a Flemish mother. His father served as a senior officer in the Belgian army stationed in Koblenz, Germany in compliance with the Versailles treaty regulations.

Growing up in Germany, Huyghé became fluent in the language and formed close friendships with Germans. However, during World War II, as a young officer in the Belgian army, he was taken prisoner by the advancing German forces during the Blitzkrieg in Belgium and France. This led to his capture and detention as a POW in a camp near Koblenz.

Due to his proficiency in German, Huyghé was granted certain privileges that allowed him some freedom of movement. He seized the opportunity to escape and sought refuge with an old German family friend. Aware of the risks of harboring a POW under Nazi rule, the family provided him with money and suggested that he board a train bound for Belgium and attempt to escape from there.

In the early hours of the morning, Huyghé boarded a train at the Koblenz station, believing it was headed for Liege in Belgium. He waited in a compartment for other passengers to board, only to realize that it was a troop train transporting an SS Battalion to Liege. Two SS Officers joined him in his compartment during the journey. Using his fluency in German and claiming to be a migrant worker, Huyghé won the officers' favor, who shared their rations and Schnapps with him. The standard train and papers searches that would have exposed him as an escapee from a POW camp were not conducted on an SS troop train, and Huyghé safely reached Liege.

Following his arrival in Liege, Huyghé joined the Belgian resistance and fought against the German occupation for the next few years. Eventually, he escaped to Britain and joined the RAF, serving as a tail gunner on Lancaster bombers.

== Career ==
Huyghé moved to the Belgian Congo in 1945, where he worked for the Belgian colonial administration for almost twenty years. In March 1960, he was called to install a special unit for intervention at the European volunteers' corps. At the time of Katanga's declaration of independence by Moïse Tshombe in July 1960, Katangese Interior Minister Godefroid Munongo's Chef de cabinet Victor Tignée appointed Huyghé as his deputy Chef de cabinet. In October 1960, the Secretariats were created, which enlarged the government. Hugyhé became the deputy Chef de cabinet of Secretary of State of National Defense Joseph Yav, family member of Tshombe. He was involved in the procurement of weaponry for Katanga. According to a United Nations report in the wake of the arrests of thirty mercenaries apprehended in Kabalo on 7 April 1961, Huyghé led a recruitment office for mercenaries for Katanga in Johannesburg, South Africa, together with Roderick Russell Cargill. In August 1961, Huyghé received an expulsion order and left for Paris, but became Chef de cabinet of Yav, replacing colonel Grandjean, in November. He stayed in Katanga until the end of 1962.

=== Involvement in Lumumba's murder ===
According to the United Nations Commission of Investigation into the deaths of Patrice Lumumba, Maurice Mpolo, and Joseph Okito, a "great deal of suspicion is cast" on Huyghé, "as being the actual perpetrator of Mr. Lumumba's murder", with Captain Julien Gat accessory to the crime.

== Later life ==
Huyghé moved to South Africa after the end of the Katangese secession in 1963. He lived in Craighall on the outskirts of Johannesburg. He played an important role in the Western community in the country, occupying several positions in the social life of Johannesburg, such as President of the Union of Francophone Belgians Abroad and President of the Belgian Business Association.

== Honours ==
- Belgium: Knight of the Order of Leopold (2002)
- Belgium: Officer of the Order of Leopold (2009)
