= Jacques Masangu =

Congolese and Katangese politician and diplomat

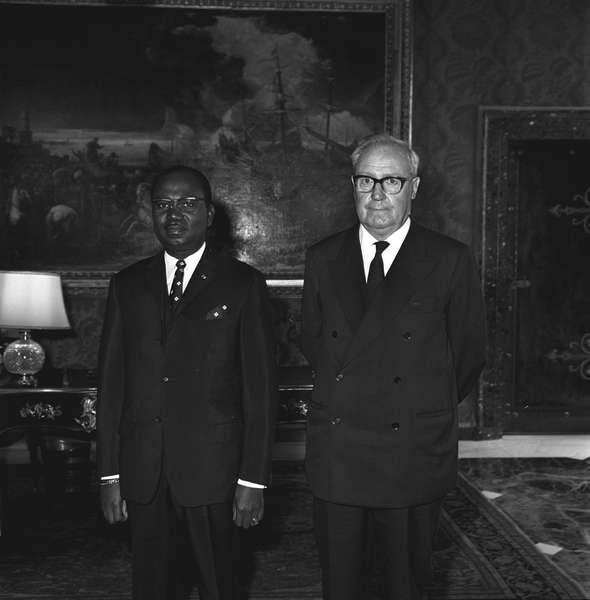
- Jacques Masangu (left) presenting his credentials to Italian President Giuseppe Saragat, 17 October 1969

First Vice-President of the Congolese Senate
- In office 30 June 1960 – July 1961
- President: Joseph Kasavubu

Resident Minister of the State of Katanga to the European Economic Community in Brussels
- In office October 1960 – 7 April 1962
- President: Moïse Tshombe

Personal details
- Born: November 20, 1928 (age 97) Kipushi, Belgian Congo
- Party: BALUBAKAT

Jacques Masangu-a-Mwanza (born 20 November 1928) is a Congolese and Katangese politician and diplomat.

== Early career ==
Jacques Masangu, originating from Katanga, attended the Solvay Institute of the Université Libre de Bruxelles where he graduated in sociology and diplomatic law in 1960.

Masangu was elected a Senator in the national Senate at the time of independence on 30 June 1960. He became the First Vice-president of the Congolese Senate in Léopoldville, the country's capital, on 22 June 1960. He won the election for First Vice-president with 40 votes (51%) against Michel Denge who obtained 37 votes (48%) and Joseph Okito who obtained 1 vote (1%).

== State of Katanga ==
On 11 July 1960, Katangese provincial president Moïse Tshombe declared the mineral-rich province independent as the State of Katanga. On 15 July, Masangu rallied to Tshombe's side and was sent out to Brussels, capital of the former colonising country Belgium, to represent the new state as the Resident Minister of the State of Katanga to the European Economic Community. The office was named the Permanent Delegation to the European Common Market.

In March 1961, mediation efforts between Léopoldville and Élisabethville were undertaken by Malagasy President Philibert Tsiranana. Joseph Kasa-Vubu, Joseph Iléo and Cyrille Adoula of the central authorities met with the Katangese authorities in the Malagasy capital Antananarivo. The outcomes were favourable to the Katangese side. When the Katangese armed troops took the city of Manono the same month, Tshombe was at the height of his glory. A follow-up conference to the Antananarivo conference was planned in Coquilhatville in April-Mai 1961. Masangu warned Tshombe about the possible dangers of going to the city in hostile territory. At the conference, Tshombe and Katangese Minister for Foreign Affairs Évariste Kimba were arrested by the Léopoldville authorities. Masangu and his Paris-based colleague Dominique Diur convened in Milan with Joseph Iléo, Mario Cardoso, and Julien Kasongo, representatives of the central government, to obtain Tshombe's and Kimba's release.

After the reestablishment of diplomatic ties between Léopoldville and Brussels, the Belgian government requested the Katangese office in Brussels to close its doors. The office in Brussels closed on 26 January 1962 and was replaced by the Cultural and Economic Office of Katanga. On 7 April 1962, Masangu resigned and was replaced by Odilon Mwenda. In December 1962, he moved back to Léopoldville as a Senator for the central government. Back at the service of the Léopoldville government, Masangu moved to Washington, D.C. as a Minister Counselor for Congo, where he only stayed for two months.

== Diplomatic and commercial career ==
In 1963, Masangu was appointed as a Deputy Prime Minister charged with social affairs in the government of Cyrille Adoula and, in that capacity, attended the State funeral of John F. Kennedy. His Chef de Cabinet, Oscar Mudiay, was later appointed by the Léopoldville government as a special commissioner charged with the installation of institutions in Northern Katanga. During the period of different crises within the Balubakat party in 1963–1964, Masangu played an important role in their settlement as a prominent member of the party at the central government.

From 1966 to 1977, he held several diplomatic positions. As the ambassador to the German Federal Republic, Masangu attended the state funeral of West German Chancellor Konrad Adenauer. Tshombe, then sentenced to death in absentia and living in exile in Madrid, Francoist Spain, had the opportunity to sign Adenauer's book of condolence at the West German embassy in Madrid. As a result, Masangu was recalled to Congo on 17 May 1967. Later, Masangu became the representative to the IAEA in Vienna, ambassador to Italy and representative to the FAO. He presented his credentials to Italian president Giuseppe Saragat on 17 October 1969. During his time in Italy, Congolese President Mobutu Sese Seko appointed him as the chairman of the board of directors of Air Congo. Regarding the appointment, Congolese newspaper L'étoile commented that Mobutu "has shown appreciation for worthy efforts of Congolese diplomats abroad." Afterwards, Masangu was appointed ambassador to Switzerland. Masangu ended his diplomatic career in The Hague, where he was Congo's ambassador to the Netherlands, agent at the International Court of Justice (ICJ), and member of the board of directors of the Permanent Court of Arbitration. He represented his country at the precedent-setting case by the ICJ about Abdoulaye Yerodia Ndombasi. In Congo, he was president of the Board of Directors of the Société Financière de Développement (SOFIDE). Masangu founded Lubumbashi-based radio and television outlet Kyondo Radio Télévision in 2011 and supported the organisation after a fire in 2019.

== Personal life ==
Jacques Masangu is the father of Jean-Claude Masangu Mulongo, former governor of the Central Bank of Congo. Furthermore, the brother of Jacques Masangu's spouse, Roger Kabulo, was the Chef de Cabinet of Balubakat politician Jason Sendwe.

== Bibliography ==
- Jacques Masangu (2004). Le Katanga, que veut-il? Mémoires d'un Ambassadeur. Institut Congolais de Recherche en Développement et Etudes Stratégiques (ICREDES).
