= Constitution of Katanga =

Constitution of the State of Katanga (French: Constitution de l'Etat du Katanga)
- Coat of arms of Katanga

Overview
- Jurisdiction: State of Katanga
- Created: 5 August 1960
- System: Republic
- Chambers: Unicameral
- Executive: President
- Judiciary: Court of appeal, lower court, police court, customary courts
- Citation: Constitution of the State of Katanga, 2010 or Constitution of the State of Katanga, 2009-05-29
- Commissioned by: The Katangese Assembly serving as Constitutional Assembly
- Author(s): René Clémens and his team (René Grosjean, Pol Évrard and, in particular, André Massart)
- Signatories: Moïse Tshombe, Godefroid Munongo, Cléophas Mukeba, Paul Muhona

The Constitution of the State of Katanga was the constitution of the State of Katanga, an unrecognised secessionist state which proclaimed its independence from the Republic of the Congo (Léopoldville) on 11 July 1960. Katanga became independent eleven days after the Congo gained its independence from Belgium. The constitution was drafted by René Clémens and his team. Clémens, law professor at the University of Liège, was a personal friend of the self-declared president of Katanga, Moïse Tshombe, and collaborator of the Belgian Minister of African Affairs Harold d'Aspremont Lynden. His team consisted of René Grosjean, Pol Évrard, and André Massart.

The constitution was never really put into effect, since the state of emergency, although only decreed from October 1960, was in fact implemented since July 1960. The document, which consisted of 66 articles, set out the political structure of Katanga and the rights of its citizens. The President, for instance, held the executive power and was both the head of state and head of the government. He was elected by a two-third majority by the national assembly and the great council (French: Grand Conseil) held in congress, for a renewable mandate of four years. He is the guarantor of Katanga's national independence, the integrity of the territory, the respect of the treaties, and the international agreements. He is the supreme commander of the armed forces, safeguards the constitution and ensures the continuity of the state.
