= Frédéric Vandewalle =

Belgian military personnel (1912–1994)

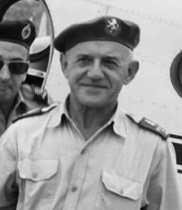
- Born: Frédéric Vandewalle; July 7, 1912; Arlon, Belgium
- Died: 5 November 1994 (aged 82); Anderlecht, Brussels, Belgium
- Military career
- Allegiance: Belgian Congo; DR Congo
- Service years: 1937–1967
- Rank: Colonel
- Units: (Belgian Congo) Force Publique (Democratic Republic of the Congo) Congolese National Army
- Conflicts: Second World War; Congo Crisis; Simba rebellion; Operation Dragon Rouge

Signature
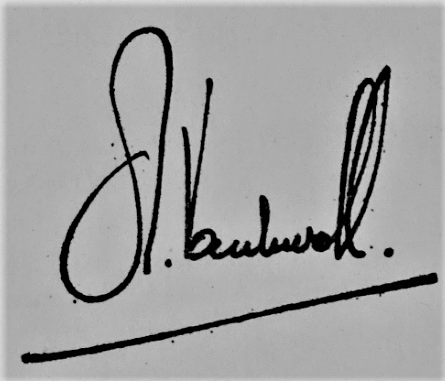

Frédéric Vandewalle (5 July 1912 – 5 November 1994) was a Belgian military officer, mercenary and politician. An influential figure during the Congo's pre- and post-independence period, he was one of the organisers of the Katangese secession and led Operation Ommegang against the Simba rebellion during the Congo Crisis. His precise role in the assassination of Patrice Lumumba is the subject of debate among historians.

== Career ==
Vandewalle joined the colonial forces called Force Publique in 1937, where he served for two decades and raised to the rank of colonel. He was the head of the state security forces in the Belgian Congo from 1957 to early 1960. After independence, he was sent to Katanga's capital Elisabethville in January 1961, where he helped to organise the Katangese secession from Congo. As a member of the inner circle of Katanga's president Moïse Tshombe he was an influential Belgian in the unrecognised country. There is, however, no full clarity regarding his role in the assassination of Patrice Lumumba, Maurice Mpolo, and Joseph Okito. Shortly after the murders, Vandewalle officially became the commander of the Katangese Gendarmerie, the security forces, probably to prevent that the French mercenary Roger Trinquier would take up that position. He immediately succeeded in defeating the Balubakat uprising. On 17 October, he became the Belgian consul, thereby replacing Henri Créner.

After the end of the secession, Vandewalle returned to Belgium in March 1963, where he was received by King Baudouin. In 1964, Tshombe returned from exile in Francoist Spain to become the prime minister of the reunified Congo under president Joseph Kasa-Vubu. The Congolese National Army (Armée nationale congolaise, ANC) could not control the security situation in the country, particularly with regard to the Simba rebellion in the east. On 5 August 1964, Stanleyville was captured by the rebel forces. The same day, Belgian Minister of Foreign Affairs Paul-Henri Spaak received a personal letter from Tshombe, requesting the return of Vandewalle as his personal military adviser. On 7 August, the colonel left for Congo to become the personal adviser of prime minister Tshombe. He received the order on 28 August to reconquer the rebellious region (with the approval of general Joseph-Désiré Mobutu) and could make use of foreign troops, including Cuban exiles sponsored by the Central Intelligence Agency (CIA) and Belgian military staff, and the approximately 350 white mercenaries of Mike Hoare. Vandewalle's new unit, the 5th Mechanised Brigade, was created in Kamina. and commanded by 65 Belgian officers of the former Force Publique. He also provided 65 Congolese officers and non-commissioned officers, called paravents, next to a few thousand soldiers of the ANC. The Americans and Belgians armed the forces, but did not provide the promised transport planes. Instead, Vandewalle's troops used abandoned UN armoured vehicles and lorries bought at George Arthur Forrest. The brigade reached Stanleyville during a coordinated action with the US-Belgian Operation Dragon Rouge. After this victory, Vandewalle's unit took the rest of the Simba-controlled areas as well.

Vandewalle was severely injured in 1966 in a car crash where his wife died. He recovered and started to extensively write about his Congolese experiences. He also appeared on television: RTBF-journalist Henri-François Van Aal dedicated an episode of Télé-mémoires congolaises to an interview with him (1970). At the Centre for Historical Research and Documentation on War and Contemporary Society, he also gave an interview. Vandewalle wrote his memoirs Mille et quatre jours about the Katangese period down in 13 fascicles, published in small numbers. He had at his disposal the papers of chief of staff Jacques Bartelous and consul Henri Créner, that he took with him from Congo to Belgium. According to Ludo De Witte, the memoirs exhibit great candidness because they are written at a time of neocolonial victory feeling. On the other hand, the experts of the Belgian parliamentary inquiry into the murder of Lumumba did not attach great importance to the memoirs because Vandewalle was not as informed as he intimated, according to the experts. At some crucial passages in Mille et quatre jours, he made curious mistakes.

Vandewalle's personal papers are kept at the Royal Museum for Central Africa in Tervuren, Belgium.

== Publications ==
- "Les mutineries au Congo Belge", in: Zaïre, 1947, nr. 5, p. 487-514
- "Deuxième note au sujet des mutineries au Congo Belge", in: Zaïre, 1948, nr. 2, p. 905-906
- Congo 1960-1964. Conférence donnée à Arlon le 6 juin 1968 à l'Ecole d'infanterie, 1968
- L'Ommegang. Odyssée et reconquête de Stanleyville, 1964. Témoignage africain, 1970
- Les Rapports secrets de la Sûreté congolaise (1959-1960), 1973, 2 parts (with Jacques Brassinne de La Buissière).
- Mille et quatre jours. Contes du Zaïre et du Shaba, 1975–1977, 13 parts.
- Une ténébreuse affaire, ou Roger Trinquier au Katanga, 1979.
- "A propos de la gendarmerie katangaise" in: Bulletin trimestriel du CRAOCA, 1987, nr. 1, p. 65-92

== Literature ==
- "In memoriam Frédéric Vandewalle", in: Annales Aequatoria, 1995, nr. 16, p. 618
- Frédéric Vanderwalle Papers, AfricaMuseum
