= Ugeux =

Ugeux is a surname. Notable people with the surname include:

- Etienne Ugeux (1923 – 1998), Belgian journalist
- Georges Ugeux (born 1945), Belgian banker
- Pierre Ugeux (1914–2009), Belgian motorsport person
- Sébastien Ugeux (born 1970), Belgian race car driver
- William Ugeux (1909–1997), Belgian writer
