= Joseph Kiwele =

Congolese musician and politician (1912–1961)

- President: Moïse Tshombe

Minister of National Education of the State of Katanga

Personal details
- Born: August 1912; Mpala, Baudouinville, Belgian Congo
- Died: 14 November 1961 (aged 49); Élisabethville, Katanga
- Political party: Union congolaise, CONAKAT

Joseph Kiwele (August 1912 – 14 November 1961) was a Congolese and Katangese musician and politician. He was Katanga's Minister of National Education and author of the state's national anthem, La Katangaise.

== Early life ==
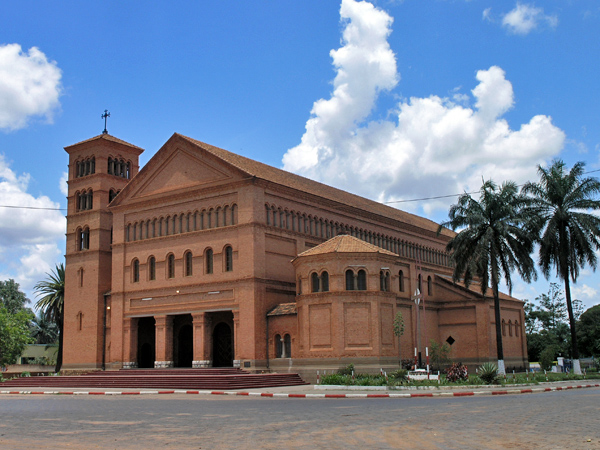
Sts. Peter and Paul Cathedral in current-day Lubumbashi, where Kiwele was an organist.

Kiwele was born in August 1912, in Mpala, near Baudouinville at the shores of Lake Tanganyika on the side of the Belgian Congo. The son of a catechist of the Mpala mission, he went to primary school in his native town, before going to the small seminary of Lusaka in 1926, then to the major seminary of Baudouinville for his philosophy and theology studies. In Lusaka, he was first introduced to Western-style composing and in 1934, he authored his first compositions. In Élisabethville, he replaced an organist who fell ill. Struck by his musical gifts, Benedictine father Anschaire Lamoral gave Kiwele the permanent position of organist at the Sts. Peter and Paul Cathedral of Élisabethville, and as a maths, sciences and music instructor at the St. Boniface school. Kiwele conducted Lamoral's boys' choir Croix de cuivre (Copper cross). At that time, he was considered one of the greatest African composers. In 1956, Monseigneur Jean-Félix de Hemptinne sent Kiwele to the Royal Conservatory of Liège in Belgium. When he returned to Élisabethville, he founded, with the help of the city's music school, another music school, but for Congolese people.

== Political career ==
Before independence from Belgium, Kiwele was a member of the UMHK-backed Union congolaise. With his party's delegation, he participated at the Luluabourg conference in 1959. When Congo gained its independence from Belgium, Kiwele was elected as a provincial MP for the Baudouinville territory, now on a list of CONAKAT, political party of Moïse Tshombe and Godefroid Munongo. Eleven days after Congo's independence, Tshombe declared the independence of Katanga from the Congo. Kiwele became the Minister of National Education in the government of the new State of Katanga. Like all Katangese government Ministers, he had a Belgian chef de cabinet, in his case Marcel Petit. Kiwele composed the national anthem for the state, called La katangaise ("The Katangan"), in 1960. When Tshombe and Minister of Foreign Affairs Évariste Kimba were arrested at the Conference of Coquilhatville at the end of August 1961, Kiwele formed a triumvirate with Munongo and Finance Minister Jean-Baptiste Kibwe to temporarily replace Tshombe at the helm of the country.

Joseph Kiwele died in Élisabethville on 14 November 1961, aged 49, of a brain thrombosis.

== Legacy ==
- Kiwele is mostly remembered for his career as a musician and composer. Besides his mastering of works of the European composers such as Beethoven, Händel, and Mozart, he authored many works in a more African tradition, such as his Missa Katanga. Te Deum Bantou is Kiwele's own arrangement of Händel's Messiah, for organ and African instruments. On the occasion of the Belgian king Baudouin's visit to the Belgian colony in 1955, he wrote the Hymne à la Belgique.
- Congolese artist Sammy Baloji used choir arrangements in his video Tales of the Copper Cross Garden: Episode 1.
- The Royal Atheneum of Élisabethville was renamed Lycée Joseph Kiwele in his honour.
