= Paul Muhona =

Paul Muhona Lumbu Mukangana Ndjamba

Minister of Work and Social Affairs of the State of Katanga

Personal details
- Born: 12 May 1934; Luashi, Dilolo, Belgian Congo
- Died: 15 March 1985 (aged 50); Brussels, Belgium

Paul Muhona Lumbu Mukangana Ndjamba was a Congolese and Katangese politician.

== Early life ==
Muhona was born on 12 May 1934 as the son of André Muhona, a Chokwe, and Sompo Thérèse, a Lunda.

== Independent Congo and Katangese secession ==
On 16 June 1960, right before Congolese independence from Belgium, the Provincial Assembly of the Katanga Province elected Muhona as a Minister for Public Health, before becoming Minister for Work and Social Affairs. Eleven days after Congolese independence from Belgium, on 11 July 1960, President of the Provincial Assembly Moïse Tshombe declared the independence of the State of Katanga. Muhona became Minister for Work and Social Affairs. His Chef de cabinet was Raymond Deghilage and deputy Chef de cabinet was Christophe Kolongo. After the death of the eldest member of the Katangese government, Joseph Kiwele, Muhona also took over his portfolio as Minister for Education and Cultural Affairs, Youth, and Sports, until the end of the Katangese secession in January 1963.

Next to his ministerial functions, he was a professor of constitutional law at the Institute for Advanced Social Studies of Elisabethville, professor of sociology at the Centre for the Training of Administrative Cadres, as well as President of the Board of Administrators of the Official University of Congo in Elisabethville.

== After the end of the Katangese secession ==
After the end of the Katangese secession, Muhona became a member of the Constitutional Commission of Luluabourg where he presented the new Lualaba Province. In that province, he later became a provincial Minister for Work and Social Affairs, Youth, Sports, Education and Culture. When the Lualaba province was reunited again with Katanga-Oriental to form the South Katanga, he became Minister of Public Works, later of Public Health.

In 1968, Muhona became the governor of Kasai-Occidental

== Personal life and death ==
Paul Muhona married Béatrice Bibombe (Zairianised: Bibombe Kadiyoyo). The couple had eight children.

== Honors ==
- Grand Officer of the Order of the Leopard
- Officer of the Order of La Pléiade
