= La Katangaise =

National anthem of Katanga

English: "The Katangese"
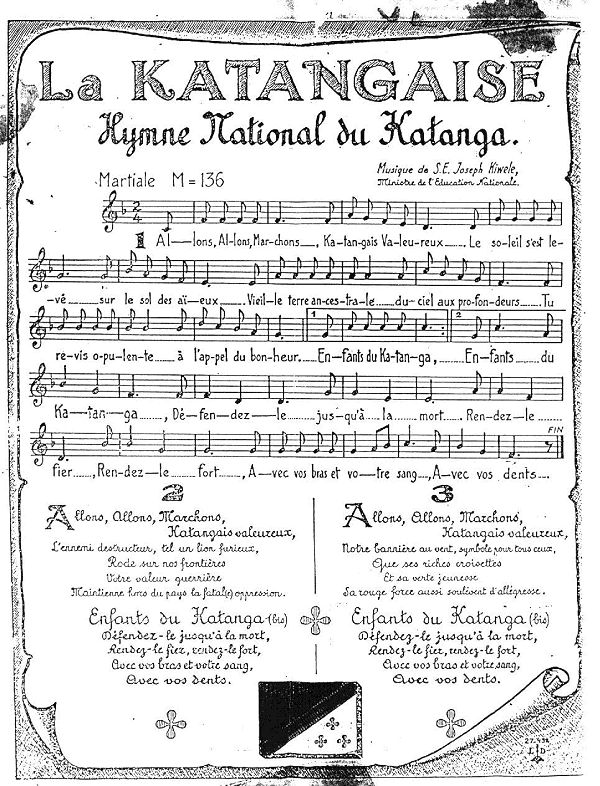
- Sheet music for La Katangaise
- National anthem of Katanga
- Lyrics: unknown
- Music: Joseph Kiwele
- Adopted: 1960
- Relinquished: 1963
- Succeeded by: "Debout Congolais"

Audio sample
- "La Katangaise": file; help

La Katangaise ("The Katangese") was the national anthem of the State of Katanga. The music was composed by Joseph Kiwele, who was Katanga's Minister of National Education. After the State of Katanga was dissolved in 1963 and integrated into the Democratic Republic of the Congo, a new anthem was adopted.

== Lyrics ==
French original

Allons, allons, marchons, Katangais valeureux.
Le soleil s’est levé sur le sol des aïeux
Vieille terre ancestrale du ciel aux profondeurs.
Tu revis opulente à l’appel du bonheur

Refrain :
Enfants du Katanga
Défendez le jusqu’à la mort
Rendez le fier rendez le fort
Avec vos bras et votre sang
Avec vos dents

Allons, allons, marchons, Katangais valeureux.
Le soleil s’est levé sur le sol des aïeux
Vieille terre ancestrale du ciel aux profondeurs.
Tu revis opulente à l’appel du bonheur

Refrain

Allons, allons, marchons, Katangais valeureux.
L’ennemi destructeur, tel un lion furieux.
Rôde sur nos frontières
Votre valeur guerrière
Maintienne hors du pays la fatale oppression

Refrain

Allons, allons, marchons, Katangais valeureux.
L’ennemi destructeur, tel un lion furieux.
Rôde sur nos frontières
Votre valeur guerrière
Maintienne hors du pays la fatale oppression

Refrain

Allons, allons, marchons, Katangais valeureux.
Notre bannière au vent, symbole pour tous ceux
Que ses riches croisettes
Et sa verte jeunesse
Sa rouge force aussi soulèvent d’allégresse

Refrain

Allons, allons, marchons, Katangais valeureux.
Notre bannière au vent, symbole pour tous ceux
Que ses riches croisettes
Et sa verte jeunesse
Sa rouge force aussi soulèvent d’allégresse

Refrain

English translation

Come, come, let's march, valorous Katangese.
The sun rose on the soil of your ancestors
O old ancestral land, from her skies to her depths.
You live again, prosperous, at happiness' call

Chorus:
Children of Katanga
Defend her until death comes
Make her proud, and make her strong
With own your arms and your own blood
With own your teeth

Come, come, let's march, valorous Katangese.
The sun rose on the soil of your ancestors
O old ancestral land, from her skies to her depths.
You live again, prosperous, at happiness' call

Chorus

Come, come, let's march, valorous Katangese.
The destructive enemy, like a furious lion.
Lurks on our borders
Your warlike valour
Keeps out of the country this fatal oppression

Chorus

Come, come, let's march, valorous Katangese.
The destructive enemy, like a furious lion.
Lurks on our borders
Your warlike valour
Keeps out of the country this fatal oppression

Chorus

Come, come, let's march, valorous Katangese.
Our banner in the wind, a symbol for all those
May her rich croisettes
And her youth, green
As well as her strength, red, make all rise with joy

Chorus

Come, come, let's march, valorous Katangese.
Our banner in the wind, a symbol for all those
May her rich croisettes
And her youth, green
As well as her strength, red, make all rise with joy

Chorus
