= Albert Nyembo =

Politician of the Democratic Republic of the Congo (born 1929)

Secretary of State of National Defense of Congo-Léopoldville
- In office June 1960 – ?

Secretary of State of Public Service of the State of Katanga
- In office October 1960 – 21 January 1963 (end of the secession)

Minister of National Economy of Congo-Léopoldville
- In office 1965–1967

Personal details
- Born: 30 May 1929
- Party: Confédération des associations tribales du Katanga

Albert Nyembo Mwana-Ngongo (born 30 May 1929) is a Congolese and Katangese politician who was a Secretary of State and Minister for Congo and secessionist Katanga.

== Early life ==
Nyembo went to school at the St. Boniface Institute in Élisabethville, capital of Katanga, then in the Belgian Congo. He obtained a degree from the school of telecommunication in Léopoldville, the colony's capital, in 1950. Before 1960, he was a civil servant and trade unionist in the Belgian Congo. In 1957, Nyembo founded the CONAKAT party together with Godefroid Munongo, Évariste Kimba, and Rodolphe Yav. This occurred within a context of anti-Kasaï sentiments. Nyembo was the President of a group of Hemba people from Kongolo, Assobako, which went on to adhere to CONAKAT.

== Career ==
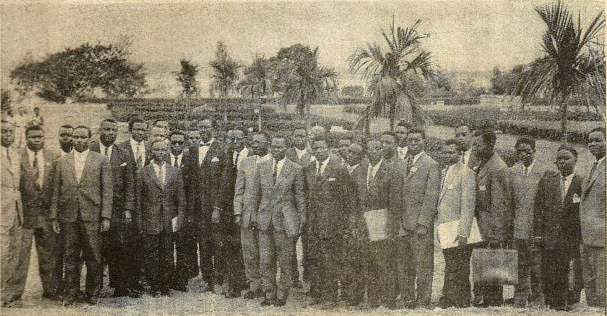
First Lumumba government, as published in Le Courrier d’Afrique

During the communal election organised before independence, he was elected as a municipal councilor and member of the Élisabethville council. In 1960, he was elected as a national MP for the Tanganyika constituency. He was appointed Secretary of State for National Defense as a CONAKAT party member in the Lumumba Government. He was a Secretary of State, since the portfolio of National Defense was added to the Prime Minister's.

Eleven days after Congo's independence, Moïse Tshombe declared the independence of the State of Katanga. Nyembo resigned from his position in the central government and became the Secretary of State of Public Service for the Katangese regime, his deputy chef de cabinet was Léonard Ilunga. At the start of the secession, four delegations were sent out to explain the government's point of view. The second delegation, led by Minister of Foreign Affairs Évariste Kimba, included Nyembo, Gabriel Kitenge, Cyprien Kayumba Mfumu wa Bwana, Léonard Kanyangala, and an ordinance officer, and left for Europe at the start of August.

After the secession ended, he was appointed Minister of National Economy in the Cyrille Adoula government of the reunified Congo. In 1965, he became a national MP for Tanganyika.

Nyembo was also active as a manager, as a President of the Compagnie du chemin de fer du Congo supérieur aux Grands Lacs africains in 1964 and President of Brasseries du Katanga in 1973. During the national elections for the Bureau politique (political office) in 1970, he was elected a political commissioner for the Shaba region. He served for the Bureau politique of the sole party Popular Movement of the Revolution (MPR) from 22 November 1977 to 18 February 1981. He was a member of the Central Committee of MPR since the announcement of its composition on 2 September 1980. He was President of the Financial and Economic Commission from the beginning until March 1984. His mandate at the Central Committee was renewed on 28 January 1985.

== Honours ==
- Zaire: Commander of the National Order of the Leopard

== Works cited ==
- Hoskyns, Catherine (1965). The Congo Since Independence: January 1960 – December 1961. London: Oxford University Press. OCLC 414961.
