= Dominique Diur =

Congolese politician

- Bust of Diur by Alfred Liyolo at Dominique Diur omnisport stadium in Kolwezi

Governor of the Lualaba Province
- In office 23 September 1963 – 2 April 1966
- President: Joseph Kasavubu; Joseph-Désiré Mobutu

Resident Minister of the State of Katanga in France
- In office December 1960 – ?
- President: Moïse Tshombe

Personal details
- Born: 1929 Kamulemba, Sandoa Territory, Katanga, Belgian Congo
- Died: 1980 (aged 50–51) Lubumbashi
- Party: CONAKAT

Dominique Diur (1929—1980) was a Congolese and Katangese politician who was one of the founders of the CONAKAT party.

== Early life ==
Diur grew up in the Belgian Congo. His father was a dignitary of the chieftaincy of Kayembe Mukulu. He followed his primary education at the Catholic mission of Sandoa, he then continued to the Franciscan small seminary of Luabo, and later the Scheut major seminary of Kabue, Kasai. He followed advanced education in law at the Benedictines in Élisabethville. After his studies, he followed an internship at the Belgian Ministry of Justice. Diur started his professional career at the Belgian Congo Radio in Élisabethville, before working at the local court (Juridiction indigène). He was elected as a municipal councillor for the Élisabethville commune of Kenya in 1957 and reelected in 1959. Diur was a member of Gassomel (Groupement des associations mutuelles de l'Empire Lunda), a Lunda organisation. In 1958, a group of young évolués with an anti-Kasaian mindset including Diur, Évariste Kimba, Albert Nyembo, and Godefroid Munongo, grouped together to form CONAKAT. The first meeting leading to the creation of Conakat took place at Diur's house. The statutes were also drafted at his house.

== State of Katanga ==
Congo became independent on 30 June 1960. Eleven days later, Katanga's governor Moïse Tshombe declared the independence of the State of Katanga from the mainland. Diur became the chef de cabinet of Katangese Minister of Justice Valentin Ilunga. Diur applied for the position of Katangese Minister for Foreign Affairs, but Kimba was chosen instead. Godefroid Munongo namely opposed his nomination.

In December 1960, Diur attended an anti-communist conference, organised by Suzanne Labin, at the NATO headquarters in Paris, France. He stayed in the city to establish the permanent delegation of Katanga in France on Avenue Georges Mandel, not far from NATO and the Eiffel Tower. The appointment came at a time when Katanga sought to intensify its ties with France. French Prime Minister Michel Debré sent out SDECE officer François Bistos to Élisabethville, and accepted an official visit by Diur.

== Lualaba Province ==
On 28 May 1963, after the end of the Katangese secession, Diur was thrown in jail by Godefroid Munongo on charges of misappropriating public funds, but released by the new Interior Minister. At the time of his release, he ran for President of the Lualaba Province against Moïse Tshombe's brother Thomas. He was elected as the President, from 1965 the governor, of the province. He held office from 23 September 1963 until 24 April 1966. During his time as the provincial governor, the construction of an omnisport stadium began in the province's capital Kolwezi.

== Later life ==
In April 1966, the Lualaba province was merged with Katanga Oriental into one province of South Katanga. Diur's rival Godefroid Munongo became its governor, with Diur as vice-governor. When intelligence reports (and a series of articles in Jeune Afrique) showed that a mercenary training camp, favourable to the exiled Tshombe, existed in the Ardèche, France, Munongo and Diur were suspended. Munongo was thrown in jail, but Diur was cleared on 25 December 1966. Diur professed his loyalty to new president Joseph-Désiré Mobutu in 1967, as a Provincial Commissioner, but was instead assigned to the Interior Ministry under Minister Etienne Tshisekedi. From there, he would be nominated to the powerful Political Bureau (Bureau politique) of the state party MPR in March 1969. Already towards the end of 1970, he had to leave the Bureau. He died in Lubumbashi in 1980.

== Legacy ==
On 26 September 2020, the stadium in Kolwezi was reinaugurated after a long period of dilapidation, as the Stade Dominique Diur, located at the renamed Avenue Dominique Diur. The modernisation of the building was entrusted to a subsidiary of the Forrest Group.
