= State of Katanga =

1960–1963 breakaway state in Africa

Coordinates: 11°08′S 27°06′E

State of Katanga: État du Katanga (French); Inchi Ya Katanga (Swahili)
- 1960–1963
- Flag Coat of arms
- Motto: "Force, espoir et paix dans la prospérité" "Power, hope and peace in prosperity"
- Anthem: "La Katangaise"
- Katanga in green (1961)
- Status: Unrecognized state
- Capital and largest city: Élisabethville
- Languages: French; Swahili
- Demonyms: Katangese; Katangan
- Government: Assembly-independent republic
- President
  - 1960–1963: Moïse Tshombe
- Vice-president
  - 1960–1963: Jean-Baptiste Kibwe
- Legislature: National Assembly
- Historical era: Congo Crisis
  - Katanga secession: 11 July 1960
  - South Kasai secession: 8 August 1960
  - Dissolution: 21 January 1963

Area
  - Total: 496,871 km^{2} (191,843 sq mi)

Population
  - 1960 estimate: 1,700,000
- Currency: Katangese franc
- Time zone: UTC+2 (CAT)
| Preceded by | Succeeded by |
| Congo-Léopoldville | Congo-Léopoldville |
- Today part of: Democratic Republic of the Congo

The State of Katanga (French: État du Katanga; Swahili: Inchi Ya Katanga) was a breakaway state encompassing Katanga Province of the Republic of the Congo (Léopoldville). The State of Katanga proclaimed its independence from Congo-Léopoldville on 11 July 1960 under Moïse Tshombe, leader of the local Confédération des associations tribales du Katanga (CONAKAT) political party. The creation of a new Katangese state did not receive support throughout the province and was plagued by ethnic strife in its northernmost region. It was dissolved in 1963 following an invasion by United Nations Operation in the Congo (ONUC) forces, and reintegrated with the rest of the country as Katanga Province.

The Katangese secession was carried out with the support of Union Minière du Haut Katanga, a mining company with concession rights in the region, and a large contingent of Belgian military advisers. The Katanga Gendarmerie, an army raised by the Tshombe government, was initially organised and trained by Belgium's military and consisted of Belgian soldiers as well as mercenaries from Northern Rhodesia and elsewhere. There was a similarly organized Katangese Air Force.

Although the rebellion was conceived as an opposition to Patrice Lumumba's central government, it continued even after the democratically elected prime minister was violently overthrown, leading to Lumumba's own kidnapping and murder inside the breakaway state. After Operation Grandslam, the rebels either scattered or surrendered to United Nations forces in 1963.

== Congo Crisis ==
=== Initial secession ===
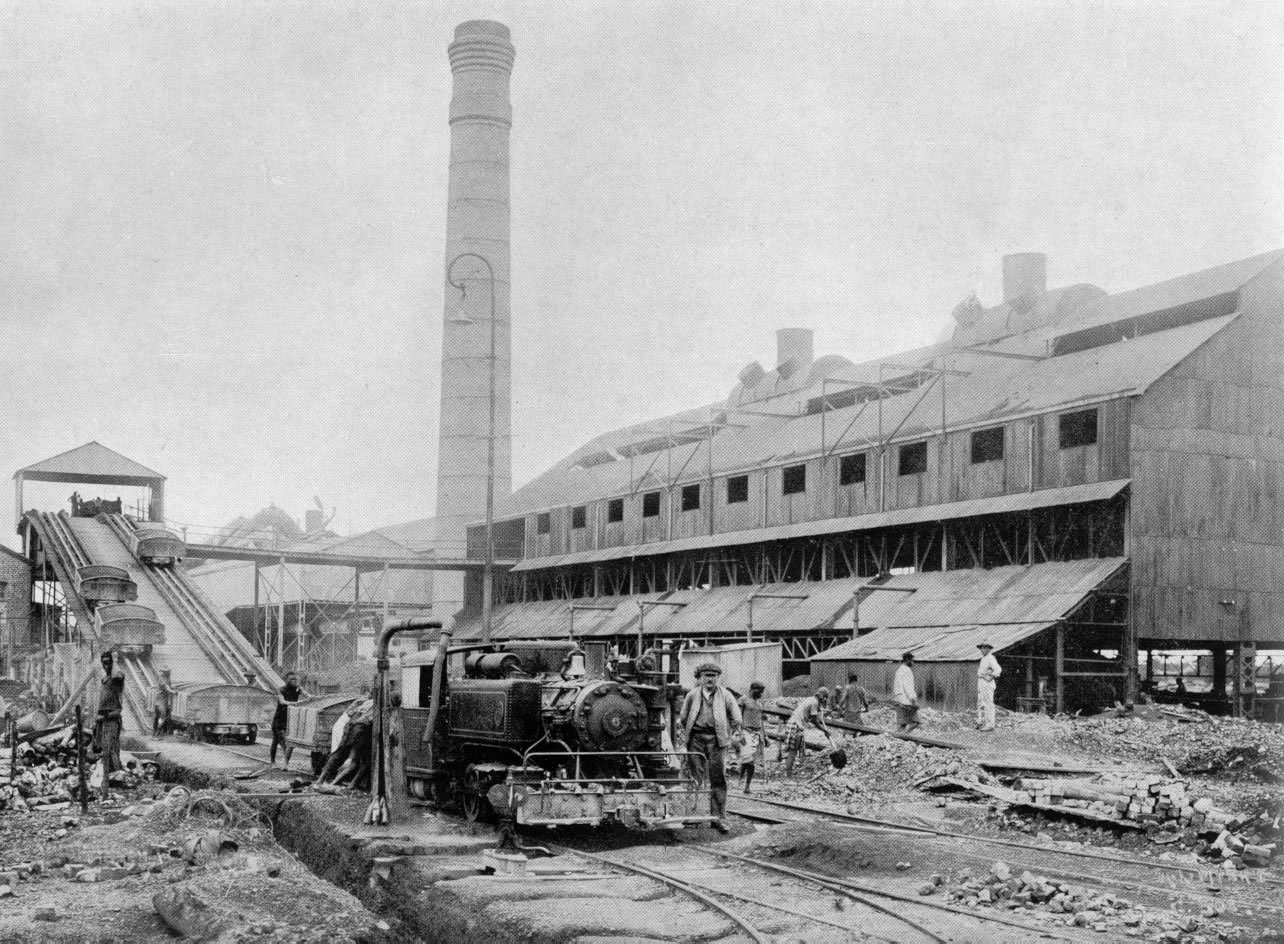
A Union Minière du Haut-Katanga (UMHK) copper mine, pictured in 1917. Katanga's mineral wealth played an important part in the secession.

In 1906, the Union Minière du Haut-Katanga (UMHK) company was founded and was granted the exclusive rights to mine copper in Katanga. The principal shareholders in the Union Minière du Haut-Katanga were Comité Spécial du Katanga, the Société Générale de Belgique and the British Tanganyika Concessions. In turn, the largest shareholder in the Comité Spécial de Katanga was the Belgian state. Katanga was a center of mining with uranium, tin and copper all being extracted from the earth. The wealth drawn by the mining industry had attracted about 32,000 Belgian settlers to Katanga by the 1950s, making it into the province of the Belgian Congo with the largest number of Belgian settlers. As 33.7% of the revenue of the Congo came from the sale of the copper mined in Katanga, ownership of the company was an important consideration for the leaders of the Congolese Independence movement while the Belgian government was most reluctant to give up its share in the UMHK, and did not finally do so until 1967. In January 1959, it was announced that Belgium would grant independence to the Congo in June 1960. Starting in March 1960, the UMHK began to financially support CONAKAT and bribed the party leader, Moïse Tshombe, into advocating policies that were favorable to the company.

Economically, the Katanga province of the Belgian Congo was closely linked to the autonomous Central African Federation that united the British colonies of Northern Rhodesia (modern Zambia), Nyasaland (modern Malawi), and Southern Rhodesia (modern Zimbabwe). Via gerrymandering, much of the black population of the Central African Federation was in effect disfranchised and the Federation was dominated by the white population. In the run-up to the Congolese independence, the leaders of the white Belgian settlers in Katanga were in close contact with the leaders of the white settlers in the Central African Federation, discussing a plan under which Katanga would break away from the Congo once independence was granted, and then join the Central African Federation. In March 1960, Etienne Harford, the Belgian consul in Salisbury told Sir Roy Welensky, the prime minister of the Federation, that the Belgian government wanted a "political association" of Katanga with the federation after independence. The same month in an interview with Rene McColl, a journalist from The Daily Express newspaper, Welensky stated that he fully expected Katanga to break away from the Congo and join the Federation.

When the Belgian Congo received independence from Belgium on 30 June 1960, it was already wracked by ethnic factionalism and political tension. A coalition of CONAKAT politicians and Belgian settlers had made an attempt shortly before that date to issue their own declaration of independence in Katanga, but the Belgian government opposed their plans. CONAKAT was especially concerned that the emerging Congolese government under prime minister Patrice Lumumba would dismiss its members from their positions in the Katangese provincial government and replace them with his supporters.

On the evening of 11 July, CONAKAT leader Tshombe, accusing the central government of communist leanings and dictatorial rule, announced that Katanga was seceding from the Congo. To assist him, the UMHK gave Tshombe an advance of 1,250 million Belgian francs (approximately 25 million US dollars in 1960 – $272,075,000 today). Tshombe's first act was to ask the Belgian Prime Minister, Gaston Eyskens, for help. When the newly appointed commander of the Élisabethville military garrison arrived in the city, Katangese authorities immediately detained and expelled him. He flew to Luluabourg and informed Lumumba and President Joseph Kasa-Vubu of the secession. The two decided to fly to Katanga to examine the situation themselves. Katangese Minister of Interior Godefroid Munongo denied them permission to land at the airport and radioed that while Kasa-Vubu could visit Katanga if he wished, Lumumba was not allowed to enter the territory. Infuriated, they both returned to Luluabourg. Tshombe immediately appointed his own commander, a Colonel Norbert Muke of the Force Publique, to form a new military force, the Katanga Gendarmerie. The gendarmerie was staffed with Belgian officers who were, in effect, seconded to Tshombe as military advisers. On 16 July 1960, Eyskens extended de facto recognition to Katanga and on 22 July created the Mission Technique Belge (Mistebel) to assist Katanga with arms and advisers.

Tshombe and CONAKAT argued that the secession was the result of indigenous nationalist sentiment. However, the Baluba population of the northern districts of the province were actively opposed to independence, and even the population in the south, while generally more sympathetic to Tshombe, was never directly consulted on the matter. Katanga was also home to a disproportionately large white community of Belgian descent, as well as many Belgian expatriates who had invested heavily in the province. For the most part, Katanga's white residents openly backed the secession. Unlike Lumumba, Tshombe had openly courted them, likely because he believed they possessed much needed technical skills, and their exodus would prove catastrophic to the Katangese economy.

Within the Belgian government, King Baudouin was very supportive of Katanga and used all the power of the court to pressure the government into extending diplomatic recognition to Katanga. The Foreign Minister, Pierre Wigny, knowing that the United States was opposed to breaking up the Congo, was against recognizing Katanga. Wigny feared a repeat of the Suez Crisis of 1956 when Britain, France and Israel were all humiliated when the United States opposed their attack on Egypt with the Congo playing the role of Egypt and Belgium the role of the nations that attacked Egypt. For the same reasons, the Belgian representative at NATO, André de Staercke, was opposed to a venture that was likely to anger the United States. Henri Crener, the Belgian consul in Élisabethville, was a fierce supporter of Katanga. Harold Charles d'Aspremont Lynden, the right-hand man to Eyskens and his most influential adviser, was likewise an adamant supporter of Katanga, seeing a chance for Belgium to hold onto the most valuable part of the Congo. Between the pressure from his Foreign Minister to not recognize Katanga vs. the pressure from the King to recognize Katanga, Eyskens was left torn and confused. Though unwilling to recognize Katanga out of the fear of the American reaction, the prime minister did accede to pressure from Baudouin and d'Aspremont Lynden to support Katanga.

Within a week of Katanga's unilateral declaration of independence, Lumumba sent a telegram to the Secretary-General of the UN, insisting that something be done about "Belgium's military aggression" in his country and its overt backing of Katangese secession. Lumumba requested "urgent military assistance" due to his government's inability to maintain order in the massive country. Among UN member states, sentiments towards Katanga were generally mixed. Britain and France remained neutral, the latter quietly hostile towards the very idea of peacekeeping in Congo. The British initially provided general assistance to the UN troops who were eventually dispatched, but refused to cooperate with subsequent efforts to deal with Tshombe's rebellious regime.

Portugal and the Union of South Africa were openly hostile towards the operation from its conception, and maintained consistent opposition against any interference with the Katanga state. Portugal permitted arms and mercenaries to enter Katanga from the Portuguese colony of Angola. Likewise, South Africa allowed mercenaries to be recruited within South Africa for Katanga and allowed both arms and European mercenaries to go to Katanga. Welensky wanted to intervene militarily to bring Katanga into the Central African Federation, but was unable to do so as the Federation had only a small army of 3,270 men at a time when black nationalist unrest was increasing all over the federation. However, Welensky allowed Katanga to continue its copper exports via federation railroads, permitted arms to be smuggled into Katanga, and allowed the Katangese to recruit white mercenaries within the federation who came mostly from Southern Rhodesia. In addition, the Federation's authorities generally allowed free passage of white mercenaries from South Africa, France and Belgium into Katanga. The town of Ndola in Northern Rhodesia was the principal base for the mercenaries that went into Katanga. In a letter to the Foreign Secretary Lord Home, Welensky wrote he was "unwilling to stand by idly and watch Mr. Tshombe destroyed ... if he is in danger of being destroyed by Afro-Asian pressures masquerading as United Nations operations, I shall do everything within my power to assist in his survival".

Gérard-Libois writes: "... during the entire month of August, a ... race against the clock took place with the objective of building a more or less efficient Katangese gendarmery before the eventual withdrawal of the Belgian troops. The commander of the new gendarmery, Major Crèvecoeur, called for former officers of the Force Publique who had left the Congo after the July troubles or were in Katanga." The numbers of the new force were originally fixed at 1,500 volunteers from 16 to 21 years of age recruited from 'safe' ethnic groups. Almost all the aircraft of the Force Publique had been transferred to Kamina, then requisitioned by Katanga.

=== Deployment of United Nations troops ===
On 14 July 1960, in response to requests by Lumumba, the UN Security Council adopted Resolution 143. This called upon Belgium to remove its military personnel from the Congo and for the UN to provide 'military assistance' to the Congolese forces to allow them 'to meet fully their tasks'. Lumumba demanded that Belgium remove its troops immediately, threatening to seek help from the Soviet Union if they did not leave within two days. The UN reacted quickly and established United Nations Operation in the Congo (ONUC). The first UN troops arrived the next day, but there was instant disagreement between Lumumba and the UN over the new force's mandate. Because the Congolese army had been in disarray, Lumumba wanted to use the UN peacekeepers to subdue Katanga by force. Referring to the resolution, Lumumba wrote to UN Secretary-General Dag Hammarskjöld, 'From these texts it is clear that, contrary to your personal interpretation, the UN force may be used to subdue the rebel government of Katanga.' ONUC refused. To Hammarskjöld, the secession of Katanga was an internal Congolese matter and the UN was forbidden to intervene by Article 2 of the United Nations Charter.

Disagreements over what the UN force could and could not do continued throughout its deployment despite the passage of two further Security Council resolutions. Passed on 22 July, Security Council Resolution 145 affirmed that Congo should be a unitary state and strengthened the call for Belgium to withdraw its forces. On 9 August, Security Council Resolution 146 mentioned Katanga for the first time and explicitly allowed UN forces to enter Katanga whilst forbidding their use to 'intervene in or influence the outcome of any internal conflict.' Unhappy with Eyskens's ambivalent policy, Baudouin tried to replace him at the beginning of August with Paul Van Zeeland with a mandate to recognize Katanga. The King's maneuver failed when the man he designated to serve as Foreign Minister in the new government, Paul-Henri Spaak, declined to take part.

A subject of much controversy was Belgium's involvement with Katanga. Brussels provided technical, financial, and military aid in order to keep Katanga stable in terms of public order and domestic security. The Belgians went on to advise the ONUC force against unnecessary interventions against the state, as it would only "risk increasing the confusion." At the same time, Pierre Wigny, the Foreign Minister, informed the United States, France, and Britain that his government was opposed to Tshombe's intrigues and was concerned that long-term separation would compromise Congo's economic vitality. The government of Katanga had attached to it 1,133 Belgian technicians in charge of the civil service, 114 Belgian Army officers and 117 Belgian Army NCOs commanding the Force Publique and 58 Belgian civil servants in charge of the ministries. Between 4–8 August 1960, Pierre Kauch of the National Bank of Belgium visited Katanga on behalf of the Belgian government with the aim of establishing a central bank for Katanga. Upon his return to Brussels, Kauch reported that Katanga was close to chaos and everything would depend upon the "watchfulness" of d'Aspremont Lynden, who had taken charge of relations with Katanga. Although most of Belgium's military personnel were withdrawn from Katanga in September 1960, over 200 stayed on, making horizontal career shifts into roles as paid mercenaries serving with the nation's Gendarmes. As late as 1963, several of these mercenaries were still at large, having shed their military uniforms for civilian dress. Other notable Belgian nationals who stayed on included political advisers and some diplomatic ministers. Upon the arrival of ONUC in the Congo, they were opposed to allowing ONUC freedom of movement in Katanga and insisted upon obstructing the peacekeeping effort. This view was generally strengthened with Tshombe himself as time advanced, especially with increasingly vocal demands from Léopoldville that the UN use their military advantage to forcibly remove his regime from power. The Security Council, however, only reaffirmed that the ONUC would not be party to any internal disputes but would enter Katanga to assist with keeping the peace. The first such personnel, largely Swedish forces, entered Élisabethville, the Katangese capital city, on 12 August 1960.

All of this only frustrated the Congolese government, which, on 27 August, launched a poorly organized, ill-fated, incursion into Katanga with Armée Nationale Congolaise soldiers trucked into the province on a motley assortment of Soviet military vehicles. This incident would only lead to the further deterioration of relations between the two governments; sporadic clashes would continue for the next two years. On 8 November, an Irish Army platoon, sent to repair a bridge in Niemba, was ambushed and nine of its men killed by Baluba tribesmen.

=== Foreign relations ===
On 3 October 1960, Katanga opened up an unrecognized diplomatic mission in New York with the aim of lobbying both for the recognition by the United States and to gain admission to the United Nations. The head of the mission was Michel Struelens, an "urbane and soft-spoken" Belgian who had previously been in charge of promoting tourism to Belgian Congo. As the United States did not have diplomatic relations with Katanga, Struelens traveled to New York from Brussels on a Belgian passport. The fact that Katanga was represented by a white man from Belgium was often used to attack Katanga as a sham. Struelens told a journalist that his mission was "to tell the Katanga story in the Western Hemisphere, based on the belief that Katanga is the only barrier against communist influence in the Congo".

Though the United States refused to recognize Katanga, Struelens was able to persuade much of the American right to support Katanga. One of Struelens's allies were the ultra-right-wing Liberty Lobby, which in a pamphlet declared: "Each new demand, no matter how extreme, has been fulfilled by the groggy demoralized Western nations. From 'infant independence' to gold-plated Cadillacs, every squeak of the Negro wheel has brought forth a new application of golden 'grease' in the effort to appease the unappeasable black revolution". Like other nationalists in the Third World who had experienced European imperialism and racism, African nationalists tended to be somewhat anti-Western in the 1950s–1960s, making the cause of African nationalism very suspect to rightists in the West, and as such Katanga, which was dominated by the Belgians, was seen as an example of the right sort of an African state. The conservative American intellectual James Burnham wrote in a column praising Katanga that what African nationalists want was "to destroy the power and privileges of the white men; to take over their property, or most of it; and to permit white men to remain only as servants and handmaids". Within liberal circles, Katanga was widely compared to Manchukuo, an ostensibly independent nation established in 1931 and ruled by the Emperor Puyi that was in fact a sham, a Japanese colony that masqueraded as a real country. Just as Puyi was the supposed ruler of Manchukuo with real power exercised by Japanese officials, it was noted that in case of Katanga the leader was Tshombe, but the real power was exercised by Belgian officials.

Another mission was opened in December 1960 in Paris by Dominique Diur. It mostly functioned as a recruitment office for foreign mercenaries, although such activities were illegal in France. A considerable number of French mercenaries were recruited to fight in Katanga, including Roger Faulques, Roger Trinquier, and Edgard Tupët-Thomé.

In Brussels, a mission was headed by Jacques Masangu. Just like the Paris mission, it recruited mercenaries to go and fight for the Katangese cause.

=== Further conflicts ===
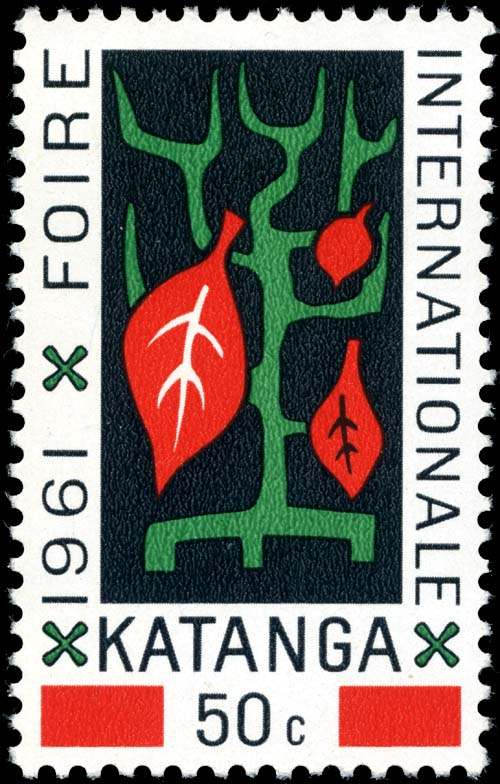
A Katangese postage stamp issued in 1961. Although Katanga was not a member of the Universal Postal Union, its stamps were tolerated on international mail.

Shortly afterwards, Lumumba was replaced in a coup d'état by Mobutu Sese Seko. On 17 January 1961, Mobutu sent Lumumba to Élisabethville, where he was tortured and executed shortly after arrival. On 18 January, Katangese Secretary of State of Information Lucas Samalenge visited several bars in Élisabethville, telling patrons that Lumumba was murdered; the police took Samalenge away.

The United Nations Security Council met in the wake of Lumumba's death in a highly emotional atmosphere charged with anti-colonial feeling and rhetoric. On 21 February 1961, the Council adopted resolution 161, which authorised "all appropriate measures" to "prevent the occurrence of civil war in the Congo", including "... the use of force, if necessary, in the last resort". This resolution demanded the expulsion from the Congo of all Belgian troops and foreign mercenaries but did not explicitly mandate the UN to conduct offensive operations. However, it was ultimately interpreted by the local UN forces to justify military operations in ending the secession of Katanga. Despite the resolution, during the next six months, the UN undertook no major military operations, concentrating instead on facilitating several rounds of political negotiations. However, many sources on location claimed that UN personnel initiated and maintained a high degree of violence and were both overtly and indirectly responsible for hundreds if not even thousands of civilian deaths.

From late 1960 onwards, Katanga was characterised by a series of clashes between pro-Tshombe loyalists and Baluba tribesmen, whose political leaders were nominally allied to Leopoldville and opposed Katangese secession. Smaller battles were fought against ANC units attacking from other provinces, as well. Sparsely deployed and on many occasions even outgunned by both sides, UN forces had an almost hopeless task of attempting to prevent outright civil war. Anticipating the need for continued ONUC presence in the state, the Security Council authorized an increased presence in Élisabethville. By mid-1961, however, presidential security forces had killed almost 7,000 Balubas. Factional strife also began to engulf the struggling regime. The arrival of more peacekeepers enraged many of the Baluba people, who viewed the United Nations forces as an unwanted intruder. They attacked both Katangese and UN soldiers with little discrimination.

=== Mercenary warfare ===
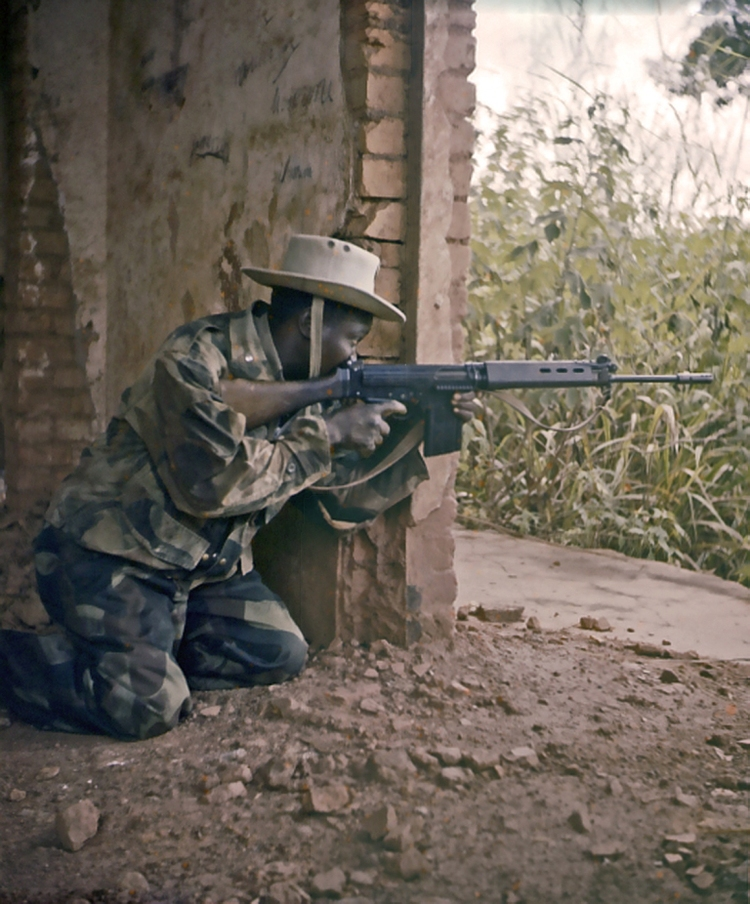
Katangese gendarme in 1961

In February 1961, attempting to bolster his position in Katanga, Tshombe began importing more foreign mercenaries from neighboring states to assist his Gendarmes. The "Mercenary Problem", as the international community termed it, was a major concern of the ONUC. The Katangese Army was already staffed by Belgian officers, and white volunteers of Belgian extraction constituted about 117 men under Tshombe's direction. Although from January to February 1961, gestures were made to remove these 'illegal combatants' from the Congo, their places were quickly taken by a sizable force of nearly 500 British, Rhodesian, French, and South African irregulars. Many of them were given command assignments in the Gendarmes, while others formed a pro-Tshombe unit known as the "International Company", composed chiefly of White South African fighters.

Especially notable among the French mercenaries were professional career soldiers who had fought in the Algerian War. Several were the heads of a para commando training program in Katanga. On 30 March, one of the first public reports mentioning large contingents of foreign soldiers claimed that the mercenaries in Katanga included "Belgians, Italians, and 100 South Africans". Serious fighting soon broke out as Tshombe began to incite both Katangese civilians and white mercenaries to attack UN forces after the ONUC dispatched elements of the nearly 5,000-man-strong 99th Indian Infantry Brigade into the capital. On 5 April 1961, the Secretary-General criticised Belgian mercenaries for their service in Katanga and condemned Tshombe for turning the Katangese public against the ONUC. Hostilities broke out again three days later, when Belgian and South African Gendarmes assaulted Kabalo, a Baluba town in northern Katanga, and engaged the Ethiopian peacekeepers stationed there. In the battle that followed, at least 30 mercenaries were disarmed and captured. It was not until 30 April that the State of Katanga agreed to cease hostilities against the ONUC.

=== Later developments ===
In June, Tshombe and Foreign Affairs Minister Évariste Kimba were arrested after attending the Coquilhatville Conference of Congo Leaders, the day they were about to board a plane back to their country. Tshombe was held under house arrest and charged with inciting revolt against the Congolese government, the illegal seizure of arms and aircraft, and printing counterfeit money by issuing Katangese currency. Tshombe subsequently signed a pledge to reunite Katanga with the rest of the nation, and was released accordingly. However, by August it was clear he had no intention of implementing this agreement. Tshombe openly declared in a speech that month that he would defend Katanga's rights as a sovereign state and would do everything to maintain this status quo even in the face of all opposition. During Tshombe's absence, posters with his image were put up on the streets of Élisabethville, and a college of three ministers was created to temporarily take over Tshombe's presidency. The triumvirate consisted of two of Katanga's strongmen, Munongo and Minister of Finance Jean-Baptiste Kibwe, and Minister of National Education Joseph Kiwele to ensure the balance between the two leaders.

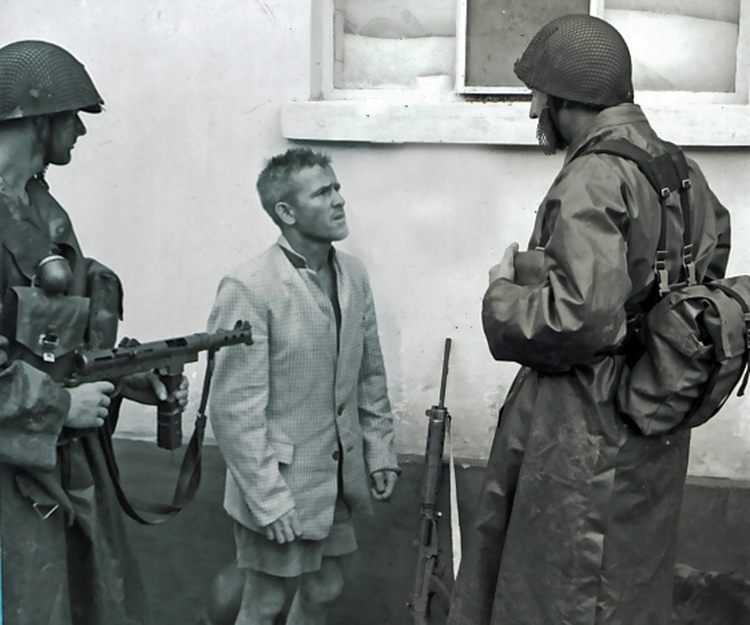
Swedish troops detain a white Katangese mercenary.

In August and September, the UN conducted two operations to arrest and repatriate mercenary soldiers and the Belgian political advisers from Katanga by military force, deeming that such foreigners were the backbone behind the regime. The first operation was carried out by Indian troops, who began rounding up mercenaries at 5 am, culminating in the bloodless capture of nearly 400 men. Not a single shot had been fired. Although Belgium's consul in Katanga was ordered to deport the remaining Belgian nationals, including political advisers, he countered that he could only exercise legal authority over those who were official staff affiliated with his nation's government or military.

Altogether, about 300 of those captured were expelled from Congo, although several of the mercenaries later returned. White Katangese especially expressed resentment at the U.N.'s actions. Tshombe expressed surprise, and tensions were high.

On 11 September, the ONUC demanded the explusion of all foreigners serving as police officers in Katanga, but Tshombe did not comply. It was revealed that some UN personnel were conspiring to remove Tshombe from power, seize the radio station in Élisabethville, and apprehend his Gendarmes. This crushed any chances of negotiation of a peaceful removal of remaining foreign players.

Katangese authorities investigated the plot, and when Tshombe confronted the UN with his charges, it was revealed, much to the latter's embarrassment, that these allegations were based on fairly solid evidence. If such an incident had been allowed to take place, it would clearly have been considered a violation of the ONUC's vows to remain neutral in internal issues besides taking proper action to prevent a major conflict.

The following day, hostilities reopened. A large force of Gendarmes, including many Europeans, surrounded 155 Irish soldiers serving as U.N. peacekeepers, who were protecting civilians in Jadotville. Under rifle and artillery fire and bombs dropped from elements of the Katanga's mercenary-piloted Air Force, the Irish troopers inflicted heavy casualties on the attacking forces. Without reinforcements and short on water, the outnumbered Irish company eventually surrendered. They were held as prisoners of war for approximately one month.

No longer able to accept the level of violence in Katanga, ONUC commanders enacted a plan to remove the Katangese government from power. ONUC troops set out to apprehend mercenaries, seize post offices and radio stations in Élisabethville, and send a representative from the central Congolese government to take command. Gendarmes and their mercenary allies resisted the moves. The U.N's attempt to take over the post offices was repulsed. Later that day, Katangese soldiers launched a coordinated attack on ONUC forces. The opposing forces waged an eight-day battle in the city, resulting in the deaths of 11 UN personnel. Tshombe's army enjoyed unchallenged air power, and the tiny Katangese Air Force carried out murderous strafing and bombing runs on UN forces entrenched in Jadotville, Élisabethville, and Kamina.

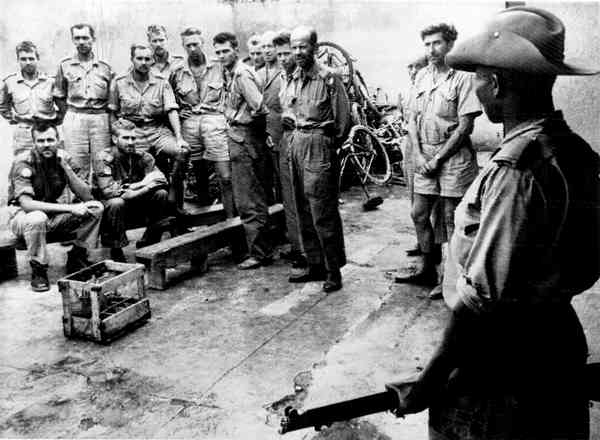
Katangese gendarme guards with Swedish ONUC soldiers taken prisoner

The dismal failure of the ONUC on this occasion may be attributed to inferior equipment. While the Gendarmes were armed with automatic rifles, heavy machine guns, mortars, and Greyhound armored cars, the vast majority of ONUC troopers used antiquated rifles and civilian vehicles plated with only makeshift protection. During the fighting, the Katangese authorities offered a conditional ceasefire, which was immediately rejected by the ONUC. Eventually, it became clear that the attempt to depose Tshombe had failed. British, Belgian, and French governments criticized the 'peacekeeping operations' in Congo, which involved interference in domestic affairs. They called for an immediate ceasefire. The Soviet Union, on the other hand, protested that more force should have been used to subdue Katanga and initiate an immediate reunification with the Mobutu government.

In the course of the limited peace negotiations that ensued, Hammarskjöld and 15 others were killed in a plane crash near Ndola, Northern Rhodesia (now Zambia), under questionable circumstances. Some evidence suggests the plane was shot down. Hammarskjöld's death set off a succession crisis at the United Nations, as there was no line of succession and the Security Council had to vote on a successor.

Under pressure from the ONUC, Tshombe agreed to a three-stage plan, presented by the new acting Secretary General, U Thant, that would have reunited Katanga with Congo. However, this remained an agreement on paper only. The Katangese government insisted that should the plan in full be honored by Leopoldville, Tshombe be entitled to aid in drafting a new Congolese constitution and elect his own representatives to Parliament. However, both sides expressed reservations about the terms less than a week later. The president wished that his agreement should be ratified by his national assembly before it could be considered binding; this misunderstanding quickly led to a collapse in relations with Congolese government of Prime Minister Cyrille Adoula.

The UN then adopted a new plan that called for the adoption of a federal constitution in Congo within thirty days, an end to the illegal Katangese rebellion, the unification of currency, and the sharing of mining revenues on a fifty–fifty split between Katanga and the central government. U Thant, who was the chief architect of this proposal, also demanded that Tshombe unconditionally release all of his political prisoners. Belgium and the United States, hoping that the latter would have a positive role in reforming a unified Congo, endorsed the plan. While Cyrille Adoula immediately accepted this compromise, Tshombe stipulated conditions. A series of discussions hosted by the UN followed but failed to yield tangible results. Thant, who had become incensed by what he regarded as the Katangese state stalling for time, imposed economic sanctions. This, however, destroyed the last hopes the Secretary-General had for a peaceful integration. On 19 December, an exasperated Tshombe withdrew from negotiations in protest.

The new administration of John F. Kennedy decided that the Adoula government represented the best hope of stability in the Congo, as Adoula professed to be a firm anti-Communist. As Katanga happened to possess most of Congo's mineral wealth, it was realized that Adoula government could not economically function if Katanga were allowed to secede, This caused Kennedy to support Congolese unity.

In New York Struelens called a press conference to say: "When the UN says it has committed no atrocities in Katanga, I distribute pictures of atrocities and so give proof of the bloody mess of the UN in Katanga". In response, the Kennedy administration cancelled Struelens's visa with the intention of expelling him but backed down after Katanga's friends in Congress raised a media uproar. To win the propaganda war, Kennedy commissioned the Undersecretary of State George Ball to make a case to the media that Katanga was unworthy of American support. In a speech that was later published by the State Department as a pamphlet, Ball argued that the majority of the people in Katanga did not support the Tshombe regime. Noting that Belgian officials had all the real power in Katanga, he argued that Katanga, like Manchukuo, was an artificial state created as a cloak for imperialism of others.

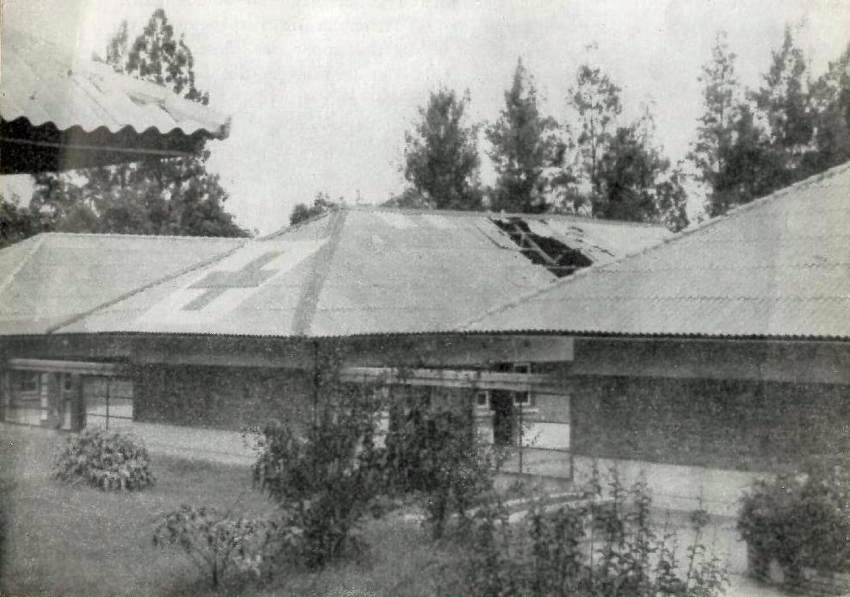
Red Cross hospital bombarded by UN forces during Operation Unokat, 1962

=== Final days ===
As 1962 drew to a close, the UN gradually increased its operational strength in Katanga, with Thant considering ever more seriously the option of forcibly ending Tshombe's secession. As ONUC forces continued to be harassed by Gendarmerie, the political stalemate rapidly escalated into outright military tension. When the Katangese populace celebrated the anniversary of their independence, for example, UN officials blocked the roads into Élisabethville, fearful of the 2,000-strong "honour guard" that was scheduled to march in the day's parades. Several thousand civilian residents then demonstrated against this unilateral action.

Two months later, local authorities impounded several railroad cars bearing equipment and supplies for use in ONUC operations. Some Gurkha peacekeepers were wounded by unmarked land mines on the Katangese border.

A report compiled by the Brookings Institution indicated that the Katangese regime was purchasing military aircraft and enlarging its army. It reported that the regime now had at their disposal "40,000 troops and Gendarmerie, at least 400 mercenaries, and at least 20 planes." This was an exaggeration, but the Secretary-General's office responded by increasing trade sanctions. Several member states, the United Kingdom in particular, opposed the use of embargoes to force a political solution.

On 20 December, the American State Department announced it would be sending a US military mission to Katanga. This plan was criticised by white and black Katangese alike. At least a hundred students, many of them European, protested at the United States consulate. The Congolese government and the Eastern Bloc also voiced their dissent.

It soon became apparent that Katanga's bid for international recognition was doomed. Strong pressure for direct action, American interest, the militant mood of the ONUC commanders, and Belgium's pledge to cease supporting the rebel government suggested that the United Nations would soon take forceful measures against Tshombe.

=== Surrender ===
On 24 December 1962, ONUC forces and Katangese Gendarmes clashed near an ONUC observation post near Élisabethville. A helicopter was shot down. Tshombe expressed regrets over what he said was a misunderstanding, promising to call off his forces. But three days later, the firing by both sides had not ceased. ONUC officers notified the National Assembly that they would take necessary action in self-defense unless a ceasefire was observed immediately. Operation Grandslam was launched the following day and peacekeepers marched on Élisabethville to neutralize the Gendarmes.

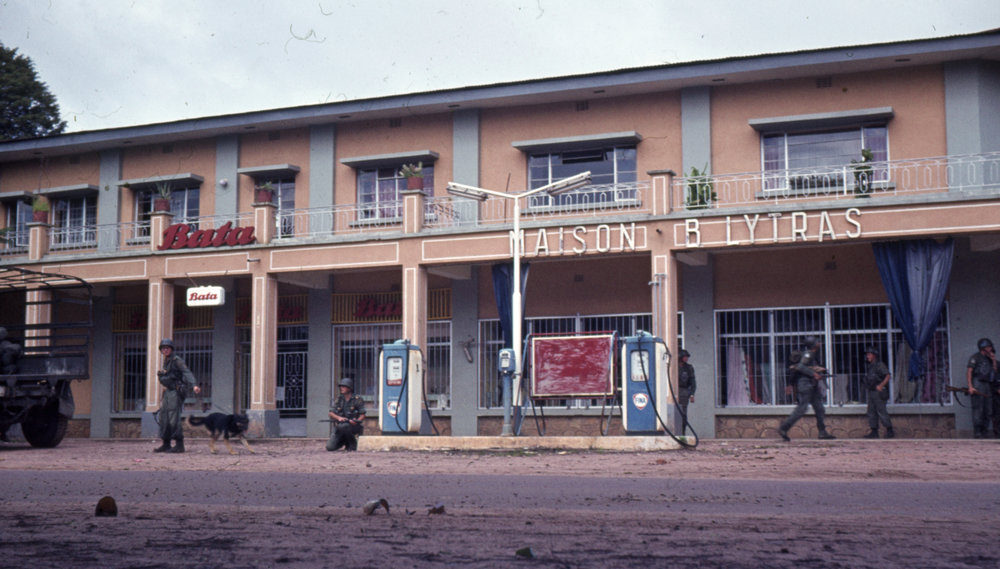
Swedish troops clear Kaminaville of Katangese resistance, 31 December 1962.

Map of the Operation Grandslam which ended the Katanga state

Within three days, Élisabethville was under UN control. Many Gendarmes were captured or forced to withdraw westward. Foreign mercenaries scattered. U.N.-supporting fighter aircraft conducted at least 70 sorties against the Katangese Air Force. All but two jets were destroyed on the ground.

Tshombe escaped his capital but threatened to launch a counteroffensive unless the ONUC restrained itself and called off its attack. A truce was put in place and observed until 1 January. Then in a controversial act of defiance, ONUC personnel explicitly ignored orders from New York and assaulted Jadotville. Katangese forces demolished the bridges over the Lufira River to stop them, but they crossed using debris, despite sporadic sniper fire and captured Jadotville. Some suggested later that the attack on Jadotville was due to the poor state of communications then plaguing ONUC in Katanga and across Congo. The capture of Jadotville prevented Tshombe's loyalists from making a stand there, as had been feared.

After the fall of Jadotville, other controversial incidents involved ONUC forces and foreign civilians in Katanga. Indian soldiers fired on and killed two Belgian women in a car at a road checkpoint. Other civilians were killed, including two unidentified Europeans, who died as a result of actions taken by the members of the ONUC. Following these incidents, U Thant suspended military operations while Belgian and British officials held discussions with Tshombe and attempted to talk him into capitulating. It became clear that he was running short of time.

On 11 January, peacekeepers entered Sakania, near the Rhodesian border. Katangese Gendarmes had been routed there and failed to pose a serious threat. Remaining mercenaries, mostly Frenchmen and South Africans, were leader-less and ignored instructions to follow a "scorched earth" policy. They fled the country by way of Angola.

On 15 January, Tshombe conceded defeat and on 21 January allowed UN officials into his last stronghold, Kolwezi. He agreed that land mines and demolitions were to be removed, and all armed rebels directed to surrender. Tshombe reportedly gave a final address to his supporters, saying "For the last two and a half years you have twice fought heroically against the enemy. Now their superiority has become overwhelming."

=== Aftermath ===
The Congolese government took immediate steps to reintegrate Katanga with the rest of the country. Gendarmes were absorbed into the national military, and Joseph Ileo, former Prime Minister, was appointed Resident Minister of the new province. The UN provided assistance in reuniting divided economic and administrative divisions. On 29 January, the Secretary-General's office stated that most UN action in the former state would be limited to economics.

But it was agreed that a substantially reduced force would be maintained to keep order. Denmark, Ghana, and the Philippines each pledged to dispatch personnel. U Thant called for a slow reduction of military presence, in case fanatics or diehards attempted a second secession. Although he defended the use of force taken by ONUC in ousting Tshombe, he said he regretted the fighting that had occurred, saying, "For a peace force, even a little fighting is too much, and only a few casualties are too many."

In July 1964, Tshombe returned from exile to become Prime Minister of Congo at the head of a coalition government, succeeding Cyrille Adoula. He was dismissed from his position in October 1965.

== Politics ==
=== Constitution ===
The Constitution of Katanga was promulgated 5 August 1960. It consisted of 66 articles and set out the political structure of Katanga and the rights of its citizens.

=== Executive ===
The political system of Katanga was significantly different from that established in the Republic of the Congo where executive power was divided between the president as head of state and the prime minister as head of government. Instead Katanga had an assembly-independent system, with the President of Katanga being both head of state and head of government. The president headed the Cabinet of Ministers and was also the Commander in Chief of the Katangese military. The president had a four-year renewable term but was not elected by popular vote, but by a two-thirds majority of the deputies of the Katanga parliament – the National Assembly.

=== Legislature ===
Legislative power was divided between the president and parliament who both had legislative powers. The National Assembly consisted of 64 deputies (58 of them belonged to CONAKAT). 85% of the seats were directly elected while the other 15% were for representatives of traditional tribal authorities.

The Grand Council acted occasionally as an upper house but did not hold legislative power. It consisted of 20 leading tribal chiefs. The Grand Council had veto powers on key issues including constitutional matters, legal practice, taxation and the functioning and running of the vital mining industry. The veto could be overridden by a two-thirds vote in the National Assembly.

While being nominally a multi-party democracy in reality the state was dominated by the CONAKAT party.

=== Ministers ===
Through the application of the Constitution of Katanga on 4 August 1960, eleven ministers were appointed. Names and positions are taken from the report of the Belgian parliamentary inquiry into the assassination of Lumumba, names of cabinet members are taken from Guy Weber, Le Katanga de Moïse Tshombe, unless otherwise noted. Salomon Tshizand died on 23 May 1961, Joseph Kiwele died on 14 November 1961, and Lucas Samalenge died on 19 November 1961. They were not replaced. Cléophas Mukeba resigned on 22 April 1961, and was replaced by Chrysostome Mwewa, who became Secretary of State of Public Health.

Government Ministers
| Name | Function | Party | Cabinet members |
|---|---|---|---|
| Moïse Tshombe | President of the State of Katanga | CONAKAT | Jacques Bartelous (Chef de Cabinet); Xavier Grandjean (Deputy Chef de Cabinet); Paul Ngoie (Attaché); Captain Mwamba (Ordinance Officer); Ivan Grignard (government secretary); Evariste Mbuyi (deputy of Ivan Grignard) |
| Godefroid Munongo | Minister of the Interior | CONAKAT | Victor Tignée (Chef de Cabinet); Charles "Carlo" Huyghé (Deputy Chef de Cabinet, from 12 July 1960 until October 1960); Paul Boons (legal adviser) |
| Jean-Baptiste Kibwe | Minister of Finance, Vice-President of the Ministerial Council (from 30 August 1960) | CONAKAT | René Bastin (Chef de Cabinet); Jean-Godefroid Mubanda (Deputy Chef de Cabinet); Paul Gibson (attaché and secretary) |
| Alphonse Kiela | Minister of Telecommunication | CONAKAT | U. Van Grabeeckx (Chef de Cabinet); Gaston Ilunga (Deputy Chef de Cabinet) |
| Joseph Kiwele | Minister of National Education | CONAKAT | Marcel Petit (Chef de Cabinet); Benoît Nyunzi (Deputy Chef de Cabinet) |
| Évariste Kimba | Minister of Foreign Affairs | CONAKAT | Henri Demers (Deputy Chef de Cabinet) |
| Valentin Ilunga | Minister of Justice | CONAKAT | Dominique Diur (Chef de Cabinet, until his appointment in Paris from December 1960); Pierre Ndaie (Deputy Chef de Cabinet) |
| Cléophas Mukeba | Minister of Public Health | MNC—Kalonji | André Muntu (Chef de Cabinet); Grégoire Kashala (Deputy Chef de Cabinet); Dr. de Scheitz (Adviser) |
| Paul Muhona | Minister of Work and Social Affairs | Independent | Raymond Deghilage (Chef de Cabinet); Christophe Kolongo (Deputy Chef de Cabinet) |
| Sylvestre Kilonda | Minister of Agriculture | CONAKAT | Jean Michel (Chef de Cabinet); Jean Kalume (Deputy Chef de Cabinet) |
| Salomon Tshizand | Minister of Economic Affairs | Independent | Jean Nawej (Chef de Cabinet); Pherson Nguza (Deputy Chef de Cabinet) |

=== Secretaries of State ===
In October 1960, the Secretariats were created, thereby enlarging the Katangese government.

Secretaries of State
| Name | Function | Party | Cabinet members |
|---|---|---|---|
| Gabriel Kitenge | Secretary of State of Public Works | Union congolaise | Jean Vandekerkhove (Chef de Cabinet); Raphaël Senga (Deputy Chef de Cabinet) |
| Bonaventure Makonga | Secretary of State of Foreign Trade | CONAKAT | Joseph Onckelinx (Chef de Cabinet) |
| Lucas Samalenge | Secretary of State of Information | CONAKAT | Etienne Ugeux (Chef de Cabinet until October 1961); Gabriel Letellier (Chef de Cabinet from October to November 1961); Barhélemy Bwengu (Deputy Chef de Cabinet); Christian Souris (public relations officer) |
| Albert Nyembo | Secretary of State of Public Function | CONAKAT | Albert Brodur (Chef de Cabinet); Léonard Ilunga (Deputy Chef de Cabinet) |
| Joseph Yav | Secretary of State of National Defense | CONAKAT | Lieutenant-Colonel André Grandjean (Chef de Cabinet, until November 1961); Charles "Carlo" Huyghé (Deputy Chef de Cabinet from October 1960 until November 1961, Chef de Cabinet from November 1961); Edgard Tupët-Thomé (adviser from 21 June to 21 July 1961); Jacques Duchemin (military adviser in December 1960, from 18 December 1960 Deputy Secretary of State and member of the Select Interministerial Council of Defense) |

=== Other appointments ===
Others
| Name | Function | Party | Notes |
|---|---|---|---|
| Jacques Masangu | Resident Minister at the European Economic Community in Brussels | BALUBAKAT | Former Vice-President of the Senate in Léopoldville for CONAKAT's rival BALUBAKAT party, rallied to Tshombe's side on 15 July 1960. The office in Brussels closed on 26 January 1962. In December 1962, he moved back to Léopoldville as a Senator for the central government. His collaborators include Mwepu (head of the administrative section); Philippart (head of the consulate); de Spirlet (head of the cultural section); Mertens (protocol section); Henrard (economic section) |
| Dominique Diur | Resident Minister in Paris | CONAKAT | Collaborators at the Paris office include Colonel Bernard Delègue (political adviser); Captain Jean-Louis Bovagnet (military adviser); and Jacques Sidos (consular adviser for cultural and press relations) (Note: Co-founder, with his brother Pierre Sidos, of the neo-fascist movement Jeune Nation) |
| Odilon Mwenda | Secretary of State at the European Economic Community in Brussels | CONAKAT | Assisted Jacques Masangu at the representation in Brussels, and replaced him as the head of the office at the beginning of 1962. |

Furthermore, the Belgian Michel Struelens opened the Katanga Information Services office in New York on 1 October 1960.

=== Police ===
The Katangese National Police (French: Police Nationale Katangaise) was the law enforcement and state security of Katanga. The General Commissioner of Police was Pius Sapve and the force was governed by the Ministry of Internal Affairs, headed by Godefroid Munongo.

== See also ==
- Free Republic of the Congo
- Front for the National Liberation of the Congo
- Siege of Jadotville
- South Kasai, another secessionist government during the same time period
