= Michel Struelens =

Belgian civil servant

- Michel Struelens, representing Congolese Prime Minister Moïse Tshombe, in 1964.

Head of the Katanga Information Services
- In office October 1, 1960 – January 17, 1963
- President: Moïse Tshombe
- Preceded by: position established
- Succeeded by: position abolished

Personal details
- Born: 10 March 1928; Saint-Gilles, Belgium
- Died: 5 October 2014 (aged 86)
- Education: University of Antwerp, Antwerp; American University (PhD)

Michel Maurice Joseph Georges Struelens (10 March 1928 – 5 October 2014) was a Belgian civil servant who represented Moïse Tshombe, President of the unrecognized State of Katanga, in the United States.

== Early life and career ==
Struelens grew up in the Belgian Congo, where his father was a civil servant. In 1950, he was employed by the Economic Affairs Department of the Belgian Congo as inspector, and eventually as provincial director ad interim. He was sent to Brussels, Belgium, in 1957 to help prepare the World Expo Expo 58. In 1958, he became the head of the tourist office of Belgian Congo and Ruanda-Urundi, an office that he subsequently moved from Brussels to Bukavu in the Belgian Congo.

Struelens married Godelieve De Wilde and had five children.

== Katanga Information Services ==
At the request of Moïse Tshombe, Struelens set up the Katanga Information Services on Fifth avenue, New York, as an information office meant to gather support for the Katangese secession, former province of the newly independent Republic of Congo. He was authorized by the Belgian government to do so, according to Foreign Minister Paul-Henri Spaak. A "propagandist with aplomb", according to the New York Times, Struelens attracted influential anti-Communists and allies of the Katangese cause, notably Senator Thomas J. Dodd. Although the State of Katanga was never recognized by any government, Struelens was allowed to stay in the United States.

When Cyrille Adoula became the Prime Minister of Congo in August 1961, however, the United States took a firmer stance against Tshombe. According to diplomat George C. McGhee, Struelens knew that his office was tapped. Faced with the uneasy situation of the Katanga Information Services, the State Department used Struelens' incorrect visa as a pretext to expel him. A Congressional investigation, co-chaired by Dodd and James Eastland had to determine whether the State Department abused its power in this matter. Senator Kenneth Keating stated that "the actions of the State Department in reference to Struelens have been beneath our dignity as a great power and will not serve to impress either those who agree or disagree with the position of the State Department toward the Congo problem. Eventually, Struelens did not get deported before the end of the Katangese secession in January 1963.

== Later life ==
Struelens left the United States for Canada in August 1963. After Tshombe became Prime Minister of Congo in July 1964, Struelens became the personal representative for Tshombe in his dealings with the government of the United States.

When Tshombe's plane was hijacked and redirected to Algiers where he got detained, Struelens and other Tshombe advocates founded the Tshombe Emergency Committee. Notable members of the committee were American conservative journalists, authors, government officials and actors such as Max Yergan, Spruille Braden, Walter S. Robertson, William F. Buckley, George S. Schuyler, Ralph de Toledano, Eugene C. Pulliam, Arleigh Burke, August Johansen, Walter H. Judd, Katharine St. George, Karl August Wittfogel, Lammot du Pont Copeland, and Efrem Zimbalist Jr. Struelens travelled to several European capitals to lobby for Tshombe's release, to no avail: Tshombe died in Algiers in 1969.

Struelens obtained his PhD at the Department of Political Science, International Law and Relations at the American University in 1968 with a dissertation entitled ONUC and International Politics. Later, he became a professor at the School of International Service of the American University in Washington, D.C. He died on 5 October 2014.

== Publications ==
- Struelens, Michel (1976). The United Nations in the Congo, or O.N.U.C., and international politics. Brussels: Max Arnold.
