= Etienne Ugeux =

Belgian journalist (1923–1998)

- Born: 1923
- Died: 18 February 1998
- Occupation: journalist
- Spouse: Claire Ugeux-Harms

Etienne Ugeux (1923–1998) was a Belgian journalist.

== Career in the Congo ==
"An exceptional man, with a pure intellectual integrity, he wasn't manipulable by the Great Lakes of Africa and elsewhere. As a witness to the worst horrors during the wars he reported on as a grand reporter for Le Soir newspaper on the burning soil of the continent, he did not cease to hope that, finally, all Africans could regain their dignity lost several centuries ago, and this until his final breath."

— Dominique Ugeux's reflection on his father Etienne

Ugeux started his career at Belgian newspaper La Libre Belgique, before moving to the colonial capital of the Belgian Congo, Léopoldville, in 1950. Ugeux worked in the Belgian Congo at the radio station Radio Congo belge. Together with his colleague André Scohy, he founded the Belgo-Congolese Cultural Group (Groupement culturel belgo-congolais) in 1954. Congolese members of the group included Justin Bomboko, Albert Delvaux, Joseph Ileo, Joseph-Désiré Mobutu, and Moïse Tshombe.

He later became a colonial civil servant, serving as the director of information of the colonial government until independence on 30 June 1960. He met sergeant Joseph-Désiré Mobutu for the first time in 1956, who would later become President of the Congo/Zaire. Ugeux helped him in his pursuit to become a journalist.

=== Katangese Secretariat of State for Information ===
Eleven days after Congolese independence, the southern province of Katanga seceded under the lead of Moïse Tshombe and with covert Belgian backing. In October 1960, Belgian Prime Minister Gaston Eyskens and his Minister for African Affairs informed Ugeux that President of the newly independent State of Katanga Moïse Tshombe wanted him to become Chef de Cabinet of the newly appointed Secretary of State for Information Lucas Samalenge. He left for Katanga's capital Élisabethville and accepted the position. His wife joined him a week later whereas their children stayed in Belgium.

When Congolese Prime Minister Patrice Lumumba and fellow imprisoned politicians Maurice Mpolo and Joseph Okito were sent to Katanga during the afternoon of 17 January 1961, Ugeux was at the Cinéma Palace movie theatre with Samalenge and Tshombe at a screening of the Moral Re-Armament campaign when Tshombe was called to his residence.

== Journalistic career ==
On 21 July 1961, Ugeux left Katanga to become a journalist at the Belgian newspaper Le Soir.

== Family ==
Etienne was the brother of William Ugeux (1909 — 1997), a member of the Belgian Resistance during the Second World War, and the father of Dominique Ugeux (1949 — 2019), cabinet member of Paul Vanden Boeynants, who had close ties with Mobutu.
