= William Ugeux =

Belgian resistance fighter

- Born: February 22, 1909; Brussels, Belgium
- Died: October 13, 1997 (aged 88); Brussels, Belgium
- Occupation: Belgian resistance fighter

William Ugeux was a member of the Belgian Resistance during the Second World War.

== Biography ==
Ugeux was born on 22 February 1909 in Brussels, Belgium. He registered at the Brussels bar in 1932. He started working as a journalist. At the age of 24, Cardinal Joseph Van Roey brought Ugeux at the helm of the catholic newspaper Le Vingtième Siècle. By the outbreak of the Second World War, he entered the Belgian Resistance through the intelligence network Service de renseignement Zéro. Towards the end of 1941, he became the head of the network. He left Belgium for London in March 1943, where he became the director general of the Intelligence and Actions Service (Fr.: Services de renseignements et d’actions) of the State Security.

After the war, Ugeux worked at the magazine La revue nouvelle as well as the newspaper La relève. In 1950, he became the editor-in-chief of the newly founded La cité until 1955. Minister of the Colonies Auguste Buisseret proposed Ugeux to lead the public information institute for the Congo and Rwanda-Urundi INFORCONGO. After Congolese independence in 1960, Ugeux proposed Minister for Foreign Affairs Pierre Wigny to found a Belgian institute for Information and Documentation (INBEL), which he will lead until 1975. From 1955 onwards as well, he changed his profession and worked as a professor at the Université catholique de Louvain until 1979. Ugeux was a historian of the Belgian Resistance and wrote several books on this subject.

He died on 13 October 1997 in Brussels, Belgium.

== Personal life ==
Ugeux was the eldest child in a family of seven children. His siblings included Etienne Ugeux. He married Andrée Vercruysse (1908–1971) in 1933. The marriage remained childless.

He studied at the St Michael College, Brussels.

== Bibliography ==
His notable books include:

- Le passage de l'Iraty
- Les relations publiques : une fonction sociale nouvelle
- Histoires de résistants
- 150 ans d'information
- Le "Groupe G" (1942-1944) : deux héros de la Résistance : Jean Burgers et Robert Leclercq
- André Oleffe ou le Dialogue en circuit fermé

== See also ==
- Hergé
