= Jean-Baptiste Kibwe =

Congolese-Katangese politician (1924–2008)

Minister of Finance of the State of Katanga
- In office 4 August 1960 – 21 January 1963 (end of the secession)

Personal details
- Born: 3 March 1924 Kilwa, Belgian Congo
- Died: 21 November 2008 (aged 84) Brussels, Belgium
- Party: CONAKAT

Jean-Baptiste Kibwe Pampala Uwitwa (Kilwa, 3 March 1924 — Brussels, 21 November 2008) was a Congolese-Katangese politician who was the Minister of Justice and Vice-President of the State of Katanga.

== Early life ==
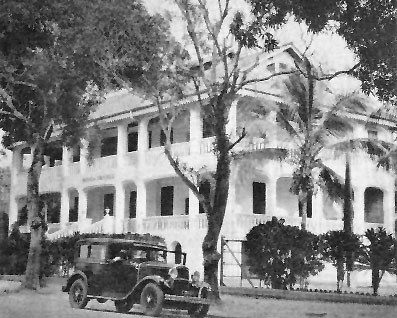
The Belgian Congo Bank in Léopoldville, around 1942.

Jean-Baptiste Kibwe was a Bwile, population group which mostly lives around Lake Mweru, Pweto territory. He attended primary school and four years of Catholic secondary school. Afterwards, he worked for the railway firm of the Comité spécial du Katanga (CSK) for a year. From 1948 to 1949, he was a clerk at the Banque du Congo belge. In 1949, he became a civil servant working for the Belgian colonial administration until 1956. From 1954 to 1956, he was a judge at the municipal court of Élisabethville. In 1956, he quit the colonial administration to take up a mandate at the customary tribunal.

== Political career ==
When the provincial governor Moïse Tshombe of the newly independent Congo proclaimed the independence of his province, Kibwe first became the Minister of Finance, and then from 30 August 1960, Vice-President of the Ministerial Council. Together with Tshombe and Godefroid Munongo, he was one of the strongmen of the newly installed regime.

=== Involvement in Lumumba's murder ===
Kibwe's name is often cited as a major player in the murder of Congolese Prime Minister Patrice Lumumba. On the day when Lumumba, Joseph Okito, and Maurice Mpolo were transferred from Léopoldville to Élisabethville, Kibwe was doing a few test rounds of Austrian jeeps, together with Secretary of State of Public Works Gabriel Kitenge. Munongo, on his way to Luano airport, told Kibwe that "three packages" would be delivered, namely the three Léopoldville politicians. Later that day, Kibwe attended the execution of Lumumba and his two colleagues, about sixty kilometres from Élisabethville.

== Later life ==
After the secession ended in 1963, Kibwe was a candidate in the election to become provincial President of the newly created Katanga Oriental province. He obtained eight votes, and lost against Édouard Bulundwe, who obtained thirteen votes out of a total of twenty-one provincial deputies. He became the provincial Minister of Finance under Bulundwe.

In 1965, the year of Joseph-Désiré Mobutu's second coup d'État, the new president appointed Kibwe as administrator for Union Minière du Haut-Katanga for a brief period. After the nationalisation of Union Minière, when the Belgian company became the Congolese company Gecomin, later Gécamines, Kibwe became the President of the Administrative Board.

In February 1968, Kibwe was arrested and condemned to penal servitude.

In 1976, Kibwe went to Luanda, Angola, and approached the anti-Mobutu Congolese National Liberation Front (FLNC) rebels, who would try to overthrow the president of the renamed Zaire twice during the Shaba I and Shaba II wars. The representative of Kibwe, Deogratias Symba, was a notable personality within the FLNC, but rebel leader Nathanaël Mbumba tried to arrest Kibwe, who succeeded in escaping through the help of the Belgian ambassador. Between the two Shaba wars, Mobutu pushed through several political reforms and political purges. In this context, he dismissed Jean Nguza Karl-i-Bond, Tshombe's nephew, from his position as Minister of Foreign Affairs, citing an alleged collusion with Kibwe a few months before Shaba I in which he allegedly was informed of an imminent attack.

Kibwe was an MP for the non-armed opposition during the political transition period from 2003 to 2006. On 16 July 2001, Kibwe testified in front of the Belgian Parliamentary Commission regarding the assassination of Lumumba. In November of the same year, he was arrested in Lubumbashi and transferred to Kinshasa, probably within the context of his testimony for the Lumuba commission. He also exercised a function at the Katebe Katoto foundation.
