= Joseph Okito =

Congolese politician

Second Vice-President of the Senate of the Republic of the Congo
- In office 22 June 1960 – 14 September 1960
- Succeeded by: Isaac Kalonji

Senator from Kasai Province
- In office May 1960 – 17 January 1961

Personal details
- Born: 5 February 1910 Koyapongo, Lusambo Territory, Belgian Congo
- Died: 17 January 1961 (aged 50) Near Élisabethville, State of Katanga
- Party: Mouvement National Congolais

Joseph Okito (5 February 1910 – 17 January 1961) was a Congolese politician and close political ally to Patrice Lumumba who briefly served as Second Vice-President of the Senate of the Democratic Republic of the Congo (then Republic of the Congo). He was executed alongside Lumumba in Katanga in 1961.

== Biography ==
Joseph Okito was born on 5 February 1910 in the village of Koyapongo, Lusambo Territory, Belgian Congo. He worked for the colonial administration for many years, serving as the chief of the Batetela sector of the Lusambo Territory. He was cited by the évolués of Luluabourg in a March 1944 memorandum as an example of a dedicated civil servant. He was later admitted into the Union des Interets Sociaux Congolais, an elite cultural society for évolués. Okito enjoyed an elevated social status due to his entrepreneurship and significant ownership of property. He was co-opted into the Kasai Provincial Council in 1957, serving until 1959. During the same time he regularly contributed to the monthly Communauté de Luluabourg in Otetela, Tshiluba, and French. The colonial administration selected him as one of two Congolese to be trained to take over the role of commissioner of the Sankuru district. Okito thought the training would assist him in a future political career. He was sent to Lusambo to shadow the district commissioner and was educated on the principles of administration for one hour each day. In 1959 he founded and became president of the Union rurale du Congo. The union later merged into the moderate Parti National du Progrès, but Okito was convinced by Patrice Lumumba to join the nationalist the Mouvement National Congolais (MNC). The following year he became president of the Sankuru chapter of the party.

In March 1960 Okito participated in the Akutshu-Anamongo Congress of Lodja, serving as one of the conference's vice presidents. Later he was made a senator from Kasai Province of the independent Republic of the Congo. He competed for the position of First Vice-President of the Senate, but lost against BALUBAKAT politician Jacques Masangu. On 22 June 1960 he was elected Second Vice-President of the Senate. In early September Prime Minister Lumumba was fired by President Joseph Kasa-Vubu. Lumumba challenged the action and a political impasse ensued. (Note: According to Makombo, on 7 September Okito became a member of an "arbitration commission" established by Parliament to mediate the dispute. Hoskyns and Artigue do not list Okito as a member of the commission.) On 14 September Joseph-Désiré Mobutu launched a coup that removed Lumumba from power and adjourned Parliament.

In late November Lumumba fled political hostility in the capital to organise a new government in Stanleyville. He was captured before he could complete his escape and imprisoned at the army camp in Thysville. Okito was preemptively arrested near Kikwit and was later transferred to the camp, along with Minister of Youth and Sports Maurice Mpolo. On 17 January 1961, discipline in the base faltered and all three men were flown to Élisabethville, capital of the secessionist State of Katanga. Once there, they were brutally tortured at the hands of Moïse Tshombe and Godefroid Munongo, Lumumba's chief political rivals and the leaders of the secessionist state. That night, one by one they were lined up against a tree to be executed via firing squad. Okito was the first to be shot. As he was led to the tree, he said, "I want my wife and children in Léopoldville to be taken care of," to which someone replied, "We're in Katanga, not in Léo!" Following the execution his body was immediately placed in a nearby grave. The following morning, on orders of Katangan Interior Minister Godefroid Munongo who wanted to make the bodies disappear and thereby prevent a burial site from being created, Belgian Gendarmerie officer Gerard Soete and his team dug up and dismembered the corpses, and dissolved them in sulfuric acid while the bones were ground and scattered.

On 17 January 2011, a mass of thanksgiving was held in memory of Mpolo and Okito at the Notre-Dame Cathedral in Kinshasa.
