= General Association of the Baluba of the Katanga =

1960s political party in the Democratic Republic of Congo

The General Association of the Baluba of the Katanga (French: Association Genérale des Baluba du Katanga, BALUBAKAT) was a political party in the Belgian Congo, in what is today the Democratic Republic of Congo. Its leader and president was Jason Sendwe, who was born to a Baluba family.

Sendwe founded BALUBAKAT in 1957 with the stated aim of encouraging unity among the Baluba of the Katanga Province. According to journalist Évariste Kimba, he was able amass much of their support through his "dynamism" and frequent interactions with the population. Three tenants underlined his political philosophy: protection of the Baluba, achievement of Congolese independence, and the primacy of conciliation in settling disputes.

In January 1964 Sendwe lost his position as president of BALUBAKAT. In June Simba rebels overthrew his government and killed him, though it is unclear who held ultimate responsibility for his death.
