= CONAKAT =

Katanga political party in the Belgian Congo

Confederation of Tribal Associations of Katanga Confédération des Associations tribales du Katanga
- President: Moïse Tshombe
- Founders: Moïse Tshombe; Godefroid Munongo; Dominique Diur; Évariste Kimba; Albert Nyembo; Rodolphe Yav
- Founded: 1958
- Dissolved: 1965
- Headquarters: Élisabethville, Katanga (State of Katanga)
- Ideology: Katangese nationalism Tribalism; Anti-communism
- Political position: Right-wing
- National affiliation: CONACO (1965)

The Confederation of Tribal Associations of Katanga (French: Confédération des associations tribales du Katanga; CONAKAT) was one of the main political parties in the Belgian Congo and was led by the pro-Western regionalist Moïse Tshombe and his interior minister, Godefroid Munongo. It became the ruling party of the State of Katanga whose declaration of independence sparked the Congo Crisis.

== History ==
=== Formation ===
The Confédération des associations tribales du Katanga was formed in November 1958 by Tshombe, Munongo, Dominique Diur, and others in response to the developing sociopolitical situation in Katanga Province, Belgian Congo. At the time, immigrants from other parts of the Congo, notably Lulua and Baluba people of Kasai Province, made up 38% of Katanga's population. The "authentic Katangese" referred to them disparagingly as "strangers".

The first president of CONAKAT was Munongo, who was quickly forced to cede leadership to Tshombe due to his work in the civil service. The CONAKAT ran in the national elections of 1960 on a regionalist program (including the demand for Katanga's self-government and preferential tax treatment). The party won only 8 of the 137 Congolese parliament seats in 1960.

On July 11, 1960, just under a fortnight after Congolese independence, CONAKAT president Tshombe declared the independence of the State of Katanga and the beginning of the Congo Crisis.

The party was also heavily subsidised by commercial and mining interests, especially Union Minière. The secession of Katanga from the rest of the Congo would enable these businesses to maintain their investments, as an example: Union Minière's net profits were 31 billion Belgian francs between 1950-1959, which corresponds to over 5,5 billion US dollars in 2020.

=== State of Katanga ===
CONAKAT became the dominant ruling party of the State of Katanga as it held 58 of the 64 seats in the National Assembly and the majority of cabinet positions.

The party ruled Katanga until 1963 when it was forced to surrender in the face of overwhelming UN and Congolese opposition.

=== Following the surrender ===
In 1965 following the re-annexation of Katanga into the Democratic Republic of Congo Tshombe became Prime Minister of the Congo and Munongo became Minister of the Interior. In the 1965 general election CONAKAT came second, receiving more than 178 thousand votes, 7.2% of the total vote. The party gained 9 seats in the National Assembly and was allied with the nationwide CONACO alliance led by Prime Minister Tshombe. The alliance won 80 seats but despite this Évariste Kimba, a former CONAKAT member but now Congolese Democratic Front leader, was appointed prime minister.

Joseph Mobutu seized power in a coup in November 1965 and would transform the Congo into a one-party state under his Popular Movement of the Revolution which forcibly dissolved CONAKAT along with every other political party.
