= Godefroid Munongo =

Congolese politician

- Born: 20 November 1925; Bunkeya, Belgian Congo
- Died: 28 May 1992 (aged 66)
- Occupation: Politician
- Children: Dominique Munongo
- Website: godefroidmunongo.com

Godefroid Munongo Mwenda M'Siri (20 November 1925 – 28 May 1992) was a Congolese politician. He was a minister and briefly interim president in 1961. It has been reported that he was involved in ethnic cleansing and in the assassination of Prime Minister Patrice Lumumba, during the Congo Crisis.

== Early life ==
Munongo was born on 20 November 1925 in Bunkeya (now in Lualaba Province). He was a descendant of King Msiri of the Nyamwezi, who founded the State of Garenganze in the latter half of the 19th century.

He entered the major seminary in Baudouinville in 1947, where he would stay for two years. In Kisantu, Munongo obtained his degree from the school of administrative sciences. He became a court clerk, then a police judge at the court responsible for identity cards. At the service of pensions, he became the head of the office, before becoming territorial agent in 1959.

Munongo was one of the founding members of the CONAKAT party, becoming its first president in October 1958. The Belgian authorities have pointed at the incompatibility between his functions, and had to step down as CONAKAT president in favour of Moïse Tshombe.

== Politics ==
By 1960, he was the second man in the nationalist CONAKAT party, alongside Moise Tshombe. Munongo was interim president of Katanga Province from 26 April to 22 June 1961.

Munongo was Minister of Interior for the Congo in 1965 and then led the eastern Katanga province until 24 April 1966, when the province merged with the neighbouring province of Lualaba. He was Governor of South Katanga until 5 November 1966.

It has been reported that he was involved in the ethnic cleansing of Kasaians from 1960 to 1962 in Katanga and tried to obtain Belgian support. It has been also alleged that Munongo was involved in the assassination of Lumumba in 1961. Before his death Munongo was quoted in a newspaper as saying that he would, if Lumumba came to Katanga, do what the Belgians could not do and kill him.

Lumumba and two other ministers were beaten on a plane journey to Katanga. Near the airport at Luano in Lubumbashi, they were all tortured, and Lumumba was personally assaulted by Katangan leaders, including Munongo and Belgian officers. After they were shot by a firing squad, their bodies were dissolved in acid. In reports Munongo said, "I will speak frankly, If people accuse us of killing Lumumba, I will reply: 'Prove it'." At the Conference Nationale Souveraine (CNS) shortly before his death, Auguste Mabika-Kalanda asked him, "Godefroid, you are one of the survivors who participated in the end of Patrice Émery Lumumba. Why would you not take advantage of the CNS to tell us your truth?" Munongo emotionally replied, "My dear Mabika, you put an important issue before me. What I can say at this stage is that I was not alone. We were numerous. We'll have to get all these people together. But anyway, I can say at that time, we were working, without realizing it, for the interests that were not ours. We were young". He died without ever fully recounting his role in Lumumba's death.

== Later life ==
Munongo was recognised, by the Council of Notables, as the fifth Msiri, and he was enthroned on 12 September 1976. The family website records that Munongo was going to break his silence on the death of Lumumba, but on the day of the announcement, he suffered a heart attack and died on 28 May 1992.

Munongo's son is involved in politics. So is his daughter Dominique Munongo.

== In popular culture ==
- In the 2000 film Lumumba, Munongo was played by Dieudonné Kabongo.
