= Kitenge (surname) =

Kitenge is a surname. Notable people with the surname include:

- Aime Kitenge (born 1975), Burundian footballer
- Gabriel Kitenge, Congolese and Katangese politician
- Joël Kitenge (born 1987), Luxembourgian footballer
