= Katangese Gendarmerie =

Military of the State of Katanga

Katangese Armed Forces
- Forces Armées Katangaises
- Flag
- Founded: 11 July 1960
- Disbanded: 21 January 1963 (remnants reconstituted as the FLNC)
- Service branches: Katangese Army; Katangese Air Force

Leadership
- Commander-in-Chief: President Moïse Tshombe
- Minister of Defense: Joseph Yav
- Commander: Jean-Marie Crèvecoeur (1st); Norbert Muké; Ferdinand Tshipola

Personnel
- Active personnel: 14,000–17,000 (1963)

Related articles
- History: Congo Crisis; Katanga insurgency

The Katangese Gendarmerie (French: Gendarmerie Katangaise), officially the Katangese Armed Forces (French: Forces Armées Katangaises), was the paramilitary force of the unrecognized State of Katanga in Central Africa from 1960 to 1963. The forces were formed upon the secession of Katanga from the Republic of the Congo with help from Belgian soldiers and former officers of the Force Publique. Belgian troops also provided much of the early training for the Gendarmerie, which was mainly composed of Katangese but largely led by Belgians and later European mercenaries.

Throughout the existence of the State of Katanga, the gendarmes sporadically fought various tribes and the Congolese National Army (ANC). In February 1961 the Gendarmerie initiated a series of operations aimed at suppressing anti-secessionist rebels of the Association Générale des Baluba du Katanga (BALUBAKAT) in northern Katanga. The campaign was largely successful, but the fighting led to atrocities and gendarmes were halted by forces of the United Nations Operation in the Congo (ONUC) during the Battle of Kabalo in April 1961. ONUC then initiated efforts to remove foreign mercenaries from the Gendarmerie, and launched Operation Rum Punch to arrest them in August 1961. They came into conflict with ONUC three times afterwards, in Operation Morthor (September 1961), Operation UNOKAT (December 1961), and Operation Grandslam (December 1962). Operation Grandslam marked the end of the Katangese secession in January 1963.

After the dissolution of the secessionist state, many gendarmes returned to civilian life or were integrated into the ANC. However, around 8,000 refused to do so, and many of these kept their arms and roamed North Rhodesia, Angola and Katanga. Many crossed the Congo border into Angola (then a Portuguese colony) where Portuguese colonial authorities assisted and trained them. They were involved in several mutinies and attempted invasions of the Congo, most notably the Stanleyville mutinies in 1966 and 1967.

After 1967, around 2,500 gendarmes were present in Angola, where they were reorganized as the Congolese National Liberation Front (FLNC) and fought in the Angolan War of Independence on the side of the Portuguese government against the Angolan nationalist movements of the Popular Movement for the Liberation of Angola (MPLA) and National Union for the Total Independence of Angola (UNITA). When the war ended in 1975, they fought in the Angolan Civil War against the National Liberation Front of Angola (FNLA). The FLNC was involved in the Shaba I and II attempted invasions of Katanga. Split into factions after the war, the tigres emerged and played a decisive role in the First Congo War. There has since been little gendarme presence, but they have emerged as a symbol of secessionist thinking.

== Origins ==
=== Background ===
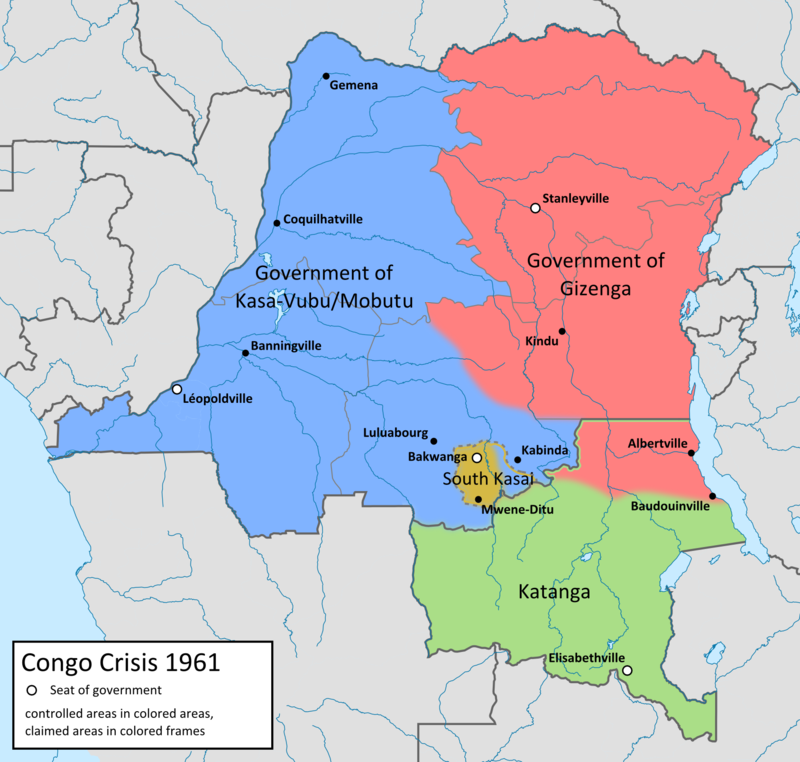
Map of the Congo with the State of Katanga in green

The Belgian Congo was established from the Congo Free State in 1908. Belgium retained control of the colony until it gained independence as the Republic of the Congo on 30 June 1960. Though the nation had elected officials including Joseph Kasa-Vubu as president, Patrice Lumumba as prime minister, and various bodies including a senate and assembly, upon independence its affairs quickly devolved into chaos. Congolese soldiers mutinied against their white commanders in the Force Publique on 5 July. This mutiny signaled the beginning of a large revolt and attacks on white people in the Congo. In response, Belgium sent troops into the region to maintain order and protect their commercial interests, without the permission of the Congolese state.

Largely in response to Belgian interference, on 11 July Katanga Province announced its secession from the Republic of the Congo under the leadership of Moise Tshombe. The state also represented Belgian mining interests. The State of Katanga began establishing the agencies necessary for a state to function independently, with a constitution and ministers. Lumumba called for United Nations (UN) intervention to end various secession movements in the country. The UN "called upon" Belgium to leave the Congo in Resolution 143 adopted on 14 July that also authorized the creation of the United Nations Operation in the Congo (ONUC), a multinational peacekeeping force aimed at helping "the Congolese government restore and maintain the political independence and territorial integrity of the Congo." By the end of July, 8,400 UN troops had been deployed to the Congo.

Dag Hammarskjöld, the Secretary-General of the United Nations, and Ralph Bunche, his special representative, believed that engaging in Katanga would result in fighting, and refused to allow peacekeepers to enter the region. In reality, Katanga at the time had an ill-trained fighting force, mainly made up of dozens of Belgian officers. United Nations Security Council Resolution 146, passed on 9 August, supplemented Resolution 143 and stated that "the entry of the United Nations Force into the province of Katanga is necessary for the full implementation of the present resolution". However, the resolution also mandated that the "United Nations Force in the Congo will not be a party to or in any way intervene in or be used to influence the outcome of any internal conflict, constitutional or otherwise." Frustrated, Lumumba appealed to Eastern Bloc nations for military assistance, resulting in his conflict with Kasa-Vubu and ultimately his removal from power in September and eventual murder in January 1961. In response to Lumumba's removal, his political allies gathered in Stanleyville in the eastern Congo and declared a rival regime to the central government in Léopoldville.

“During the entire month of August, a veritable race against the clock took place with the objective, for Tshombe and his advisers, of building a more or less efficient Katangan gendarmery before the eventual withdrawal of the Belgian troops.”— Belgian historian Jules Gérard-Libois

=== Formation ===
In order to develop a stronger fighting force, Katanga (with the help of Belgians) disarmed all Force Publique troops based in Camp Massart except for 350 Katangese soldiers. The first iteration of the army was planned to consist of 1,500 men, all Katangese. The first volunteers were primarily Lunda people from southern Katanga, who were organized by the Mwaant Yav and Tshombe's family. Throughout the year additional forces were recruited, including Luba warriors, 2,000 Bazela from Pweto, Bayeke from Bunkeya, and several white volunteers from Kaniama. By November, the Gendarmerie had 7,000 members. The army was largely organized, led, and trained by Belgians who were former Force Publique officers; the first commander of the Gendarmerie was Jean-Marie Crèvecoeur, appointed on 13 July. The majority of soldiers were Katangese. The forces were first called the "Katangese Armed Forces" in November 1960. Katanga also seized most of the assets of the Force Publique's air service, providing a nucleus for the Katangese Air Force. Joseph Yav, a native Katangese, was made minister of defence.

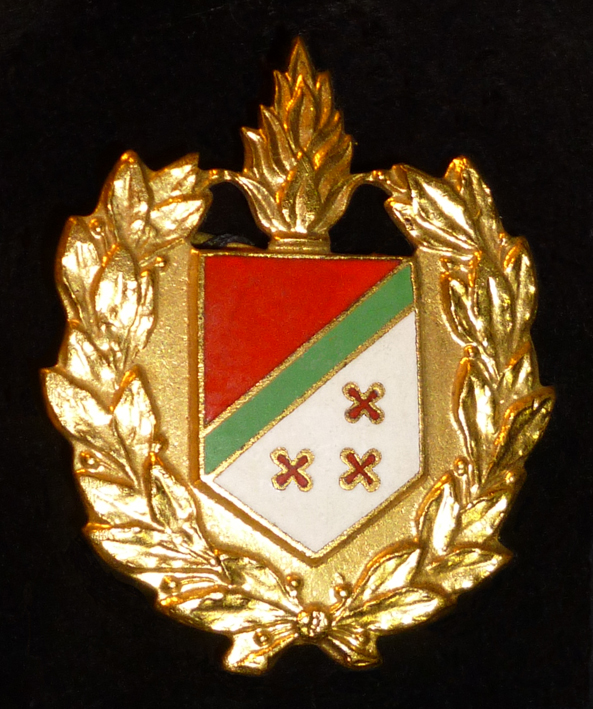
Cap Badge

Much of Gendarmerie's early organization was based on the Force Publique's organization, and it was characterized by rapid advancement of many soldiers. By January 1961 there were approximately 250 former Force Publique officers serving in the Gendarmerie. They occupied all senior leadership positions and part of their salaries was paid by the Belgian government under a technical assistance programme. There were also 30–40 officers of the Belgian Land Component officially on loan to the Katangese government who either held commands in the gendarmerie, staffed the Katangese Ministry of Defence, or served as advisers. Between 50 and 100 mercenaries of various nationalities were initially present, but over the course of 1961 the Katangese government increased recruitment efforts. Three Fouga trainer aircraft were also acquired. In August, most of the Belgian officers returned to Belgium, and mercenaries began training many of the soldiers. From its formation the force struggled with divisions between various white and black commanders. Belgian officers also protested the recruitment of Frenchmen. Though South Africa officially denied Katangese requests for arms, there is evidence of a covert program supplying weapons to the Gendarmerie.

== Katangese secession (1960–1963) ==
=== Early action and suppressing rebellion in northern Katanga ===
In the immediate aftermath of the Katangese secession, Katangese forces clashed with the Armée Nationale Congolaise (ANC) in the Kasai region. In August 1960 the region of South Kasai seceded from the Congo. The ANC launched an offensive and successfully occupied it, but the Gendarmerie and South Kasian forces successfully prevented them from making incursions into Katanga.

The Gendarmerie first saw major action in Northern Katanga in efforts to suppress the Association Générale des Baluba du Katanga (BALUBAKAT), a political party which represented the Luba people of the area and rebelled against Katangese authority. Some prominent BALUBAKAT politicians allied themselves with the Stanleyville government. On 17 October 1960, neutral zones were created in the region under a temporary agreement with the UN. In theory the region was controlled by ONUC contingents, but in reality the peacekeeping units were too weak to exercise authority. Because the rebellion threatened Katanga's communications, partially-trained soldiers and policemen were dispatched in units of around 60 people to the region to exert Katangese control. The inexperienced troops often resorted to pillaging and burning settlements. Political scientist Crawford Young suggested that the tactics were intentional and represented "little more than terrorization carried out by indiscriminate reprisals against whole regions."

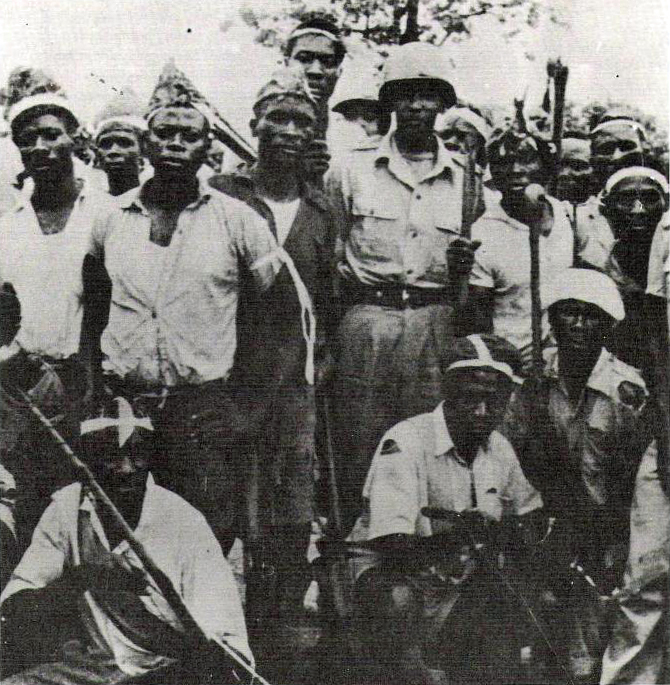
The Katangese Gendarmerie devoted significant effort to suppressing armed BALUBAKAT militia (pictured).

On 7 January 1961 troops from Stanleyville occupied Manono in northern Katanga. Accompanying BALUBAKAT leaders declared the establishing of a new "Province of Lualaba" that extended throughout the region. The ONUC contingents were completely surprised by the takeover in Manono. Tshombe and his government accused ONUC of collaborating with the Stanleyville regime and declared that they would no longer respect the neutral zone. By late January groups of Baluba were launching attacks on railways. UN officials appealed for them to stop, but the Baluba leaders stated that they aimed to do everything within their power to weaken the Katangese government and disrupt the Katangese Gendarmerie's offensive potential. On 21 February the UN Security Council passed a resolution permitting ONUC to use military force as a last resort to prevent civil war. As the Congo was already more-or-less in a state of civil war, the resolution gave ONUC significant latitude to act. It also called for the immediate departure of all foreign military personnel and mercenaries from the country, though the use of force was not authorised to carry out the measure. Therefore, force could only be used to remove foreign soldiers and mercenaries if it was justified under the reasoning that such action would be necessary to prevent civil war.

By February 1961 the Gendarmerie was composed of around 8,600 soldiers—8,000 Katangese and 600 Europeans. On 11 February, the Katangese government announced that it would begin an offensive to eliminate the Baluba opposition in northern Katanga. Approximately 5,000 troops were earmarked for the operation, which focused on a northward offensive from Lubudi. At the same time, they were to recapture Manono, secure the area south of it, and launch attacks on Kabalo from Albertville to the east and Kongolo to the north. The Gendarmerie subsequently launched operations Banquise, Mambo, and Lotus against the BALUBAKAT rebels.

The Gendarmerie then shifted their focus to Kabalo, where they chiefly intended to secure the railway. The town was garrisoned by two companies of an Ethiopian battalion serving with ONUC. On 7 April a Katangese plane carrying 30 mercenaries landed to secure the airstrip in the town, but were promptly arrested by the ONUC troops. Katangese forces moving by land attacked ONUC soldiers and fought with BALUBAKAT militia. The next day they sent an armed ferry up the river to seize the town, but ONUC forces destroyed it with a mortar, inflicting heavy casualties. The ONUC garrison played no further role in the fighting after 8 April. The Katangese made numerous attempts to enter Kabalo during the following days, but were bogged down by heavy resistance from Baluba militia. On 11 April Katangese troops withdrew from the area to focus their operations further south.

The captured mercenaries were interrogated by UN officials, and revealed to ONUC the extent to which Katanga had been recruiting mercenaries in southern Africa; and that recruiting stations were present in both the Federation of Rhodesia and Nyasaland and South Africa. Following questioning, the mercenaries were transferred to Léopoldville before being deported from the Congo to Brazzaville. The capture of the mercenaries was given a great deal of public attention and indicated that British nationals had been working in Katanga's employ. Due to the action of the ONUC garrison, Kabalo remained the only major town in northern Katanga not controlled by the Gendarmerie at the conclusion of their offensive. Though ONUC was able to retain control of the locale, it lacked the ability to patrol the surrounding area to intervene in further conflicts. Having been defeated, Katangese forces began punitive attacks on Baluba villages, opposed only by poorly armed bands of Baluba. In the resulting conflict both belligerents committed numerous atrocities.

=== Conflict with the United Nations ===
During the dissolution of the Lumumba Government, the Belgian government determined that their interests could be protected through negotiations with the Congolese government and began to gradually withdraw from Katanga. The state still had support from several Belgian politicians, such as René Clemens, the author of Katanga's constitution, and George Thyssens, who had drafted the Katangese declaration of independence and continued to serve as an important adviser. Additionally, companies such as Union Minière du Haut Katanga maintained relations with the state. Despite these interactions, the Belgian government gradually adopted a strategy of privately pressuring the Katangese to accept reintegration. Such efforts largely failed.

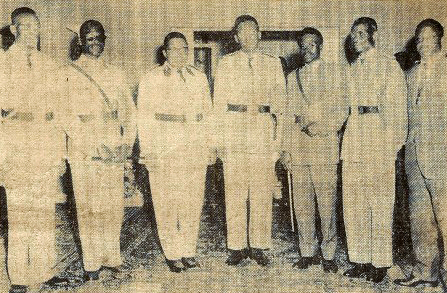
ANC and Katangese Gendarmerie officers with Congolese President Joseph Kasa-Vubu in 1961. Norbert Muké, future commander of the Gendarmerie, stands second from the left.

Under pressure from the United States and United Nations, Belgium removed many of its forces from the region between August and September 1961. However, many officers remained, without official Belgian endorsement, or became mercenaries. To support the Katangese, Belgium organized hundreds of Europeans to fight with Katanga as mercenaries. At the same time the UN attempted to suppress foreign support to the Gendarmerie; 338 mercenaries and 443 political advisers were expelled from the region by August. That same month, war veterans were first honored by the Katangese government. Dead soldiers were also remembered in ceremonies at the Cathedral of St. Peter and St. Paul in Élisabethville.

On 2 August 1961, Cyrille Adoula was appointed to replace Lumumba as prime minister of the Congo. He began a far more aggressive policy of ending Katanga's secession than the interim Congolese government, and Belgium continued to pressure the Katangese authorities to begin negotiations. Young suggested that "from this point onward, Katanga fought a mainly diplomatic and partly military rearguard action against what was in retrospect the inevitable end to the secession." After Adoula's appointment, sporadic violence continued between tribes and the government, but Katanga was relatively peaceful for several months.

The battle at Kabalo led to heightened tensions between the UN and the Katangese government. The failure of the UN to convince the Katangese to dispel mercenaries from its forces led ONUC to begin Operation Rum Punch in late August 1961 to peacefully arrest foreign members of the Gendarmerie. The operation was conducted successfully without violence, and by its end 81 foreign personnel of the Gendarmerie had been arrested in Katanga and brought to Kamina base to await deportation. Most of the remaining Belgian mercenaries reported to their consulate in Élisabethville. In addition to the arrests, two Sikorsky helicopters, three Aloutte helicopters, three Dakotas, four Doves, and two Herons of the Katangese Air Force were seized. The Belgian government agreed facilitate the repatriation of its nationals serving in the Gendarmerie, but in practice was only able to order the former Force Publique officers to return to Belgium under threat of losing their official ranks in the Belgian Army. The operation also did not extend to all military centers in Katanga. Thus, many foreign officers, particularly the highly committed "ultras" were able to avoid deportation. Further mercenary forces arrived in Katanga after the operation. British, Rhodesian, and South African fighters enlisted mostly for money and adventure, while the French mercenaries were regarded by UN officials as politically extreme. Colonel Norbert Muké, a native Katangese, was made commander of the Gendarmerie, but in practice its leadership was still heavily influenced by European mercenaries. Lieutenant Colonel Roger Faulques, a Frenchman, was made chief of staff, and he established a new headquarters near Kolwezi to coordinate anti-UN guerilla operations. The Gendarmerie continued to sporadically fight BALUBAKAT rebels until around September 1961.

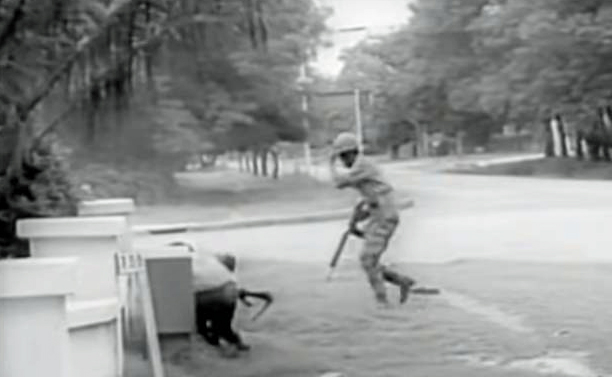
Katangese gendarmes in battle with ONUC troops, 1961

Relations between the UN and Katanga rapidly deteriorated in early September, and Katangese forces were placed on alert. Growing frustrated with Katanga's lack of cooperation and its continued employ of mercenaries, several ONUC officials planned a more forceful operation to establish their authority in Katanga. With the ultras in command and with its African members fearing their own disarmament in addition to that of the European mercenaries, the Gendarmerie moved additional troops to Élisabethville and began stockpiling weapons in private homes and offices for a defence. On 13 September, 1961, ONUC launched Operation Morthor, a second attempt to expel remaining Belgians, without consulting any Western powers. The forces seized various outposts around Élisabethville, and attempted to arrest Tshombe. The operation quickly turned violent after a sniper shot an ONUC soldier outside the post office while other peacekeepers were attempting to negotiate its surrender, and heavy fighting ensued there and at the radio station, in which over 20 gendarmes were killed under disputed circumstances. Due to miscommunication between ONUC commanders, Tshombe was able to avoid capture and flee to Northern Rhodesia.

Hammarskjöld and other top UN officials who had not been fully aware of the intentions of their subordinates were deeply embarrassed by the violence, which troubled Western powers who had supported the UN. Realising that the UN was in a precarious situation, Katangese leaders encouraged the Gendarmerie to increase its efforts and the conflict intensified over the following days. Strengthened with weapons provided by Rhodesia, the gendarmes launched mortar and sniper assaults on ONUC troops in Élisabethville, attacked ONUC garrisons throughout Katanga, and deployed the Katangese Air Force's single remaining Fouga to strafe and bomb ONUC positions. Gendarmes led by European officers besieged an Irish detachment in Jadotville and defeated UN relief efforts. Supporters of Katanga then began a propaganda campaign accusing ONUC of various human rights violations, and there were reports of UN attacks on civilian institutions. As Hammarskjöld flew to Ndola to meet with Tshombe and negotiate a peaceful end to the fighting, his plane crashed on 18 September, killing him. A few days later a cease-fire was reached. That month, Gendarmerie forces were estimated to number 13,000; mainly deployed in North Katanga, troops were also present in Manono, Albertville, Kongolo, Kolwezi, and Jadotville.

Katangese leaders hailed the cease-fire as a military victory; Muké was promoted to general, and the exploits of the native Katangese gendarmes were widely celebrated, though some soldiers became disgruntled over the fact that they did not control the army like the foreign personnel. A formal agreement between Katanga and the UN ensured the exchange of prisoners and forced ONUC to relinquish some of its positions in Élisabethville. With his government threatened by the UN's failure, Adoula ordered two battalions of the ANC to launch an offensive, but the Katangese forces repulsed them with a bombardment.

U Thant replaced Hammarskjöld as UN Secretary-General, and declared his support for the expulsion of the remaining mercenaries in the Gendarmerie. Security Council Resolution 169 was passed on 24 November 1961, affirming that the UN would "take vigorous action, including the use of the requisite measure of force, if necessary," to remove all "foreign military and paramilitary personnel and political advisers not under the United Nations Command, and mercenaries".

"Certainly every reasonable step should be taken to prevent the gendarmerie from becoming a lawless and undisciplined military organization." — United States Officer in Charge of U.N. Congo Affairs Charles S. Whitehouse

Throughout October and November the Gendarmerie was reinforced with additional mercenaries, munitions, and aircraft. As tensions rose, gendarmes harassed UN officials and murdered an ONUC officer. Skirmishes occurred in early December, and the Gendarmerie began isolating ONUC detachments around Élisabethville via a series of large roadblocks. On 5 December 1961, ONUC launched Operation Unokat, aimed at ensuring freedom of movement for ONUC personnel. Reinforced by additional troops and aircraft, UN forces quickly secured Élisabethville and destroyed four Katangese planes. Approximately 80 gendarmes were killed and 250 wounded in the fighting. Military pressure applied by the operation forced Tshombe to agree to negotiate with Adoula. Tshombe signed the Kitona Declaration on 21 December 1961, agreeing that Katanga was part of the Congo, and announcing plans to re-integrate the state with the Congo. Even as negotiations were in progress, the Gendarmerie continued to skirmish with the ANC. Throughout the year, the ANC made continuous inroads in North Katanga.

The United States began increasing efforts in retraining or reorganizing the Gendarmerie, as the Central Intelligence Agency feared that "Katanga forces are likely to resort to guerrilla type operations and could severely harass UN forces for some time" if the situation was not resolved peacefully. It was suggested that the gendarmes could be integrated into the ANC, but Tshombe resisted such efforts, complicating negotiations. Tshombe stalled, drawing out negotiations until October 1962, when ONUC intelligence indicated the Gendarmes were preparing for war.

=== Operation Grandslam ===
"There would have been no fighting at all [in Katanga] if the Katangese Gendarmerie had not made it unavoidable by indulging in senseless firing for several days."

— Statement by Secretary-General Thant before the UN Security Council on 31 December concerning ONUC's actions in Katanga

On 24 December 1962, Katangese forces in Élisabethville attacked ONUC troops with small arms fire and shot down an unarmed ONUC helicopter. Firing continued over the following days. After conversation with UN officials, Tshombe made an initial promise to end the fighting, but he subsequently ordered the Katangese Air Force to raid ONUC positions. Radio intercepts also revealed to the UN that Muké had ordered the air force to bomb the Élisabethville airport on the night of 29 December. With the failure to enact a ceasefire, Major General Dewan Prem Chand of India convinced Thant to authorise a strong, decisive offensive to pre-emptively eliminate Katangese forces.

ONUC launched Operation Grandslam on 28 December. On the first day, UN forces killed 50 Katangese gendarmes before securing downtown Élisabethville, (Note: This statistic is derived from the discovery of 50 bodies of Africans in the area after the fighting was over.) the local Gendarmerie headquarters, the radio station, and Tshombe's presidential palace. Early on 29 December, the ONUC Air Division launched a surprise assault on the Kolwezi airfield, inflicting serious damage to the installation's facilities. Further sorties resulted in the destruction of seven Katangese aircraft, though the Katangese Air Force managed to evacuate several planes to Angola. The Air Force remained grounded for the rest of the operation. At midday an ONUC formation advanced down the Kipushi road to sever the Katangese lines to Rhodesia. Gendarmes were well positioned in wooded heights overlooking the route, but following heavy mortar bombardment they surrendered with little opposition. Other ONUC forces seized the town of Kipushi without facing any resistance. Tshombe ordered a determined resistance to ONUC, and threatened to blow up bridges and dams if the operation was not halted within 24 hours.

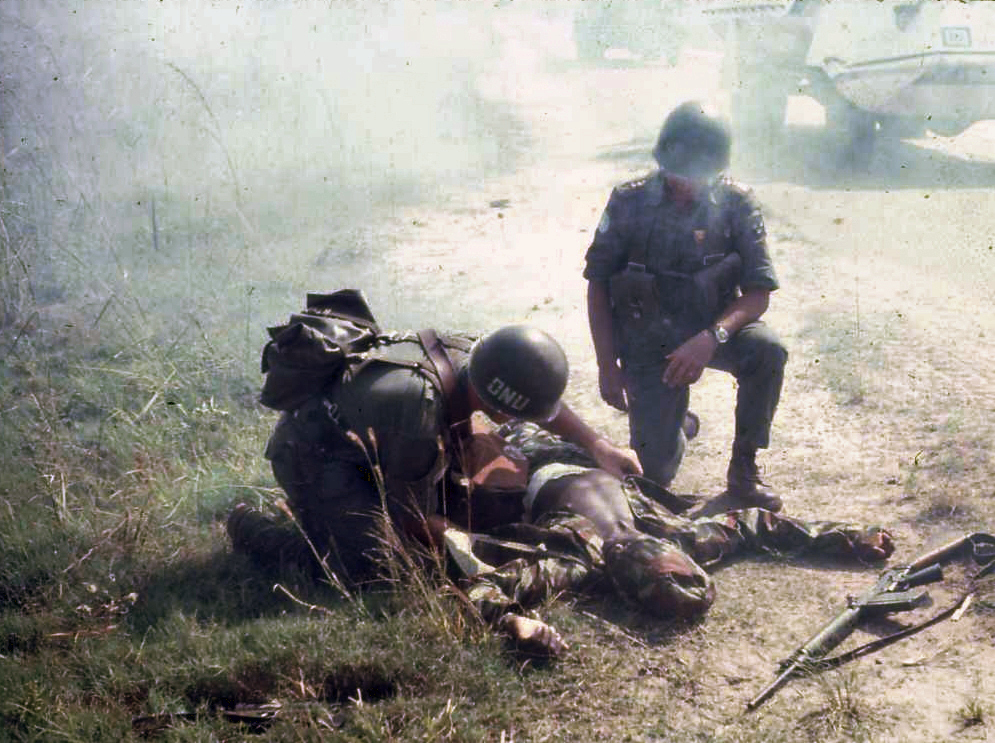
A wounded Katangese gendarme is treated by Swedish medics near Kamina

In Kamina, the gendarmes had expected an attack on 30 December, but when one failed to occur they began to drink beer and fire flares at random, possibly to boost morale. Rogue bands of gendarmes subsequently conducted random raids around the city and looted the local bank. They were attacked by Swedish and Ghanaian troops two or three kilometers northeast of Kamina the following day, and defeated. Gendarmerie conducted a disorganised withdrawal to two camps southeast of the locale. The Swedes successfully took several Gendarmerie camps and began working to stabilise the situation. Late that night a company of Indian Rajputana Rifles encountered entrenched gendarmes and mercenaries along Jadotville Road and a gunfight ensued. Two mercenaries captured during the clash revealed that Gendarmerie forces faced confusion and desertions. Overall Indian forces faced unexpectedly light resistance and reached the east bank of the Lufira River on 3 January 1963. Mercenaries withdrew to Jadotville the next day after destroying a bridge over the Lufira. UN forces found a bridge upstream and used rafts and helicopters to cross and neutralise opposition on the far side of the river, occupying Jadotville.

Muké attempted to organise a defence of the town, but Gendarmerie forces were in disarray, completely caught off-guard by the UN troops' advance. UN forces briefly stayed in Jadotville to regroup before advancing on Kolwezi, Sakania, and Dilolo. Between 31 December 1962 and 4 January 1963, international opinion rallied in favour of the ONUC. Belgium and France strongly urged Tshombe to accept Thant's Plan for National Reconciliation and resolve the conflict. On 8 January, Tshombe reappeared in Élisabethville. The same day Adoula received a letter from the chiefs of the most prominent Kantangese tribes pledging allegiance to the Congolese government and calling for Tshombe's arrest. Thant expressed interest in negotiating with Tshombe, saying "If we could convince [Tshombe] that there is no more room for maneuvering and bargaining, and no one to bargain with, he would surrender and the gendarmerie would collapse." Tshombe soon expressed his willingness to negotiate after being briefly detained and released, but warned that any advance on Kolwezi would result in the enactment of a scorched earth policy. Tshombe fled to Northern Rhodesia on a Rhodesian Air Force plane, and managed to reach Kolwezi, the only significant location that remained under Katangese control.

On 12 January a Swedish ONUC battalion surprised two Gendarmerie battalions in Kabundji, seized their weapons, and directed them to return to their civilian livelihoods. Meanwhile, mercenaries in the Kolwezi area had taken Tshombe's threats about a scorched earth policy seriously and planted explosives on all nearby bridges, the Nzilo Dam (which provided most of Katanga's electricity), and most UMHK mining facilities. UMHK officials privately told Tshombe they were withdrawing their support for secession. Muké vainly attempted to organise the 140 mercenaries and 2,000 gendarmes under his command to prepare a final defence of Kolwezi. His efforts, undermined by the force's low morale and indiscipline, were further hampered by an influx of refugees. Tshombe ordered the Katangese garrison of Baudouinville to surrender to besieging UN and ANC forces. Instead, they and most of the population deserted the city while a handful of gendarmes near Kongolo laid down their arms to Nigerian and Malaysian soldiers. On 14 January, Indian troops found the last intact bridge into Kolwezi. After a brief fight with gendarmes and mercenaries they secured it and crossed over, stopping at the city outskirts to await further instruction. At a final meeting with his mercenary commanders, Tshombe ordered all remaining Gendarmerie forces to withdraw to Angola. Mercenary Jean Schramme was appointed to be commander of an army in exile, while mercenary Jeremiah Puren was ordered to evacuate what remained of the Katangese Air Force, along with necessary military equipment and the Katangese treasury. This was accomplished via air and railway. Rhodesian operatives assisted in smuggling the gold reserves out of the country. The last of Schramme's mercenaries and gendarmes were evacuated on 25 January.

On 15 January, Tshombe sent a formal message to Thant, "I am ready to proclaim immediately before the world that the Katanga's secession is ended." He offered to return to Élisabethville to oversee the implementation of Thant's proposal for reunification if Adoula granted amnesty to himself and his government. At a press conference, Adoula accepted Tshombe's proposition and announced that what remained of the Gendarmerie would be integrated into the ANC. Total statistics on Gendarmerie and mercenary casualties from Operation Grandslam are unknown. Following the operation the UN was able to confirm that Angola, South Africa, and Northern Rhodesia had assisted the Katangese in arming their air force.

== Angola and Congo (1963–1967) ==
=== Exile, return, and fighting the Simba rebellion ===
After the defeat of the State of Katanga, plans to disarm or integrate the gendarmes were made. On 8 February 1963, Muké and several of his officers pledged their allegiance to Kasa-Vubu. However, of the estimated 14,000–17,000 gendarmes, only 3,500 registered for integration, and only around 2,000–3,000 became part of the ANC. Those who integrated suffered threats and violence, and were given lower ranks. An estimated 7,000 returned to civilian life, and a further 8,000 escaped disarmament. Of the 8,000, some found work in security, and thousands of others were reported to be roaming "in the bush in South Katanga". Many could not return to their homes, and were considered outcasts.

Meanwhile, the Congolese government seized documents revealing that Tshombe was maintaining contact with foreign mercenaries. Fearing arrest and claiming political persecution, he fled to Paris, France, in June 1963, eventually settling in Madrid, Spain. From there he developed plans with his Gendarmerie commanders for a return to power, further complicating the central government's efforts to absorb the force. UN efforts at reconciliation were ended as ONUC focused on withdrawing its own forces from Katanga in December 1963. The ANC began raiding pro-secession communities, as gendarmes continued to roam Northern Rhodesia, Angola and Katanga. The gendarmes in the Congo-Rhodesia border region would go into Rhodesian communities to barter for food and sometimes raid and steal supplies. Since most of the local Rhodesian residents were Lunda, many of the Lunda Katangese avoided the ANC security operations by simply disguising themselves in the indigenous communities.

Tshombe's government had enjoyed close relations with the administrators of Angola, particularly since both were opposed to communism. Nevertheless, the Portuguese were initially overwhelmed by the large number of gendarmes and mercenaries that arrived under Schramme. As the Congolese government had given backing to the National Liberation Front of Angola, a nationalist anti-colonial rebel group, the Portuguese concluded that the gendarmes could serve as a counterweight to nationalist agitation and accommodated them in Luso. As more gendarmes gathered in Angola in late 1963, additional camps were established at Cazambo, Cazage, Lutai, and Lunguebungo. Mindful of the international ramifications of harbouring an armed group, the Portuguese portrayed the gendarmes and mercenaries as "refugees". While most of the standard personnel lived in squalor and lacked basic necessities, the officers were kept in hotel rooms paid for by Tshombe. Many were not paid while in exile. A new command structure was established for the Gendarmerie in Angola under Major Ferdinand Tshipola with Antoine Mwambu as chief of staff. Four groups operated autonomously under their own mercenary commanders. Schramme completely rejected Tshipola's authority. By 1964, two of the camps had become dedicated training facilities. Mercenaries traveled from Katanga to Angola via Rhodesia to relay messages between Tshombe, the gendarmes, and the mercenaries, with logistical support from Southern Rhodesia.

From exile, Tshombe continued to plot his return to power in Katanga by use of the mercenaries and ex-gendarmes. He made entreaties to leftist Congolese dissidents in Brazzaville, causing consternation in the Congolese government. By April 1964 an additional 3,000–4,000 Katangese had crossed into Angola and joined the gendarmes, and Tshombe was directing the re-mobilization of the force. However, that year two leftist rebellions overtook the Congolese government; one in the Kwilu region and another in the east, waged by the "Simbas." With the ANC lacking cohesion, Adoula's government was unable to handle the insurrections. Tshombe was invited to return to the Congo to assist in negotiating a political solution, and in July 1964 he was installed as prime minister with the hope that he could reach an agreement with the rebels and that his presence would ensure no new secession attempts in Katanga.

Immediately after becoming prime minister, Tshombe recalled some of the gendarmes in Angola back to the Congo to suppress the insurrections. These gendarmes, expecting to reignite the secession, were surprised by their new task and only took orders directly from Tshombe. Some of the units also clashed with one another, due to rivalries between Katangese and mercenary officers. A couple thousand remained in Angola. Tsombe's government also recruited former gendarmes in Jadotville and Élisabethville, who reenlisted primarily to regain their pay. These forces formed their own units which were then tendentiously integrated into the ANC. At least 6,000 additional ex-gendarmes were integrated into the police force of the new province of South Katanga. With support from Belgium and the United States, the gendarmes made steady progress in recapturing territory in late 1964. By 1965 they were deployed in mopping-up operations. The use of mercenaries bothered Kasa-Vubu, which created divisions with the commander of the ANC, Joseph-Désiré Mobutu, who appreciated their effectiveness. Kasa-Vubu also developed a rivalry with Tshombe, and in October 1965 dismissed him from the premiership. Political deadlock ensued as Parliament refused to approve Kasa-Vubu's new appointee to the premiership, and in November Mobutu launched a coup and assumed the presidency. Tshombe returned to exile in Spain and resumed planning for a return to power. New mercenaries were recruited for the purpose with Portuguese support.

=== Rebellions and return to exile ===
By mid-1966 the Katangese forces in the Congo were still serving in the ANC in standalone units. About 1,000 mercenaries and 3,000 former gendarmes were deployed in South Kivu and Kisangani (formerly Stanleyville), tasked with suppressing the remaining Simba rebels. They were militarily effective, but retained significant political distance from Mobutu's new regime and had tense relations with the regular ANC units. In July 1966 roughly 3,000 gendarmes and 240 mercenaries, upset about irregular pay, rebelled in Kisangani. Led by Tshipola, since made a colonel, the force seized control of the city and killed several ANC officers including Colonel Joseph-Damien Tshatshi, the commander responsible for Congolese police operations in Katanga in 1963. Tshipola issued a memo accusing Tshatshi of discriminating against the ex-gendarmes and denouncing Mobutu's coup. Other mercenaries revolted in Isiro and Watso before joining Tshipola's force in Kisangani. The insurrection was suppressed in September with the assistance of units led by mercenary Bob Denard and Schramme. Following this, several ex-gendarmes—including members of the Katangese police—fled to Angola.

In March 1967 Mobutu convened a military tribunal to try the ex-gendarmes responsible for the mutiny. Tshombe was also tried in absentia. The tribunal sentenced Tshombe to death and criminalized the Gendarmerie retrospectively as an "irregular army". Mobutu held the Gendarmerie to be a criminal organization for the remainder of his rule. After the trial, all the gendarmes were referred to as 'mercenaries' by Congolese press. Tshombe's plans to use the remaining gendarmes and mercenaries to stage a rebellion were disrupted by the hijacking of his plane in June and ultimate detention in Algiers. A second wave of mutinies broke out on 5 July 1967, in Bukavu and Kisangani after it was revealed that the ANC planned to disband its mercenary units. The mutinies were led by European mercenaries. An estimated 600 former gendarmes led by Schramme were present in Kisangani during the mutiny. Under pressure from the ANC, Schramme was forced to evacuate the city with 300 mercenaries and a few thousand gendarmes. They reached Bukavu, and a secessionist state was declared. A plan was proposed by the International Red Cross to evacuate 950 gendarmes and around 650 of their dependents to Zambia. Schramme and Mobutu objected, and the plan did not go forward. Though the ANC continued fighting, around 900 gendarmes gave up their arms and crossed into Rwanda. At the end of the mutinies, the gendarmes agreed to a cease-fire proposed by Organisation of African Unity Secretary General Diallo Telli under which they could gain amnesty by returning to the Congo. The mercenaries were expelled from Africa and returned to Europe. A brief diversionary raid was executed by Denard from 1-5 November 1967. Called "Operation Luciver", ex-gendarmes crossed from Angola to Katanga and occupied Kisenge and Mutshatsha before being defeated by the ANC. In the Congo, reprisal raids against former gendarmes then occurred; the ANC killed several of their leaders.

== Later history (1967–present) ==
"We cannot by any means support a political and military adventure in Katanga without it being useful to our own policy. [...] [W]ithout this we will be in difficulty in our own fight against subversion." – PIDE statement, June 1968

The straggling gendarmes who returned to Angola after the defeats in the Congo initially maintained the hope of fighting for their return within a few years. This plan was nevertheless disrupted by Tshombe's detention, the departure of many mercenary commanders, and the increasing strength of Mobutu. The gendarmes were instead deployed by the Portuguese government in the Eastern Military Zone, where they were led by Nathaniel Mbumba and fought the Movimento Popular de Libertação de Angola (MPLA) and União Nacional para a Independência Total de Angola (UNITA) during the Angolan War of Independence. The Portuguese had high respect for the gendarmes' abilities— they were called Fiéis or "the faithful". However, historian Pedro Aires Oliveira notes that the gendarmes cared more about fighting the Democratic Republic of the Congo than participating in the Angolan war and as a result were closely watched by the Portuguese authorities. 1,130 ex-gendarmes were deployed at Gafaria, and a further 1,555 at Camissombo. Some of the gendarmes were also given bounties by the De Beers diamond company for disrupting smuggling operations in Angola.

Efforts began to formalize the presence of exiled gendarmes in Angola. In March 1968, the Fédération Nationale Congolaise was created to represent Katangese in exile. In June 1969, the Congolese National Liberation Front (FLNC) was founded. They were given further military training and in May 1971, many gendarmes began formally receiving compensation for fighting. Mbumba negotiated better conditions, training, and salaries for the soldiers in the early 1970s. In February 1971 they were formally made part of the Portuguese irregular forces. By 1974 there were an estimated 2,400 gendarmes in 16 companies.

During the Angolan Civil War (from 1975 to 2002), the FLNC, composed of ex-gendarmes called the "Tigres", fought on the side of the MPLA against the National Liberation Front of Angola (FNLA). The FLNC was then involved in the Shaba Wars. Katanga Province had been renamed Shaba Province during the rule of Mobutu, when the Congo was known as Zaire. Shaba I began on 8 March 1977, when ex-gendarmes invaded the province. Western nations came to the aid of Mobutu, and the invasion was crushed by 26 May. On 11 May 1978, a second invasion, known as Shaba II began. About 3,000 to 4,000 FLNC members were involved. Western nations again supported Mobutu, and the FLNC was largely defeated by 27 May. After the invasion failed, the FLNC lost Angola's support, and promptly collapsed. Some former gendarmes were incorporated into the Angolan army, where they were occasionally deployed militarily. Various groups were formed to succeed the FLNC, including the FAPAK, the MCS, and the FLNC II. The factions were divided by their goals.

The Tigres were involved in the First Congo War, supporting a rebellion against Mobutu. In February 1997, 2,000 to 3,000 were airlifted to Kigali and driven to Goma and Bukavu. Their fighting contributed heavily towards the capture of Kisangani and "sped up" the rebellion. Historian Gérard Prunier concludes that the Tigres played a "decisive role in the war." In May 1997 Mobutu was overthrown and replaced by Laurent-Désiré Kabila. After the war, the Tigres were largely incorporated into the Armed Forces of the Democratic Republic of the Congo. The concept of the Tigres has emerged in the Democratic Republic of the Congo as a symbolic force representing secessionist thinking.

== Order of Battle ==
- 21st–24th, 33th and 34th Battalions de Gendarmerie,
- 1st Battalion d’Inf Portée,
- 1st Para-Commando Battalion (aka: 1st Commando)
- 1st Police Militaire (three companies)
- 1st Garde Mobile Battalion
- Four ‘mobile groups’ lettered A–D,
- Peloton de Garde Présidentielle
- Unité Européen (50 men)
- sundry service units
- ‘Tanganyika Flotilla’

== Equipment inventory (1960–1963) ==
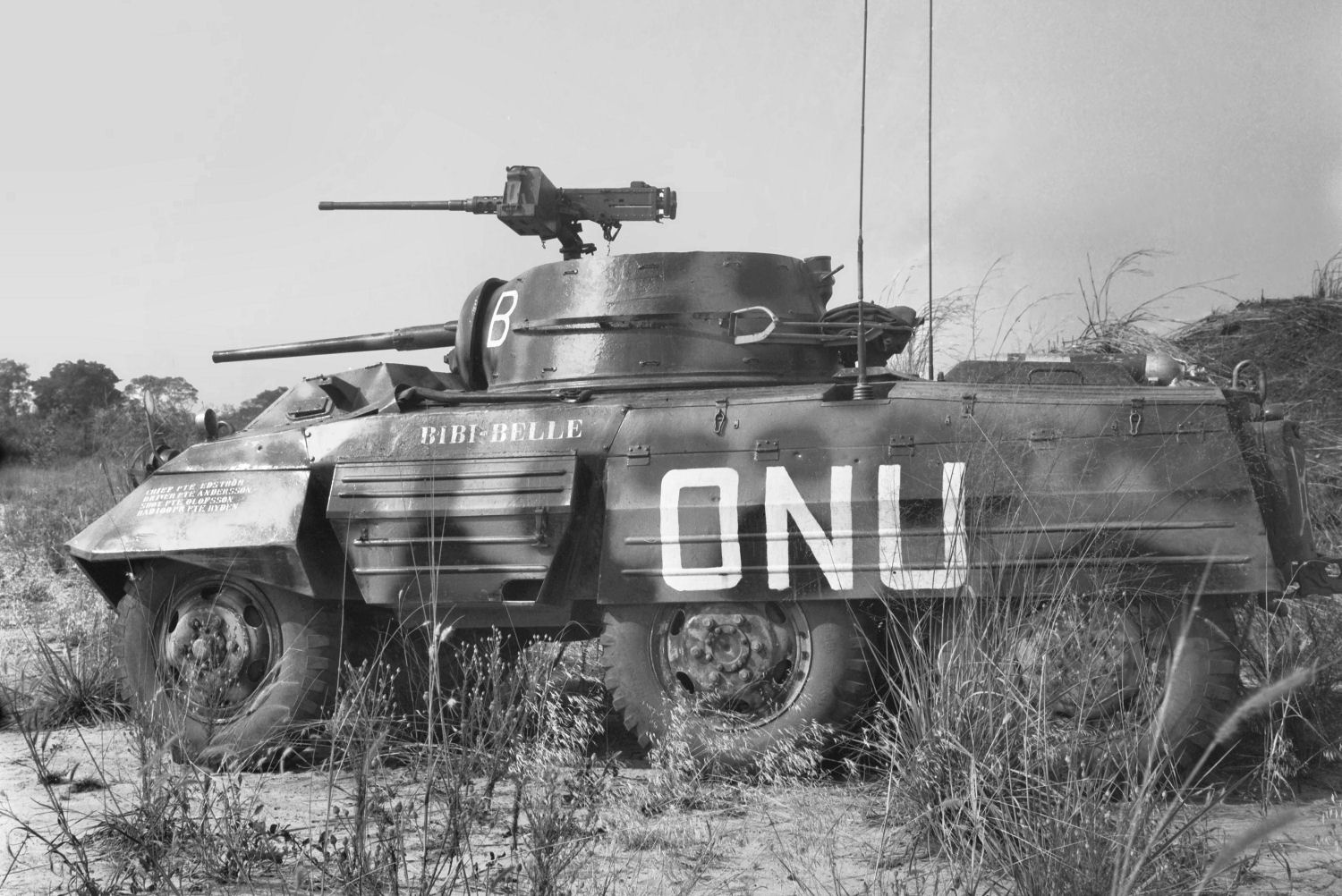
A captured Katangese M8 Greyhound

Small arms

- Mauser rifles (FN Mle 24/30)
- FN FAL
- Vigneron submachine gun
- Sten submachine gun

Machine guns

- FN MAG
- M1919 Browning machine gun
- M2 Browning

Mortars

- 60 mm mortar
- 81 mm mortar

Artillery

- 75 mm caliber recoilless rifle
- Canon de 75 modèle 1897

Anti-Aircraft

- Bofors 40 mm gun (referred to as Beaufort)

Vehicles

- M8 Greyhound
- Minerva built Land Rover

== See also ==
- Mai-Mai Kata Katanga (2011–present)

== Bibliography ==
- Arnold, Guy (26 November 1999). Mercenaries: Scourge of the Developing World. Springer. ISBN 978-1-349-27708-7.
- Boulden, Jane (2001). Peace Enforcement: The United Nations Experience in Congo, Somalia, and Bosnia (illustrated ed.). Greenwood Publishing Group. ISBN 9780275969066.
- Burns, Arthur Lee; Heathcote, Nina (1963). Peace-keeping by U.N. Forces : From Suez to the Congo. Princeton Studies in World Politics. Vol. 4. New York & London: Frederick A. Praeger. OCLC 186378493.
- Colvin, Ian (1968). The Rise and fall of Moise Tshombe: a Biography. London: Frewin. ISBN 9780090876501.
- Cordier, Andrew Wellington; Harrelson, Max, eds. (2013). Public Papers of the Secretaries General of the United Nations. Vol. 6. Columbia University Press. ISBN 9780231513807.
- Dixon, Jeffrey S.; Sarkees, Meredith Reid (22 October 2015). A Guide to Intra-state Wars. SAGE. ISBN 978-0-87289-775-5.
- Dorn, A. Walter (2016). Air Power in UN Operations: Wings for Peace. Military Strategy and Operational Art. Routledge. ISBN 9781317183396.
- Epstein, Howard M. (1965). Revolt in the Congo, 1960–1964. New York: Facts on File. OCLC 875482690.
- Genser, Jared; Ugarte, Bruno Stagno (5 June 2014). The United Nations Security Council in the Age of Human Rights. Cambridge University Press. ISBN 978-1-107-04007-6.
- Gérard-Libois, Jules (1967). Katanga Secession. University of Wisconsin Press. ISBN 978-0-299-04200-4. OCLC 209775045.
- Harvey, Dan (2011). A Company Action: The battle for the tunnel. Dunboyne: Maverick House. ISBN 978-1-907221-40-8.
- Harvey, Dan (7 January 2015). A Company Action: The battle for the tunnel. Maverick House. ISBN 978-1-907221-40-8.
- Higgins, Rosalyn (1980). United Nations Peacekeeping, 1946-1967: Africa. Vol. 3. Oxford University Press. ISBN 9780192183217.
- Hoskyns, Catherine (1965). The Congo Since Independence: January 1960 – December 1961. London: Oxford University Press. OCLC 414961.
- Larmer, Miles; Kennes, Erik (8 August 2014). "Rethinking the Katangese Secession" (PDF). The Journal of Imperial and Commonwealth History. 42 (4): 741–761. doi:10.1080/03086534.2014.894716. hdl:2263/49135. ISSN 0308-6534. S2CID 145205024.
- Kennes, Erik; Larmer, Miles (2016). The Katangese Gendarmes and War in Central Africa: Fighting Their Way Home. Indiana University Press. ISBN 978-0-253-02130-4.
- Lefever, Ernest W.; Joshua, Wynfred (1966). United Nations Peacekeeping in the Congo: 1960–1964. Vol. 3. Washington, D.C.: Brookings Institution. OCLC 631685344.
- Lipsey, Roger (2013). Hammarskjöld: A Life (illustrated ed.). University of Michigan Press. ISBN 9780472118908.
- Meisler, Stanley (2011). United Nations: A History (revised ed.). Grove Press. ISBN 9780802194992.
- Miller, Linda B. (2015). World Order and Local Disorder: The United Nations and Internal Conflicts. Princeton University Press – via Project MUSE.
- Meditz, Sandra W.; Merrill, Tim (1993). Library of Congress Country Study Zaire 1993. Library of Congress.
- Mockaitis, Thomas R. (1999). Peace Operations and Intrastate Conflict: The Sword Or the Olive Branch? (illustrated ed.). Greenwood Publishing Group. ISBN 9780275961732.
- Namikas, Lise (2013). Battleground Africa: Cold War in the Congo, 1960–1965. Washington, D.C.: Woodrow Wilson Center Press. ISBN 978-0-8047-8486-3.
- Nzongola-Ntalaja, Georges (2007). The Congo, From Leopold to Kabila: A People's History (3rd ed.). New York: Palgrave. ISBN 978-1-84277-053-5.
- O'Ballance, Edgar (1999). The Congo-Zaire Experience, 1960–98 (illustrated ed.). Springer. ISBN 9780230286481.
- O'Brien, Conor Cruise (1962). To Katanga And Back - A UN Case History. London: Hutchinson. OCLC 460615937.
- Othen, Christopher (2015). Katanga 1960–63: Mercenaries, Spies and the African Nation that Waged War on the World (illustrated ed.). The History Press. ISBN 9780750965804.
- Passemiers, Lazlo (14 January 2016). "Safeguarding White Minority Power: The South African Government and the Secession of Katanga, 1960–1963". The State, the Citizen and Power. 68: 70–91.
- Power, Declan (2016). Siege at Jadotville: The Irish Army's Forgotten Battle (unabridged ed.). Blackstone Publishing. ISBN 9781504758888.
- Puren, Jerry; Pottinger, Brian (1986). Mercenary Commander. Golago. ISBN 9780947020217.
- Sonck, Jean-Pierre & Despas, Daniel (January 1996). "L'aviation katangaise (1^{e} partie)" [Katangan Aviation]. Avions: Toute l'aéronautique et son histoire (in French) (34): 2–6. ISSN 1243-8650.
- Sonck, Jean-Pierre & Despas, Daniel (February 1996). "L'aviation katangaise (2^{e} partie)". Avions: Toute l'aéronautique et son histoire (in French) (35): 2–7. ISSN 1243-8650.
- Sonck, Jean-Pierre & Despas, Daniel (March 1996). "L'aviation katangaise (3^{e} partie)". Avions: Toute l'aéronautique et son histoire (in French) (36): 2–6. ISSN 1243-8650.
- Urquhart, Brian (1998). Ralph Bunche: An American Life (illustrated ed.). W. W. Norton & Company. ISBN 9780393318593.
- United Press International (9 January 1963). "Congo War At an End – Tshombe". The Desert Sun. Élisabethville. p. 2. OCLC 26432381.
- United Press International (5 January 1963). "U.N. Troop Fighting All of Plan – Bunche Indicates That Drive Will Go On to Kolwezi". The Desert Sun. Léopoldville. p. 2.
- Williams, Susan (2014). Who Killed Hammarskjold?: The UN, the Cold War and White Supremacy in Africa. Oxford University Press. ISBN 9780190257637.
- Young, Crawford (8 December 2015). Politics in Congo: Decolonization and Independence. Princeton University Press. ISBN 978-1-4008-7857-4.
