= Lomami =

Lomami may refer to:

- Lomami River, a river in the Democratic Republic of the Congo
- Lomami Province, a province of the Democratic Republic of the Congo
- Lomami Province (former), a former province of Zaire
