= Gabriel Kitenge =

Congolese politician

Secretary of State of Public Works of the State of Katanga
- In office October 1960 – 21 January 1963 (end of the secession)

Personal details
- Born: Katanga Province, Democratic Republic of the Congo
- Political party: Union congolaise

Gabriel Kitenge was a Congolese and Katangese politician.

== Early life ==
Gabriel Kitenge was a Songye from Katanga Province. In 1957, Kitenge founded, together with Belgian lawyer Antoine Rubbens and Director of mining company Union Minière du Haut-Katanga Jules Cousin, one of the first political parties of the Congo, namely Union congolaise. He was the head of his party's delegation at the Belgo-Congolese Round Table Conference in order to prepare the transition towards independence. Partly because of its European roots, Union congolaise. was never successful. The party obtained one seat during the elections in May 1960 right before independence. Kitenge was put forward by the CONAKAT political party as a Senator in June 1960.

== Independent Congo and Katangese secession ==
Eleven days after Congolese independence from Belgium, on 11 July 1960, President of the Provincial Assembly Moïse Tshombe declared the independence of the State of Katanga. At the start of the secession, four delegations were sent out to explain the government's point of view. The second delegation, led by Minister of Foreign Affairs Évariste Kimba, included Kitenge, Albert Nyembo, Cyprien Kayumba Mfumu wa Bwana, Léonard Kanyangala, and an ordinance officer, and left for Europe at the start of August. Five Secretariats of State were created in October 1960, thereby enlarging the government. Kitenge and other leaders of Union congolaise supported Tshombe. He became the Secretary of State of Public Works. His Chef de cabinet was Jean Vandekerkhove and deputy Chef de cabinet was Raphaël Kitenge Senga.

Although the several testimonies regarding the assassination of first Congolese Prime Minister Patrice Lumumba differ regarding the presence of Katangese government Ministers, Kitenge was certainly present during the assassination of Lumumba, Maurice Mpolo, and Joseph Okito, as well as during the mistreatment of the prisoners at the Brouwez farmhouse beforehand. On the day when the prisoners were transferred from Léopoldville to Élisabethville, Kitenge was doing a few test rounds of Austrian jeeps, together with Minister of Finance Jean-Baptiste Kibwe. Interior Minister Godefroid Munongo, on his way to Luano airport, told Kibwe that "three packages" would be delivered, namely the three Léopoldville politicians. Later that day, Kitenge and Kibwe attended the execution of Lumumba and his two colleagues, about sixty kilometres from Élisabethville. They were further accompanied by their colleagues Tshombe, Évariste Kimba, as well as Belgian officers.

In August 1961, a delegation consisting of Kitenge and Kibwe visited South Africa and met with Minister of Foreign Affairs Eric Louw.

== After the end of the Katangese secession ==
After the end of the Katangese secession, Kitenge became an entrepreneur. He founded a bar in Likasi with an orchestra called Kite-Jazz and established a transport firm called Kite-trans.

In 1964, Kitenge unsuccessfully ran for Provincial President of Lomami against Dominique Manono.

In 1991, during the National Sovereign Conference, Kitenge testified about his responsibility in Lumumba's assassination.

== Publications ==
- Kitenge, Gabriel (1958-09-01). "Élargissons le public des Spectacles Populaires". Katanga. No. 17. p. 9.
- Kitenge, Gabriel (1957). Ujanja wa Mtumwa. Pièce en quatre tableaux. Représentée les 9 et 10 mars 1957 à Eville par l'Unité scoute Saint Boniface dans le cadre du Challenge perpétuel d'art dramatique. Élisabethville.
