= Katangese Tigers =

The Katangese Tigers or the Tigres are Katangese fighters.

The term originally referred to ex-members of the Katangese Gendarmerie who refused to surrender after the State of Katanga's collapse in 1963. These former soldiers fled to Angola in the 1960s. They formed a rebel group, the Congolese National Liberation Front (FLNC), in the 1970s. However, the FLNC was unsuccessful in overthrowing Zaire's government or retaking Katanga, and consequently fractured. Several FLNC fighters and ex-gendarmes made peace with Zaire's dictator Mobutu Sese Seko and joined his security forces. Afterwards, the term "Katangese Tigers" was used to refer to Katangese militants who continued to oppose Mobutu; these fought alongside the Alliance of Democratic Forces for the Liberation of Congo in the First Congo War. After Mobutu's overthrow, these "Tigers" then became an elite force within the Armed Forces of the Democratic Republic of the Congo, loyal to President Laurent-Désiré Kabila.

== Sources ==
- Abbott, Peter (2014). Modern African Wars (4): The Congo 1960–2002. Oxford; New York City: Osprey Publishing. ISBN 978-1-78200-076-1.
- Erik Kennes (March 1998). La guerre du Congo (PDF). Archived from the original (PDF) on 2018-10-06.
- Kennes, Erik; Miles, Larmer (2016). The Katangese Gendarmes and War in Central Africa: Fighting Their Way Home. Bloomington; Indianapolis: Indiana University Press. JSTOR j.ctt1cg4n48.
- Filip Reyntjens (November 2009). The Great African War Congo and Regional Geopolitics, 1996–2006 (PDF). Cambridge University Press. p. 340. ISBN 9780521111287.
