= Operation Rum Punch =

1961 UN action of the Congo Crisis

- Part of the Congo Crisis
- Élisabethville (Democratic Republic of the Congo)
- Location: Élisabethville and various localities in northern Katanga
- Commanded by: Conor Cruise O'Brien; K.A.S. Raja
- Objective: Arrest of European mercenaries employed by the State of Katanga
- Date: 28 August 1961; 04:00 – 15:00
- Executed by: ONUC (Note: Numerous national forces participated in ONUC, the United Nations Operation in the Congo. For Operation Rum Punch, this included troops from India, Ireland, Sweden, and Ghana.)
- Outcome: 79 European mercenaries and officers of Katanga arrested; 14 Katangese aircraft seized
- Casualties: 1 ONUC soldier wounded (Note: One Swedish officer was grazed by friendly fire.)

Operation Rum Punch or Operation Rampunch was a military action undertaken by United Nations peacekeeping forces on 28 August 1961 against the military of the State of Katanga, a secessionist state from the Republic of the Congo in central Africa. UN troops arrested 79 foreign mercenaries and officers employed by Katanga with little conflict.

== Background ==
=== Katanga's secession ===
The Republic of the Congo became independent from Belgium on 30 June 1960. On 5 July, disgruntled soldiers of the Force Publique, unhappy with their lack of advancement relative to civilian politicians, began a nationwide mutiny against their white officers. The rebellions caused widespread instability and led to the flight of much of the Congo's European population, which was of vital importance to the economy. On July 9 the mutinies spread to the southern province of Katanga. Katanga contained the vast majority of the Congo's valuable mineral resources and had attracted significant mining activity under Belgian rule. Many Katangese thought that they were entitled to the revenue generated through the lucrative industry, and feared that under the new central government led by Prime Minister Patrice Lumumba it would be redistributed among the Congo's poorer provinces.

The remaining settlers in Katanga, the Belgian government, and members of the nativist Confédération des associations tribales du Katanga (CONAKAT), the ruling party in the Katangese provincial government, blamed Lumumba and his alleged communist sympathies for the collapse in order. With Lumumba refusing to accept the direct intervention of Belgian troops, elements of the Belgian government began pushing for the creation of a separate Katangese state through which European mining interests could be protected. On 11 July Belgian metropolitan units were landed across the Congo, without the Congolese government's consent, to disarm the mutinous troops. That evening Moïse Tshombe, President of Katanga Province, citing the collapse of order in the Congo and the threat of a communist takeover, declared the independence of the "State of Katanga" and appealed for Belgian assistance. On 12 July Lumumba and President Joseph Kasa-Vubu appealed to the United Nations (UN), requesting that international troops be dispatched to the Congo to replace the Belgian forces and reestablish order. The UN Security Council complied, passing several resolutions calling for the withdrawal of Belgian troops and establishing a large multinational peacekeeping mission, the United Nations Operation in the Congo (known by its French acronym, ONUC).

Lumumba demanded that ONUC troops be used to forcibly put down the Katangese secession. The Security Council resolved on 9 August that "the entry of the United Nations Force into the province of Katanga is necessary for the full implementation of this resolution" while also deciding that "the United Nations Force in the Congo will not be a party to or in any way intervene in or be used to influence the outcome of any internal conflict." The mobilisation of a Katangese army, dubbed the Katangese Gendarmerie, troubled UN Secretary-General Dag Hammarskjöld, who felt that an armed confrontation would violate ONUC's mandate. Frustrated, Lumumba appealed to Eastern Bloc nations for military assistance, resulting in a conflict with Kasa-Vubu and ultimately his removal from power in September and eventual murder in January 1961.

=== Katangese forces ===
Immediately following the declaration of secession, the Katangese government worked to quickly establish its own armed force. Belgian officers and Katangese rank-and-file of the Force Publique formed the nucleus of the new Katangese Gendarmerie, bolstered by the recruitment of tribal warriors. By 26 November 1960 the force consisted of about 7,000 men, though there existed a deficit in training and qualified leadership. This was partly resolved by the loaning of Belgian Army officers from the Belgian government and the institution of several training programs in the metropole for their use. By March 1961 the gendarmerie was composed of 600 European and 8,000 indigenous soldiers.

=== Escalation of UN–Katangese tension ===
The announcement of Lumumba's death created a sense of urgency among the international community and motivated members of the UN Security Council to strengthen ONUC's powers. On 21 February 1961 the UN Security Council passed a resolution permitting ONUC to use military force as a last resort to prevent civil war. As the Congo was already more-or-less in a state of civil war, the resolution gave ONUC significant latitude to act. It also called for the immediate departure of all foreign military personnel and mercenaries from the country, though the use of force was not authorised to carry out the measure. Therefore, force could only be used to remove foreign soldiers and mercenaries if it was justified under the reasoning that such action would be necessary to prevent civil war. ONUC was not also authorised to impose a political solution by force or directly intervene in internal Congolese affairs and, as such, was primarily concerned with reducing the influence of foreign interests in the Katangese conflict.

The Katangese government disregarded the resolution and carried forward with its plans to suppress rebellious Baluba tribesmen in the northern sections of the province. The resulting rise in tensions was followed by a Katangese attempt on 7 April to seize the town of Kabalo. UN troops resisted, sinking a gendarmerie barge and arresting over two dozen mercenaries. After interrogation, the mercenaries were deported from the Congo. The event marked the first use of the permissions of the February resolution. The UN then attempted to secure the cooperation of the Belgian and Katangese governments in carrying out the Security Council's decisions, but by May little progress had been made. Believing that Tshombe and his subordinates were only stalling through negotiations, UN officials decided to dispatch a new representative to Élisabethville, the Katangese capital, with demands for immediate compliance with the resolution. A member of the Irish Diplomatic Service, Conor Cruise O'Brien, was appointed to the role and arrived in the city on 14 June.

Meanwhile, UN officials engaged in negotiations with Belgian Foreign Minister Paul-Henri Spaak and secured an agreement over the withdrawal of certain Belgian political advisers in Katanga. Pressure from Belgium and the UN facilitated the repatriation of two officers in early June, though by the end of the month the Katangese government appeared unwilling to allow further departures. At the beginning of July the UN requested the withdrawal of more advisers and demanded that Georges Thyssens, one of Tshombe's aides, leave the Congo immediately. After a few days Thyssens still showed no intention of departing, so O'Brien ordered three Swedish soldiers to forcibly expel him. A scuffle occurred during the ensuing confrontation during which it was rumoured the Thyssens family dog was shot. The episode brought strong protest from the Katangese, who seized the Belgian consulate and expelled an official that had been encouraging his compatriots—as directed by the Belgian Foreign Ministry—to be more accepting of the Belgian and Congolese central governments' attitudes.

In a meeting on 12 July, Spaak suggested to Hammarskjöld that the UN should identify all the advisers it wanted to leave, so as to ease the anxieties of other Belgians' who feared their own sudden expulsion and therefore prevent another incident. After some negotiations Tshombe agreed to allow a Katangese delegation to confer with ONUC about the advisers to be removed. In the ensuing discussions both parties agreed upon a list of 11 Belgians that should be withdrawn from Katanga. The UN warned that if the advisers were replaced by other foreigners they too would be expelled. By August external involvement in Katanga had been reduced by the UN, but the "immediate" withdrawal of mercenaries and foreign advisers as called for in the February resolution had not been achieved. Further progress through negotiation seemed unlikely, as the Katangese were growing more hostile and Spaak was facing increasing opposition in Katanga and Belgium.

Meanwhile, a new Congolese coalition government had formed in Léopoldville under Prime Minister Cyrille Adoula. It faced great pressure to reintegrate Katanga into the Congo and risked collapse if this was not achieved, something ONUC was keen to avoid. With his diplomatic overtures to Tshombe failing, Adoula resolved that Katanga would not end its secession unless threatened with military force. With the army in a state of disarray, the Congolese government instead appealed to ONUC for its intentions. On 5 August ONUC created an independent Katanga Command under Indian Army Brigadier K.A.S. Raja with O'Brien as Chief of Mission, allowing local forces more operational initiative.

== Prelude ==
=== UN preparations ===
After long consideration of the situation, the UN Secretariat determined that if Tshombe failed to comply with its requests that foreign officers of the Katangese Gendarmerie should be forcibly arrested and deported. UN officials hoped that an initial show of force would convince the officers to cooperate and ultimately avoid violent confrontations. The Secretariat never issued an explanation of its decision to carry out this plan, though the mercenary actions in northern Katanga proved that foreign personnel were waging civil war and months of negotiations had done little to bring about their removal. Planning for Operation Rum Punch began on 19 August at ONUC Headquarters in Léopoldville, the Congolese capital. At Kamina Base in Katanga (which had been under UN control since 4 August) Irish troops established a detention centre for prisoners. At Hammarskjöld's suggestion, on 24 August President Kasa-Vubu promulgated Ordinance No. 70, declaring all non-Congolese military personnel in the country not under central government contract to be "illegal aliens" and requesting UN assistance in expelling them. As ONUC had been established with the goal of assisting the central government in the "maintenance of law and order", this provided the UN further justification to undertake the operation.

"UN Forces in the Élisabethville area will implement the Security Council Resolution of 21st Feb. 1961 by taking into custody and expelling white officers and mercenaries of the Gendarmerie."

— UN Secretariat order authorising Operation Rum Punch

Faced with no other alternatives, ONUC officials decided to proceed with the plan to arrest and repatriate the Katangese Gendarmerie's foreign cadre. On 27 August O'Brien met with Mahmoud Khiary, Vladimir Fabry, and Raja at Kamina Base to make final preparations for the operation. Raja and his staff had already drawn up plans for the arrest of the foreign personnel which had been reviewed by General Indar Jit Rikhye and diplomat Ralph Bunche and sanctioned by Hammarskjöld. At O'Brien's suggestion the plan was modified to include the occupation of the post office (which hosted the telephone exchange) and radio station and the establishment of a cordon around Katangese Minister of Interior Godefroid Munongo's residence. This was to prevent the Katangese from encouraging or coordinating resistance. The operation was originally scheduled to take place on 29 August, but Raja moved it up 24 hours earlier to maintain tactical surprise.

=== Opposing forces ===
On the eve of Operation Rum Punch the UN had 5,720 troops in Katanga; there were 1,600 Indians, 500 Irish, and 400 Swedes in Élisabethville, 1,200 Indians in Albertville, 1,000 Indians at Kamina Base, 500 Indians at Kabalo, 400 Ethiopians and Indians in Manono, and 120 Irish in Jadotville. Only Irish and Swedish units were detailed for arrest duties in Élisabethville, potentially to avoid aggravating racial tensions.

ONUC command estimated that the Katangese Gendarmerie numbered over 13,000 men with about 3,000 in Élisabethville, 2,000 in Jadotville and the nearby Shinkolobwe camp, 1,600 in Kolwezi; one battalion (about 800 men) each in Manono, Kongolo, Kipushi, Baudouinville, Mitwaba, Kaniama, and Kaminaville; and half a battalion in Kabongo and Kapanga. Four hundred-and-sixty of their officers were Europeans, who had recently developed a plan for defending Katangese borders from central government forces. These forces were bolstered by armed sections of the local population, especially around Kamina and in the Sandoa region. The Katangese Air Force was headquartered in Kolwezi, where gendarmes controlled the local airstrip and were in possession of one operational Fouga CM.170 Magister.

== Operation ==
Operation Rum Punch commenced at 04:00 on 28 August 1961. Two companies of the Indian Dogra Regiment seized the radio station and the post office, arresting two Belgian officers. At the former, a temporary manager broadcast an apology for the momentary suspension of telephone services and read the central government ordinance expelling foreign mercenaries and a speech by Adoula appealing for national unity. Several mercenaries avoided capture by seeking refuge with locals or their respective national consulates. Others remained out of reach deep within the Katangese bush. Near the shore of Lake Tanganyika in northeastern Katanga, Ghanaian troops surrounded mercenary Bob Denard's camp. His men wanted to fight, but they were ordered via radio to surrender. Eleven mercenaries were arrested around Albertville, nine were taken in Manono, seven in Niemba, and three in Nyunzu. In Kamina, the local Indian officer gave foreign personnel 12 hours to surrender themselves or face the use of force. The mercenaries turned in their weapons without incident and in return accepted drinks from the UN contingent.

At 05:00 in Élisabethville O'Brien dispatched a Swedish lieutenant to Tshombe's Presidential Palace and to Munongo's villa with two notes explaining the purpose of the operation. After delivering the second message, the lieutenant drove around an ONUC roadblock at a high speed. The Irish peacekeepers manning the post did not recognise him in the dark and opened fire, damaging the rear of his car. One bullet passed through the driver's seat and grazed his back.

At 06:00 O'Brien and Raja went into the Élisabethville city centre in search of Tshombe. They encountered him in a convoy of government officials on return from a tour. At a meeting in the Presidential Palace, Tshombe and his cabinet requested that the UN terminate the operation. O'Brien and Raja refused, and instead asked for the Katangese to co-operate to prevent any conflict. Tshombe said he would have to discuss the proposition with his ministers and promised they would have a decision by 11:00.

At 15:00 further arrests were suspended, with 79 mercenaries already detained. By the end of the day, 81 foreign personnel of the Katangese Gendarmerie had been arrested in Katanga and brought to Kamina base to await deportation. Most of the remaining Belgian mercenaries reported to their consulate. In addition to the arrests, two Sikorsky helicopters, three Aloutte helicopters, three Dakotas, four Doves, and two Herons of the Katangese Air Force were seized. Two Fouga CM.170 Magisters, two Doves, and one Tri-Pacer stationed outside of Élisabethville were not confiscated.

== Aftermath ==
=== Analyses ===
Operation Rum Punch heralded the beginning of the UN's direct clashing with the Katangese state. According to historian Thomas R. Mockaitis, "Despite its lack of complete success, Rumpunch could not be considered a complete failure." O'Brien called it a "partial success"; the operation reinvigorated the Afro-Asian bloc's confidence in ONUC, improved the central government's situation—including the subsequent formal recognition of the legitimacy of Adoula's government by the Soviet Union, and removed numerous mercenaries from Katanga. Hammarskjöld sent a congratulatory telegram to O'Brien from UN Headquarters in New York City, writing, "Congo Club (Note: "Congo Club" was the informal term for an ad hoc group of advisers at the UN Secretariat that discussed issues related to the Congo.) in congress assembled passed unanimous vote of congratulations gratification and sincere respect for an exceedingly sensitive operation carried through with skill and courage". He did, however, feel that the operation had been terminated too soon. Rikhye also expressed his disappointment, noting that "The UN had it within its grasp to close the ring and remove all unwanted individuals with perhaps a few remaining who could have hidden or vanished among the European civilians."

The day following Rum Punch Prime Minister of the Federation of Rhodesia and Nyasaland Sir Roy Welensky condemned the operation, declaring that it had "exceeded the UN's mandate." La Libre Belgique wrote that it had ruined "the beautiful friendship between black and white" in Katanga. The British Foreign Office told the British Mission at the United Nations to express concern that ONUC was "going beyond what some of the major sponsors of the United Nations (including those who bear most of the cost) have ever envisaged."

=== Effects on the Katangese Gendarmerie ===
The Belgian government agreed facilitate the repatriation of its nationals serving in the Katangese Gendarmerie, but in practice was only able to order the former Force Publique officers to return to Belgium under threat of losing their official ranks in the Belgian Army. The operation also did not extend to all military centers in Katanga. Thus, many foreign officers, particularly the highly committed "ultras" were able to avoid deportation. The gendarmerie also underwent a nominal Africanisation; Colonel Norbert Muké, a native Katangese, was made commander of the Katangese Gendarmerie, but in practice its leadership was still heavily influenced by European mercenaries. Lieutenant Colonel Roger Faulques, a Frenchman, was made chief of staff. In response to Rum Punch, he established a headquarters near Kolwezi to coordinate guerrilla resistance against ONUC. Though it had lost a large number of its aircraft, the Katangese Air Force still maintained air superiority over Katanga, as the UN had no combat aircraft of its own.

=== Subsequent events ===
O'Brien and ONUC Chief Sture Linner made plans to continue the roundup of foreign military officials in Katanga's employ. On 31 August O'Brien asked Tshombe to dismiss Munongo as he was suspected of encouraging Katangese troops to attack ONUC personnel. Munongo denied the accusation, and Tshombe refused to remove him. On 5 September Katangese Foreign Minister Évariste Kimba announced to the Katangese Assembly that the government would not yield to further UN demands. Four days later the Katangese set up roadblocks in Élisabethville to hinder movement of ONUC personnel.
