= Operation Grandslam =

1962–1963 UN offensive in the Congo

- Part of the Congo Crisis
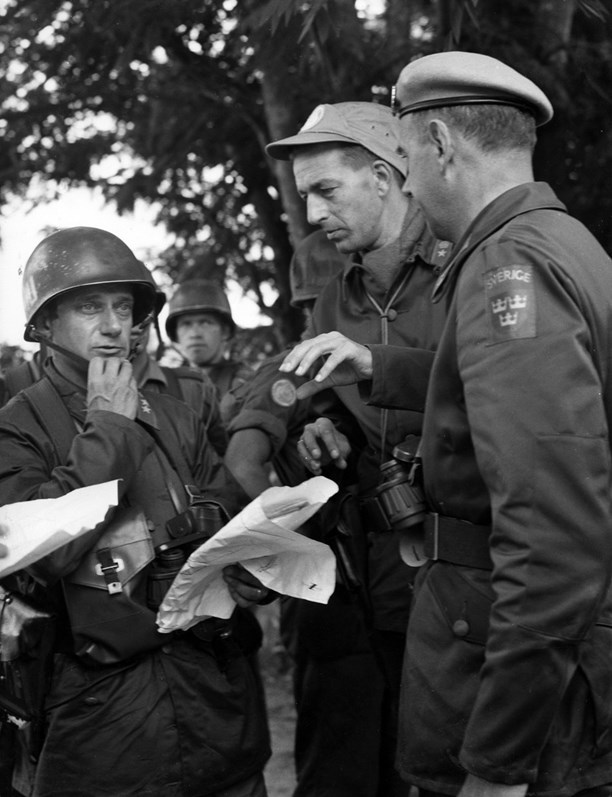
- Swedish UN peacekeepers led by Major Sture Fagerström plan their attack on the town of Kamina during the operation
Date	28 December 1962 – 15 January 1963
Location	State of Katanga
Result	ONUC victory: Katangese secession formally ended on 17 January; Beginning of Katanga insurgency
Territorial changes	Katanga Province reintegrated into Congo-Léopoldville

Belligerents
ONUC (Note: Numerous national forces participated in ONUC, the United Nations Operation in the Congo. For Operation Grandslam, this officially included troops from Ethiopia, Ghana, India, Ireland, Sweden and Tunisia. Logistical support was provided by the United States. Troops from Malaysia and Nigeria fought in Katanga simultaneously to the operation while an anti-aircraft unit from Norway was also present.): Ethiopia; Ghana; India; Ireland; Sweden; Tunisia; Supported by: Congo-Léopoldville	Katanga (surrendered) Supported by: Portuguese Angola; South Africa; Northern Rhodesia

Commanders and leaders
U Thant; Dewan Prem Chand; Reginald Noronha	Moïse Tshombe (surrendered); Norbert Muke (surrendered); Jeremiah Puren

Strength
~13,000 troops 10 fighter aircraft 2 reconnaissance aircraft	14,000–17,000 gendarmes 300–500 mercenaries 12 combat aircraft

Casualties and losses
10–11 killed 27–77 wounded 7 fighter aircraft damaged 1 reconnaissance aircraft damaged	50+ killed (Note: Total statistics on Katangese Gendarmerie and mercenary casualties are unknown.); 10–11 combat aircraft destroyed
- There were no reports of civilian deaths confirmed by the UN during the operation, but statistics are ultimately unknown. (Note: According to a 1966 report prepared for the United States Arms Control and Disarmament Agency and an American journalist, two Belgian women were shot at a UN checkpoint after the driver of their car suddenly accelerated the vehicle. Two hospital patients were wounded during the fighting.)

Operation Grandslam was an offensive undertaken by United Nations peacekeeping forces from 28 December 1962 to 15 January 1963 against the forces of the State of Katanga, a secessionist state rebelling against the Republic of the Congo (now the Democratic Republic of the Congo) in Central Africa. The conflict ended with the defeat of the State of Katanga and its subsequent dissolution.

The United Nations had tried several times to reconcile the government of the Congo with the State of Katanga, which had declared independence under Moïse Tshombe with Belgian support in 1960. Though initially limiting its actions, the United Nations Operation in the Congo became increasingly impatient towards Katanga and Tshombe, drawing up plans to resolve the situation through force. Tshombe continuously violated agreements he had made with the United Nations and the Congolese government by building up his forces and bringing foreign mercenaries into the conflict. The situation reached a breaking point in December 1962 when Katangese gendarmes attacked peacekeeping forces in Katanga. United Nations Secretary-General U Thant authorised a retaliatory offensive to eliminate secessionist opposition.

Reinforced by aircraft from Sweden, United Nations peacekeepers completed the first phase of the operation, securing the Katangese capital, Élisabethville and destroying much of the Katangese Air Force by the end of the year. In early January, the United Nations forces turned their attention towards remaining strongholds in southern Katanga. Indian peacekeepers exceeded their orders and crossed the Lufira River ahead of schedule, generating panic behind the Katangese lines and embarrassing the United Nations leadership. Tshombe, realising that his position was untenable, approached Thant for peace. On 17 January 1963, he signed an instrument of surrender and declared the Katangese secession to be over. The central government reorganised the provincial administration of Katanga to weaken its political structure. Tshombe initially participated but feared his arrest and fled to Europe.

Many Katangese gendarmes and their mercenary leaders took refuge in Angola to reorganise, acting under orders from Tshombe. In 1964, Tshombe was welcomed back to the Congo and made prime minister. He immediately called on his forces to suppress communist revolts in the east and centre of the country. This they accomplished but Tshombe was dismissed from his post in 1965, ultimately losing all contact with them following his imprisonment in Algeria in 1967. Relations between the new central government and the gendarmes soured and, after a mutiny was repressed, they returned to Angola. An insurgency for Katangese secession continues to the present day.

== Background ==
=== Katanga's secession ===
Following the Republic of the Congo's independence from Belgium in 1960, the country fell into disorder as the army mutinied. Shortly thereafter South Kasai and the State of Katanga declared independence from the Congolese government. The latter contained the vast majority of the Congo's valuable mineral resources and attracted significant mining activity under Belgian rule. Many Katangese thought that they were entitled to the revenue generated through the lucrative industry, and feared that under the new central government it would be distributed among the Congo's poorer provinces. Resulting nativist politics with support from the Belgian government and private interests such as the Union Minière du Haut Katanga (UMHK) precipitated the Katangese secession.

The deposition—and eventual murder—of Prime Minister Patrice Lumumba caused further issues in the country, leading to the declaration of a rival government in Stanleyville by the end of the year. To prevent a complete collapse of order within the country, the United Nations established a major peacekeeping mission, the United Nations Operation in the Congo (known under its French acronym as ONUC). In addition to a large body of troops (20,000 at its peak strength), a civilian mission was brought in to provide technical assistance to the Congolese government. Initially, ONUC limited its actions to ensuring the safety of Congolese citizens and foreign nationals and refrained from acting against the secessionist states, but the UN ran into trouble in Katanga. The state's leader and head of the locally entrenched Confédération des associations tribales du Katanga (CONAKAT), Moïse Tshombe, at first banned the UN from entering his territory and then greatly limited their peacekeeping efforts. Further issues derived from peacekeepers' attempts to deport foreign mercenaries, many of whom were employed by Katanga.

=== United Nations response ===
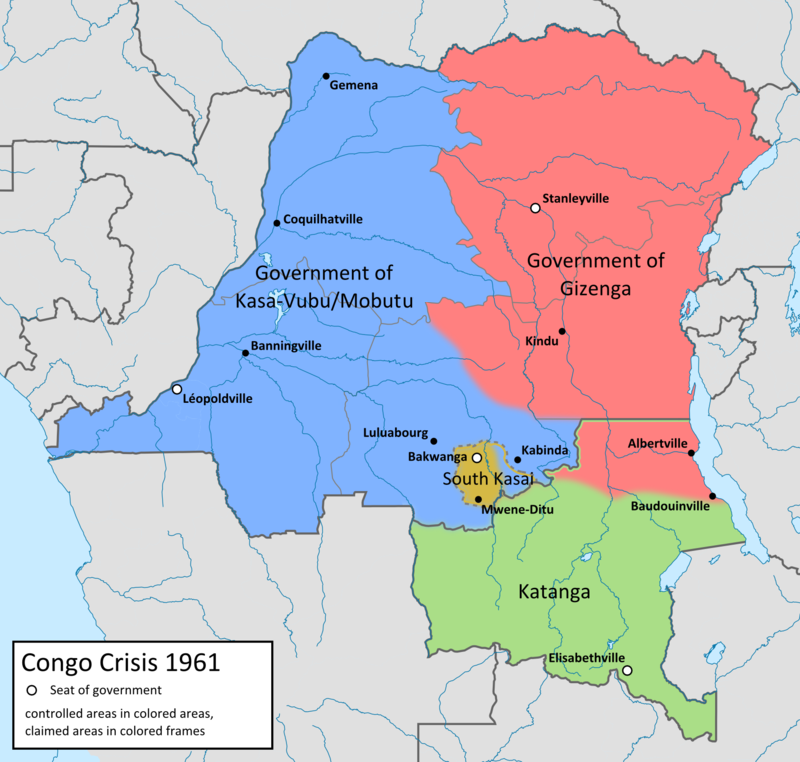
Map of the Congo with the State of Katanga in green

On 21 February 1961 the UN Security Council passed a resolution permitting ONUC to use military force to prevent civil war, make arrests, halt military operations, arrange ceasefires and deport foreign military personnel. Under the authorisation of this resolution, UN forces launched Operation Rumpunch and Operation Morthor (sometimes referred to as "Round One" of UN-Katangese conflict) with the aim of securing their own positions in Katanga and eliminating the presence of mercenaries. The former, though limited in scope, was largely successful, but the latter failed to achieve its objectives. As Morthor was underway, Special Representative Conor Cruise O'Brien announced, "The secession of Katanga has ended." This statement was quickly realised to be premature; Katanga fought the offensive to a stalemate.

United Nations Secretary-General Dag Hammarskjöld attempted to meet Tshombe for negotiations in Northern Rhodesia, but on the night of 17 September his plane crashed, killing all aboard. Hammarskjöld's untimely death, combined with an overall rise in tensions, helped rally international support for a more robust peacekeeping approach. His replacement, U Thant, was less averse to using military force in the Congo and believed that the UN should intervene in internal Congolese affairs. Thant promptly requested that the Security Council grant ONUC a stronger mandate. This came in the form of a resolution on 24 November, which maintained the goals of previous ONUC resolutions and cleared up any remaining ambiguities surrounding the role and nature of the UN's intervention. It reaffirmed ONUC's ability to detain and deport foreign military personnel and mercenaries with force, described Katanga's secessionist activities as illegal, and declared the UN's support for the central government of the Congo in its efforts to "maintain law and order and national integrity".

Tshombe immediately responded to the resolution by broadcasting an inflammatory speech against ONUC. This was followed by the assault of two UN officials and the murder of two Indian soldiers at the hands of the Katangese Gendarmerie. (Note: The Katangese Gendarmerie was Katanga's regular army, not a police force.) In turn ONUC's command structure in Katanga, mindful of the new mandate, issued instructions to UN troops to put "an end to Katangese resistance to UN policy by destruction of Gendarmerie and other anti-UN resistance."

=== Escalation ===
In December 1961, the UN initiated Operation Unokat (dubbed "Round Two") to ensure ONUC personnel's freedom of movement and reassert their authority in Katanga. Under military pressure, Tshombe was forced to enter serious negotiations with Congolese Prime Minister Cyrille Adoula. On 21 December 1961 Tshombe signed the Kitona Declaration, an agreement whereby he would recognise the authority of the central government and work to reintegrate Katanga into the Republic. However, Tshombe subsequently deferred to the Katangese Parliament and put off any action of reconciliation. In January 1962 the Stanleyville government was finally subdued and the UN was able to refocus its efforts on ending the Katangese secession. By then, contact between the central government and Katanga had broken down and ONUC intelligence reports indicated that the latter was rebuilding its forces.

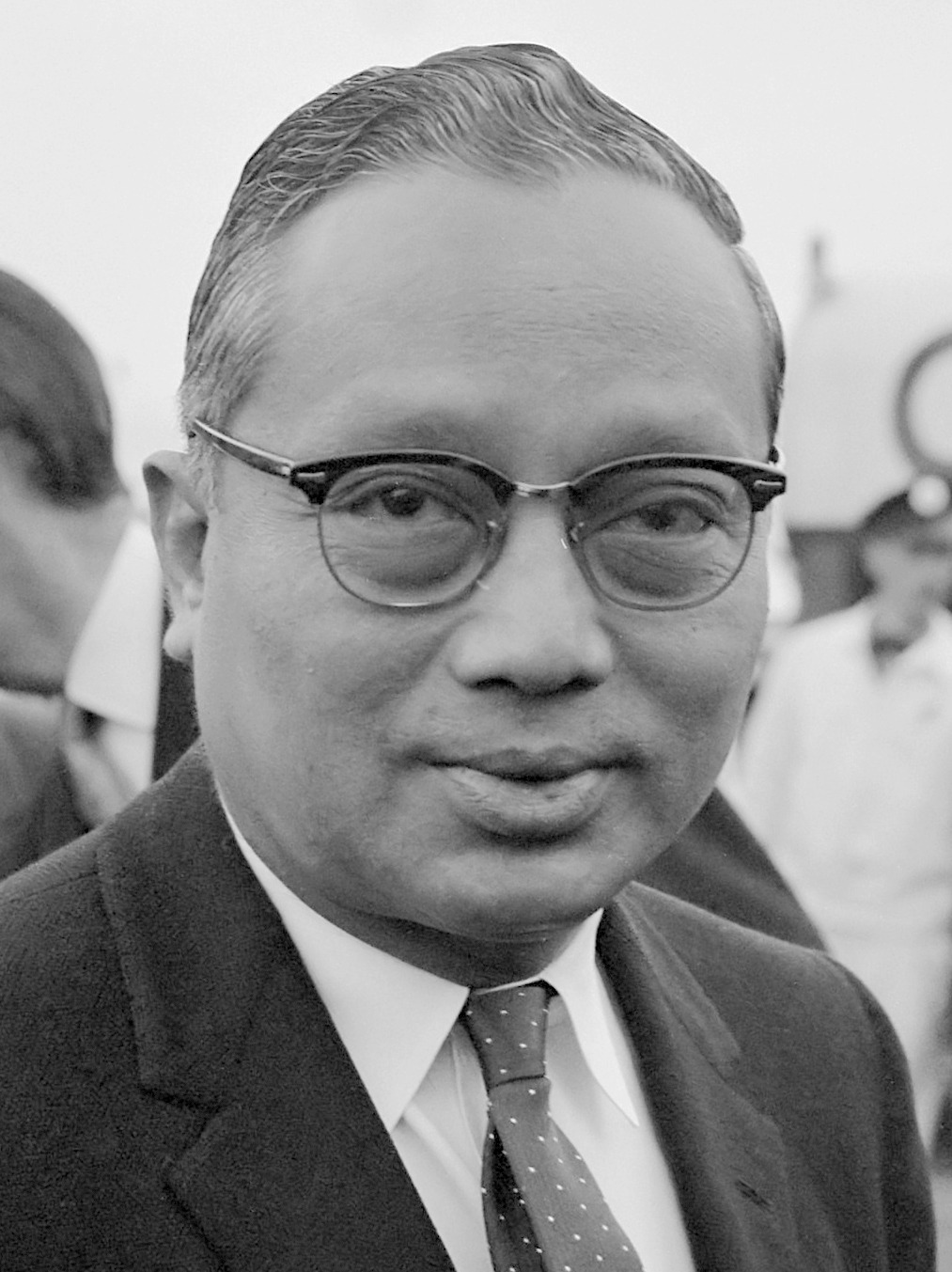
UN Secretary-General Thant

In August 1962 Thant proposed a "Plan for National Reconciliation" by which Katanga would rejoin a federalised Congo. Adoula and Tshombe both accepted the proposal. (Note: Though known as the "Thant Plan", the model had been drafted by U.S. diplomat George C. McGhee and was presented as the UN Secretary-General's own creation for political reasons. Thant and Adoula approved of the plan under U.S. pressure.) Thant was wary of Tshombe's delaying tactics and applied increasing political pressure on the Katangese government to abide by the plan's timetable. Belgian support for Katanga waned as the secession dragged on and the possibility of conflict increased, jeopardising investors' mining interests.

The outbreak of the Sino-Indian War in October raised the potential of all Indian troops being withdrawn from ONUC, putting pressure on UN officials to quickly resolve the secession. The United States government, which had underwritten most of the costs of ONUC, also began pushing for a conclusion, having determined that the operation was financially unsustainable. Still doubting the likelihood of a peaceful resolution, Thant sent Special Representative Ralph Bunche to Léopoldville, the capital of the Congo. There, Bunche worked with Officer-in-Charge of ONUC Robert K. A. Gardiner and UN Force Commander Sean MacEoin to create a plan to achieve freedom of movement for ONUC personnel and eliminate the foreign mercenaries.

By then it was obvious to ONUC that Tshombe did not intend on rejoining the Congo; there were 300 to 500 mercenaries in Katanga (as many as there had been before previous UN operations) and new airfields and defensive positions were being constructed. ONUC personnel and even diplomatic staff faced increasing harassment from Katangese gendarmes. Katangese jets were also attacking ONUC and central government forces, in effect waging civil war. Tshombe was fully aware of the military contingency operation and accused the UN of searching for a pretext to use force against Katanga.

On 27 November the United States and Belgium issued a joint statement, announcing that Thant's plan had failed and calling for increased economic pressure on Katanga. On 10 December Gardiner announced that the UN would take economic measures against Katanga. He wrote a letter to Tshombe, accusing Katanga of failing to institute the Plan for National Reconciliation's provisions or otherwise end its secession. He also demanded that Katangese forces cease military action in northern Katanga, end their supply blockade against UN troops at Sakania, and release detained Tunisian peacekeepers. The letter stated that the UN "would take no offensive military action", but would respond greatly to an attack and take measures deemed necessary to prevent further attacks. The following day Belgian Foreign Minister Paul-Henri Spaak declared that the Belgian government would support the UN or the Congolese government should either one end the Katangese secession through force. He then denounced Tshombe as a "rebel". The United States Department of Defense shortly thereafter dispatched a team to the Congo to evaluate the UN's material requirements for carrying out an offensive and offered military intelligence aid to ONUC. The Katangese responded by organising anti-American demonstrations in Élisabethville.

== Prelude ==
At 10:00 on 24 December 1962, Katangese forces in Élisabethville and along Avenue Tombeur attacked Ethiopian peacekeepers with small arms fire, wounding one. (Note: According to The New York Times, the shooting began when a group of gendarmes, accustomed to meeting Tunisian peacekeepers, approached an Ethiopian position. The Ethiopians—having just replaced the Tunisians and unaware of this norm—fired warning shots, which the Katangese interpreted as hostile and began firing.) The shooting lasted five hours. The UN maintained that the Ethiopians held their fire, but an Associated Press correspondent reported that they responded with a recoilless rifle. At 11:00 gendarmes shot down an unarmed ONUC helicopter. An Indian member of the crew was mortally wounded while the rest were captured and beaten. A group of ONUC officers was later able to recover the prisoners without incident. Occasional fire continued the next day, and Katangese Foreign Minister Évariste Kimba promised it would cease. The situation was calm in Élisabethville on 26 December, but on 27 December the gendarmes resumed their sporadic fire against UN positions and by the late evening peacekeepers were under attack from roadblocks around the golf course and along Jadotville Road. In reaction to the increasing Katangese hostility, the ONUC Air Division issued Fighter Operations Order 16, directing UN aircraft to retaliate against Katangese aircraft mounting any attack (including against non-UN targets) and to shoot down any others deemed to be carrying "visible offensive weapons, such as bombs or rockets". Tshombe sent a letter to UN representative Eliud Mathu, accusing the peacekeepers of having obstructed the passage of Katangese government ministers on 24 December and engaging in "a general plan" of military operations. Mathu responded by saying that the ministers' movements had been restricted only to ensure their presence so they could order the gendarmes to back down and mediate the release of the helicopter crew.

Mathu proceeded to invite Tshombe to his house so he could be brought to a scene of conflict and see what was occurring. Tshombe agreed, and peacekeepers escorted him to the front lines where he agreed that his own forces were attacking UN positions without provocation. After the tour, Tshombe returned to his residence. Though he initially proclaimed his intent to end the fighting, he went into an adjacent room and telephoned the Katangese forces in Kolwezi. Speaking in Kiswahili, he instructed the Katangese Air Force to raid UN positions. Radio intercepts also revealed to the UN that General Norbert Muke, the commander of the Katangese Gendarmerie, had ordered the air force to bomb the Élisabethville airport on the night of 29 December. With the failure to enact a ceasefire, Major General Dewan Prem Chand of India convinced Thant to authorise a strong, decisive offensive to pre-emptively eliminate Katangese forces. This brought relief to some of the UN peacekeepers, mindful that they now had justification to act forcefully against Katanga. Determined to avoid civilian casualties and widespread destruction, the secretary-general sent a wire to the UN Force Commander in the Congo to explain that napalm was to be prohibited from use in combat. In a final attempt to prevent further conflict, Mathu presented Tshombe a document at 11:30 on 28 December for his signature. It stipulated the removal of Katangese roadblocks and the cessation of attacks. Tshombe said he could not sign it without the consent of his ministers and left the meeting. The UN subsequently announced that it would take action to remove the roadblocks on its own. For unknown reasons, Tshombe quietly departed Élisabethville.

== Opposing forces ==
=== Katanga ===
In addition to the 300 to 500 mercenaries, Katanga had approximately 14,000 to 17,000 gendarmes in its service, of whom around 7,000 had not received military training. Through reconnaissance, the UN had learned that these forces were concentrated on defending the southern tier of the province (much of the north was already under central government control), with about 5,150 troops in and around the towns of Jadotville, Kolwezi and Bunkeya. Another 2,000 garrisoned Élisabethville. The UN also estimated that the Katangese Air Force possessed a number of Harvards, Magisters and de Havilland Vampires, amounting to a dozen combat aircraft, as well as some other transport aircraft and small planes. However, they believed that many Katangese aircraft were unserviceable. ONUC intelligence observed limited stockpiles of ammunition, petroleum, oil and lubricants at a few airfields.

=== ONUC ===
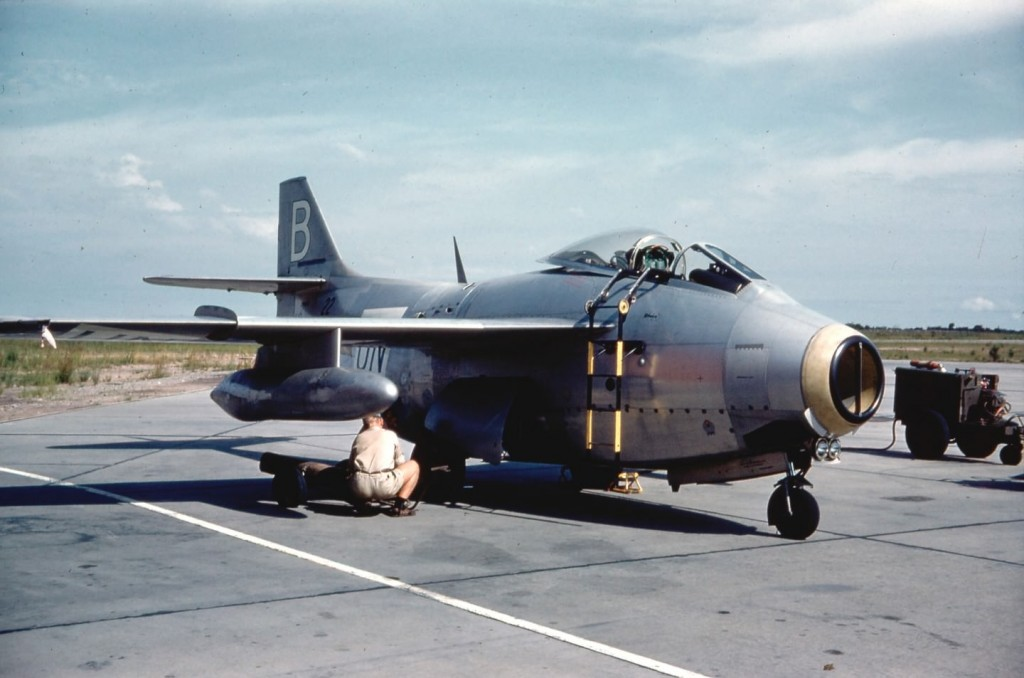
J 29 reconnaissance-variant at Kamina Air Base

ONUC forces in Katanga were under the command of Major General Chand and his operational deputy, Brigadier Reginald Noronha. ONUC force strength had been raised to 18,200, 70 per cent of whom were deployed in and around Katanga. Peacekeeping contingents from Ethiopia, Ghana, India, Ireland, Sweden and Tunisia were earmarked by the UN to carry out Operation Grandslam. In order to simultaneously deploy these troops for the operation, the UN required a large airlift capability. ONUC had amassed an air transport fleet of 65 planes, the largest being Douglas DC-4s, but it was still insufficient for Operation Grandslam. Thant's military attaché, Indar Jit Rikhye, had requested assistance from the United States Department of Defense. Several days later, the United States committed its air force to provide logistical support. In November United States President John F. Kennedy offered to supply the UN with American fighter jets to exert an "overwhelming show of strength from the air". Thant, though desiring forceful UN ground and air action, was eager to keep ONUC impartial and wanted to refrain from calling on too much support from any major world powers. On 16 December he declared that he would consider the American offer if the situation remained deadlocked by the spring of 1963.

The need for combat aircraft was long-standing a problem for ONUC, which had been delaying the commencement of the operation until sufficient air strength had been amassed to conduct a single attack that could destroy the Katangese Air Force. It was feared that a limited attack would fail to eliminate all Katangese aircraft and stretch their own forces thin, thereby allowing Katanga to disperse its air forces among hidden airfields and launch retaliatory attacks on Kamina Air Base. India had withdrawn its Canberra bombers in October to guard against China, and Ethiopia repatriated its force of Sabres after one was lost in an accident. However, new air surveillance radar equipment was deployed in Kamina and Élisabethville. The ONUC Air Division was bolstered in November by the delivery of two Saab 29 Tunnan (J 29) reconnaissance-variant jets from Sweden, greatly enhancing the force's intelligence capabilities. This was followed shortly thereafter by the arrival of several Swedish J 29 combat aircraft and a 380-strong anti-aircraft unit from Norway. In all, the UN would field 10 combat J 29s in the operation.

== Operation ==
Map of the Operation Grandslam

=== Plan ===
Operation Grandslam was planned to include three phases, but was successfully completed in two. The first phase was designed to "restore the security of ONUC troops in the Élisabethville area and their freedom of movement by clearing the gendarmerie road-blocks from which fire had been directed at United Nations troops." The second phase would involve advances into Jadotville and Kolwezi to arrest foreign mercenaries. The third phase was designed to deal with the mercenaries in Kamina.

=== First phase ===
Operation Grandslam commenced in the mid-afternoon on 28 December 1962 after Thant's ultimatum that the gendarmerie back down by 15:00 went unanswered, kicking off "Round Three" of the fighting in Katanga. The initial attacks triggered the flight of 50,000 refugees, many towards the Rhodesian border, though most would quickly return. In the first day, UN forces killed 50 Katangese gendarmes before securing downtown Élisabethville, (Note: This statistic is derived from the discovery of 50 bodies of Africans in the area after the fighting was over.) the local Gendarmerie headquarters, the radio station, and Tshombe's presidential palace.

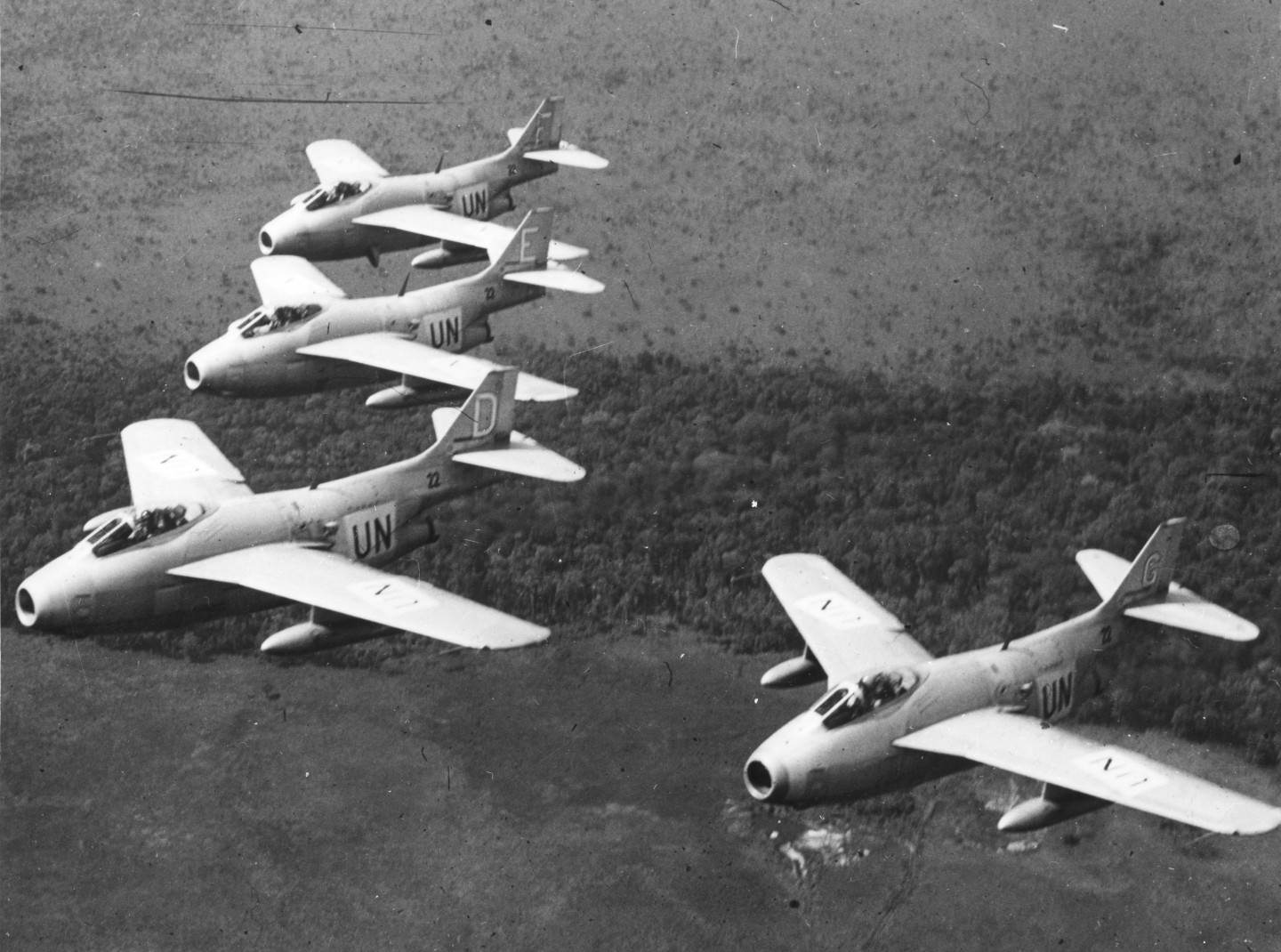
UN J 29 fighter jets in the Congo

Early on 29 December, the ONUC Air Division launched a surprise assault on the Kolwezi airfield. The J 29 fighter jets strafed with their 20mm cannons, as their unguided 145mm psrak m49A rockets were inoperable in the overcast skies. Five fuel dumps and the local administrative building were destroyed. To prevent civilian casualties, ONUC did not target the Kolwezi civilian airport. Katangese Air Force Commander Jeremiah Puren had, however, managed to evacuate six Harvard trainers before the attack occurred. Mercenary Jan Zumbach remained with the other portion of the air force in Portuguese Angola and did not intervene, infuriating Puren, who was ordered by General Muke to fall back to Jadotville. For the rest of the campaign most of the Katangese Air Force remained grounded, as Puren feared his Harvards would perform poorly against the UN's faster J 29 jets. Anti-aircraft fire damaged three UN planes at Kolwezi, but their attacks nonetheless continued throughout the day and were extended to other Katangese airfields, such as those at Kamatanda and Ngule. Three further UN reconnaissance missions resulted in the destruction of six Katangese aircraft on the ground and one further kill, possibly in the air. According to the UN, the air raids against the Kantangese Air Force were completed "without loss of life" on either side. Destroying so much of the Katangese Air Force at the onset of the operation was key for the UN to succeed; if Katanga were able to launch coordinated air attacks against UN supply airlifts, Grandslam would likely fail.

At midday Ethiopian units advanced down the Kipushi road to sever the Katangese lines to Rhodesia. Gendarmes were well positioned in wooded heights overlooking the route, but following heavy mortar bombardment they surrendered with little opposition. Irish troops, detailed for the purpose because they spoke English and could communicate with Rhodesian border guards, then passed through at night and seized the town of Kipushi without facing any resistance. Gardiner, holding a press conference on the matter in Léopoldville, jubilantly declared, "[W]e are not going to make the mistake of stopping short this time. This is going to be as decisive as we can make it." Tshombe ordered his troops to offer determined resistance to ONUC and threatened to have bridges and dams blown up if the operation was not halted within 24 hours. By 30 December, all the objectives for the first phase of Operation Grandslam had been accomplished. Major General Chand received a congratulatory telegram from Thant for the progress of UN forces. ONUC jet strafing and rocket attacks ended the following day, having successfully eliminated most of the Katangese Air Force.

=== Second phase ===
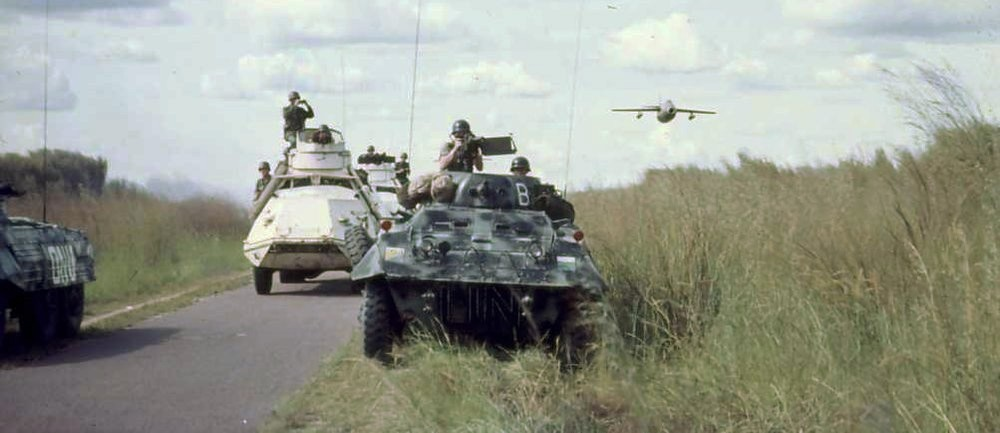
Swedish troops advancing on the town of Kamina

"Some may loosely say that there was a 'third round' in Katanga. That was not the case. There would have been no fighting at all if the Katangese Gendarmerie had not made it unavoidable by indulging in senseless firing for several days. In view of the results of the ONUC operation, there may be some who would be inclined to refer to a United Nations 'military victory.' I would not like this to be said. The United Nations is not waging war against anyone in that province."

— Statement by Secretary-General Thant before the UN Security Council on 31 December concerning ONUC's actions in Katanga

Pleased with the success of operations in Élisabethville, Chand decided to immediately carry forward with the UN's plans. In the afternoon of 30 December the commander of the Swedish battalion at Kamina Air Base, Överstelöjtnant Bengt Fredman, received orders to advance upon the gendarmerie encampments in Kamina early the following morning. The gendarmes had expected an attack on 30 December, but when one failed to occur they began to drink beer and fire flares at random, possibly to boost morale. Rogue bands of gendarmes subsequently conducted random raids around the city and looted the local bank.

Swedish and Ghanaian troops were ordered out of Kamina Air Base the following morning at 05:20. By 06:00 they were advancing down the main road towards the town of Kamina (dubbed Kamina-ville), while a detached Swedish company took back roads to the city through Kiavie. At 06:20 the company spearheading the advance came under heavy machine gun and mortar fire from the Katangese two or three kilometres northeast of Kamina and was ordered by Major Sture Fagerström to retreat 600 meters. The Swedes took cover and regrouped while Fredman organised an armoured car unit. He arrived at the front lines at 07:05 and the peacekeepers began their attack. Supported with mortars, a combat patrol advanced down the road and by 07:55 it had broken through the gendarmerie's defences. Swedish medics attended to the wounded Katangese that were left behind while the rest of the forces began entering the city.

The Katangese Gendamerie conducted a disorganised withdrawal to two camps southeast of Kamina. Shortly after 09:00 the Swedish battalion reached the city centre. Patrols slowly mopped up resistance and took several prisoners. J 29 jets flew low to the ground to intimidate the remaining gendarmes and were hit by small arms fire in return. At 09:55 the Swedish troops attacked the nearest gendarmerie camp, encountering only sporadic resistance. At 13:00 they secured the second camp unopposed, as the remaining Katangese had fled. The Swedes commandeered it and began working with municipal authorities to stabilise the local situation. Sustaining no casualties, the Swedish battalion seized about 40 vehicles, two armoured cars, a Bofors 40 mm gun, a recoilless rifle, several heavy machine guns, tons of ammunition, and a large amount of supplies.

The same day the 4th Battalion, Madras Regiment and members of the Rajputana Rifles (both part of the 99th Indian Infantry Brigade) moved out of Élisabethville for the Lufira River. Late that night a company of the Rajputana Rifles encountered entrenched gendarmes and mercenaries along Jadotville Road and a gunfight ensued. By the time firing ceased at 03:00 on 1 January 1963, four peacekeepers had been killed and 19 wounded. Two captured mercenaries revealed that confusion and desertion were occurring among the Katangese forces. Altogether the Indian forces faced unexpectedly light resistance and reached the east bank of the Lufira on 3 January.

The main bridge over the Lufira to Jadotville had been destroyed after the local mercenary commander blew up a truck parked halfway across it. UN forces bombarded the far side of the river with sporadic mortar fire. Though the shelling was mostly ineffectual, the mercenaries were unnerved by low-flying jets and withdrew to Jadotville after putting up minimal resistance. Meanwhile, UN troops stopped at the river bank to await the arrival of American bridging equipment, until they discovered a sabotaged rail bridge 7 miles (11 km) upstream that was still passable on foot. Brigadier Noronha, acting as the local commander, ordered the bridge to be secured. The Rajputana infantry crossed the bridge and swiftly neutralised Katangese opposition on the far side of the river. Meanwhile, the Madras battalion located a raft and, with the assistance of a Sikorsky helicopter, brought over most of their vehicles and heavy equipment. Not wanting to remain at an exposed bridgehead, Noronha had his troops occupy Jadotville. General Muke had attempted to organise a defence of the town, but Katangese forces were in disarray, being completely caught off-guard by the UN troops' advance. The Indian soldiers faced no resistance and were warmly welcomed by the local inhabitants and UMHK mining staff. Only when Noronha was in the town did he contact the UN headquarters in Léopoldville. UN forces briefly stayed in Jadotville to regroup before advancing on Kolwezi, Sakania and Dilolo.

Between 31 December 1962 and 4 January 1963, UN jets were only used for reconnaissance and providing cover to ground forces. By 4 January, the ONUC Air Division had conducted 76 air sorties, while patrolling by the J 29 jets had cut off Katanga from support in Angola and Southern Africa. Meanwhile, international opinion rallied in favour of ONUC. Belgium and France strongly urged Tshombe to accept Thant's Plan for National Reconciliation and resolve the conflict. Two days the later United States Air Force flew amphibious troop-carriers and armoured vehicles into Élisabethville. The 99th Indian Brigade had been waiting for their arrival, as the equipment was necessary in order to cross the dozen rivers and streams between Jadotville and Kolwezi. The troops began their advance three days later, but faced armed opposition and struggled to navigate the troop carriers through strong currents.

On 8 January, Tshombe reappeared in Élisabethville. The same day Prime Minister Adoula received a letter from the chiefs of the most prominent Kantangese tribes pledging allegiance to the Congolese government and calling for Tshombe's arrest. Thant, at the urging of the United States, considered making contact with Tshombe to negotiate. Bunche advised against this, saying to the secretary-general, "[Tshombe] is maneuvering in every possible way to get some recognition. His position, after all, is only that of a provincial president, and now, for the first time, he is reduced to size. He should be kept there." He shortly thereafter clarified his opinion, stating, "If we could convince [Tshombe] that there is no more room for maneuvering and bargaining, and no one to bargain with, he would surrender and the gendarmerie would collapse."

The following day Tshombe was briefly detained by UN soldiers, but he was released so he could meet with his minister of interior, Godefroid Munongo, and several of his other cabinet officials in Mokambo. It was alleged that along the way Tshombe urged his supporters to resist UN forces, but, regardless, Mokambo and Bakania were soon occupied. He expressed his willingness to negotiate with the central government, but warned that any advance on Kolwezi would result in the enactment of a scorched earth policy. In accordance with the threat, the Delcommune and Le Marinel dams were prepared for demolition. (Note: It is unknown if the dams were mined to such an extent that they could be completely destroyed. If such an effective demolition were to occur, there would have been a massive financial cost and the potential for thousands of deaths via flooding.) On 10 January, UN troops seized an abandoned gendarmerie base and secured Shinkolobwe. Tshombe fled to Northern Rhodesia on a Rhodesian Air Force plane. Adoula and many ONUC officials were determined to keep him out of the country, but he managed to reach Kolwezi, the only significant location that remained under Katangese control. Outside of the city several French mercenaries were skirmishing with UN troops when one patrol accidentally drove their jeep into a ditch. Nearby Indian Gurkhas believed them to be Swedish peacekeepers and helped them retrieve their vehicle. One of the mercenaries then spoke in French and the Indians realised their mistake. A firefight ensued in which all but one of the mercenaries, desperate to avoid capture, escaped. On 12 January Fredman's battalion surprised two gendarmerie battalions in Kabundji. The Swedes seized their weapons and directed them to return to their civilian livelihoods.

Meanwhile, mercenaries in the Kolwezi area had taken Tshombe's threats about a scorched earth policy seriously and had planted explosives on all nearby bridges, the Nzilo Dam (which provided most of Katanga's electricity) and most of the UMHK mining facilities. When Tshombe arrived on 12 January, he was informed by UMHK officials that they had negotiated a tax deal with the central government and were withdrawing their support for secession. They asked him to not spread the news, fearing the mercenaries would feel betrayed and destroy their facilities as revenge. Realising in a final meeting in Kolwezi that the situation was grim, Colonel Bob Denard suggested that, before fleeing, the mercenaries should destroy the Nzilo Dam to make a political statement. Tshombe, knowing that the UMHK would disapprove, told him that such an action would be "criminally irresponsible." Company representatives met with Brigadier General Noronha to discuss the best way for UN troops to enter Kolwezi without causing collateral damage. General Muke vainly attempted to organise the 140 mercenaries and 2,000 gendarmes under his command to prepare a final defence of the city. His efforts, undermined by the force's low morale and indiscipline, were further hampered by an influx of refugees. Discipline in the garrison increasingly faltered; in once instance, two mercenaries attempted to steal Puren's jeep. Tshombe ordered the Katangese garrison of Baudouinville to surrender to besieging UN and Armée Nationale Congolaise (ANC) forces. Instead, they and most of the population deserted the city while a handful of gendarmes near Kongolo laid down their arms to Nigerian and Malaysian soldiers. On 14 January, Indian troops found the last intact bridge into Kolwezi. After a brief fight with gendarmes and mercenaries they secured it and crossed over, stopping at the city outskirts to await further instruction.

On 15 January, Tshombe sent a formal message to Thant, "I am ready to proclaim immediately before the world that the Katanga's secession is ended." Munongo fled Kolwezi and angrily declared that he would continue the campaign from Rhodesia, though he soon returned. Tshombe offered to return to Élisabethville to oversee the implementation of Thant's proposal for reunification if Prime Minister Adoula granted amnesty to himself and his government. At a press conference, Adoula accepted Tshombe's proposition and announced that what remained of the Katangese Gendarmerie would be integrated into the ANC.

== Aftermath and analyses ==
=== Katangese surrender ===
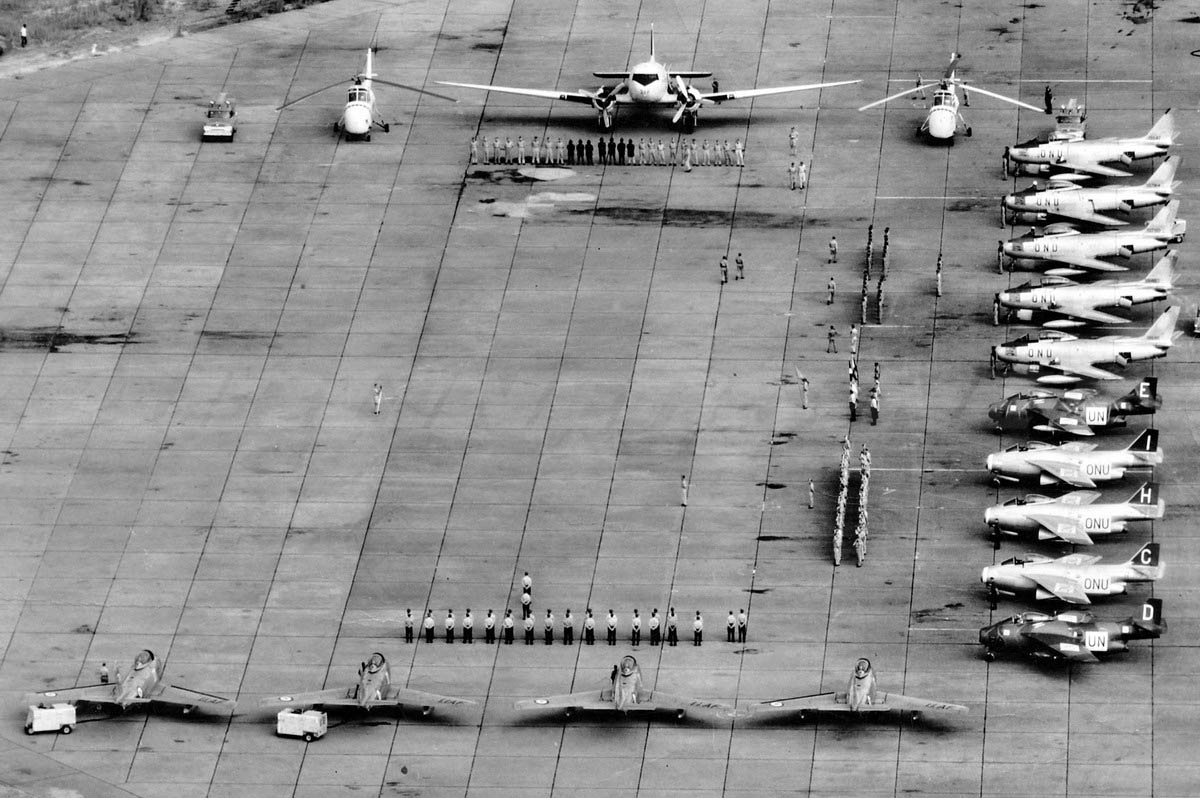
United Nations air forces in the Congo immediately following the conclusion of Operation Grandslam

On 17 January, forward elements of the 99th Brigade reached the Tshilongo River where they were ordered to halt. Late that afternoon, Tshombe and Munongo met with UN officials in Élisabethville to finalise negotiations. They concluded with Tshombe signing a formal instrument of surrender with Major General Chand and acting UN Civilian Chief George Sherry, officially ending the Katangese secession. Four days later he peacefully received UN troops in Kolwezi led by Brigadier Noronha. Thant sent a congratulatory message to the peacekeeping forces, declaring that the conflict had been "forced upon [them]", adding that "it was only after all other efforts failed that the order was given to undertake defensive action of removing the hostile gendarmerie roadblocks which has now been completed so successfully and fortunately with a minimum of casualties." All the various political concerns about what ramifications a UN attempt to crush the secession might cause, such as a drawn-out guerrilla war or power vacuum, were virtually resolved with the successful conclusion of Operation Grandslam. Most of the international community was satisfied with the result, including the United States, Belgium, the United Kingdom and the Soviet Union.

=== Military casualties and damage ===
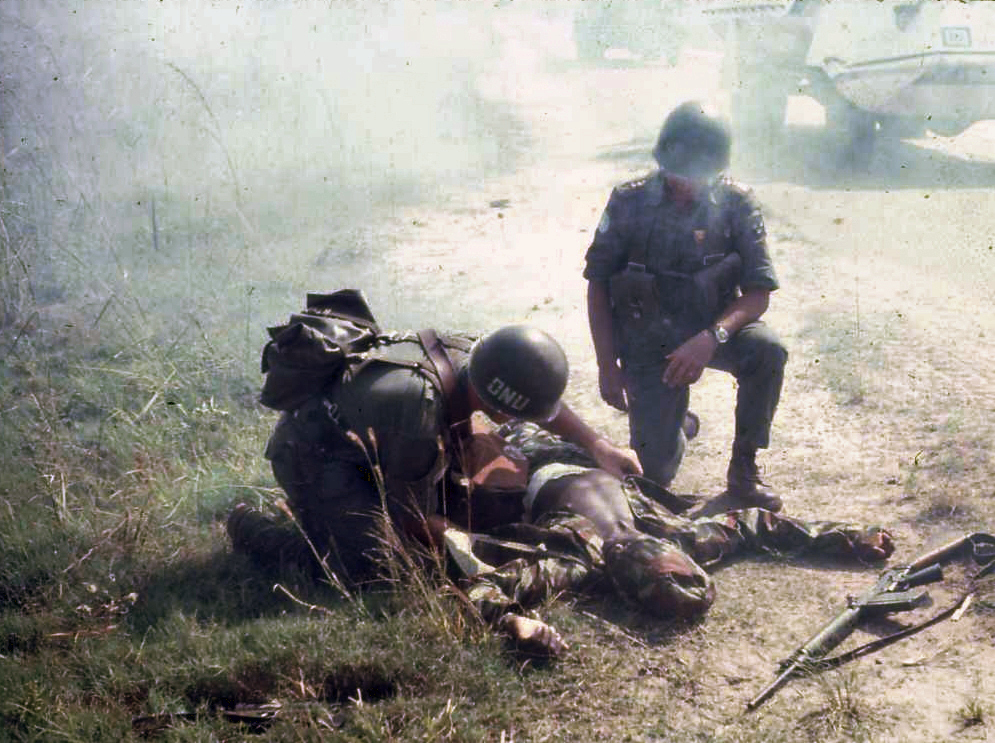
A wounded Katangese gendarme is treated by Swedish medics near Kamina

A total of either 10 or 11 UN peacekeepers were killed during the operation and between 27 and 77 were wounded. This relatively low casualty rate greatly relieved Thant and his advisers. Total statistics on Katangese Gendarmerie and mercenary casualties are unknown. A total of seven UN fighter aircraft and a single reconnaissance aircraft were damaged by fire from the ground. In return, the Katangese Air Force had lost almost a dozen of its Harvards, Magisters and de Havilland Vampires, most while on the ground. All Katangese combat aircraft, except for one or two Harvards, were recorded as destroyed by UN forces at the conclusion of Grandslam. General Christian Roy Kaldager, commander of the ONUC Air Force, later said of the Grandslam air campaign, "We are very proud of it—it is the best memory I take away from the Congo."

A subsequent investigation by an ONUC intelligence team found that 15 aircraft had been hidden at Angolan airfields for use, in the words of captured Belgian mercenaries, "in the next fight for Katanga's secession". The operation also cut short a delivery of Cavalier Mustangs which Tshombe had purchased and had been expected to arrive sometime in January. The UN was also able to confirm that Katanga had been able to acquire their aircraft with the knowledge and assistance of the governments of Portuguese Angola, South Africa and Northern Rhodesia.

=== Civilian casualties and alleged ONUC atrocities ===
The UN was unable to confirm reports of civilian casualties from the operation, allowing themselves to avoid much embarrassment in the press. However, statistics are ultimately unknown. According to a 1966 report prepared for the United States Arms Control and Disarmament Agency, two Belgian women were killed at a UN checkpoint at the outskirts of Jadotville by Indian peacekeepers after the male driver of the car they were in suddenly accelerated instead of stopping. The "unauthorised" shooting ostensibly "greatly embarrassed" UN officials. An American journalist in Katanga at the time also supported the assertion.

After the operation, a local priest sent a letter to the UN in protest of "the flagrant breach by UN troops of international conventions sacred to all civilised nations." He claimed that on 29 December Irish troops had fired upon patients in a ward of the Élisabethville Union Minière hospital at close range and that Ethiopian troops had killed 70 persons whose bodies were delivered to Prince Leopold Hospital before the end of 1962. The allegations were supported by Charles J. Bauer of the United States National Catholic Welfare Council and Archbishop Joseph Cornelius of Brussels.

Robert Gardiner refuted both accusations in an open letter to the vicar general of the Roman Catholic archbishopric in Élisabethville. Writing on the first charge, he said that Irish troops were not even in the area at the time. Instead, he detailed that Ethiopian soldiers had stormed the hospital compound after being subjected to heavy firing from Katangese gendarmes who had dug in there. Gardiner reported that the nun on duty had said some of the patients were wearing khaki clothing similar to the gendarmes' uniforms. He conceded that one patient was shot in the leg while another received a grazing wound. Gardiner also said no protests of the presence of gendarmes was ever forwarded to the International Red Cross and that the mother superior of the hospital testified that medical authorities had been advised by Union Minière officials to refrain from taking any action against the gendarmes and to avoid involving themselves in the matter altogether. As for the 70 corpses brought to Prince Leopold Hospital, Gardiner stated that "[n]o evidence has been produced to substantiate this allegation."

=== ONUC communications breakdown ===
The unexpected advance of the Indian forces under Brigadier Noronha into Jadotville on 3 January had created considerable international controversy and embarrassed Secretary-General Thant. Noronha had exceeded his initial orders by seizing a bridge and crossing over the Lufira River. Thant had guaranteed the British and the Belgians that such an advance would not occur, as both feared Tshombe would have UMHK property destroyed in retaliation. (Note: On 28 December the British Foreign Office had released a statement calling for the UN to cease all military action in light of "the futility of trying to impose a political settlement on the Congo by force".) Ralph Bunche had also given United States Secretary of State Dean Rusk and United States Ambassador to the United Nations Adlai Stevenson II the impression that UN troops were not to undertake further action in Katanga without specific authorisation from Thant. ONUC commanders were apparently never informed of such assurances. The Americans consequentially believed that the Secretary-General had lost control over his forces. Bunche had sent a message to Gardiner, directing him to delay the UN advance until Tshombe's intentions could be clarified, but orders failed to reach Chand or Noronha through ONUC's out-dated communications system (the message was sent via commercial overland cable from Léopoldville). Gardiner trepidly responded by reporting the advance. Bunche then demanded an explanation as to why UN troops had supposedly disregarded Thant's orders. A UN spokesperson acknowledged that from a military perspective the operation had been "brilliantly executed" but stated that the UN regretted the "serious breakdown in effective communication and coordination between United Nations Headquarters and the Léopoldville office."

The same day of the capture of Jadotville, Thant dispatched Bunche to the Congo to investigate the incident. Thant announced that Bunche's visit was for "a number of matters, political, military and administrative affecting the operation and its present and future activities," though his statement did little to disguise the reason for the trip from the international community. Upon his arrival in the country, Bunche read a hand-written statement to the press in which he assured them that the seizure of Jadotville was "part of the plan".

Major General Chand was particularly anxious about Bunche's visit. Keenly aware of this, Bunche did his best to alleviate the general's worries, asking to stay at his residence in Élisabethville instead of a hotel. Chand was alarmed when Bunche presented him with a letter from Thant, but Bunche reached into his pocket and pulled out a suggested response. The general was surprised by the accuracy of the draft in its considerations of the military situation of UN troops during the advance, though the following day he gave Bunche a full explanation of what had occurred. In his official report on the events in Katanga, Bunche concluded, "I have found beyond doubt that it is our machinery that is at fault, far more than the individuals." He returned to UN Headquarters on 10 January with an official apology from ONUC commanders. Thant later commented on the matter, writing, "I felt that it was I, not they, who should have apologised for my miscalculation and apprehensions based on scare reports from London and Brussels." According to UN official Eric S. Packham, it was unofficially suggested that the Indian government, in direct communication with Chand and impatient with the UN's progress in Katanga, unilaterally ordered Noronha's troops to seize Jadotville. Others rumoured that Gardiner had quietly approved of the action, or that Chand had deliberately delayed the halt order by directing all radio equipment to be deactivated.

=== Justification for the use of force ===
"Every morning I prayed for the sparing of lives. In the course of my meditation, I practiced metta and karuna to all in the Congo, without distinction as to race, religion, or colour. I realised, however, that the moral principals of my religion had to be adjusted to the practical responsibilities of my office."

— Secretary-General Thant's comments on his personal attitude towards ONUC action in the Congo

At the time, the use of such robust force against Katanga, including aircraft, artillery and armoured vehicles, aroused much controversy. Though personally dismayed by the violence as a Buddhist, Thant thought the operation was justified. His reasoning for such strong action fell in line with just war theory. Proponents of Katanga argued that the secessionist movement was a legitimate exercise of self-determination. Thant refuted the idea in his memoirs, listing three primary objections: first, the Congo had been admitted into the UN in 1960 as a "unified state" with the written agreement of Tshombe. Second, "no sovereign state in the world ever recognised the independence of Katanga". Third, Tshombe's government was "never able to exercise effective control" over the entirety of the province. Military researcher Walter Dorn speculated that Thant may have been personally sensitive to the issue of secession, having suffered from the bloody Karen conflict in his native Burma and witnessed the consequences of the Partition of India. Holding office during a time of widespread decolonisation in Africa and Asia, Thant was mindful of the precedent he was setting; recognising or encouraging secession in one country could allow it to spread to others with fractious consequences. As late as February 1970, he denounced secession, declaring that the UN "has never accepted and does not accept, and I do not believe it will ever accept, the principle of secession of a part of its Member State."

Thant also argued that ONUC had the enumerated authority to use force, as specified in the UN Charter and permitted by the UN Security Council in its resolutions. He maintained that Grandslam was a matter of last resort, as Tshombe had frequently gone back on his promises and decisive action was only taken after sustained Katangese aggression against UN peacekeepers. Thant claimed that ONUC had used force "in self-defence under attack", though this was not strictly the case, as he had, in accordance with the Security Council resolutions, authorised UN troops to undertake offensive action. The forceful operation could also be considered proportional; Katanga possessed an organised gendarmerie with fighter jets, extensive weapon stockpiles and a selection of mercenaries that disregarded the laws of war (i.e. by transporting weapons in vehicles marked with a red cross).

=== Fate of ONUC ===
With the end of the Katangese secession, much of the international community felt that ONUC had fulfilled its mandate and interest in maintaining the mission rapidly declined. In February following the reassertion of the central government's authority in Katanga, the UN began phasing out its peacekeeping force, with the goal of completing a total withdrawal by the end of the year. India was among the first countries to recall its troops. At the Congolese government's request, the UN authorised a six-month extension to ONUC's deployment, albeit with a reduced number of personnel. The last troops left the Congo on 30 June 1964. The civilian aid mission remained longer to provide technical assistance to the government.

=== Fate of Katanga ===
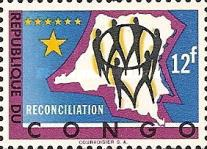
A 1963 postage stamp commemorating the "reconciliation" of the political factions in the Congo after the end of the Katangese secession

Tshombe and all of his ministers remained in Katanga following the conclusion of hostilities. He promised on CONAKAT's behalf to support the reunification of the Congo. Control of the provincial police was formally passed to Joseph Iléo on 5 February. As per the central government's decision, Katanga was divided into two provinces: North Katanga and South Katanga. Tshombe protested the "Balkanization" of the province, but cooperated and established his own provincial government in South Katanga by April. Godefroid Munongo also remained in the Katangese government, though he was removed from the interior ministry and made provincial minister of health. Prime Minister Adoula reshuffled his cabinet to include four CONAKAT members, including their floor leaders from both houses of Parliament. The central government also assumed control of Katanga's shares in UMHK, as well its holdings in 18 other companies, facilitating a financial rapprochement with Belgium.

Tshombe's rivalry with Association Générale des Baluba du Katanga (BALUBAKAT) leader Jason Sendwe, a northern Katangese politician, led to ethnic violence in Jadotville in which an estimated 74 people were killed. The following month ANC soldiers raided Tshombe's residence on accusations that he was maintaining a private militia. Later, the central government seized documents revealing his continued contact with foreign mercenaries. Fearing arrest and claiming political persecution, Tshombe fled to Paris, France, in June, eventually settling in Madrid, Spain. From there he developed plans with his gendarmerie commanders for a return to power, further complicating the central government's efforts to absorb the force.

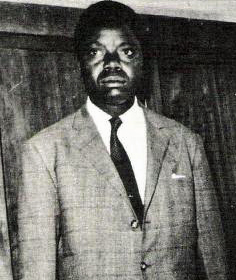
Moïse Tshombe

Halfway through the year South Katanga was further divided into the provinces of Katanga Oriental and Lualaba (also known as the new South Katanga). Though they were opposed to such divisions, many Katangese leaders from the secession joined the new provincial governments. A new constitutional commission was established, and in March 1964 it recommended that the Congo switch from its parliamentary system to a presidential model of government.

In June 1964, following the withdrawal of ONUC, the communist Kwilu and Simba rebellions overwhelmed the ANC in eastern and central Congo. The weak central government was unable to effectively deal with the problem, so President Joseph Kasa-Vubu dismissed Prime Minister Adoula and requested Tshombe to replace him. Tshombe arrived in the capital on 24 June and assumed the premiership on 9 July. The insurgencies were successfully quelled with the use of former gendarmes and mercenaries, but in October 1965 Kasa-Vubu dismissed Tshombe. In November, Colonel Joseph-Desiré Mobutu seized power in a coup and Tshombe returned to exile in Spain. Though he had designs on a return to power, Tshombe was imprisoned in Algeria in 1967 and remained there until his death.

=== Fate of Katanga's military ===
UN troops began disarming the remainder of the Katangese Gendarmerie after occupying Kolwezi. On 8 February 1963, General Norbert Muke and several of his officers pledged their allegiance to President Kasa-Vubu. In spite of the amnesty and incorporation of Katangese forces into the ANC, many gendarmes remained in hiding, occasionally clashing with government forces. Only 2,000 to 3,000 troops were successfully integrated into the ANC, while the 7,000 untrained gendarmes simply returned to their civilian livelihoods. Approximately 8,000 Katangese soldiers remained unaccounted for.

During the meeting in Kolwezi, Tshombe had ordered all remaining Katangese armed forces to withdraw to Portuguese Angola. Jean Schramme was appointed to be commander of an army in exile, while Jeremiah Puren was ordered to evacuate what remained of the Katangese Air Force, along with necessary military equipment and the Katangese treasury. This was accomplished via air and railway. Rhodesian operatives assisted in smuggling the gold reserves out of the country. The last of Schramme's mercenaries and gendarmes were evacuated on 25 January. Other gendarmes spent the remainder of 1963 in Northern Rhodesia.

Throughout 1963 gendarmes steadily crossed into Angola. Portuguese colonial authorities, eager to assist the anticommunist Katangese, organised them in "refugee" camps. By 1964, two of the four camps had become dedicated training facilities. Mercenaries travelled from Katanga to Angola via Rhodesia to relay messages between Tshombe, the gendarmes and the mercenaries, with logistical support from Southern Rhodesia. Around April, Tshombe appeared to have remobilised his forces. Immediately after becoming prime minister in July, he ordered the exiled Katangese to return to the Congo and mobilised some of those that had been in hiding so that they could suppress the Kwilu and Simba rebels. They were used successfully against the insurgencies, and, following Tshombe's ousting from power, they retained significant political distance from Mobutu's regime. Relations between the two parties quickly worsened, culminating in a bloody mutiny in July 1966.

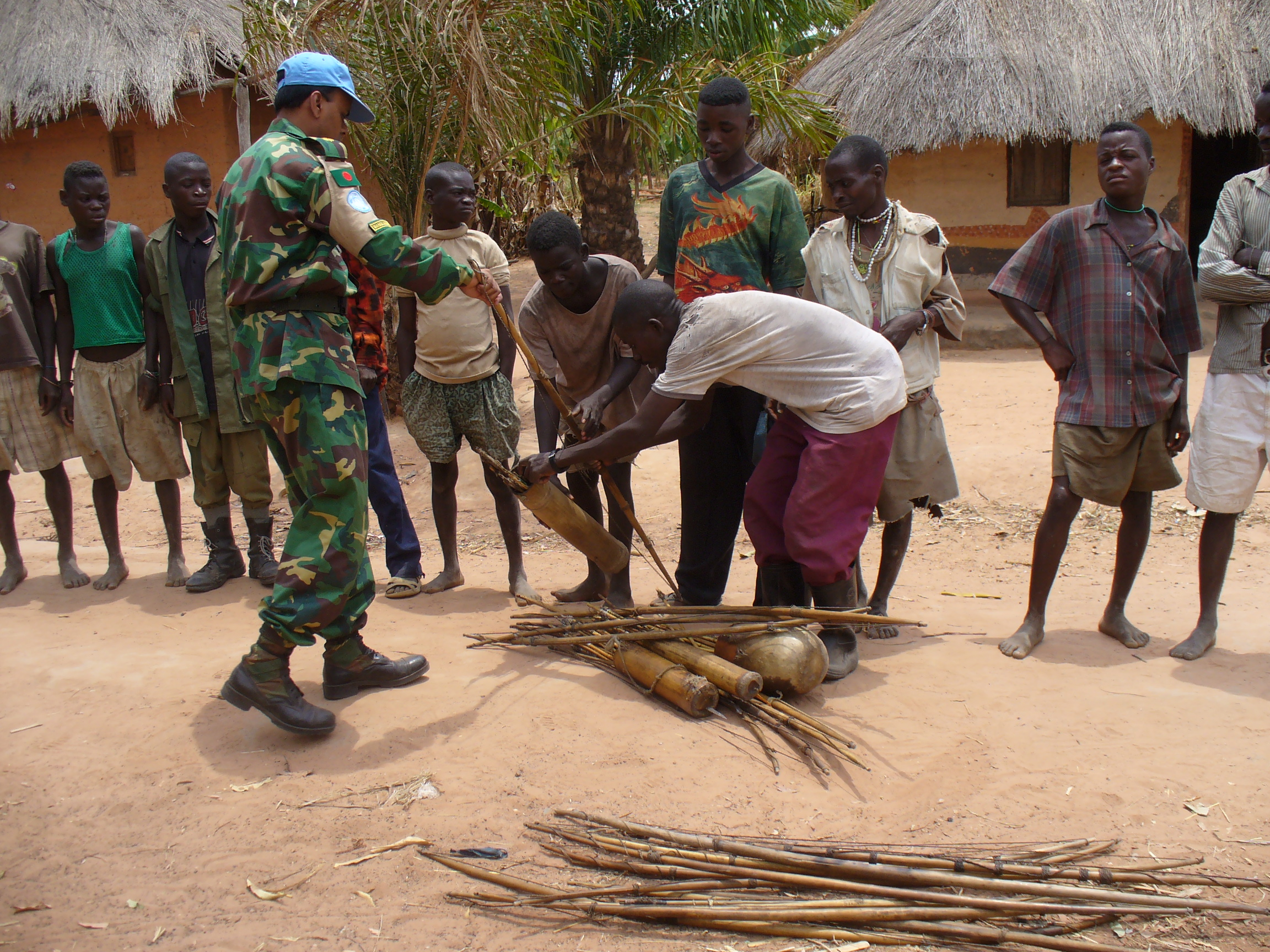
Katangese insurgents surrendering to a UN peacekeeper in 2006

Following their defeat, straggling gendarmes retreated back into Angola. Tshombe began planning to use them to stage an invasion of the Congo, but this was cut short by his imprisonment in Algeria in 1967. They reconstituted themselves as the Front de Libération Nationale Congolaise and made two attempts retake Katanga in the 1970s. Both failed, but secessionist insurgency activity continued. Hostilities resurfaced in 2006 after a new national constitution, which promulgated the division of Katanga into four new provinces, was adopted.

In 2011 a militant named Gédéon Kyungu Mutanga broke out of prison. He remobilised local Mai Mai militias and formed the Mai-Mai Kata Katanga to achieve secession. Conflict in the region dramatically worsened, and in mid-2012 several UN humanitarian agencies began allocating numerous resources to help the civilian population. The United Nations Organisation Stabilisation Mission in the Democratic Republic of the Congo (known as MONUSCO under its French name) provided logistical and advisory assistance to local government officials, police and the military. Many Katangese people hoped that the UN would, in light of their role in ending the original secession, help resolve the situation. Kyungu and many of his forces surrendered in October 2016 to seek a peaceful solution. The ceasefire failed, however, and Mai-Mai Kata Katanga had resumed its insurgency by 2019.
