= Katangese Air Force =

Air force of the State of Katanga

- Force Aérienne Katangaise
- Air Force roundel
- Active: 1960–1963
- Country: Katanga
- Branch: Katangese Armed Forces
- Type: Air force
- Role: Aerial warfare Airlift; Artillery observer Casualty evacuation Fire support Military education and training
- Part of: Katangese Gendarmerie
- Garrison/HQ: Luano and Kolwezi airfields
- Engagements: Congo Crisis; Siege of Jadotville; Operation Grandslam

Commanders
- Commander: Jan Zumbach (1962–63)

Insignia
- Fin flash

Aircraft flown
- Attack: Fouga CM.170 Magister, North American AT-6G Texan

The Katangese Air Force (French: Force aérienne katangaise; FAK), officially the Katangese Military Aviation (French: Aviation militaire Katangaise; AVIKAT), was the air force of the short lived secessionist state the State of Katanga. Established in 1960 under the command of Jan Zumbach, the force consisted predominantly of Belgian, French, and British mercenary pilots, operating a small number of helicopters and smaller number of fixed wing planes, including three attack aircraft delivered by the CIA.

== History ==
=== Katangese Air Force ===
In 1960, the leader of the CONAKAT party Moïse Tshombe, declared Katanga Province's secession from Congo-Léopoldville as the State of Katanga after unrest elsewhere in the Congo and the failure to establish a federalist regime in the country. The newly formed Katangese government requested military aid from Belgium while the Congolese state appealed for assistance to the United Nations. On 17 July 1960 United Nations Security Council Resolution 143 was adopted, which established the United Nations Operation in the Congo (ONUC) and would provide military assistance to the Congolese forces.

In August 1960, Tshombe began to establish military and paramilitary formations under the auspices of the Katangese Gendarmerie. It was also intended to include a small air force established from aircraft formerly used by the colonial-era Aviation militaire de la Force Publique (Avimil). It recruited mercenary pilots, including several veterans who had served in the Royal Air Force during World War II such as the Polish fighter pilot Jan Zumbach.

The primary role of the Katangese Air Force was to provide air support for ground troops and air interdiction. Initial aircraft consisted of five de Havilland Doves, eight North American T-6 Texans, a de Havilland Heron, an Aérospatiale Alouette II helicopter, a Piper PA-18 and a single Sikorsky H-19 helicopter, which were left by the Belgian Air Force during the dissolution of the Belgian Congo. Additionally, nine Fouga CM.170 Magisters were purchased from France in 1961, but only three of these Fougas, which were armed with two machine guns and two locally made light bombs, were delivered by the CIA front organization Seven Seas Airlines. Furthermore, at least six German Dornier Do 28As were imported. The first reached Katanga in late August, with four more arriving in October. The Do 28s were subsequently armed and used mostly for air-to-ground attacks. Based at Luano airfield, Kolwezi and several smaller airfields in the hinterland, the FAK supported the Katangese ground troops by raiding ONUC troops and positions on several occasions. For two years, there was sporadic fighting between Katangese and ONUC forces. By 15 January 1963, the UN had finally established full control over Katanga. Remnants of the Katangese Air Force were all but gone, as most aircraft were destroyed or abandoned. Those that remained in the Congo were reintegrated into the Congolese Air Force.

=== Commanders ===
It was initially commanded by the Belgian Victor Volant. In September 1961, in the aftermath of Operation Rum Punch, Volant left Katanga and command devolved to the Katangese pilot Jean-Marie Ngosa and his Belgian adviser José Delin. In the aftermath of Operation Unokat in December 1961, command first changed over to the South African Jeremiah Cornelius "Jerry" Puren, then, in early 1962, to Jan Zumbach, who commanded Avikat until the end of the Katangese secession in January 1963.

== Alleged role in the death of Dag Hammarskjöld ==
Dag Hammarskjöld, the United Nations Secretary-General, was killed on 18 September 1961 when his aircraft crashed at Ndola, Northern Rhodesia while en route to negotiations with Tshombe. The causes of the crash have never been definitively established but it is generally considered to have been accidental. Nonetheless, there has been speculation that Hammarskjöld's aircraft may have been shot down by the Katangese Air Force. Hammarskjöld's aircraft had taken a detour to avoid the Katangese frontier after widespread coverage of the use of Fouga aircraft by Katangese forces in skirmishes with United Nations forces. According to Bengt Rösiö, this had been "blown out of all proportions" by the international press. There had been discussions about whether a fighter escort should be provided by the Imperial Ethiopian Air Force although this did not occur. Numerous accounts have been suggested. Jan Van Risseghem, a former RAF fighter pilot from Belgium, reportedly claimed to have shot down the aircraft personally but has been widely disbelieved. Another Belgian pilot, known only as "de Beukels", was also reported to have claimed separately to have shot down the aircraft by accident during an attempted aerial abduction of Hammarskjöld.

== Aircraft ==
The following fixed wing aircraft and helicopters were in service from 1960 until 1963:

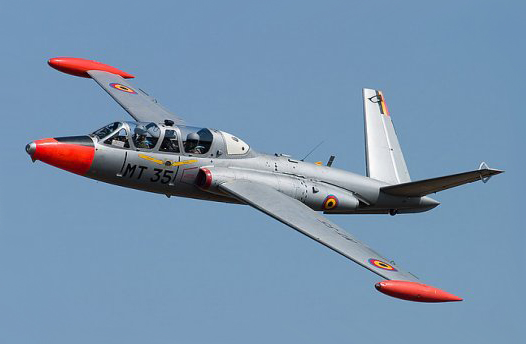
The air force purchased nine Fouga CM.170's similar to this, but only received three.

Aircraft	Origin	Type	Variant	In service	Notes
Combat Aircraft
T-6 Texan	United States	attack	AT-6	8	
Piper PA-22	United States	utility		5	
Fouga CM.170	France	attack / fighter		3	nine purchased, but only three delivered
de Havilland Vampire	United Kingdom	fighter		2	two ex-Portuguese T.11s
Transport
Dornier Do 28	Germany	utility / transport		5	
DH.104 Dove	United Kingdom	transport		5	
DH.114 Heron	United Kingdom	transport		1	
Helicopters
Alouette II	France	utility / liaison		1	
Sikorsky H-19	United States	utility / transport		1	
Trainer Aircraft
Piper PA-18	United States	trainer		1	

== See also ==
- Katangese Gendarmerie
- Rhodesian Air Force
- Bophuthatswana Air Force
