= Lomami Province (former) =

Former province of the Democratic Republic of the Congo

The original Lomami Province was a province of the Democratic Republic of the Congo created from the Kasai province in 1962. It was dissolved and incorporated into the Kasai-Oriental province in 1966. A new Lomami Province was created as part of the 2015 repartitioning.

Presidents (from 1965, governors) of the first Lomami Province were:

- Dominique Manono (15 Sep 1962 - Apr 1966)
- Jean Marie Kikalanga (18 Apr 1966 - 25 Apr 1966)

== See also ==
- Lomami Province, the current unit
