= Aérospatiale Alouette =

The Aérospatiale Alouette is a family of light helicopters manufactured by SNCASE, Sud Aviation, and Aérospatiale:

- SNCASE Alouette - company designation SE.3120; piston-engined, not directly related to the Alouette II.
- Aérospatiale Alouette II - company designation SA 313/SA 318.
- Aérospatiale Lama - company designation SA 315B; hot and high variant of the Alouette II.
- Aérospatiale Alouette III - company designation SA 316/SA 319.
- Aérospatiale Alouette IV - original designation for the Aérospatiale SA 330A Puma.
