= Assassination of Patrice Lumumba =

1961 killing of Congolese independence leader

- Part of the Congo Crisis
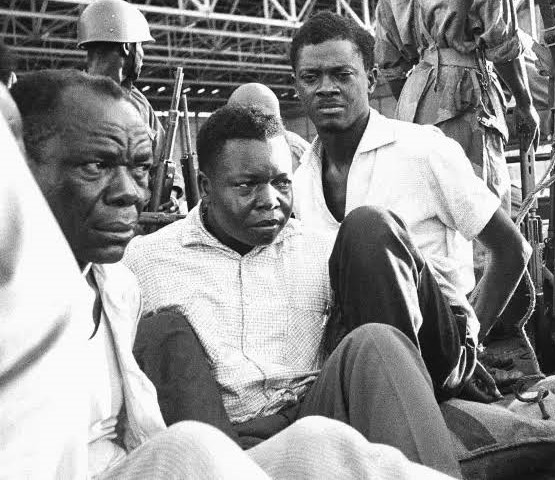
- Lumumba (right) with unidentified aides after his December 1960 capture
- Location: near Mwadingusha, State of Katanga
- Date: January 17, 1961; 9:43 p.m. (UTC+2)
- Attack type: Assassination by firing squad, torture murder
- Victims: Patrice Lumumba; Maurice Mpolo; Joseph Okito
- Perpetrators: Katangan authorities and Belgian officers
- Convictions: None

Patrice Lumumba, inaugural Prime Minister of the Republic of the Congo, Léopoldville and leader of the Congolese National Movement (MNC), was assassinated on January 17, 1961 in Katanga, near Elizabethville, amidst the Congo Crisis that began in July 1960. Following the September 1960 coup led by Mobutu Sese Seko, Lumumba and his political retinue were detained by Mobutu's forces in December 1960. After a month of imprisonment near Léopoldville, he was transferred to Belgium-aligned Katanga in mid-January. The order to kill Lumumba came from the separatist Katangan authorities of Moïse Tshombe, in collaboration with Belgian officers. In the presence of Tshombe and other Katangan officials, Lumumba was executed, alongside Maurice Mpolo and Joseph Okito, by a Katangan firing squad led by Belgian contract officers. Lumumba's body was ultimately dismembered and dissolved in acid.

Prior to his assassination, Western powers sought to remove Lumumba from power. In October 1960, Belgian minister Harold Charles d'Aspremont Lynden wrote in a cable to Katanga that Belgian policy entailed the "definitive elimination of Patrice Lumumba." The United States sought to undermine or kill Lumumba. In August 1960, President Dwight D. Eisenhower authorized an ultimately scrapped Central Intelligence Agency plan to poison him. The killing came three days before the Inauguration of John F. Kennedy, who had expressed support for Lumumba's release from custody. The United Kingdom had also covertly sought the elimination of Lumumba, largely due to British mining interests.

Immediately after Lumumba's assassination, demonstrations and memorials were held throughout the world. In Belgrade and London, protestors demanded the expulsion of the Belgian embassy. In New York City, student protestors overran security at a meeting of the UN Security Council. Malcolm X, who participated in the New York protests, called Lumumba "the greatest black man who ever walked the African continent" in 1964. Jawaharlal Nehru said that his death had made him "infinitely more powerful", and Jean-Paul Sartre commented that, in his death, Lumumba "ceased to be a person and became Africa in its entirety".

In 2001, the Belgian government recognized its complicity in Lumumba's assassination, stating that they bore a "moral responsibility" and offering a formal apology the following year. At the request of Lumumba's daughter Juliana, the Belgian government returned the sole remaining part of his body, a single gold-capped tooth, to the family in 2022. The Democratic Republic of the Congo declared a three-day mourning period upon the repatriation of the tooth, placing it in a public mausoleum in Kinshasa.

== Background ==
The Democratic Republic of Congo became independent on June 30, 1960, with Patrice Lumumba as its first prime minister in the country's bicéphalisme system. Lumumba, who was very critical of Belgium's colonial legacy, became a target of the Belgians. The country was plunged into chaos within a week of independence with a mutiny of the Force Publique national army on July 5 that led to violence between Congolese and European civilians. By July 12, the Belgian military shifted from evacuating Europeans and protecting Belgian fixtures to a policy of military occupation. The Belgian government also sought a way to remove Lumumba, testing whether Congolese Foreign Minister Justin Bomboko would lead a coup d'etat on July 13. In mid-July, Chief of Defence Charles Cumont reported to the Belgian government that the "only course seems to be to get rid of" Lumumba. (Note: After being relieved of direct command over the conflict, Cumont ordered that the military kidnap Lumumba in August. Though soldiers prepared for the operation, they never proceeded.) Lumumba and Congo President Joseph Kasa-Vubu suspended diplomacy with Belgium on July 14.

Katanga became a major locus for opposition to the Lumumba Government when its leader, Moïse Tshombe, declared the province's secession from the Congo on July 11. Business affairs in the region were heavily influenced by European commercial interests, especially Union Minière du Haut-Katanga— the world's third-largest copper producer at the time—which announced that it would only pay tax to the secessionist regime and encouraged Belgium to recognize it. Following the Union Minière, Société Générale de Belgique chairman Paul Gillet called King Baudouin and took the conversation as an endorsement for full recognition of the Katangan regime.

Only prudent, therefore, to plan on basis that Lumumba government threatens our vital interests in Congo and Africa generally. A principal objective of our political and diplomatic action must therefore be to destroy Lumumba government as now constituted, but at the same time we must find or develop another horse to back which would be acceptable in rest of Africa and defensible against Soviet political attack.

— William Burden, US Ambassador to Belgium, 19 July 1960, telegram

On August 9, South Kasai, which bordered Katanga, also declared secession with Belgian support. Two weeks later, Lumumba sent the Congolese National Army (ANC), assisted by Soviet military advisors, into South Kasai to defeat the secessionist regime there. The ANC captured the capital Bakwanga but they committed massacres against Baluba civilians, leading to international condemnation and the withdrawal of ANC forces. Lumumba had previously been rebuffed in seeking military assistance from the United States (as well as the United Nations) on a visit to New York and Washington D.C. in July. Upon his receipt of Soviet assistance in South Kasai, American policy-makers—including President Dwight Eisenhower, Democratic presidential nominee John F. Kennedy, and Secretary of State Christian Herter—uniformly perceived him as pro-Soviet.

== Ouster and house arrest ==
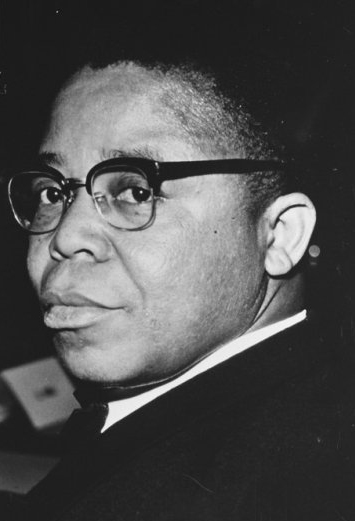
Joseph Kasa-Vubu pictured in early 1960

On September 5, Kasa-Vubu removed Lumumba using a novel interpretation of the Congolese constitution that allowed the co-equal president the right to remove the prime minister. (Note: In August 1960, King Baudouin of Belgium had tried to use the same provision in the Belgian constitution to remove Prime Minister Eyskens, but was rebuffed.) The move came after more than a month of lobbying by Belgian officials in Brazzaville, with the specific tactic suggested by Belgian foreign minister Pierre Wigny. Kasa-Vubu had a tempestuous relationship with Lumumba—differing in style and political philosophy—but resisted a complete capitulation to Western wishes. He deliberated on the decision, repeatedly seeking advice from UN undersecretary Andrew W. Cordier. Just before announcing that Lumumba was to be replaced with Joseph Iléo as prime minister, Kasa-Vubu requested that the UN close the airports nationwide and monitor radio broadcasts in Léopoldville. Overnight on September 6, Lumumba rejected Kasa-Vubu's announcement, appearing multiple times on the radio to instead claim that he was deposing Kasa-Vubu. By midday, Kasa-Vubu requested that the UN restrict radio broadcasts entirely from Léopoldville to prevent Lumumba from continuing on the air. The speed and questionable constitutionality of Lumumba's removal made it appear to be a coup; on September 8, the parliament voted 41 to 2, supporting Lumumba's legitimacy. On the same day, Wigny commented that the execution of his ouster only increased Lumumba's stature. In a briefing to Richard Nixon, the Central Intelligence Agency (CIA) said that it had "at least seriously jeopardized the plan for ousting Lumumba by constitutional means." In the midst of the tensions, the Americans were less sure of Lumumba's removal than the Belgians or the UN representatives were, with Averell Harriman meeting Lumumba and treating him as prime minister on September 9.

Joseph-Desire Mobutu at press conference announcing plan for de facto coup of Kasa-Vubu and Lumumba in September 1960

During a nationwide radio address and subsequent press conference on September 14, Congolese National Army (ANC) chief of staff Joseph-Desire Mobutu announced that the military was rejecting both Kasa-Vubu and Lumumba's claims to legitimacy. Mobutu instead said that technocrats—later established as the College of Commissioners-General—would run the country. As part of Mobutu's plan, the college would exist only until the two conflicting governments reconciled as one, with a planned dissolution of the body set for December 31, 1960.

In the midst of the upheaval, Belgian advisors encouraged Kasa-Vubu and Mobutu to arrest Lumumba for not acceding to his removal. When Kasa-Vubu's allies tried to seize Lumumba on September 12, ANC commander General Victor Lundula intervened and was subsequently dismissed himself. After Mobutu's coup, Lumumba was attacked on September 15 by a group of Baluba detractors, with Ghanaian UN peacekeepers intervening to ensure his safety. Through the end of September, the UN prevailed upon the three parties to refrain from direct conflicts and arrests, though Lumumba's allies Antoine Gizenga and Maurice Mpolo were both themselves arrested and eventually released. As the dynamics shifted between the three parties, the UN under Secretary-General Dag Hammarskjöld shifted away from its previous policy of support for Lumumba's removal and delegitimization to a strong opposition to American and Belgian wishes to arrest him. Hammarskjöld also considered it possible that Lumumba could still validly form a government.

On October 9, Lumumba left his residence in Léopoldville to campaign at local beerhalls for his government's legitimacy. Mobutu sent 200 ANC troops to Lumumba's residence to arrest him the following day. The residence was guarded by UN peacekeepers, who declined entry to the men. Over the month, the army continued to surround his home and harassed his associates. Though the UN had previously rejected attempts to arrest Lumumba, it accepted the de facto house arrest, explicitly refusing to protect him from arrest if he left the residence. As the temporary government settled with Mobutu in control of the army and Kasa-Vubu still vested with some constitutional authority, the two parties resented the continued popularity of Lumumba.

=== Escape attempt ===
Universal Newsreel covering Lumumba's capture and his arrival under detention in Léopoldville on December 2, 1960 before transport to Thysville

On November 27, Lumumba escaped his residence undetected in a three-vehicle convoy, accompanied by family and political allies. He sought to join his allies Gizenga and Lundula in Stanleyville, who were then marshaling forces in the northeast of the country against both Mobutu in the west and separatists in Katanga and Kivu. The Congolese Sûreté Nationale led the search, with funding from the CIA and a reconnaissance plane from the Belgians. Lumumba's path to Stanleyville was made difficult by rainfall. The Léopoldville regime also set up roadblocks and checkpoints at river-crossings, trying to monitor his expected path from above.

The historians Bruce Kuklick and Emmanuel Gerard surmise that the Sûreté was able to spot Lumumba from the air because he made detours to rally the local citizenry. After traveling approximately 600 miles east, Lumumba's convoy started toward Luluabourg, likely to fly the rest of the way to Stanleyville, but local officials intercepted him in Mweka to rebuff his entry to the city. (Note: Luluabourg officials also blocked regime officials from traveling in Luluabourg for their search, forcing them to reroute their plane to Port Francqui.) The convoy then went north to Lodi. They planned there to ferry across the Sankuru River, but were captured at that river-crossing on December 1 by ANC soldiers. UN peacekeepers from Ghana oversaw the arrest, allowing it to go forward.

=== Capture ===
Lumumba was returned from Port Francqui to Léopoldville, arriving on December 2. The Léopoldville regime immediately sought to transfer him to Katanga, with Belgian advisor Louis Marliere radioing Moïse Tshombe in Elizabethville. (Note: The radio message—sent from Marliere's headquarters in Brazzaville—asked whether "the Jew" (Tshombe) would be willing to receive "Satan" (Lumumba).) When Tshombe declined, the regime transferred him to Camp Hardy in Thysville, 150 km (about 100 miles) from Léopoldville.

Lumumba's poor treatment in the recapture and Camp Hardy received negative attention from the global press. In a widely disseminated video, Mobutu was shown smiling while ANC guards beat the bound Lumumba; they also force-fed him a paper version of a speech that he had given. Lumumba and his associates were fed poorly by the prison guards, as per Mobutu's orders. In Lumumba's last documented letter, he wrote to Rajeshwar Dayal, head of the UN in the Congo: "In a word, we are living amid absolutely impossible conditions; moreover, they are against the law."

== Assassination ==
The state of the Congo Crisis, circa 1961

Late on January 12, 1961, soldiers at Camp Hardy mutinied. Some officers were taken prisoner and mutineers raped multiple wives of officers. Most soldiers demanded Lumumba's release and the formation of his government. Others thought he was dangerous and that he should be transferred elsewhere. There was also widespread dissatisfaction with pay levels. The camp's commandant Louis Bobozo was away from Thysville during the uprising. The next morning, Kasa Vubu, Mobutu, Victor Nendaka, Justin Bomboko, and Joseph Ileo arrived at Camp Hardy to address the crisis. The group met with Lumumba, though it's unknown what they spoke about. (Note: Journalist Madeleine G. Kalb wrote that the group promised his release and offered him a post in a government under Joseph Ileo, but that Lumumba rejected anything but a legitimate government under himself. Ludo De Witte dismisses Kalb as "probably wrong".) The mutiny ended with a promise from Bomboko to increase soldiers' pay.

The mutiny in Thysville and another uprising at Camp Nkokolo in Léopoldville demonstrated to the government and its foreign partners that pro-Lumumba sentiment persisted within the army. At the time, CIA station chief Larry Devlin predicted that the government was near collapse and Lumumba was likely to return to power, writing to Washington that "Refusal [to] take drastic steps at this time will lead to defeat of [US] policy in Congo." After the Thysville mutiny, Belgian Foreign Minister Wigny and Harold Charles d'Aspremont Lynden discussed whether Lumumba should be killed in Thysville or transferred, eventually agreeing on removing him to Bakwanga in South Kasai or Katanga. Both locations were understood as likely to result in his death. The leader of South Kasai Albert Kalonji had vowed to turn Lumumba's skull into a vase, whereas Katanga considered him the main threat to their independence, with the interior minister Godefroid Munongo warning Lumumba never to set foot in the region. Eventually, the Belgians and the Léopoldville regime decided on Katanga, partly due to its strong connections with Belgium and it being less overtly hostile toward Lumumba than South Kasai. Devlin learned of the plans on January 14, but did not report them to his superiors until January 17, when they were already in progress.

Tshombe had previously rejected the transfer in December, but agreed at the insistence of his Belgian allies in January. Kasa-Vubu and Tshombe, with mediator Albert Delvaux, also made an agreement, wherein Tshombe would receive the three politicians while the Léopoldville regime would eventually capture and transfer Tshombe's major rival Jason Sendwe. Though Tshombe mentioned this agreement multiple times to American and Belgian associates, Sendwe was not captured in Léopoldville or delivered to Katangan custody. Historians Emmanuel Gerard and Bruce Kuklick hypothesized that Kasa-Vubu declined to follow through, believing that doing so would help Tshombe consolidate power. The Léopoldville government also sent Maurice Mpolo—who had previously been a leader in the ANC, rivalling Mobutu —and Joseph Okito—who would control the Senate if Joseph Iléo resumed being prime minister after the College of Commissioners-General period—for their potential to challenge the regime. (Note: Mpolo, who had also been attempting to escape to Stanleyville, had been arrested by Mobutu's troops in Mushie, while Okito had been detained near Kikwit.)

On January 17, Victor Nendaka of the Sûreté Nationale accompanied the prisoners under ANC guard from a small airfield in Lukala west to the coastal city of Moanda. From there, they transferred Lumumba, Mpolo, and Okito to a DC-4 plane to ferry them east to Elizabethville. Nendaka sought to avoid UN observers and international press during the transfer, to minimize blowback. For the Moanda-Elizabethville leg, Nendaka transferred custody to government commissioners Ferdinand Kazadi and Jonas Mukamba Kadiata Nzemba, instructing them to route to Elizabethville, rather than the previously discussed destination of Bakwanga. Throughout the flight, the guards beat the prisoners, drawing complaints from the pilots. When the guards refused to relent, the pilots locked the cockpit door, fearing they might damage the plane.

The primarily Belgian-led Katangese Gendarmerie took custody of the prisoners, commandeering the nearby house of farmer Lucien Brouwez for their detention. Tshombe called for a meeting of his war cabinet approximately two hours after Lumumba's 4:30 p.m. arrival in Katanga, where he and Interior Minister Munongo spoke of their plan to kill the prisoners. After the meeting, at 8:30, the local Belgian police commissioner Frans Verscheure (Note: Interior Minister Godefroid Munongo purposefully included Frans Verscheure, as he had been identified in newspapers as Lumumba's accompaniment during his January 1960 release from Belgian custody. The notoriety negatively associated him with the colonial legacy. As Verscheure recalled in 2001, Munongo mistakenly thought he wanted revenge on Lumumba.) was instructed to transport Lumumba, Mpolo, and Okito from Brouwez to a new location. During their transport, Mpolo soiled himself and all three men had wooden splinters hammered under their fingernails, causing them significant pain.

Katangan leaders Moïse Tshombe (left) and Godefroid Munongo, who were both present at the killing, pictured in 1965

By 9:30 p.m., they had arrived at the chosen site on a remote dirt road near Mwadingusha. Tshombe, Munongo, and Jean-Baptiste Kibwe were already there to observe, with members of the Gendarmie and Katangan army. There was a pre-made burial site—dug out of the red mud—and a firing squad of four men mustered for each of the men. Belgian officer Julien Gat commanded each of the three firing squads.

Verscheure recalled that Okito was shot first, Mpolo second, and Lumumba last. He encouraged them to say their prayers. Okito requested that someone look after his seven children in Léopoldville but was rebuffed. Mpolo was shot midway through reciting the Lord's Prayer. At his turn, Lumumba remained non-reactive, with Verscheure characterizing him as "silent from the beginning to the end." Following the killing, the group of army and police covered the bodies and left. Lwimba Movati Ndjibu and his father saw the lights of the group on the way home from an antelope hunt and hid behind a nearby termite mound while the killing took place. They returned the next morning to find the bodies partially buried, with the victims' feet all uncovered. There are no photographs of the killing or its direct aftermath and little other documentary evidence. One exception is Verscheure's entry into his datebook, "9:43 L Dead", (Note: In Flemish, "9:43 L dood", which he later overwrote to say "9:43 L doorgevoerd", meaning "L transferred".) which did not come to public attention until 2001 investigations by Belgium.

=== Exhumation ===
The following morning, January 18, Katangan Interior Minister Godefroid Munongo, panicked by reports that the burial of the three bodies had been observed, ordered Gendarmie officer Gerard Soete and other members of the execution team, including Verscheure, to dig up the corpses. Soete, with Verscheure and nine police officers, went back to the site of the killing on the night of January 18. They dug up the three men and transported them to a new burial site in Kasenga, near the border with Northern Rhodesia.

==== Second exhumation and dissolution ====
On January 21, Munongo ordered that Lumumba be re-exhumed, dismembered, and then dissolved, "so that not a finger bone remains, not a tooth." Soete worked with his brother Michel, who worked in the Katangan public works department, and some assistants to carry out the dissolution of the bodies. They set up road signs to make their work look like construction and spent two days destroying the bodies. The group used saws to reduce the size of the bodies enough to fit into a barrel of sulfuric acid, which was provided by Union Minière du Haut-Katanga. When teeth and bones proved resistant to the acid, the Soete brothers used fire to burn as much as possible of the remains. Throughout, the group made the stench of their work more tolerable by drinking whisky. After completing their task, they spread ashes and other indestructible remnants out of the window of the truck on their way back to Elizabethville. Soete had taken multiple trophies from Lumumba's body, including a finger and a pair of his gold-capped teeth.

== Announcement of death and reactions ==
Protests in Belgrade outside Belgian embassy on February 14, 1961

Lumumba's widow Pauline Opango marches with breasts bared in mourning in Léopoldville

On February 13, Godefroid Munongo announced to reporters that Lumumba, Mpolo, and Okito had been killed in Katanga. In his version, Munongo described the three men as having escaped Katangan custody. Munongo claimed that they then arrived in a small Katangan village on February 12, where residents killed the men. Munongo reinforced his argument that the government was not involved:

I know that people will say this has been a plot and that the Katanga Government assassinated Lumumba... I will speak frankly: If people accuse us of killing Lumumba, I will reply "Prove it."

Prior to the statement, rumors that Lumumba was dead had been persistent. On January 18, Katangan Secretary of State of Information Lucas Samalenge was one of the first people to reveal Lumumba's death. Samalenge went to the bar Le Relais in Élisabethville and bragged that he had seen the killing, kicking Lumumba's corpse.

Lumumba's assassination sparked protests in at least twenty countries, including Belgium, the United Kingdom, Ghana, China, Venezuela, and the United States. In Belgrade, protesters sacked the Belgian embassy and confronted the police, and in London, a crowd marched from Trafalgar Square to the Belgian embassy, where a letter of protest was delivered and protesters clashed with police. In New York City, a demonstration at the United Nations Security Council turned violent and continued in the streets. After his death his significance grew. Jawaharlal Nehru said that his death had made him "infinitely more powerful", and Jean-Paul Sartre commented that, in his death, Lumumba "ceased to be a person and became Africa in its entirety". In 1964, Malcolm X called Lumumba "the greatest black man who ever walked the African continent".

== Foreign involvement ==
=== Belgian involvement ===
The drama that has befallen a great part of the land is for me a constant source of distress; an association of 80 years, like that which has united our two peoples, has created affectionate bonds too strong to be dissolved by the politics of a single man.

— King Baudouin of Belgium, in October 1960 letter to Moïse Tshombe and advisor Guy Weber

Belgian Julien Gat gave the orders to fire, while Belgian police commissioner Frans Verscheure controlled the transport of the prisoners to the site. In the early 21st century, Ludo De Witte found documents challenging the idea that Belgian officers operating in Katanga only took orders from the Katangan authorities. De Witte suggests that Belgian officers were also following Belgian government policy and orders, with Gat and other Belgians maintaining contact with government sources. Tshombe and the Katangan leadership also maintained contact with Belgian Minister for African Affairs Harold Charles d'Aspremont Lynden and King Baudouin of Belgium. In October, d'Aspremont Lynden had called for "the definitive elimination of Lumumba" in a telex with instructions for Godefroid Munongo.

Tshombe maintained a line of communication for King Baudouin through his main military advisor, Major Guy Weber. In one October 24 letter to Baudouin's chief of staff, Weber reported out a meeting between Tshombe and Mobutu in October and the agreement to kill Lumumba in the new year:

An excellent meeting. In exchange for some financial support, Mobutu agrees to the recommendations: Status quo until December 31— They see what the lay of the land is— They neutralize completely (and if possible physically . . . ) Lumumba.

Responding to the letter from Tshombe and Weber on October 28, Baudouin expressed resolution against Lumumba, writing that Belgium and the Congo were too joined together to allow Lumumba's intercession. In his original draft, Baudouin referred to Lumumba's politics as "malevolent".

Evidence showed Belgium also conducted a significant covert intervention effort. The Belgian government financially supported anti-Lumumba politicians, opposition newspapers, clandestine radio operations, and propaganda networks designed to weaken Lumumba's authority. Prime Minister Gaston Eyskens, working through adviser Jef Van Bilsen, directly pressured Congolese President Kasa-Vubu to dismiss Lumumba from office. Belgium's Mission Technique Belge (Mistebel), operating as a shadow administration in Katanga, also received orders specifying that the "definitive elimination" of Lumumba was a central objective aligned with Belgian strategic interests.

=== United States involvement ===
Political scientist Stephen R. Weissman—who also served as a staff director for the U.S. House Subcommittee on Africa—wrote that the CIA's covert intervention during the Congo Crisis became the largest such operation in the agency’s history up to that point, costing between $122 million and $204 million in 2025 dollars, and designed explicitly to keep Congo aligned with Western geopolitical interests. CIA officers worked closely with Belgian intelligence, jointly funding anti-Lumumba senators, political demonstrations, labor disruptions, and propaganda campaigns aimed at destabilizing Lumumba's government.

CIA station chief Larry Devlin urged Lumumba's removal in cables throughout the early Congo Crisis. John Stockwell, a CIA officer in the Congo and later a CIA station chief, wrote in 1978 that the CIA base chief in Elizabethville was in direct contact with Lumumba's killers on the night he was executed. Stockwell, who knew Devlin well, believed that Devlin knew more than anyone else about the murder.

In August 1960, Eisenhower authorized a CIA operation to assassinate Lumumba. The CIA's method involved CIA station chief Larry Devlin using botulinum toxin to poison Lumumba's food or toothpaste. CIA chief chemist Sidney Gottlieb delivered the toxic materials in September 1960, but Devlin failed to enact the plot. A second CIA officer, Michael Mulroney, was asked by Richard Bissell to continue the plan in November 1960, but he declined, instead preferring to focus on delivering Lumumba to the hostile custody of his Congolese detractors. The plot to poison him was eventually abandoned. Devlin testified in 1975 that he had given instructions to assassinate Lumumba.

==== Role of John F. Kennedy ====
The impending inauguration of John F. Kennedy in January 1961 caused fear among the anti-Lumumba faction, and within the CIA, that the incoming Kennedy administration would favor the imprisoned Lumumba. Kennedy's brother and campaign manager Ted Kennedy visited Léopoldville with Senators Frank Church (D-ID) and Frank Moss (D-UT), where he called for the release of all Congolese political prisoners. President-elect Kennedy dismissed his brother's comments as unrelated to his own foreign policy, but some of his political advisors were then considering whether Lumumba should be released from custody and re-established in the country's politics.

Lumumba was killed three days before Kennedy's inauguration on January 20th, though Kennedy did not learn of the killing until February 13. Kennedy was informed by United Nations ambassador Adlai Stevenson. According to Jacques Lowe, who was with him at the time, "his hand went to his head in utter despair, 'Oh, no,' I heard him groan." Though Kennedy sympathized with Lumumba, his presidency continued the strategy of the Eisenhower administration toward the Congo Crisis. Stevenson and the UN team sought to push out Rajeshwar Dayal, who was seen as too sympathetic to the Lumumba faction.

==== Church Committee ====
The 1975 Church Committee found that while the CIA had conspired to kill Lumumba, it was not directly involved in the murder. It found that CIA chief Allen Dulles had previously ordered Lumumba's assassination as "an urgent and prime objective". Furthermore, declassified CIA cables quoted or mentioned in the Church report discuss two specific CIA plots to murder Lumumba: the poison plot and a shooting plot. The Church Committee’s findings complemented Belgium’s 2001 parliamentary inquiry “definitively expos[ing] the guilt of Belgium,” prompting the Belgian government to issue an official apology.

=== United Kingdom involvement ===
In June 2001, newly discovered documents by Ludo De Witte revealed that while the US and Belgium actively plotted to murder Lumumba, the British government secretly wanted him "got rid of" because they believed he posed a serious threat to British interests in the Congo, such as mining facilities in Katanga. In September 1960, Howard Smith—of the Foreign Office's African department—endorsed the "simple" solution of "ensuring Lumumba's removal from the scene by killing him." Smith's notion was endorsed by Assistant Under-Secretary Archibald Ross. Others, including Lord Privy Seal Ted Heath and Deputy Under-Secretary of State Roger Stevens, preferred more moderate means of removing Lumumba from power.

In April 2013, in a letter to the London Review of Books, British parliamentarian David Lea reported having discussed Lumumba's death with MI6 officer Daphne Park shortly before she died in March 2010. Park had been posted to Léopoldville at the time of Lumumba's death, and was later a semi-official spokesperson for MI6 in the House of Lords. According to Lea, when he mentioned "the uproar" surrounding Lumumba's abduction and murder, and recalled the theory that MI6 might have had "something to do with it", Park replied, "We did. I organized it." The BBC reported that, subsequently, "Whitehall sources" described the claims of MI6 involvement as "speculative".

UN Secretary-General Dag Hammarskjöld frequently coordinated anti-Lumumba strategies with both the United States and the United Kingdom, reflecting broader Western alignment against Lumumba under the guise of UN neutrality.

== Belgian commission ==
In September 1999, Ludo De Witte published De moord op Lumumba. (Note: A French-language edition of the book (L’Assassinat de Lumumba) was published in January 2000, followed by an English-language version in July.) The Flemish-language book argued for Belgium's ultimate culpability in Lumumba's death, using access to the Belgian archives as well as interviews with some subjects. It excited the Flemish press and coincided with an October interview by Gerard Soete in the Flemish-language magazine Humo, where he spoke of his role in Lumumba's dismemberment. In an issue of De Standaard, the prominent writer Hugo Claus published his poem entitled "Lumumba's Teeth". Far-right Flemish party Vlaams Blok requested that the government respond to the claims of de Witte and the press, seeking a defense of the monarchy especially. On December 8, 1999, Foreign Minister Louis Michel said he would support the formation of a committee, regardless of whether it exonerated or condemned the Belgian approach.

The commission was officially approved by the Belgian Parliament in March 2000, originally set to last one year. A wide swathe of the parliamentarians supported the initiative, with the ruling Liberal Party especially behind it. Chaired by Geert Versnick, the commission sought to achieve three goals: a full factual record of the lead-up to Lumumba's death, an understanding of the related context, and assessment of what role each of the different parties played in his death. To do so, the commission empaneled a group of prominent historians to form its own record—based on interviews and the Belgian archives—independent of the work of de Witte and a previous pro-Belgian history by Jacques Brassinne de La Buissière. The historians reserved the judgment for the commissioners, but concluded that:

It can be stated with certainty that the Belgian government authorities helped to oust Lumumba from power, then opposed any reconciliation with him, and tried to prevent his return to power. They insisted that he be arrested, but not that he be tried. They supported Lumumba's transfer to Katanga, without ruling out, through appropriate measures, the possibility that he might be executed there. (Note: In French: On peut affirmer avec certitude que les instances gouvernementales belges ont aidé à chasser Lumumba du pouvoir, se sont ensuite opposées à toute réconciliation avec ce dernier et ont tenté d’empêcher son retour au pouvoir. Elles ont insisté pour qu’il soit arrêté, mais pas pour qu’il soit jugé. Elles ont appuyé le transfert de Lumumba au Katanga, sans exclure, par des mesures appropriées, la possibilité qu’il y soit mis à mort.)

=== Apology ===
In its November 2001 report, the commission determined that the Belgian government had lied to the public, contravened international law, and bore a "moral responsibility" for Lumumba's killing, though it denied that any written order to kill Lumumba existed. British reporter Ian Black wrote that it was the first time since the royal question era that the parliament had criticized the monarchy. On February 5, 2002, Louis Michel spoke to Parliament on behalf of the government, saying that he wished to share "deep and sincere regrets" to Lumumba's family and the country as a whole for Belgium's role in the killing. Michel also offered "apologies for the pain inflicted on them by the apathy and cold indifference."

=== Attempted prosecution ===
In June 2025, the Belgian federal prosecutor's office requested that Étienne Davignon, a former Belgian junior diplomatic intern in the Congo and later a close associate of King Baudouin, be tried for alleged participation in war crimes related to Lumumba's arrest in late 1960 including unlawful detention, deprivation of a fair trial, and torture. Prosecutors dismissed a charge of intent to kill. Prosecutors alleged that Davignon had knowledge of the plan to arrest Lumumba.

The 2001 Belgian parliamentary inquiry said that Davignon was "tasked with convincing then-Congolese President Joseph Kasa Vubu to dismiss Lumumba [as prime minister] and providing him with the necessary legal arguments." Davignon had written a telex in September 1960 stating that it was a "primordial problem to remove Lumumba and achieve unity of the Congolese leaders against him". In March 2026, the Brussels Criminal Court’s Council Chamber decided that Davignon would stand trial. Davignon denied the charges. He died on May 18, 2026.

== Repatriation of remains ==
The mausoleum of Patrice Lumumba was inaugurated in 2022 in Kinshasa at the place de l'Échangeur.

On June 30, 2020, Lumumba's daughter, Juliana Lumumba, appealed directly in a letter to Philippe, King of the Belgians, for the return of "the relics of Patrice Émery Lumumba to the ground of his ancestors", describing her father as "a hero without a grave". The letter stated: "Why, after his terrible murder, have Lumumba's remains been condemned to remain a soul forever wandering, without a grave to shelter his eternal rest?" On 10 September 2020, a Belgian judge ruled that Lumumba's remains – which then consisted of just a single gold-capped tooth (Gerard Soete had lost the other tooth of Lumumba between 1999 and 2020) – must be returned to his family.

In May 2021, Congolese President Félix Tshisekedi announced that there would be a repatriation of the last remains of Lumumba, however, the handover ceremony was delayed because of the COVID-19 pandemic. On June 9, 2022, during a speech in the DRC to the country's parliament, King Philippe reiterated regrets for Belgium's colonial past in its former colony, describing Belgian rule as a "regime ... of unequal relations, unjustifiable in itself, marked by paternalism, discrimination and racism" that "led to violent acts and humiliations".

On June 20, Lumumba's children received the remains of their father during a ceremony at Egmont Palace in Brussels, where the federal prosecutor formally handed custody to the family. The Belgian Prime Minister, Alexander De Croo, apologized on behalf of the Belgian government for his country's role in Lumumba's assassination: "For my part, I would like to apologize here, in the presence of his family, for the way in which the Belgian government influenced the decision to end the life of the country's first prime minister [. . .] A man was murdered for his political convictions, his words, his ideals".

A mausoleum to Patrice Lumumba was built in Kinshasa to house his remains. The government of the Democratic Republic of the Congo declared three days of national mourning. The burial coincided with the 61st anniversary of his famous independence day speech. An investigation by Belgian prosecutors for "war crimes" related to Lumumba's murder is ongoing. His remains were laid to rest June 30, 2022. On November 18, 2024, the mausoleum was vandalized and Lumumba's coffin broken, with the interior ministry saying that his tooth was safe.
