= Guy-Patrice Lumumba =

Son of Congolese politician Patrice Lumumba

Guy-Patrice Lumumba, also known as Patrice Lumumba Guy, is the son of murdered Congolese Prime Minister and Pan-Africanist Patrice Émery Lumumba. His arrest in December 2005 was mentioned in the British House of Commons. He ran independently for President of Democratic Republic of the Congo in 2006, but received only about 0.42% of the vote. The World Socialist Website indicates he signed a complaint regarding the elections, claiming voter bribery and excess ballot sheets.

In April 2021, Lumumba declared that he opposed the return of the relics of his father, a finger and two teeth collected by Gerard Soete, under the regime of Félix Tshisekedi.
