= Patrice Lumumba =

Congolese politician and independence leader (1925–1961)

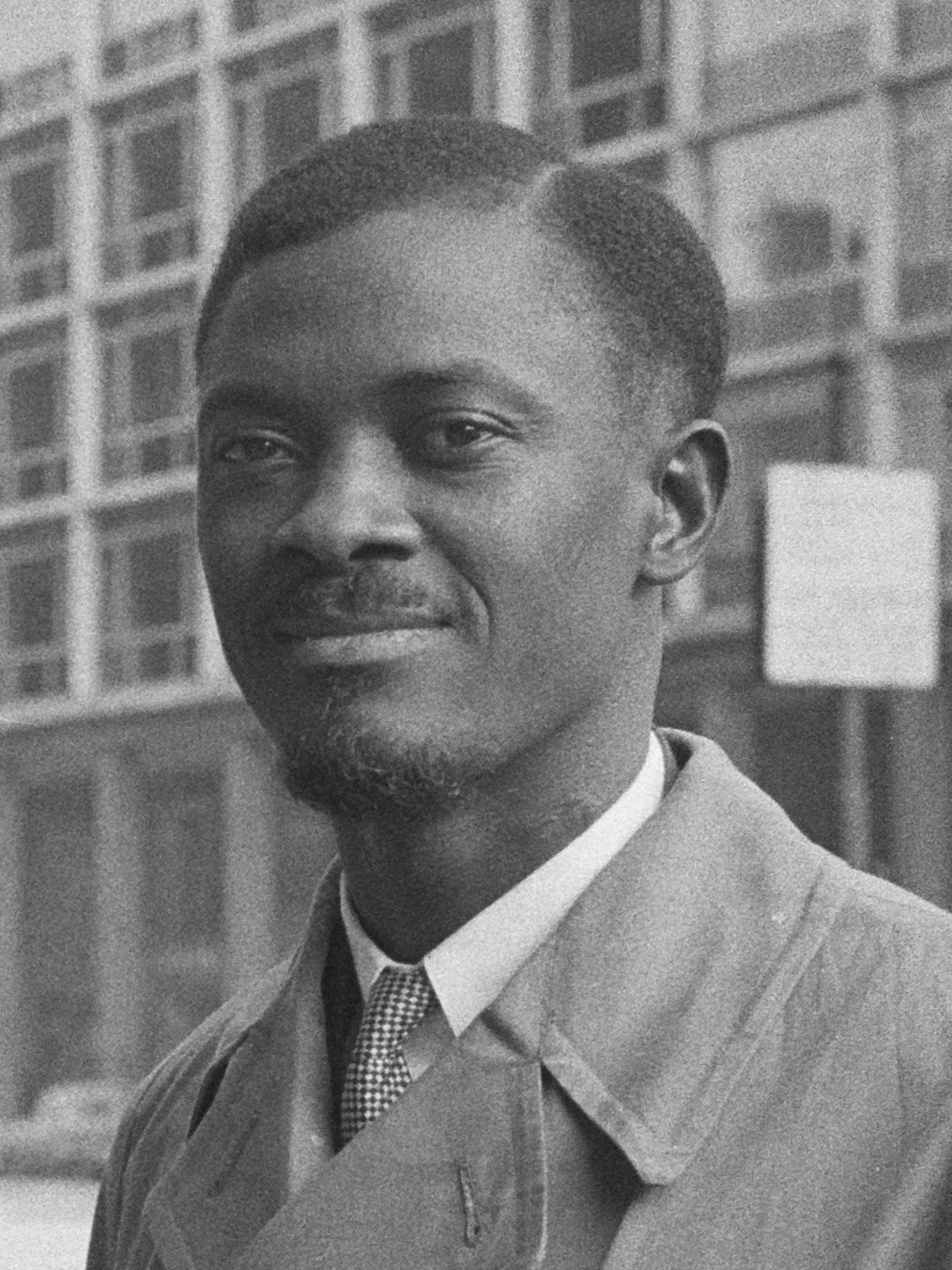
- Lumumba in 1960

1st Prime Minister of the Democratic Republic of the Congo
- In office 24 June 1960 – 5 September 1960 (Note: Though Lumumba was dismissed from his post on 5 September 1960 by President Kasa-Vubu, Parliament continued to recognise his authority. Lumumba rivaled his replacement, Iléo, over control of the government until a coup d'état on 14 September definitively suspended the parliamentary system and removed both from power.)
- President: Joseph Kasa-Vubu
- Deputy: Antoine Gizenga
- Preceded by: Office established
- Succeeded by: Joseph Iléo

1st Minister of National Defense
- In office 24 June 1960 – 5 September 1960
- Prime Minister: Himself
- Preceded by: Office established
- Succeeded by: Ferdinand Kazadi (Note: As Commissioner-General for National Defence.)

Personal details
- Born: Isaïe Tasumbu Tawosa; 2 July 1925 Katakokombe, Congo-Kasaï, Belgian Congo (Note: Now Sankuru, Democratic Republic of the Congo)
- Died: 17 January 1961 (aged 35) near Élisabethville, State of Katanga (Note: Now Lubumbashi, Democratic Republic of the Congo)
- Cause of death: Assassination by firing squad
- Party: MNC
- Spouse(s): Henriette Maletaua (m. 1945; div. 1947) Hortense Sombosia (m. 1947; div. 1951) Pauline Opango (m. 1951)
- Children: François Lumumba; Guy-Patrice Lumumba; Roland-Gilbert Lumumba; Juliana Lumumba; Marie-Christine Lumumba

Patrice Émery Lumumba (Note: Alternatively found as Patrice Hemery Lumumba.) (/pəˈtriːs lʊˈmʊmbə/ pə-TREESS luu-MUUM-bə; born Isaïe Tasumbu Tawosa; 2 July 1925 – 17 January 1961) was a Congolese politician, independence leader, and revolutionary who served as the first prime minister of the First Congolese Republic (modern day Democratic Republic of the Congo) from June until September 1960, following his party's success in the May 1960 election. Lumumba was the leader of the Congolese National Movement (MNC) from 1958 until his assassination in 1961. Ideologically an African nationalist and pan-Africanist, he played a significant role in the transformation of the Congo from a colony of Belgium into an independent republic.

Shortly after Congolese independence in June 1960, an army mutiny marked the beginning of the Congo Crisis. Both Katanga and South Kasai declared independence, which Lumumba responded to by sending the Congolese army to put down the secessions. This created a political crisis that resulted in then President Joseph Kasa-Vubu dismissing Lumumba and his government. This was followed by a coup led by Mobutu Sese Seko. Lumumba attempted to escape to Stanleyville to join his supporters who had established a new anti-Mobutu state called the Free Republic of the Congo, but he was captured by state authorities under Mobutu, and sent to Elisabethville in Katanga. He was tortured and later executed by the separatist Katangan authorities of Moïse Tshombe, alongside Belgian mercenaries. His body was later dissolved in acid. In 2002, Belgium formally apologised for its role in the execution, admitting "moral responsibility". In 2022, Lumumba's tooth was returned by the Belgian government to his family.

Lumumba is widely seen as a martyr for anti-colonial liberation and the pan-African movement.

== Early life and career ==
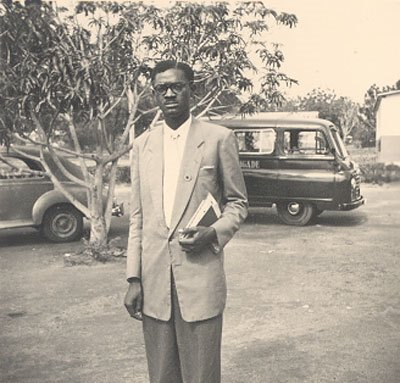
Photograph of Lumumba, c. 1950s

Patrice Lumumba was born on 2 July 1925 as Isaïe Tasumbu Tawosa to Julienne Wamato Lomendja and her husband, François Tolenga Otetshima, a farmer, in Onalua, in the Katakokombe region of the Kasaï province of the Belgian Congo. He was a member of the Tetela ethnic group, where he was referred to with the name Élias Okit'Asombo. His original surname means "heir of the cursed" and is derived from the Tetela words okitá/okitɔ́ ('heir', 'successor') and asombó ('cursed or bewitched people who will die quickly'). He had three brothers (Charles Lokolonga, Émile Kalema, and Louis Onema Pene Lumumba) and one half-brother (Jean Tolenga). Raised in a Catholic family, he was educated at a Protestant primary school, a Catholic missionary school, and finally the government post office training school, where he passed the one-year course with distinction. He was known for being a vocal, precocious young man, regularly pointing out the errors of his teachers in front of his peers. This outspoken nature would come to define his life and career. Lumumba spoke Tetela, French, Lingala, Swahili, and Tshiluba.

Outside of his regular studies, Lumumba took an interest in the Enlightenment ideals of Jean-Jacques Rousseau and Voltaire. He was also fond of Molière and Victor Hugo. He wrote poetry, and many of his works had anti-imperialist themes. He worked as a travelling beer salesman in Léopoldville and as a postal clerk in Stanleyville for eleven years. Lumumba married three times. He married his first wife Henriette Maletaua a year after arriving in Stanleyville in 1945; they divorced in 1947. In the same year, he married Hortense Sombosia, but this relationship also fell apart and they divorced in 1951. He began an affair with Pauline Kie while still married to Hortense. While he had no children with his first two wives, his relationship with Kie resulted in a son, François Lumumba. Though he remained close with Kie until his death, Lumumba ultimately ended their affair to marry Pauline Opangu in 1951, who was 14 years old at the time.

In the period following World War II, young leaders across Africa increasingly worked for national goals and independence from the colonial powers. In 1952 he was hired to work as a personal assistant for French sociologist Pierre Clément, who was performing a study of Stanleyville. That year he also co-founded and subsequently became president of a Stanleyville chapter of the Association des Anciens élèves des pères de Scheut (ADAPÉS), an alumni association for former students at Scheut schools, even though he had never attended one. In 1955, Lumumba became regional head of the Cercles of Stanleyville and joined the Liberal Party of Belgium. He edited and distributed party literature. Between 1956 and 1957 he wrote his autobiography (which was published posthumously in 1962). After a study tour in Belgium in 1956, he was arrested on charges of embezzlement of $2500 from the post office. He was convicted, and sentenced one year later to 12 months' imprisonment and a fine.

== Leader of the MNC ==
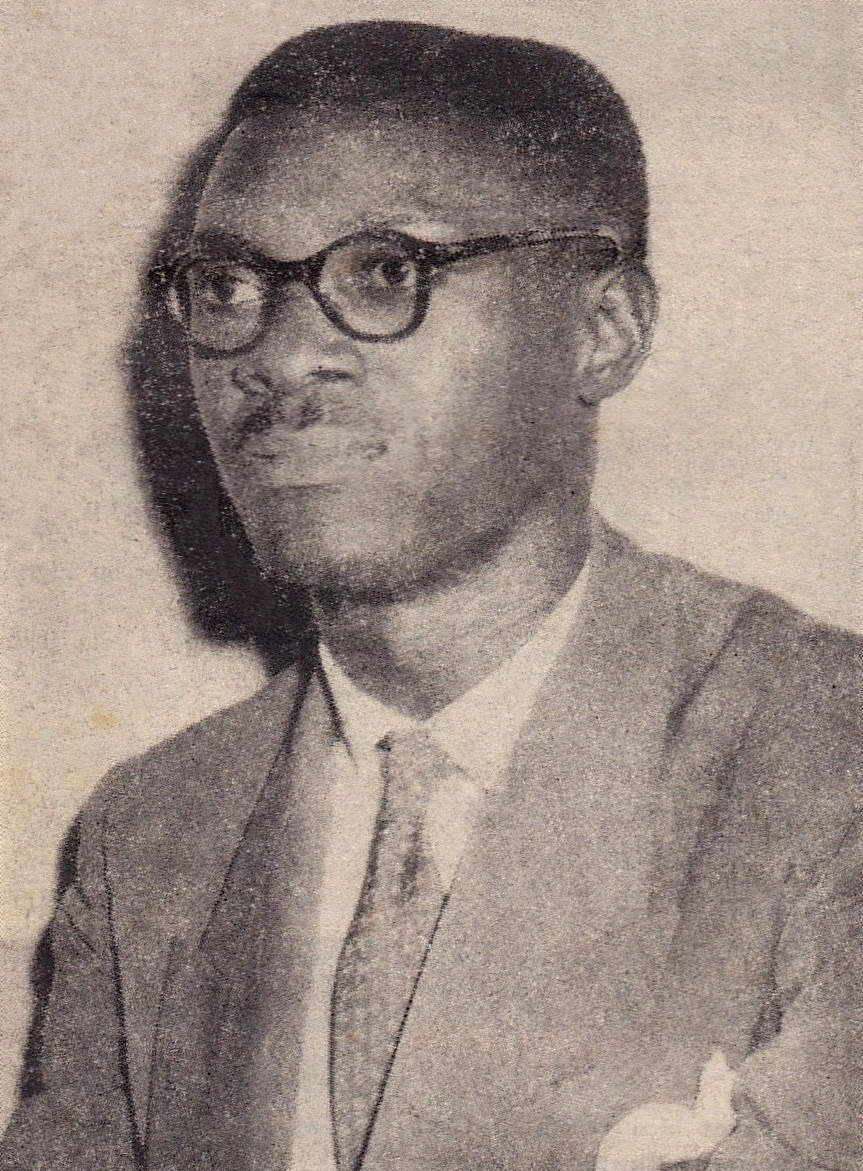
Lumumba in 1958

After his release, Lumumba helped found the Mouvement National Congolais (MNC) party in 1958 and quickly became the organisation's leader. The MNC, unlike other Congolese parties developing at the time, did not draw on a particular ethnic base. It promoted a platform that included independence, gradual Africanisation of the government, state-led economic development, and neutrality in foreign affairs. Lumumba had a large popular following and as a result, he had more political autonomy than contemporaries who were more dependent on Belgian connections. Lumumba was one of the delegates who represented the MNC at the All-African Peoples' Conference in Accra, Ghana, in December 1958. At this international conference, hosted by Ghanaian president Kwame Nkrumah, Lumumba further solidified his pan-Africanist credentials. Nkrumah was personally impressed by Lumumba's intelligence and ability.

In 1959, the MNC split into the majority MNC-L, led by Lumumba, and the more radical and federalist MNC-K. In late October 1959, Lumumba, as leader of the MNC, was arrested for inciting an anti-colonial riot in Stanleyville during which 30 people were killed. He was sentenced to six months in prison. The trial's start date of 18 January 1960 was the first day of the Congolese Round Table Conference in Brussels, intended to make a plan for the future of the Congo. Despite Lumumba's imprisonment, the MNC won a convincing majority in the December local elections in the Congo. As a result of strong pressure from delegates upset by Lumumba's trial, he was released and allowed to attend the Brussels conference.

== Independence and election as prime minister ==
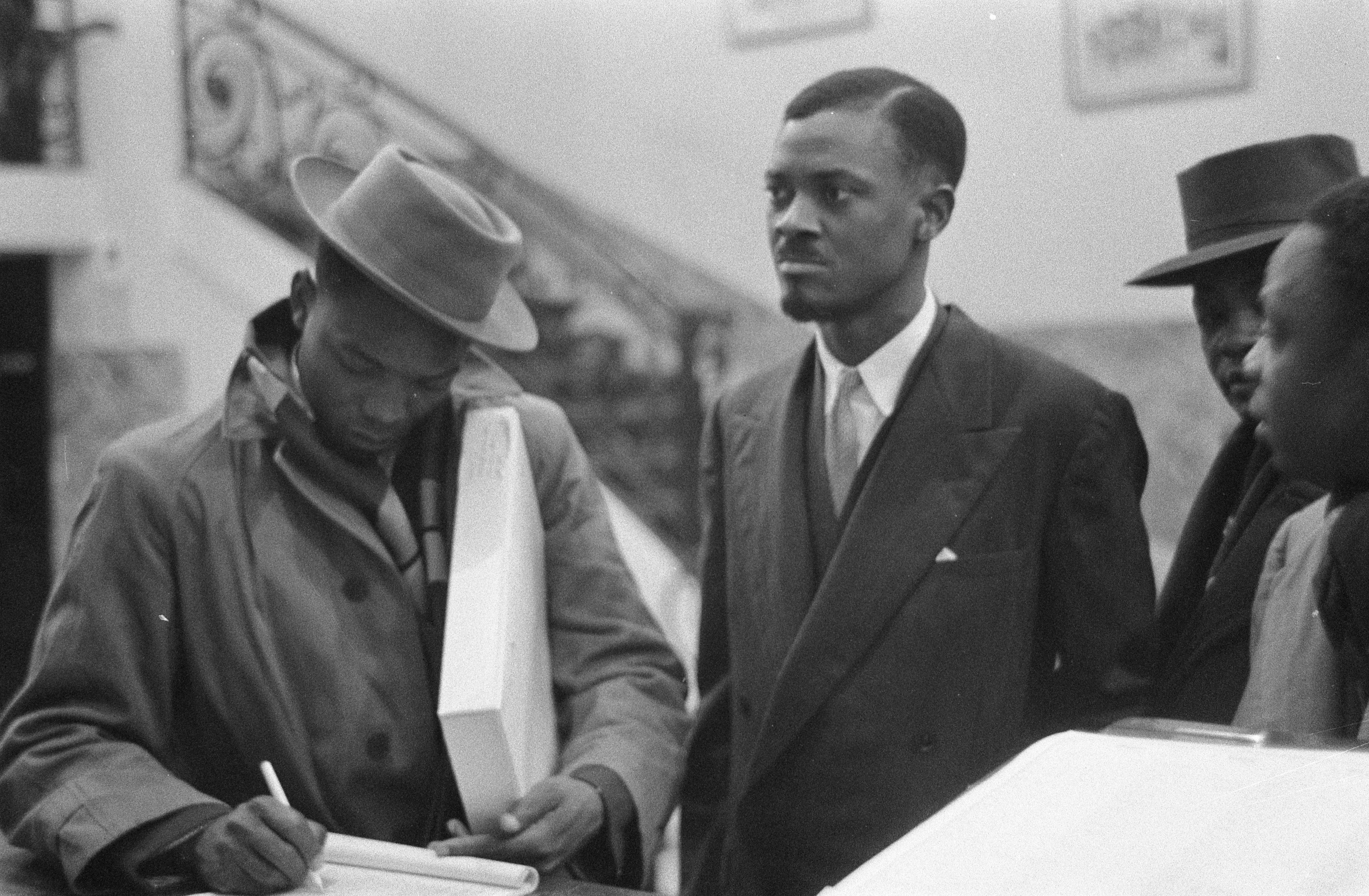
Lumumba pictured in Brussels at the Round Table Conference with other members of the MNC-L delegation, 26 January 1960

The conference culminated on 27 January 1960 with a declaration of Congolese independence. It set 30 June 1960 as the independence date with national elections to be held from 11 to 25 May 1960. The MNC won a plurality in the election. Six weeks before the date of independence, Walter Ganshof van der Meersch was appointed as the Belgian Minister of African Affairs. He lived in Léopoldville, in effect becoming Belgium's de facto resident minister in the Congo, administering it jointly with Governor-general Hendrik Cornelis. He was charged with advising King Baudouin on the selection of a formateur.

On 8 June 1960, Ganshof flew to Brussels to meet with Baudouin. He made three suggestions for formateur: Lumumba, as the winner of the elections; Joseph Kasa-Vubu, the only figure with a reliable national reputation who was associated with the coalescing opposition; or some to-be-determined third individual who could unite the competing blocs. Ganshof returned to the Congo on 12 June 1960. The following day he appointed Lumumba to serve as the delegate (informateur) tasked with investigating the possibility of forming a national unity government that included politicians with a wide range of views, with 16 June 1960 as his deadline.

The same day as Lumumba's appointment, the parliamentary opposition coalition, the Cartel d'Union Nationale, was announced. Though Kasa-Vubu was aligned with their beliefs, he remained distanced from them. The MNC-L was also having trouble securing the allegiances of the PSA, CEREA (Centre de Regroupement Africain), and BALUBAKAT (Association Générale des Baluba du Katanga). Initially, Lumumba was unable to establish contact with members of the cartel. Eventually, several leaders were appointed to meet with him, but their positions remained entrenched. On 16 June 1960, Lumumba reported his difficulties to Ganshof, who extended the deadline and promised to act as an intermediary between the MNC-L leader and the opposition. Once Ganshof had made contact with the cartel leadership, he was impressed by their obstinacy and assurances of a strong anti-Lumumba polity. By evening, Lumumba's mission was showing even less chance of succeeding. Ganshof considered extending the role of informateur to Cyrille Adoula and Kasa-Vubu, but faced increasing pressure from Belgian and moderate Congolese advisers to end Lumumba's assignment.

The following day, on 17 June 1960, Ganshof declared that Lumumba had failed and terminated his mission. Acting on Ganshof's advice, Baudouin then named Kasa-Vubu formateur. Lumumba responded by threatening to form his own government and present it to parliament without official approval. He called a meeting at the OK Bar in Léopoldville, where he announced the creation of a "popular" government with the support of Pierre Mulele of the PSA. Meanwhile, Kasa-Vubu, like Lumumba, was unable to communicate with his political opponents.

He assumed that he would secure the presidency, so he began looking for someone to serve as his prime minister. Most of the candidates he considered were friends who had foreign support similar to his own, including Albert Kalonji, Joseph Iléo, Cyrille Adoula, and Justin Bomboko. Kasa-Vubu was slow to come to a final decision. On 18 June 1960, Kasa-Vubu announced that he had completed his government with all parties except the MNC-L. That afternoon Jason Sendwe, Antoine Gizenga, and Anicet Kashamura announced in the presence of Lumumba that their respective parties were not committed to the government. The next day, on 19 June 1960, Ganshof summoned Kasa-Vubu and Lumumba to a meeting so they could forge a compromise. This failed when Lumumba flatly refused the position of prime minister in a Kasa-Vubu government.

The following day, on 20 June 1960, the two rivals met in the presence of Adoula and diplomats from Israel and Ghana, but no agreement was reached. Most party leaders refused to support a government that did not include Lumumba. The decision to make Kasa-Vubu the formateur was a catalyst that rallied the PSA, CEREA, and BALUBAKAT to Lumumba, making it unlikely that Kasa-Vubu could form a government that would survive a vote of confidence. When the chamber met, on 21 June 1960, to select its officers, Joseph Kasongo of the MNC-L was elected president with 74 votes (a majority), while the two vice presidencies were secured by the PSA and CEREA candidates, both of whom had the support of Lumumba. With time running out before independence, Baudouin took new advice from Ganshof and appointed Lumumba as formateur.

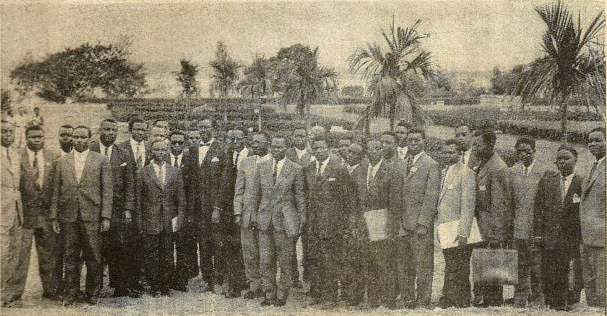
Lumumba (left centre) poses with his government outside the Palais de la Nation immediately following its investiture.

Once it was apparent that Lumumba's bloc controlled parliament, several members of the opposition became eager to negotiate for a coalition government in order to share power. By 22 June 1960, Lumumba had a government list, but negotiations continued with Jean Bolikango, Albert Delvaux, and Kasa-Vubu. Lumumba reportedly offered the Alliance of Bakongo (ABAKO) the ministerial positions for foreign affairs and middle classes, but Kasa-Vubu instead demanded the ministry of finance, a minister of state, the secretary of state for the interior, and a written pledge of support from the MNC-L and its allies for his presidential candidacy. Kalonji was presented with the agriculture portfolio by Lumumba, which he rejected, although he was suitable due to his experience as an agricultural engineer. Adoula was also offered a ministerial position, but refused to accept it.

By the morning of 23 June 1960, the government was, in the words of Lumumba, "practically formed". At noon, he made a counteroffer to Kasa-Vubu, who instead responded with a letter demanding the creation of a seventh province for the Bakongo. Lumumba refused to comply and instead pledged to support Jean Bolikango in his bid for the presidency. At 14:45, Lumumba presented his proposed government before the press. Neither the ABAKO nor the MNC-Kalonji (MNC-K) were represented among the ministers, and the only PSA members were from Gizenga's wing of the party. The Bakongo of Léopoldville were deeply upset by their exclusion from Lumumba's cabinet. They subsequently demanded the removal of the PSA-dominated provincial government and called for a general strike to begin the following morning. At 16:00, Lumumba and Kasa-Vubu resumed negotiations. Kasa-Vubu eventually agreed to Lumumba's earlier offer, though Lumumba informed him that he could not give him a guarantee of support in his presidential candidacy.

The resulting 37-strong Lumumba government was very diverse, with its members coming from different classes, different tribes, and holding varied political beliefs. Though many had questionable loyalty to Lumumba, most did not openly contradict him out of political considerations or fear of reprisal. At 22:40 on 23 June 1960, the Chamber of Deputies convened in the Palais de la Nation to vote on Lumumba's government. After Kasongo opened the session, Lumumba delivered his main speech, promising to maintain national unity, abide by the will of the people, and pursue a neutralist foreign policy. It was warmly received by most deputies and observers.

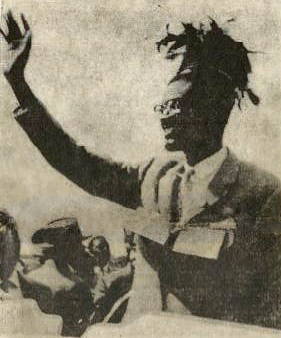
Lumumba waving to supporters, c. 1960

The chamber proceeded to engage in a heated debate. Though the government contained members from parties that held 120 of the 137 seats, reaching a majority was not a straightforward task. While several leaders of the opposition had been involved in the formative negotiations, their parties as a whole had not been consulted. Furthermore, some individuals were upset that they had not been included in the government and sought to personally prevent its investiture. In the subsequent arguments, multiple deputies expressed dissatisfaction at the lack of representation of their respective provinces and/or parties, with several threatening secession. Among them was Kalonji, who said he would encourage people of Kasaï to refrain from participating in the central government and form their own autonomous state. One Katangese deputy objected to the same person being appointed as premier and as head of the defence portfolio.

When a vote was finally taken, only 80 of the 137 members of the chamber were present. Of these, 74 voted in favour of the government, five against, and one abstained. The 57 absences were almost all voluntary. Though the government had earned just as many votes as when Kasongo won the presidency of the chamber, the support was not congruent; members of Cléophas Kamitatu's wing of the PSA had voted against the government while a few members of the PNP, PUNA, and ABAKO voted in favour of it. Overall, the vote was a disappointment for the MNC-L coalition.

The session was adjourned at 02:05 on 24 June 1960. The Senate convened that day to vote on the government. There was another heated debate, in which Iléo and Adoula expressed their strong dissatisfaction with its composition. Confederation of Tribal Associations of Katanga (CONAKAT) members abstained from voting. When arguments concluded, a decisive vote of approval was taken on the government: 60 voted in favour, 12 against, while eight abstained. All dissident arguments for alternative cabinets, particularly Kalonji's demand for a new administration, were rendered impotent, and the Lumumba government was officially invested. With the institution of a broad coalition, the parliamentary opposition was officially reduced to only the MNC-K and some individuals.

At the onset of his premiership, Lumumba had two main goals: to ensure that independence would bring a legitimate improvement in the quality of life for the Congolese and to unify the country as a centralised state by eliminating tribalism and regionalism. He was worried that opposition to his government would appear rapidly and would have to be managed quickly and decisively.

To achieve the first aim, Lumumba believed that a comprehensive "Africanisation" of the administration, in spite of its risks, would be necessary. The Belgians were opposed to such an idea, as it would create inefficiency in the Congo's bureaucracy and lead to a mass exodus of unemployed civil servants to Belgium, whom they would be unable to absorb into the government there. It was too late for Lumumba to enact Africanisation before independence. Seeking another gesture that might excite the Congolese people, Lumumba proposed to the Belgian government a reduction in sentences for all prisoners and an amnesty for those serving a term of three years or less. Ganshof feared that such an action would jeopardise law and order, and he evaded taking any action until it was too late to fulfill the request. Lumumba's opinion of the Belgians was soured by this affair, which contributed to his fear that independence would not appear "real" to the average Congolese.

In seeking to eliminate tribalism and regionalism in the Congo, Lumumba was deeply inspired by the personality and undertakings of Kwame Nkrumah and by Ghanaian ideas of the leadership necessary in post-colonial Africa. He worked to seek such changes through the MNC. Lumumba intended to combine it with its parliamentary allies—CEREA, the PSA, and possibly BALUBAKAT—to form one national party, and to build a following in each province. He hoped it would absorb other parties and become a unifying force for the country.

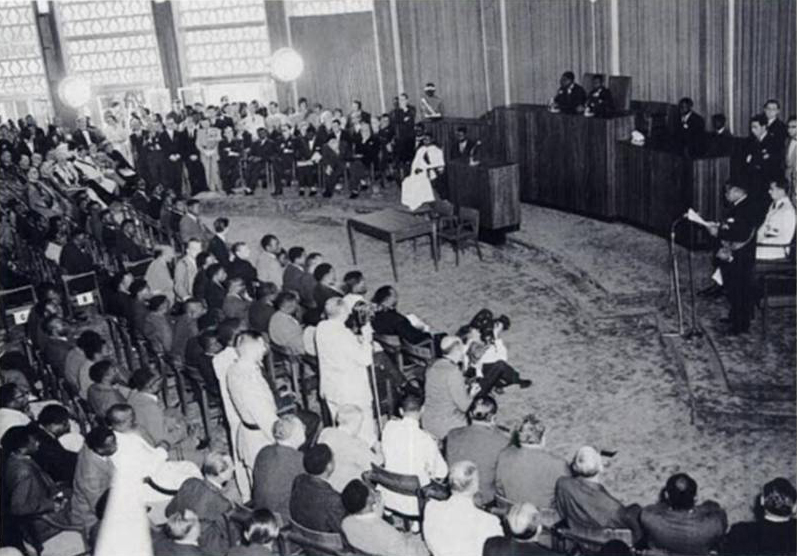
The independence ceremony for the Congo, held on 30 June 1960, at which Lumumba delivered his independence speech

Independence Day was celebrated on 30 June 1960 in a ceremony attended by many dignitaries, including King Baudouin of Belgium and the foreign press. Baudouin's speech praised developments under colonialism, his reference to the "genius" of his great-granduncle Leopold II of Belgium, glossing over atrocities committed during his reign over the Congo Free State. The King continued, "Don't compromise the future with hasty reforms, and don't replace the structures that Belgium hands over to you until you are sure you can do better. Don't be afraid to come to us. We will remain by your side, give you advice."

Lumumba, who had not been scheduled to speak, delivered an impromptu speech that reminded the audience that the independence of the Congo had not been granted magnanimously by Belgium:

For this independence of the Congo, although being proclaimed today by agreement with Belgium, an amicable country, with which we are on equal terms, no Congolese worthy of the name will ever be able to forget that it was by fighting that it has been won, a day-to-day fight, an ardent and idealistic fight, a fight in which we were spared neither privation nor suffering, and for which we gave our strength and our blood. We are proud of this struggle, of tears, of fire, and of blood, to the depths of our being, for it was a noble and just struggle, and indispensable to put an end to the humiliating slavery which was imposed upon us by force.

Most European journalists were shocked by the stridency of Lumumba's speech. The Western media criticised him. Time magazine characterised his speech as a "vicious attack".

== Prime minister ==
=== Independence ===
Every morning at seven o'clock he sat at the huge desk, embellished with the forgotten coat of arms of colonial Belgium; a golden lion in a blue shield. There the Premier first received his immediate assistants, set up the schedule for the day, went over correspondence, which he answered. Without a stop until evening he was receiving salesmen, petitioners, donors, experts, businessmen, and diplomats, the most variegated crowd that ever walked on the market ... everybody wanted to deal exclusively with Lumumba.

— Prime Minister's Press Secretary Serge Michel

Independence Day and the three days that followed it were declared a national holiday. The Congolese were preoccupied by the festivities, which were conducted in relative peace. Meanwhile, Lumumba's office was overtaken by a flurry of activity. A diverse group of individuals, Congolese and European, some friends and relatives, hurried about their work. Some undertook specific missions on his behalf, sometimes without direct permission. Numerous Congolese citizens showed up at the office at whim for various reasons. Lumumba, for his part, was mostly preoccupied with a lengthy itinerary of receptions and ceremonies. On 3 July Lumumba declared a general amnesty for prisoners, but it was never implemented. The following morning he convened the Council of Ministers to discuss the unrest among the troops of the Force Publique.

Many soldiers hoped that independence would result in immediate promotions and material gains, but were disappointed by Lumumba's slow pace of reform. The rank-and-file felt that the Congolese political class—particularly ministers in the new government—were enriching themselves while failing to improve the troops' situation. Many of the soldiers were also fatigued from maintaining order during the elections and participating in independence celebrations. The ministers decided to establish four committees to study, respectively, the reorganisation of the administration, the judiciary, and the army, and the enactment of a new statute for state employees. All were to devote special attention to ending racial discrimination. Parliament assembled for the first time since independence and took its first official legislative action by voting to increase the salaries of its members to FC 500,000. Lumumba, fearing the repercussions the raise would have on the budget, was among the few to object, dubbing it a "ruinous folly".

=== Outbreak of the Congo Crisis ===
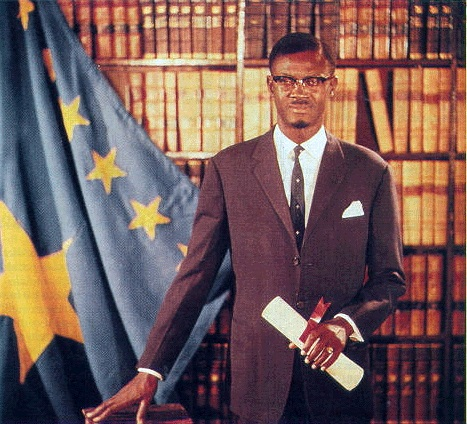
Official portrait of Lumumba as prime minister of the Republic of the Congo, 1960

On the morning of 5 July 1960, General Émile Janssens, commander of the Force Publique, in response to increasing excitement among the Congolese ranks, summoned all troops on duty at Camp Léopold II. He demanded that the army maintain its discipline and wrote "before independence = after independence" on a blackboard for emphasis. That evening the Congolese sacked the canteen in protest of Janssens. He alerted the reserve garrison of Camp Hardy, 95 miles away in Thysville. The officers tried to organise a convoy to send to Camp Léopold II to restore order, but the men mutinied and seized the armoury. The crisis which followed came to dominate the tenure of the Lumumba government. The next day Lumumba dismissed Janssens and promoted all Congolese soldiers one grade, but mutinies spread out into the Lower Congo.

Although the trouble was highly localised, the country seemed to be overrun by gangs of soldiers and looters. The media reported that Europeans were fleeing the country. In response, Lumumba announced over the radio, "Thoroughgoing reforms are planned in all sectors. My government will make every possible effort to see that our country has a different face in a few months, a few weeks." In spite of government efforts, the mutinies continued. Mutineers in Leopoldville and Thysville surrendered only upon the personal intervention of Lumumba and President Kasa-Vubu.

On 8 July, Lumumba renamed the Force Publique as the "Armée Nationale Congolaise" (ANC). He Africanised the force by appointing Sergeant Major Victor Lundula as general and commander-in-chief, and chose junior minister and former soldier Joseph Mobutu as colonel and Army chief of staff. These promotions were made in spite of Lundula's inexperience and rumours about Mobutu's ties to Belgian and US intelligence services. All European officers in the army were replaced with Africans, with a few retained as advisers. By the next day, the mutinies had spread throughout the entire country. Five Europeans, including the Italian vice-consul, were ambushed and killed by machine gun fire in Élisabethville, and nearly the entire European population of Luluabourg barricaded itself in an office building for safety. An estimated two dozen Europeans were murdered in the mutiny. Lumumba and Kasa-Vubu embarked on a tour across the country to promote peace and appoint new army commanders.

Belgium intervened on 10 July, dispatching 6,000 troops to the Congo, ostensibly to protect its citizens from the violence. Most Europeans went to Katanga Province, which possessed much of the Congo's natural resources. Though personally angered, Lumumba condoned the action on 11 July, provided that the Belgian forces acted only to protect their citizens, followed the direction of the Congolese armed forces, and ceased their activities once order was restored. The same day the Belgian Navy bombarded Matadi after it had evacuated its citizens, killing 19 Congolese civilians. This greatly inflamed tensions, leading to renewed Congolese attacks on Europeans. Shortly thereafter Belgian forces moved to occupy cities throughout the country, including the capital, where they clashed with Congolese soldiers. On the whole, the Belgian intervention made the situation worse for the armed forces.

The State of Katanga declared independence under regional premier Moïse Tshombe on 11 July, with support from the Belgian government and mining companies such as Union Minière. Lumumba and Kasa-Vubu were denied use of Élisabethville's airstrip the following day and returned to the capital, only to be accosted by fleeing Belgians. They sent a protest of the Belgian deployment to the United Nations, requesting that they withdraw and be replaced by an international peacekeeping force. The UN Security Council passed United Nations Security Council Resolution 143, calling for the immediate removal of Belgian forces and establishment of the United Nations Operation in the Congo (ONUC). Despite the arrival of UN troops, unrest continued. Lumumba requested UN troops to suppress the rebellion in Katanga, but the UN forces were not authorised to do so under their mandate. On 14 July Lumumba and Kasa-Vubu broke off diplomatic relations with Belgium. Frustrated at dealing with the West, they sent a telegram to Soviet Premier Nikita Khrushchev, requesting that he closely monitor the situation in the Congo.

=== Visit to the United States ===
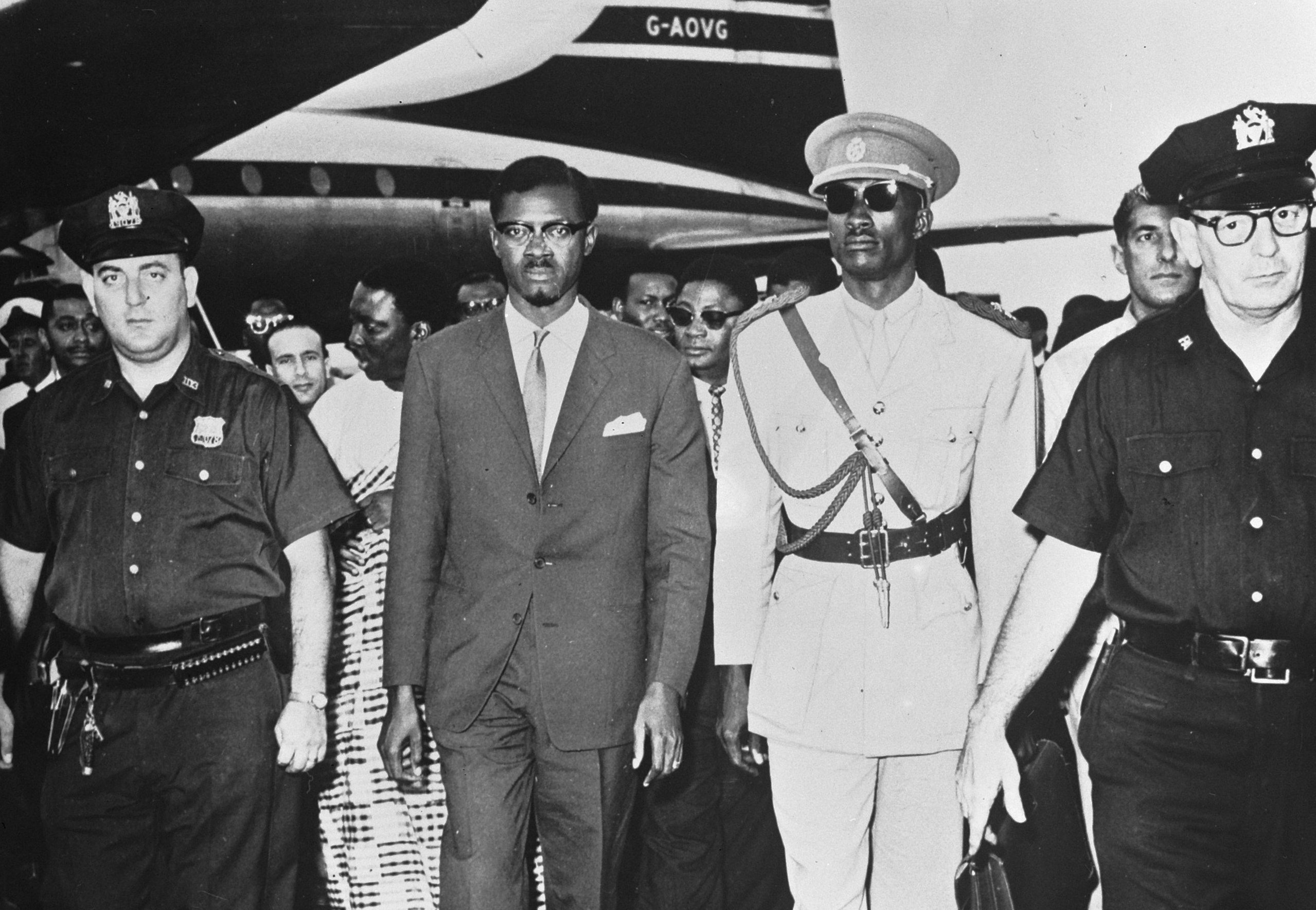
Lumumba arriving in New York City, 24 July 1960

Lumumba decided to travel to New York City in order to personally express the position of his government to the United Nations. Shortly before his departure, he announced that he had signed an economic agreement with a US businessman who had created the Congo International Management Corporation (CIMCO). According to the contract (which had yet to be ratified by parliament), CIMCO was to form a development corporation to invest in and manage certain sectors of the economy. (Note: Kanza later said, "[Lumumba] didn't care ... as long as an American presented this contract. People like us tried to tell him not to sign. He signed and in his mind it was something very good for the Congo.") He also declared his approval of the second security council resolution, adding that "[Soviet] aid was no longer necessary" and announced his intention to seek technical assistance from the United States. On 22 July, Lumumba left the Congo for New York City. (Note: When Lumumba left the Congo Parliament went into recess. Upon his return, he recommended that the body remain in recess for three months so that its members could go on study tours. Parliament did not reconvene until September.) He and his entourage reached the United States two days later after brief stops in Accra and London. There they rendezvoused with his UN delegation at the Barclay Hotel to prepare for meetings with UN officials. Lumumba was focused on discussing the withdrawal of Belgian troops and various options for technical assistance with Dag Hammarskjöld.

African diplomats were keen that the meetings would be successful; they convinced Lumumba to wait until the Congo was more stable before reaching any more major economic agreements (such as the CIMCO arrangement). Lumumba saw Hammarskjöld and other staff of the UN Secretariat over three days on 24, 25, and 26 July. Though Lumumba and Hammarskjöld were restrained towards one another, their discussions went smoothly. In a press conference, Lumumba reaffirmed his government's commitment to "positive neutralism".

On 27 July, Lumumba went to Washington, D.C. to meet with the US Secretary of State and appeal for financial and technical assistance. The US government informed Lumumba that it would offer aid only through the UN. The following day he received a telegram from Gizenga detailing a clash at Kolwezi between Belgian and Congolese forces. Lumumba felt that the UN was hampering his attempts to expel the Belgian troops and defeat the Katangan rebels. On 29 July, Lumumba went to Ottawa, the capital of Canada, to request help. The Canadians rebuffed a request for technicians and said that they would channel their assistance through the UN. Frustrated, Lumumba met with the Soviet ambassador in Ottawa and discussed a donation of military equipment. When he returned to New York the following evening, he was restrained towards the UN. The United States government's attitude had become more negative, due to reports of the rapes and violence committed by ANC soldiers, and scrutiny from Belgium. The latter was chagrined that Lumumba had received a high-level reception in Washington. The Belgian government regarded Lumumba as communist, anti-white, and anti-Western. Given their experiences in the Congo, many other Western governments agreed with the Belgian view.

Frustrated with the UN's apparent inaction towards Katanga as he departed the US, Lumumba decided to delay his return to the Congo. He visited several African states. This was apparently done to put pressure on Hammarskjöld and, failing that, to seek guarantees of bilateral military support to suppress Katanga. Between 2 and 8 August, Lumumba toured Tunisia, Morocco, Guinea, Ghana, Liberia, and Togo. He was well received in each country and issued joint communiques with their respective heads of state. Guinea and Ghana pledged independent military support, while the others expressed their desire to work through the United Nations to resolve the Katangan secession. In Ghana, Lumumba signed a secret agreement with President Nkrumah providing for a "Union of African States". Centred in Léopoldville, it was to be a federation with a republican government. They agreed to hold a summit of African states in Léopoldville between 25 and 30 August to further discuss the issue. Lumumba returned to the Congo, apparently confident that he could now depend upon African military assistance. He also believed that he could procure African bilateral technical aid, which placed him at odds with Hammarskjöld's goal of funnelling support through ONUC. Lumumba and some ministers were wary of the UN option, as it would supply them with functionaries who would not be directly under their authority.

=== Attempts at re-consolidation ===
Map of the Congo in 1961, with South Kasai highlighted in red, bordered to the south by the State of Katanga

The government has declared a state of emergency throughout the whole country ... Those who confuse subversive maneuvers with freedom, obstruction with democratic opposition, or their personal interest with that of the nation will soon be judged by the people. Those who are paid today by the enemies of freedom for the purpose of maintaining sedition movements across the country and thereby disturbing the social peace will be punished with the utmost energy ...

— Lumumba's statement to the press, 10 August 1960 (translated from French)

On 9 August, Lumumba proclaimed a state of emergency throughout the Congo. (Note: According to Govender, "Lumumba had always been reluctant to declare a state of emergency, but with the intensification of hostile acts against his regime by Congolese plotters and their Western friends, he felt that a state of emergency would help his poorly equipped security forces and administration to act more effectively against the trouble-makers.") He subsequently issued several orders in an attempt to reassert his dominance on the political scene. The first outlawed the formation of associations without government sanction. A second asserted the government's right to ban publications that produced material likely to bring the administration into disrepute. On 11 August the Courrier d'Afrique printed an editorial which declared that the Congolese did not want to fall "under a second kind of slavery". The editor was summarily arrested and four days later publication of the daily ceased. Shortly afterward, the government shut down the Belga and Agence France-Presse wire services. The press restrictions garnered a wave of harsh criticism from the Belgian media.

Lumumba decreed the nationalisation of local Belga offices, creating the Agence Congolaise de Presse, as a means of eliminating what he considered a centre of biased reporting, as well as creating a service through which the government's platform could be more easily communicated to the public. (Note: Govender wrote that except for the Belga case, "Lumumba took no steps against [foreign correspondents]. He allowed them complete freedom of movement and the right to express their opinions.") Another order stipulated that official approval had to be obtained six days in advance of public gatherings. On 16 August Lumumba announced the installation of a régime militaire spécial for the duration of six months.

Throughout August, Lumumba increasingly withdrew from his full cabinet and instead consulted with officials and ministers he trusted, such as Maurice Mpolo, Joseph Mbuyi, Kashamura, Gizenga, and Antoine Kiwewa. Lumumba's office was in disarray, and few members of his staff did any work. His chef de cabinet, Damien Kandolo, was often absent and acted as a spy on behalf of the Belgian government. Lumumba was constantly being delivered rumours from informants and the Sûreté, encouraging him to grow deeply suspicious of others. In an attempt to keep him informed, Serge Michel, his press secretary, enlisted the assistance of three Belgian telex operators, who supplied him with copies of all outgoing journalistic dispatches.

Lumumba used Congolese troops in August to attempt to put down a secessionist rebellion in South Kasai, which was home to strategic rail links necessary for a campaign against rebels in Katanga. The operation had successes but devolved into ethnic violence. The army was involved in massacres of Luba civilians. Amid international approbation, the army was withdrawn in September, and its secession was not quashed until the following year.

The people and politicians of South Kasai held Lumumba personally responsible for the actions of the army. Kasa-Vubu publicly announced that only a federalist government could bring peace and stability to the Congo. This broke his tenuous political alliance with Lumumba and tilted the political favour in the country away from Lumumba's unitary state. Ethnic tensions rose against him (especially around Leopoldville), and the Catholic Church, still powerful in the country, openly criticised his government. Even with South Kasai subdued, the Congo lacked the military force needed to retake Katanga. Lumumba held an African conference in Leopoldville from 25 to 31 August, but no foreign heads of state appeared and no country pledged military support. Lumumba demanded once again that UN peacekeeping soldiers assist in suppressing the revolt, threatening to bring in Soviet troops if they refused. The UN subsequently denied Lumumba the use of its forces. The possibility of a direct Soviet intervention was thought increasingly likely.

== Dismissal ==
=== Kasa-Vubu's revocation order ===
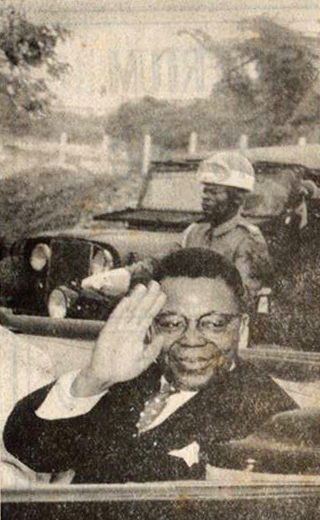
President Joseph Kasa-Vubu, c. 1960

President Kasa-Vubu began fearing a Lumumbist coup d'état would take place. (Note: There is sufficient evidence to suggest that Lumumba was growing impatient with the Parliamentary system and was seeking alternatives to achieve his agenda. At the same time, he did not begin to plan for a coup until he grew suspicious of his opponents' intentions to depose him.) On the evening of 5 September, Kasa-Vubu announced over radio that he had dismissed Lumumba and six of his ministers from the government for the massacres in South Kasai and for involving the Soviets in the Congo. Upon hearing the broadcast, Lumumba went to the national radio station, which was under UN guard. Though they had been ordered to bar Lumumba's entry, the UN troops allowed the prime minister in, as they had no specific instructions to use force against him. Lumumba denounced his dismissal over the radio as illegitimate, and in turn labelled Kasa-Vubu a traitor and declared him deposed. Kasa-Vubu had not declared the approval of any responsible ministers of his decision, making his action legally invalid. (Note: Article 22 of the Loi Fondamentale reads, "The President names and revokes the Prime Minister." There was no elaboration on the point, and nowhere else in the document were the nature or limits of the power explained, including whether or not parliamentary approval was necessary. However, it was stipulated that any action undertaken by the President had to be countersigned by a minister responsible to Parliament. This provision was interpreted to extend to Kasa-Vubu's order.) Lumumba noted this in a letter to Hammarskjöld and a radio broadcast at 05:30 on 6 September. Later that day Kasa-Vubu managed to secure the countersignatures to his order of Albert Delvaux, Minister Resident in Belgium, and Justin Marie Bomboko, Minister of Foreign Affairs. With them, he announced his dismissal of Lumumba and six other ministers at 16:00 over Brazzaville radio.

Lumumba and the ministers who remained loyal to him ordered the arrest of Delvaux and Bomboko for countersigning the dismissal order. Bomboko sought refuge in the presidential palace (which was guarded by UN peacekeepers). Early in the morning of 7 September, Delvaux was detained and confined in the Prime Minister's residence. (Note: Lumumba denied having authorised the arrests and issued an apology before the Chamber.)

Meanwhile, the Chamber of Deputies convened to discuss Kasa-Vubu's dismissal order and hear Lumumba's reply. Delvaux made an unexpected appearance and took to the dais to denounce his arrest and declare his resignation from the government. He was enthusiastically applauded by the opposition.

Lumumba then delivered his speech. Instead of directly attacking Kasa-Vubu ad hominem, Lumumba accused obstructionist politicians and ABAKO of using the presidency as a front for disguising their activities. He noted that Kasa-Vubu had never before offered any criticism of the government and portrayed their relationship as one of cooperation. He lambasted Delvaux and Minister of Finance Pascal Nkayi for their role in the UN Geneva negotiations and for their failure to consult the rest of the government. Lumumba followed his arguments with an analysis of the Loi Fondemental and finished by asking Parliament to assemble a "commission of sages" to examine the Congo's troubles.

The Chamber, at the suggestion of its presiding officer, voted to annul both Kasa-Vubu's and Lumumba's declarations of dismissal, 60 to 19. The following day Lumumba delivered a similar speech before the Senate, which subsequently delivered the government a vote of confidence, 49 to zero with seven abstentions. (Note: According to de Witte, the vote was tallied as 41 to two with six abstentions.) According to Article 51, Parliament was granted the "exclusive privilege" to interpret the constitution. In cases of doubt and controversy, the Congolese were originally supposed to appeal constitutional questions to the Belgian Conseil d'État. With the rupture of relations in July this was no longer possible, so no authoritative interpretation or mediation was available to bring a legal resolution to the dispute. (Note: De Witte described Kasa-Vubu's dismissal order as "clearly not constitutional" and labelled the invoked Article 22 as a "totally obsolete" provision which could only be resolved "by a law or revision of the constitution, passed by a parliament with confidence in Lumumba." Evan Luard wrote, "Of Kasa-Vubu's move [...] it can reasonably be said that by the way he used his power without referring to Parliament amounted to an abuse of the constitution". Gerard and Kuklick noted that in August 1960 Baudouin, operating within the confines of the extremely similar Belgian Constitution, had asked Prime Minister Eyskens to resign, but that Eyskens, having a solid parliamentary majority, refused and retained his office.) Numerous African diplomats and newly appointed ONUC head Rajeshwar Dayal attempted to get the president and prime minister to reconcile their differences, but failed. On 13 September, the Parliament held a joint session between the Chamber of Deputies and the Senate. Though several members short of a quorum, they voted to grant Lumumba emergency powers.

Mobutu at press conference announcing coup on September 14, 1960

=== Mobutu's coup ===
On 14 September, Mobutu announced over the radio that he was launching a "peaceful revolution" to break the political impasse and therefore neutralising the President, Lumumba's and Iléo's respective governments, and Parliament until 31 December. He stated that "technicians" would run the administration while the politicians sorted out their differences. In a subsequent press conference, he clarified that Congolese university graduates would be asked to form a government, and further declared that all Eastern Bloc countries should close their embassies. Lumumba was surprised by the coup (Note: Various sources state Mobutu's action was encouraged and supported by Belgium and the United States.) and that evening he travelled to Camp Leopold II in search of Mobutu to try and change his mind. He spent the night there but was attacked in the morning by Luba soldiers, who blamed him for the atrocities in South Kasaï. A Ghanaian ONUC contingent managed to extricate him, but his briefcase was left behind. Some of his political opponents recovered it and published documents it supposedly contained, including letters from Nkrumah, appeals for support addressed to the Soviet Union and the People's Republic of China, a memorandum dated 16 September declaring the presence of Soviet troops within one week, and a letter dated 15 September from Lumumba to the provincial presidents (Tshombe excepted) entitled "Measures to be applied during the first stages of the dictatorship". Some of these papers were genuine, while others, especially the memorandum and the letter to the provincial presidents, were almost certainly forgeries.

Despite the coup, African diplomats still worked towards a reconciliation between Lumumba and Kasa-Vubu. According to the Ghanaians, a verbal agreement of principle concerning closer co-operation between the Head of State and the government was put into writing. Lumumba signed it, but Kasa-Vubu suddenly refused to reciprocate. The Ghanaians suspected that Belgium and the United States were responsible. Kasa-Vubu was eager to re-integrate Katanga back into the Congo through negotiation, and Tshombe had declared that he would not participate in any discussions with a government that included the "communist" Lumumba.

After consultation with Kasa-Vubu and Lumumba, Mobutu announced that he would summon a round table conference to discuss the political future of the Congo. His attempts to follow through were disrupted by Lumumba who, from his official residence, was acting as though he still held the premiership. He continued to hold meetings with members of his government, senators, deputies, and political supporters, and to issue public statements. On numerous occasions he left his residence to tour the restaurants of the capital, maintaining that he still held power. Frustrated by the way he was being treated by Lumumba and facing intense political pressure, by the end of the month Mobutu was no longer encouraging reconciliation; he had aligned with Kasa-Vubu. He ordered ANC units to surround Lumumba's residence, but a cordon of UN peacekeepers prevented them from making an arrest. Lumumba was confined to his home. On 7 October, Lumumba announced the formation of a new government that included Bolikango and Kalonji, but he later proposed that the UN supervise a national referendum that would settle the split in the government.

On 24 November, the UN voted to recognise Mobutu's new delegates to the General Assembly, disregarding Lumumba's original appointees. Lumumba resolved to join Deputy Prime Minister Antoine Gizenga in Stanleyville and lead a campaign to regain power. On 27 November, he left the capital in a convoy of nine cars with Rémy Mwamba, Pierre Mulele, his wife Pauline, and his youngest child. Instead of heading with all haste to the Orientale Province border—where soldiers loyal to Gizenga were waiting to receive him—Lumumba delayed by touring villages and making conversation with the locals.

On 1 December, Mobutu's troops caught up with Lumumba's party as it crossed the Sankuru River in Lodi. Lumumba and his advisers made it to the far side, but his wife and child were behind them and were captured on the far bank. Fearing for their safety, Lumumba took the ferry back, against the advice of Mwamba and Mulele, who both, fearing they would never see him again, bid him farewell.

Mobutu's men arrested him. He was moved to Port Francqui the next day and flown back to Léopoldville. Mobutu announced Lumumba would be tried for inciting the army to rebellion and other crimes.

=== UN response ===
Hammarskjöld made an appeal to Kasa-Vubu asking that Lumumba be treated according to due process. The Soviet Union denounced Hammarskjöld and the First World as responsible for Lumumba's arrest and demanded his release.

The United Nations Security Council was called into session on 7 December 1960 to consider Soviet demands that the UN seek Lumumba's immediate release, the immediate restoration of Lumumba as head of the Congo government, the disarmament of the forces of Mobutu, and the immediate evacuation of Belgians from the Congo. The Soviets also requested the immediate resignation of Hammarskjöld, the arrests of Mobutu and Tshombe, and the withdrawal of UN peacekeeping forces. Hammarskjöld, answering Soviet criticism of his Congo operations, said that if the UN forces were withdrawn from the Congo, "I fear everything will crumble."

The threat to the UN cause was intensified by the announcement of the withdrawal of their contingents by Yugoslavia, the United Arab Republic, Ceylon, Indonesia, Morocco, and Guinea. The pro-Lumumba resolution was defeated on 14 December 1960 by a vote of 8–2. On the same day, a Western resolution that would have given Hammarskjöld increased powers to deal with the Congo situation was vetoed by the Soviet Union.

== Final days and assassination ==
Universal Newsreel covering Lumumba's capture and his arrival under detention in Leopoldville on 2 December 1960 before transport to Thysville

Lumumba was sent first on 3 December 1960 to the Thysville military barracks at Camp Hardy, 150 km (about 100 miles) from Léopoldville. He was accompanied by Maurice Mpolo and Joseph Okito, two political associates who had planned to assist him in setting up a new government. They were fed poorly by the prison guards, as per Mobutu's orders. In Lumumba's last documented letter, he wrote to Rajeshwar Dayal, head of the UN in the Congo: "In a word, we are living amid absolutely impossible conditions; moreover, they are against the law."

On the morning of 13 January 1961, discipline at Camp Hardy faltered. Soldiers refused to work unless they were paid; they received a total of 400,000 francs ($8,000) from the Katanga Cabinet. Some supported Lumumba's release, while others thought he was dangerous. Kasa-Vubu, Mobutu, Foreign Minister Justin Marie Bomboko, and Head of Security Services Victor Nendaka Bika personally arrived at the camp and negotiated with the troops. Conflict was avoided, but it became apparent that holding a controversial prisoner in the camp was too great a risk. Harold Charles d'Aspremont Lynden, the last Belgian Minister of the Colonies, ordered that Lumumba, Mpolo, and Okito be taken to the State of Katanga. According to Belgian sociologist and writer Ludo De Witte, this was essentially a death sentence for Lumumba.

Lumumba was forcibly restrained on the flight to Elisabethville on 17 January 1961. On arrival, his associates and he were conducted under arrest to the Brouwez House, where they were brutally beaten and tortured by Katangan officers, while Tshombe and his cabinet decided what to do with him.

Later that night, Lumumba, Mpolo, and Okito were driven to an isolated spot where three firing squads had been assembled that were commanded by Belgian contract officer Julien Gat. The orders to murder Lumumba were given by Katangan leaders. The last stage of the execution was personally undertaken by the Belgian contracts led by Police Commissioner Frans Verscheure. Lumumba, Mpolo, and Okito were put up against a tree and shot one at a time. The execution is thought to have taken place on 17 January 1961, between 21:40 and 21:43 according to a later Belgian parliamentary inquiry. Tshombe, two other ministers, and four Belgian officers under the command of the Katangan authorities were present. The bodies were thrown into a shallow grave.

=== Exhumation ===
The following morning, 18 January, Katangan Interior Minister Godefroid Munongo, panicked by reports that the burial of the three bodies had been observed and wishing to prevent a burial site from being created, ordered Belgian gendarmerie officer Gerard Soete and other members of the execution team including Police commissioner Frans Verscheure to dig up the corpses. The remains were initially moved for reburial to a place near the border with Northern Rhodesia. On the afternoon and evening of 21 January, Soete and his brother dug up Lumumba's corpse a second time, then cut it up with a hacksaw and dissolved it in concentrated sulfuric acid.

=== Announcement of death and reactions ===
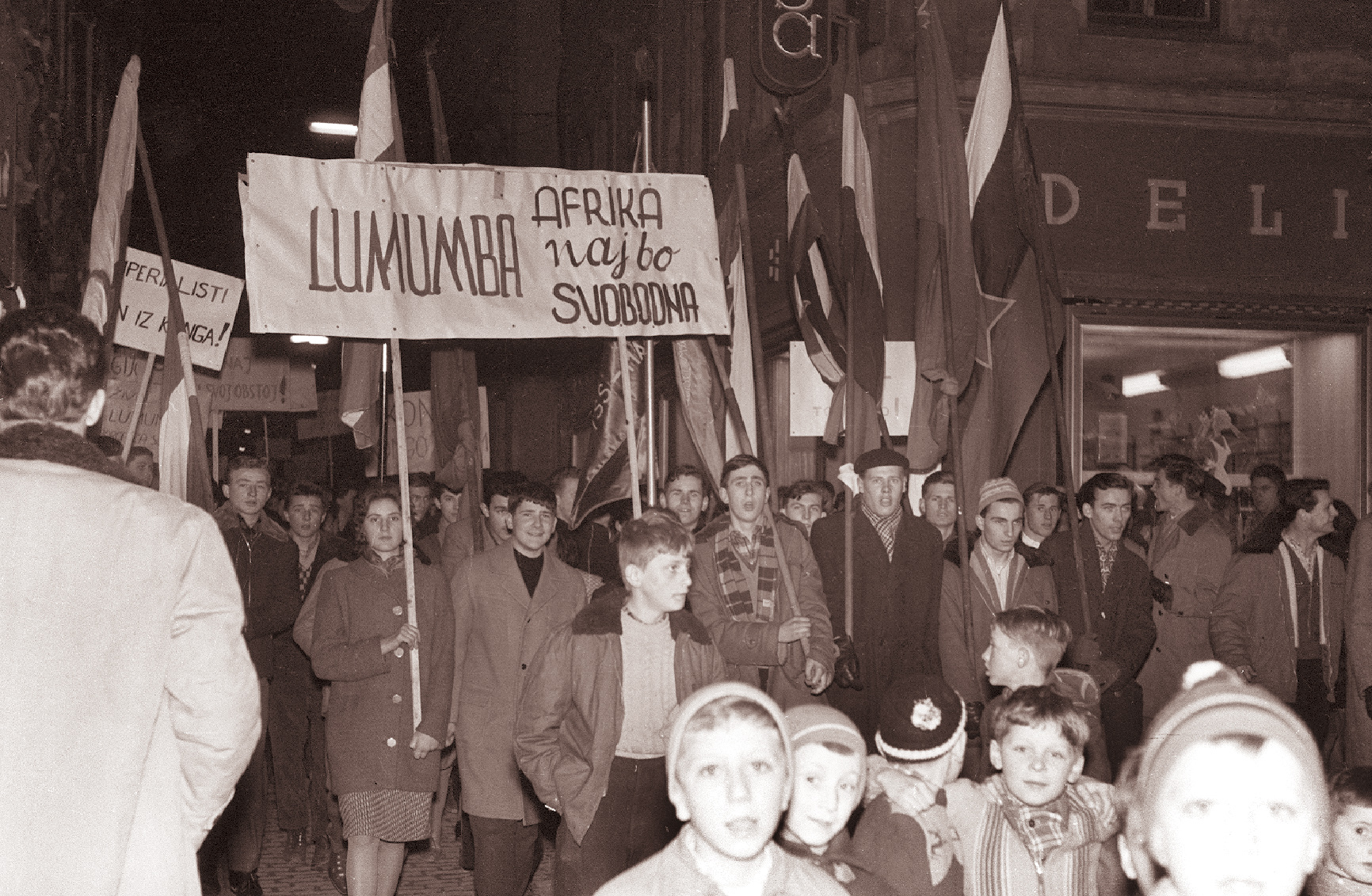
Young protesters in Maribor, Yugoslavia, against the death of Lumumba, 1961

No statement was released until three weeks after Lumumba's killing, despite rumours that Lumumba was dead. Katangan Secretary of State of Information Lucas Samalenge was one of the first people to reveal Lumumba's death, on 18 January. According to De Witte, Samalenge went to the bar Le Relais in Élisabethville and "told everyone willing to listen that Lumumba was dead and that he had kicked his corpse. He went around repeating the story until the police took him away."

On 10 February, the radio announced that Lumumba and two other prisoners had escaped. His death was formally announced over Katangan radio on 13 February: it was alleged that he was killed by enraged villagers three days after escaping from Kolatey prison farm.

Lumumba's assassination sparked protests in at least twenty countries, including Belgium, the United Kingdom, Ghana, China, Venezuela, and the United States.

After the announcement of Lumumba's death, street protests were organised in several European countries; in Belgrade, protesters sacked the Belgian embassy and confronted the police, and in London, a crowd marched from Trafalgar Square to the Belgian embassy, where a letter of protest was delivered and where protesters clashed with police. In New York City, protestors in the spectator's gallery at the United Nations Security Council turned violent and spilled over into the streets.

=== Foreign involvement ===
The Belgians, who had opposed Lumumba throughout independence and facilitated the secession of Katanga, sought Lumumba's removal as early as July 13, 1960 in an offer to support Justin Bomboko, should he stage a coup. In October 1960, Belgian minister d'Aspremont Lynden wrote to Katangan minister Godefroid Munongo that his country desired "the definitive elimination" of Lumumba. The office of King Baudouin corresponded with Katangan premier Moise Tshombe via Tshombe's aide Guy Weber, communicating that the king saw Lumumba as an unwelcome blockage to the restoration of positive relations between Belgium and its former colony. To the king's office, Weber reported on a meeting between Tshombe and Mobutu in which they discussed the neutralization "if possible physically . . ." to be pursued in the new year of 1961. After the mutiny at Camp Hardy in January 1961, D'Aspremont Lynden and Belgian Foreign Minister Pierre Wigny corresponded over how to ensure Lumumba's complete disempowerment, whether by killing him in Thysville or by transferring him to a hostile power in Albert Kalonji's South Kasai or Katanga. They facilitated the transfer to Katanga.

After Lumumba's death, global protests frequently vandalized Belgian embassies and consulates. In 2001, a group of historians appointed by the Belgian parliament concluded that:

It can be stated with certainty that the Belgian government authorities helped to oust Lumumba from power, then opposed any reconciliation with him, and tried to prevent his return to power. They insisted that he be arrested, but not that he be tried. They supported Lumumba's transfer to Katanga, without ruling out, through appropriate measures, the possibility that he might be executed there. (Note: In French: On peut affirmer avec certitude que les instances gouvernementales belges ont aidé à chasser Lumumba du pouvoir, se sont ensuite opposées à toute réconciliation avec ce dernier et ont tenté d’empêcher son retour au pouvoir. Elles ont insisté pour qu’il soit arrêté, mais pas pour qu’il soit jugé. Elles ont appuyé le transfert de Lumumba au Katanga, sans exclure, par des mesures appropriées, la possibilité qu’il y soit mis à mort.)

The United States had previously sought Lumumba's death as well, using covert operations intended to achieve that aim. In September 1960, President Dwight Eisenhower authorized a CIA plan to poison Lumumba, though it was not carried out. The country was more broadly involved in the Congo Crisis, with American operatives and politicians seeking a bulwark against Soviet involvement. The British government also sought Lumumba's neutralization using covert means, believing he posed a serious threat to mining interests, especially in Katanga. In internal discussions, Foreign Office diplomat Howard Smith concluded that killing Lumumba "should solve the problem." In 2013, David Lea said that Daphne Park, who was stationed in the Congo at the time with MI6, had claimed involvement with Lumumba's assassination, though the government itself did not corroboate the claim.

=== Repatriation of his remains ===
The mausoleum of Patrice Lumumba was inaugurated in 2022 in Kinshasa at the place de l'Échangeur.

On 30 June 2020, Lumumba's daughter, Juliana Lumumba, appealed directly in a letter to Philippe, King of the Belgians, the return of "the relics of Patrice Émery Lumumba to the ground of his ancestors", describing her father as "a hero without a grave". The letter stated: "Why, after his terrible murder, have Lumumba's remains been condemned to remain a soul forever wandering, without a grave to shelter his eternal rest?" On 10 September 2020, a Belgian judge ruled that Lumumba's remains – which then consisted of just a single gold-capped tooth (Gerard Soete had lost the other tooth of Lumumba between 1999 and 2020) – must be returned to his family.

In May 2021, Congolese President Félix Tshisekedi announced that there would be a repatriation of the last remains of Lumumba, however, the handover ceremony was delayed because of the COVID-19 pandemic. On 9 June 2022, during a speech in the DRC to the country's parliament, King Philippe reiterated regrets for Belgium's colonial past in its former colony, describing Belgian rule as a "regime ... of unequal relations, unjustifiable in itself, marked by paternalism, discrimination and racism" that "led to violent acts and humiliations".

On 20 June, Lumumba's children received the remains of their father during a ceremony at Egmont Palace in Brussels, where the federal prosecutor formally handed custody to the family. The Belgian Prime Minister, Alexander De Croo, apologised on behalf of the Belgian government for his country's role in Lumumba's assassination: "For my part, I would like to apologise here, in the presence of his family, for the way in which the Belgian government influenced the decision to end the life of the country's first prime minister." "A man was murdered for his political convictions, his words, his ideals", he added. Later the full-sized coffin was brought out in public and draped in the Congolese flag for the Congolese and wider African diaspora of Belgium to pay their respects before the return.

A special mausoleum was built in Kinshasa to house his remains. The government of the Democratic Republic of the Congo declared three days of national mourning. The burial coincided with the 61st anniversary of his famous independence day speech. An investigation by Belgian prosecutors for "war crimes" related to Lumumba's murder is ongoing. His remains were laid to rest 30 June 2022. On 18 November 2024, the mausoleum was vandalised and Lumumba's coffin broken, with the interior ministry saying that his tooth was safe.

== Political ideology ==
Lumumba did not espouse a comprehensive political or economic platform. According to Patricia Goff, Lumumba was the first Congolese to articulate a narrative of the Congo that contradicted traditional Belgian views of colonisation, and he highlighted the suffering of the indigenous population under European rule. Goff writes that Lumumba was alone among his contemporaries in encompassing all Congolese people in his narrative (the others confined their discussions to their respective ethnicities or regions), and he offered a basis for national identity that was predicated upon having survived colonial victimisation, as well as the people's innate dignity, humanity, strength, and unity. Lumumba's ideal of humanism included the values of egalitarianism, social justice, liberty, and the recognition of fundamental rights. He viewed the state as a positive advocate for the public welfare and its intervention in Congolese society as necessary to ensure equality, justice, and social harmony. Scholars associate Lumumba with the intellectual tradition known as "Red Africa", in which African Marxist and revolutionary thinkers positioned him as a martyr of global anti-imperialism and a foundational figure of left-wing African liberation politics.

== Legacy ==
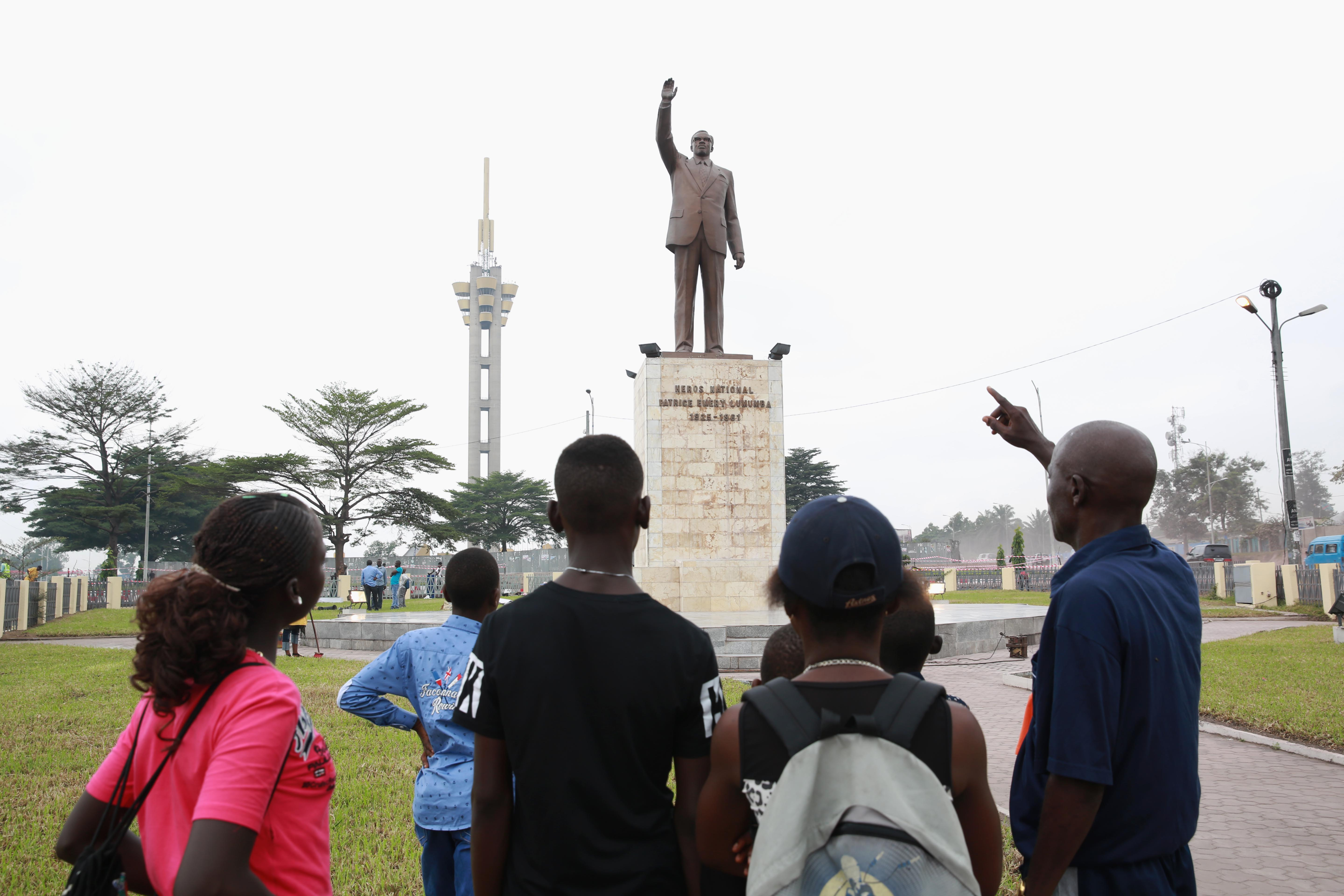
Statue of Lumumba in Kinshasa, erected in January 2002 after the fall of the Mobutu regime

Within Congo, Lumumba's legacy became politically charged: student organizations, church leaders, and nationalist activists invoked his image to contest neocolonial structures and demand political reform.

=== Historiography ===
Full accounts of Lumumba's life and death were printed within weeks of his demise. Beginning in 1961 and continuing for several years thereafter, some biographies of him were published. Most were highly partisan. Several early works on the Congo Crisis also discussed Lumumba at length. In the years after his death, misconceptions of Lumumba persisted among both his supporters and his critics. (Note: Journalist Russell Warren Howe listed multiple popular "illusions" about Lumumba in 1968: "Lumumba was a radical revolutionary (his admirers' view) or a member of a Moscow- and Nkrumah-inspired conspiracy (his critics' image); he had broad national support and an electoral majority (his admirers); he sought to oust Western finance and socialize the economy (his critics); he was more 'African', less 'European' than his rival Kasa-Vubu (his admirers); he is a living force in Congolese politics, the father of Congolese nationalism (his admirers again).") Serious study of him faded over the following decades. Academic discussion of his legacy was largely limited until the later stages of Mobutu's rule in the Congo; Mobutu's opening of the country to multi-party politics beginning in 1990 revived interest in Lumumba's death.

Belgian literature in the decades following the Congo Crisis portrayed him as incompetent, demagogic, aggressive, ungrateful, undiplomatic, and communist. Most Africanists of the 20th century, such as Jean-Claude Willame, viewed Lumumba as an intransigent, unrealistic idealist without any tangible programme who distanced himself from his contemporaries and alienated the Western world with radical anti-colonial rhetoric. They saw him as greatly responsible for the political crisis that resulted in his downfall. A handful of other writers, such as Jean-Paul Sartre, shared the belief that Lumumba's goals were unattainable in 1960 but viewed him as a martyr of Congolese independence at the hands of certain Western interests and the victim of events over which he had little control. According to sociologist De Witte, both of these perspectives overstate the political weaknesses and isolation of Lumumba.

A conventional narrative of Lumumba's premiership and downfall eventually emerged; he was an uncompromising radical who provoked his own murder by angering domestic separatists. Within Belgium, the popular narrative of his death implicated some Belgian individuals, but stressed that they were acting "under orders" of African figures and that the Belgian government was uninvolved. Some Belgian circles peddled the notion that the United States—particularly the Central Intelligence Agency—had arranged the killing.

This narrative was challenged by De Witte's 2001 work, The Assassination of Patrice Lumumba, which said that the Belgian government—with the complicity of the United States, the United Kingdom, and the UN— was responsible for his death. Media discussion of Lumumba, spurred by the release of the book as well as a feature film in 2000, Lumumba, became significantly more positive afterwards. A new narrative subsequently emerged, blaming Western espionage for Lumumba's death, and emphasising the threat his charismatic appeal posed to Western interests. Lumumba's role in the Congolese independence movement is well-documented, and he is typically recognised as its most important and influential leader. (Note: Anthropologist Yolanda Covington-Ward wrote that, though Lumumba was "privileged in the historical literature on nationalism in the Congo", Kasa-Vubu and ABAKO were actually the primary "driving force" behind the independence movement.) His exploits are usually celebrated as the work of him as an individual and not that of a larger movement.

=== Political impact ===
Despite his brief political career and tragic death—or perhaps because of them—Lumumba entered history through the front door: he became both a flag and a symbol. He lived as a free man, and an independent thinker. Everything he wrote, said and did was the product of someone who knew his vocation to be that of a liberator, and he represents for the Congo what Castro does for Cuba, Nasser for Egypt, Nkrumah for Ghana, Mao Tse-tung for China, and Lenin for Russia.

— Thomas Kanza, friend and colleague of Lumumba, 1972

Due to his relatively short career in government, quick removal from power, and controversial death, a consensus has not been reached on Lumumba's political legacy. His downfall was detrimental to African nationalist movements, and he is generally remembered primarily for his assassination.

Numerous American historians have cited his death as a major contributing factor to the radicalisation of the American civil rights movement in the 1960s, and many African American activist organisations and publications used public comment on his death to express their ideology. Popular memory of Lumumba has often discarded his politics and reduced him to a symbol.

Within the Congo, Lumumba is primarily portrayed as a symbol of national unity, while abroad he is usually cast as a pan-Africanist and anti-colonial revolutionary. The ideological legacy of Lumumba is known as Lumumbisme (French for Lumumbism). Rather than a complex doctrine, it is usually framed as a set of fundamental principles consisting of nationalism, pan-Africanism, nonalignment, and social progressivism. Mobutism built off of these principles. Congolese university students—who had up until independence held little respect for Lumumba—embraced Lumumbisme after his death. According to political scientist Georges Nzongola-Ntalaja, Lumumba's "greatest legacy ... for the Congo is the ideal of national unity". Nzongola-Ntalaja further posited that, as a result of Lumumba's high praise of the independence movement and his work to end the Katangese secession, "the people of the Congo are likely to remain steadfast in their defense of national unity and territorial integrity, come hell or high water." Political scientist Ali Mazrui wrote, "It looks as if the memory of Lumumba may contribute more to the 'oneness' of the Congolese than anything Lumumba himself actually did while he was still alive."

Following the suppression of the rebellions of 1964 and 1965, most Lumumbist ideology was confined to isolated groups of intellectuals who faced repression under Mobutu's regime. By 1966 there was little popular devotion to him outside of the political elite. Centres of Lumumba's popularity in his lifetime underwent a gradual decline in fidelity to his person and ideas. According to Africanist Bogumil Jewsiewicki, by 1999 "the only faithful surviving Lumumbist nucleus is located in Sankuru and Maniema, and its loyalty is questionable (more ethnical, regional, and sentimental than ideological and political)." Lumumba's image was unpopular in southern Kasai for years after his death, as many Baluba remained aware of the military campaign he ordered in August 1960 that resulted in violent atrocities against their people.

At least a dozen Congolese political parties have claimed to bear Lumumba's political and spiritual heritage. Despite this, few entities have attempted or succeeded in incorporating his ideas into a comprehensible political program. Most of these parties have enjoyed little electoral support, though Gizenga's Parti Lumumbiste Unifié was represented in the Congolese coalition government formed under President Joseph Kabila in 2006. Aside from student groups, Lumumbist ideals play only a minor role in current Congolese politics. Congolese presidents Mobutu, Laurent-Désiré Kabila, and Joseph Kabila all claimed to inherit Lumumba's legacy and paid tribute to him early on in their tenures.

=== Martyrdom ===
[O]ne thing is clear: while he lived he was essentially a factional hero rather than a national one. But after his death the myth of Lumumba was rapidly nationalized.

— Political scientist Ali Mazrui, 1968

The circumstances of Lumumba's death have led him to often be portrayed as a martyr. While his demise led to an outburst of mass demonstrations abroad and the quick creation of a martyr image internationally, the immediate reaction to his death in the Congo was not as uniform. Tetela, Songye, and Luba-Katanga peoples created folks songs of mourning for him, but these were groups which had been involved in political alliances with him and, at the time, Lumumba was unpopular in large segments of the Congolese populace, particularly in the capital, Bas-Congo, Katanga, and South Kasai. Some of his actions and the portrayal of him as a communist by his detractors had also generated disaffection in the army, civil service, labour unions, and the Catholic Church. Lumumba's reputation as a martyr in the collective memory of the Congolese was only cemented later, partly due to the initiatives of Mobutu.

In Congolese collective memory, it is perceived that Lumumba was killed through Western machinations because he defended the Congo's self-determination. The killing is viewed in the context of the memory as a symbolic moment in which the Congo lost its dignity in the international realm and the ability to determine its future, which has since been controlled by the West. Lumumba's determination to pursue his goals is extrapolated upon the Congolese people as their own; securing the Congo's dignity and self-determination would thus ensure their "redemption" from victimisation by Western powers. Historian David Van Reybrouck wrote, "In no time Lumumba became a martyr of decolonisation ... He owed this status more to the horrible end of his life than to his political successes." Journalist Michela Wrong remarked that "He really did become a hero after his death, in a way that one has to wonder if he would have been such a hero if he had remained and run the country and faced all the problems that running a country as big as Congo would have inevitably brought." Drama scholar Peit Defraeya wrote, "Lumumba as a dead martyr has become a more compelling figure in liberationist discourse than the controversial live politician." Historian Pedro Monaville wrote that "his globally iconic status was not commensurate with his more complex legacy in [the] Congo." Cooptation of Lumumba's legacy by Congolese presidents and state media has generated doubts in the Congolese public about his reputation.

=== Commemoration and official tributes ===
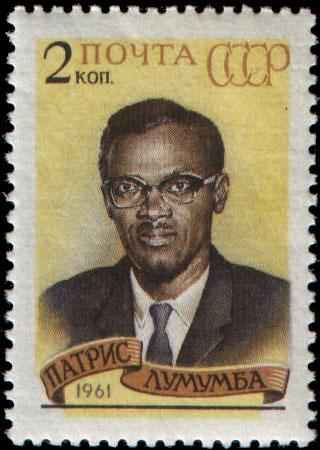
USSR commemorative stamp, 1961

In 1961, Adoula became Prime Minister of the Congo. Shortly after assuming office he went to Stanleyville and laid a wreath of flowers at an impromptu monument established for Lumumba. After Tshombe became Prime Minister in 1964, he also went to Stanleyville and did the same. On 30 June 1966, Mobutu—who was blamed for facilitating his killing—rehabilitated Lumumba's image and proclaimed him a Congolese hero. Specifically, at a ceremony featuring African leaders Kenneth Kaunda and Julius Nyerere, Mobutu said:

Glory and honor to the illustrious Congolese, the great African, the first martyr of our independence, Patrice Emery Lumumba, who fell victim to colonial machinations. In the name of the government, we officially proclaim him a national hero. (Note: In French: "Gloire et honneur à l'illustre Congolais, au grand Africain, au premier martyr de notre indépendance, Patrice Emery Lumumba, tombé victime des machinations colonialistes. Au nom du gouvernement, nous le proclamons officiellement en ce tour héros national... ")

Mobutu declared a series of other measures meant to commemorate Lumumba, though few of these were ever executed aside from the release of a banknote with his visage the subsequent year. This banknote was the only paper money during Mobutu's rule that bore the face of a leader other than the incumbent president. In the following years, state mentions of Lumumba declined and Mobutu's regime viewed unofficial tributes to him with suspicion. Following Laurent-Désiré Kabila's seizure of power in the 1990s, a new line of Congolese francs was issued bearing Lumumba's image. In 1961, a street in Belgrade was named after Lumumba.

In January 2003, Joseph Kabila, who succeeded his father as president, inaugurated a statue of Lumumba. In Guinea, Lumumba was featured on a coin and two regular banknotes despite not having any national ties to the country. This was an unprecedented occurrence in the modern history of national currency, as images of foreigners are normally reserved only for specially-released commemorative money. As of 2020, Lumumba has been featured on 16 different postage stamps. Many streets and public squares around the world have been named after him. The Peoples' Friendship University of Russia in Moscow (then Peoples' Friendship University of the USSR) was renamed "Patrice Lumumba Peoples' Friendship University" in 1961. It was renamed again in 1992 and back in 2023. In 2013, the planned community of Lumumbaville was named after him.

=== In popular culture ===
Lumumba is viewed as one of the "fathers of independence" of the Congo. The image of Lumumba appears frequently in social media and is often used as a rallying cry in demonstrations of social defiance. His figure is prevalent in art and literature, mostly outside of the Congo. He was referenced by numerous African-American writers of the American civil rights movement, especially in their works of the post-civil rights era. Malcolm X declared him "the greatest black man who ever walked the African continent".

Among the most prominent works featuring him are Aimé Césaire's 1966 play, Une saison au Congo, and Raoul Peck's 1992 documentary and 2000 feature film, Lumumba, la mort d'un prophète and Lumumba, respectively.

There is an Italian 1968 feature film 'Seduto alla sua destra' (lit. 'Sitting to his right') by Valerio Zurlini, where the last days of the character Maurice Lalubi (played by Woody Strode), based upon Patrice Lumumba, are presented as the Passion of Christ. This movie was included in the 1968 Cannes Film Festival, which was cancelled due to the events of May 68 in France.

The 2024 Oscar-nominated documentary Soundtrack to a Coup d'Etat directed by Johan Grimonprez depicts the Congolese independence process and Lumumba's death.

Congolese musicians Franco Luambo and Joseph Kabasele both wrote songs in tribute to Lumumba shortly after his death. Other musical works mentioning him include "Lumumba" by Miriam Makeba, "Done Too Soon" by Neil Diamond and "Waltz for Lumumba" by the Spencer Davis Group. His name is also mentioned in rap music; Arrested Development, Nas, David Banner, Black Thought, Damso, Baloji, Médine, Sammus and many others have mentioned him in their work.

In popular painting, he is often paired with notions of sacrifice and redemption, even being portrayed as a messiah, with his downfall being his passion. Tshibumba Kanda-Matulu painted a series chronicling Lumumba's life and career. Lumumba is relatively absent from Congolese writing, and he is often portrayed with only subtle or ambiguous references. Congolese authors Sony Lab'ou Tansi's and Sylvain Bemba's fictional Parentheses of Blood and Léopolis, respectively, both feature characters with strong similarities to Lumumba. In written tributes to Mobutu, Lumumba is usually portrayed as an adviser to the former. Writer Charles Djungu-Simba observed, "Lumumba is rather considered as a vestige of the past, albeit an illustrious past". His surname is often used to identify a long drink of hot or cold chocolate and rum.

=== Tribute at the 2025 Africa Cup of Nations ===
During the 2025 Africa Cup of Nations held in Morocco, Michel Nkuka Mboladinga, a Congolese supporter of the DR Congo national football team gained attention by standing motionless for the full duration of all of his teams group-stage matches in a pose resembling Lumumba's memorial statue in Kinshasa. Dressed in attire reminiscent of him, the fan was nicknamed "Lumumba Vea" by fans and media. He did this as a symbolic tribute to Lumumba's legacy of national pride. The gesture was widely shared on social media and reported in international news outlets. He repeated his tribute at the 2026 FIFA World Cup.

== Honours ==
- Morocco: Grand Cordon of the Order of the Throne (8 August 1960).
- South Africa: Supreme Companion in gold of the Order of the Companions of O. R. Tambo (16 June 2004, posthumously).
- Tunisia: Grand Cordon of the Order of Independence (3 August 1960).

== Footnotes ==
Political offices
Preceded by Position created on independence from Belgium	Prime Minister of the Democratic Republic of the Congo; 24 June – 5 September 1960	Succeeded by Joseph Iléo
