= Maurice Mpolo =

Congolese politician (1928–1961)

Minister of Youth and Sports of the Republic of the Congo
- In office 24 June 1960 – 14 September 1960
- President: Joseph Kasa-Vubu
- Preceded by: position established

Member of the Chamber of Deputies for Lac Léopold II
- In office 1960 – 17 January 1961

Personal details
- Born: 12 September 1928 Inongo, Belgian Congo (Now Congo-Kinshasa)
- Died: 17 January 1961 (aged 32) Near Élisabethville, Katanga (Now Lubumbashi)
- Party: Mouvement National Congolais

Maurice Mpolo (12 September 1928 – 17 January 1961) was a Congolese politician who served as Minister of Youth and Sports of the Republic of the Congo in 1960. He briefly led the Congolese army that July. He was executed alongside Prime Minister Patrice Lumumba in Katanga in 1961.

== Biography ==
Maurice Mpolo was born on 12 September 1928 (Note: According to Kashamura, Mpolo was born on 12 August. Heinz and Donnay (pseudonyms of Jacques Brassinne and Jules Gérard-Libois) state that he was born on 4 March.) in Inongo, Belgian Congo. His father was Alphonse Membe. He had five years of primary education before studying as a novitiate for three years at the Fréres des Écoles Chrétiennes à Tumba. He later attended school in Léopoldville but was forced to drop out due to domestic problems. He became involved in several private enterprises and served in the colonial police force, though he was dismissed from duty on 10 September 1952, after being repeatedly reprimanded for displaying arrogance and indiscipline. Mpolo also worked as a journalist and was arrested by the Belgian administration for publishing opinions they considered "displaced", though he was freed after an appeal. He eventually became the president of the Léopoldville chapter of the Mouvement National Congolais (MNC) and participated in the Belgo-Congolese Round Table Conference in Brussels, Belgium on the organisation's behalf.

=== Government career ===
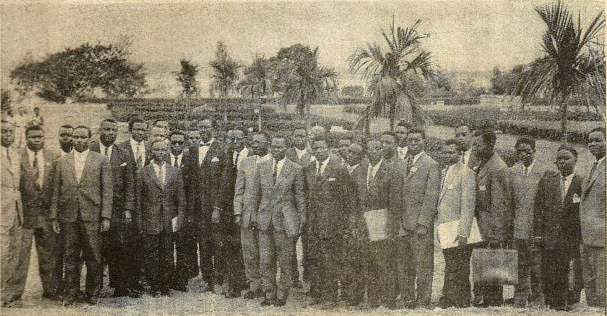
The first Congolese government. Mpolo stands seventh from the right.

"Maurice Mpolo...was quick-tempered and daring, and his character gave the appearance of being hard. His youth had been very turbulent, and he had had much to suffer; among the young men of Léopoldville he was considered one of the tough ones. Shortly after leaving school, he had become a policeman, and was feared for the reputation he had then achieved as an intractable and merciless man to cross swords with."

— Thomas Kanza's reflection on Mpolo

With the independence of the Republic of the Congo in June 1960, Mpolo was elected to the Chamber of Deputies as a representative from the Lac Léopold II District. He was subsequently appointed by Prime Minister Patrice Lumumba to be Minister of Youth and Sports, effectively becoming the government's chief propagandist. He briefly stood in for General Victor Lundula as commander in chief of the Armée Nationale Congolaise (ANC) in July (earning the title of General) but got in a dispute with the army chief of staff, Colonel Joseph-Désiré Mobutu. On 28 July, Mpolo was made a member of a cabinet committee established to handle Congolese relations with United Nations officials. On 13 September, Lumumba declared him commander-in-chief of the ANC.

On 14 September, Mobutu launched a coup which "neutralised" Lumumba's government and created a new one. Mpolo attempted to undermine it and rivaled Mobutu for control of the army. On 23 September, Mpolo and Deputy Prime Minister Antoine Gizenga were arrested and plans were made to send them to secessionist Katanga. The United Nations (UN) put pressure on Mobutu to release them, which he did the following day. On 7 October, Lumumba announced that he had formed a new cabinet that included Mpolo as Minister of Defence. Mpolo told the press that he believed all of the conflicted parties in the central government would eventually unite. Angered by this, Mobutu dispatched troops to Mpolo's house, but he was nowhere to be found. Later that day Mpolo was able to return to his home unmolested and requested that the UN strengthen its guard at his residence.

=== Arrest and death ===
In late November, Lumumba fled the capital to organise a new government in Stanleyville. He was captured before he could complete his escape and imprisoned at the army camp in Thysville. Mpolo also intended on reaching Stanleyville, but before he left he addressed a crowd of Lumumba's supporters at Lac Léopold II. With Mobutu's government fearing Mpolo's potential to rally support for his cause, troops were dispatched to find him and arrested him in Mushie. He was later transferred to Thysville, along with Vice President of the Senate Joseph Okito. On 17 January 1961, discipline in the base faltered and all three men were flown to Élisabethville, Katanga. Once there, they were brutally tortured at the hands of Moïse Tshombe and Godefroid Munongo, Lumumba's chief political rivals and the leaders of the secessionist state. That night, one by one they were lined up against a tree to be executed by firing squad. Mpolo was the second to be shot. The bodies were thrown into a shallow grave. The following morning, on orders of Katangan Interior Minister Godefroid Munongo who wanted to make the bodies disappear and thereby prevent a burial site from being created, Belgian Gendarmerie officer Gerard Soete and his team dug up and dismembered the corpses, and dissolved them in sulfuric acid while the bones were ground and scattered.

On 17 January 2011, a mass of thanksgiving was held in memory of Mpolo and Okito at the Notre-Dame Cathedral in Kinshasa.
