= Gerard Soete =

Belgian writer and teacher (1920–2000)

Gerard Soete (29 January 1920 – 9 June 2000) was a Belgian officer in the colonial police of Congo, author, and teacher. One year before his death, in 1999, it became known that he was involved in the murder, dismemberment and disposal of the body of Patrice Lumumba (alongside his brother) in the aftermath of their assassination.

== Career in Congo ==
After studying German languages, Soete moved to the Belgian Congo in 1946 and became a member of the police force in Élisabethville, capital of Katanga. He ended his career in the force as the inspector-general of the police in Katanga. On 30 June 1960, the Belgian Congo became the independent Congo. Soete stayed in Katanga when, eleven days after Congo's independence, the State of Katanga was declared an independent country led by president Moïse Tshombe.

=== Murder of Lumumba ===
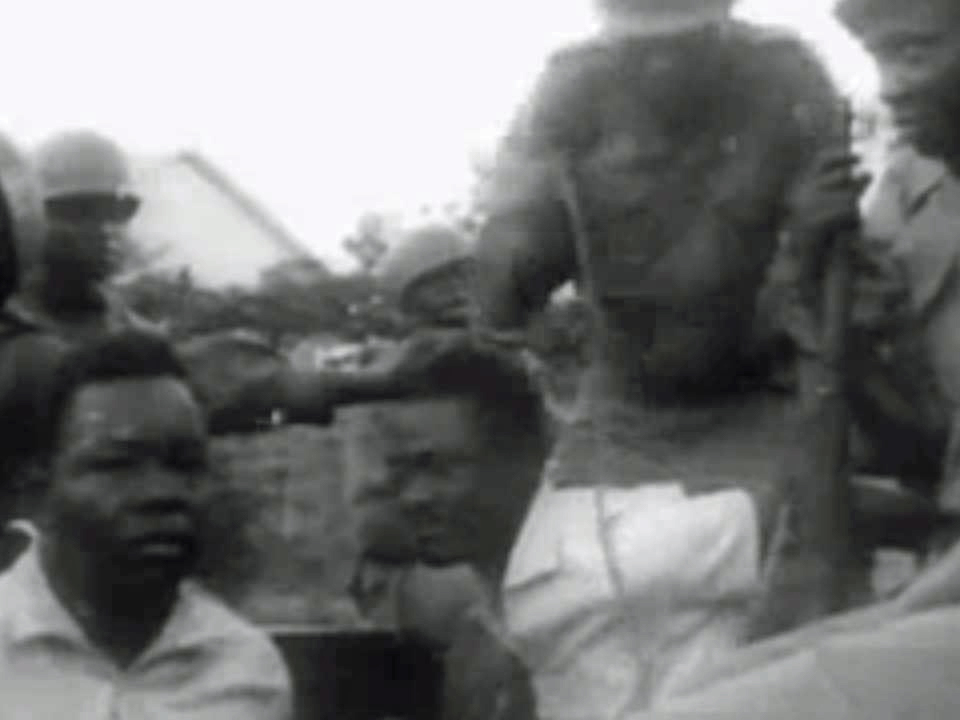
Okito and Lumumba before their transport to Thysville.

On 28 August 1987, Soete was interviewed by Jacques Brassinne de La Buissière, former civil servant in Katanga who was writing a PhD dissertation on the murder of first prime minister of Congo Patrice Lumumba and his political allies Maurice Mpolo and Joseph Okito. Until the Belgian parliamentary inquiry into the murder of Lumumba in 2001, the PhD dissertation remained under embargo. Although Soete was not involved in the murder of Lumumba, police commissioner Frans Verscheure ordered him to dispose of the bodies. Soete and his brother exhumed the mortal remains, cut them into pieces with a hacksaw, and dissolved them in sulphuric acid. At an interview on German television, Soete later showed a bullet that went through Lumumba's body, and two teeth that he pried off.

In 1999, Ludo De Witte published De moord op Lumumba, translated as The assassination of Lumumba. The author interviewed Soete, who confessed openly that he was present to exhume and destroy the bodies, and added that he had no remorse doing so.

The publication of De Witte's book engendered a diplomatic crisis between Belgium and Congo, which in turn sparked the parliamentary inquiry. Soete was asked to deliver the teeth to the inquiry, but claimed to have thrown them into the North Sea.

Soete died in 2000. In January 2016, a tooth purporting to be of Lumumba's body was confiscated at the house of Soete's daughter Godelieve. Four years later, a Belgian judge ruled that Belgium must return the tooth. In December 2020, Congolese president Félix Tshisekedi declared that the tooth will return to Congo in 2021 and that Lumumba will receive a proper burial place.

== Later life ==
Soete stayed another ten years in Congo and was active under Mobutu Sese Seko's regime. In 1972, he moved to Bruges and became a language teacher at Saint Leo College until his retirement. Furthermore, he was a writer of novels and non-fiction about the colonial life in Congo. In his novel De arena of 1978, he describes the murder of Lumumba in all its gruesome details. He sometimes wrote under the pseudonym Geert Van Puthen. Besides his novels and non-fiction books, he wrote a great deal of articles which were published in the cultural magazine Kruispunt.

Soete died in his house in Sint-Kruis. According to Godelieve Soete, he was "executed because of what he did in Congo at the time. A member of the Lumumba Commission once literally told me that." Officially, however, he died of cardiac arrest.

Soete is the grandfather of media presenter Julie Van den Steen.

== Publications ==
=== Books ===
- De achterhoede, Bruges, Darthet, 1967 (as Geert Van Puthen)
- Negropolis, Brussels, Reinaert, 1971 (as Geert Van Puthen)
- De stroom, of handleiding voor een revolutie, Zele, Reinaert, 1976
- Keerverbod, Bruges, Orion, 1976
- De arena: het verhaal van de moord op Lumumba, Bruges, Raaklijn, 1978
- De afrekening, Nijmegen, Gottmer, 1980
- Hotel Roze uren, Brecht, De Roerdomp, 1985
- De grijshemden, Antwerp, Standaard, 1988
- De gekke monnik, Leuven, De Clauwaert, 1991 (historical novel about Hugo Van der Goes).
- Het einde van de grijshemden: onze koloniale politie, Zedelgem, Flandria Nostra, 1993
- Burenpsalm, Zedelgem, Flandria Nostra, 1993

=== Articles in Kruispunt ===
- Exotisch decor, 1996, p. 158-161
- Acculturatie, 1997, p. 220-222
- Ongeremde fantasie, 1997, p. 266-268, about the Kuba King
- Op zoek naar onszelf ?, 1998, p. 222-225
