= Jacques Lowe =

German photographer (1930–2001)

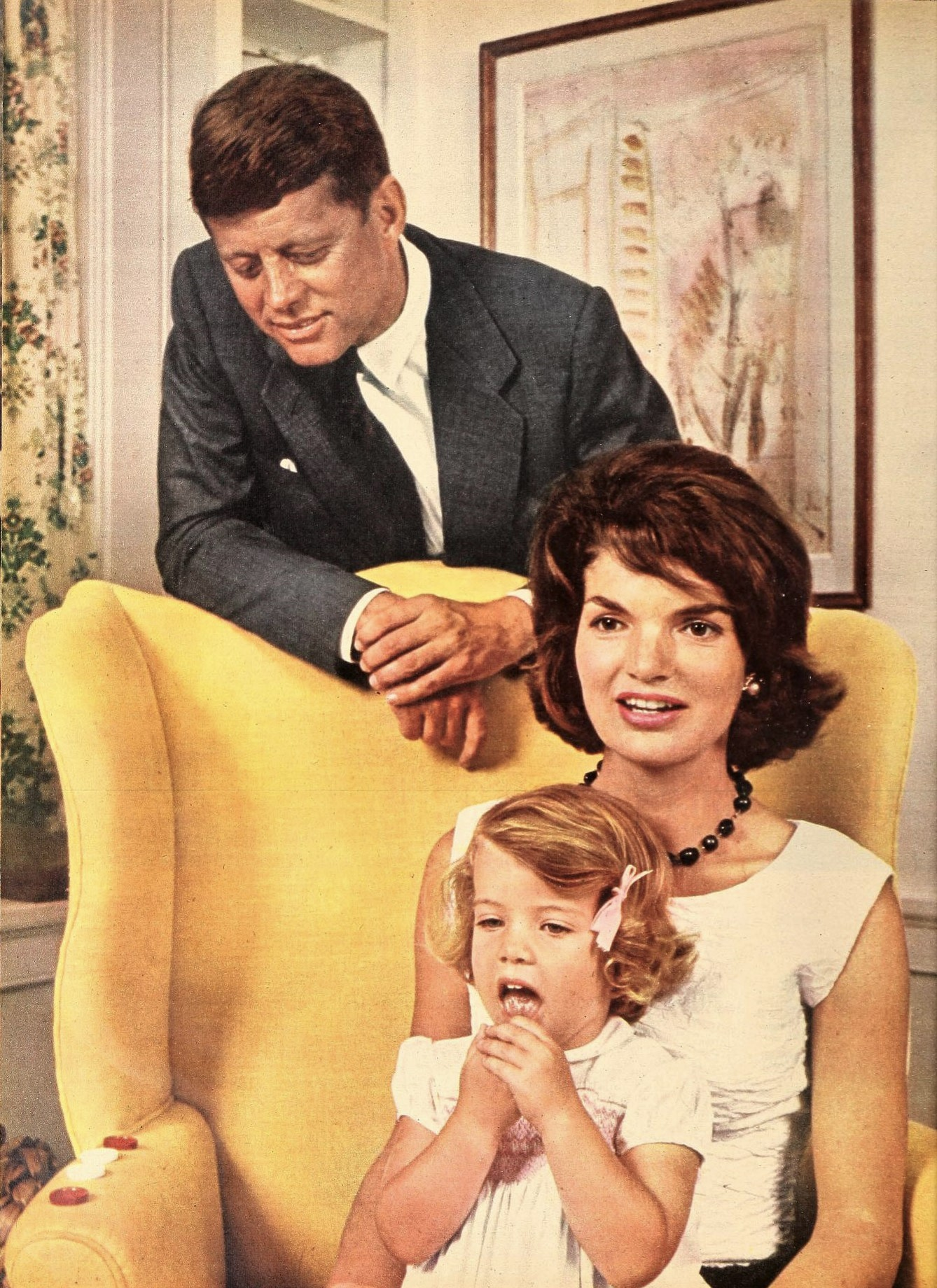
John, Jacqueline and Caroline Kennedy, 1960

Jacques Lowe (born Jascha Lülsdorf; January 24, 1930 – May 12, 2001) was a photographer and publisher best known for his role as U.S. President John F. Kennedy's official photographer during his election campaign and presidency.

Lowe was born in Cologne, Germany, on Jan. 24, 1930. He came to New York in 1949 and became an assistant to the photographer Arnold Newman in 1951.

Lowe began working as Kennedy's campaign photographer in 1958, and documented the Kennedy administration after his election until 1962

Lowe died at his home in Manhattan on May 12, 2001. Months after his death, approximately 40,000 of Lowe's negatives were destroyed in the September 11 attacks on the World Trade Center.

In 2013, two exhibitions were held to mark the 50th anniversary of the assassination of John F. Kennedy, WESTWOOD GALLERY NYC, in SoHo, New York, blocks away from Lowe's loft in Tribeca, and Proud Galleries Chelsea in London. Both exhibitions included vintage and modern prints from the estate of Jacques Lowe, printed and signed by him. WESTWOOD GALLERY NYC also presented Lowe's last exhibition during his lifetime, in 1999.

In 2025, a feature documentary "Capturing Kennedy" shared Lowe's full life story for the first time on film, from his youth in WWII Germany to his career with Kennedy and the later loss of his negatives on 9/11. The film included rare interviews with Lowe some time before his death, showing one of the few first-hand records of his experiences.
