= Ferdinand Kazadi =

Congolese politician (1925–1984)

Ferdinand Kazadi Lupeleka (24 April 1925 – 26 June 1984) was a Congolese politician from the Democratic Republic of the Congo. Kazadi was a founding member of the College of Commissioners where he had been appointed General Commissioner of National Defense by President Joseph Mobutu, during the Congo Crisis in 1960. In 1969, he was appointed Commissioner of State for Public Matters and Territorial Management. He was elected Deputy Commissioner of the People on three occasions (1966, 1972 and 1977).

== Early life ==
Kazadi was born in Katende wa Bakwa Mwanza, north of Demba in the Kasaï-Central region on April 24, 1925. His parents, Helene Ngalula Mulanga and Jean Dibomba Kabongo, had four children, of which Kazadi was the only son. Higher education was mainly provided by Catholic and Protestant missionaries. Kazadi had successfully completed high school at the Scheut Mission of Kabwe from 1934 to 1939. He distinguished himself through his abilities and the conspicuous influence of a Catechist father, so he was sent to the Small Seminary of Kabwe Ste Therese in December 1939, as few other choices were available to the elite. After six years of higher education, in 1946 he was admitted to the Large Seminary of Kabwe, in order to pursue studies in philosophy and theology for the next eight years.

Kazadi was on the path to enter priesthood after 14 years of seminary studies, but he abandoned to protect his clan's lineage. Therefore, in 1952, he undertook career in public service. Kazadi first became the Official to the Provincial Secretariat, and later became a Specialist at the Governor Cabinet of the Kasai Province.

In parallel with his administrative career, Kazadi participated in the independence struggle. Using the pen name "Kazadi wa Kabwe", he distinguished himself through his writings. In 1954, the first Congolese university, Lovanium University, opened in Leopoldville (Kinshasa). His ambition to acquire a better education despite his familial duties, led him to enroll in 1955 in the Political and Social Sciences Department. He received a degree in sociology in 1960. He wrote a memoir upon completing his studies, entitled The Life of An Unemployed in Kinshasa in 1960. During his years at Lovanium, he was nicknamed "Bismarck" due to his loyalty and firmness, based on German chancellor Otto von Bismarck.

Kazadi was fluent in Chinese, Dutch, French, English, Latin, Swahili, Kikongo, Lingala, and Ciluba. He read extensively and loved classical music, which he was also able to read. He was a proficient harmonium player. He married Madeleine Mianda Ngadu in 1953.

== Political career ==
=== General Commissioner of Defense ===
On 14 September 1960, colonel Mobutu took over for the first time, neutralizing President Kasa-Vubu, arresting Prime Minister Lumumba and seizing power. Mobutu called upon the people's elite, the few university graduates still residing in the country, to form a government: the College of Commissioners-General. These individuals were in charge until February 1961.

Kazadi was one of these individuals and was placed as General Commissioner of National Defense.

=== In South Kasai ===
"South Kasai's acting chief, Mr. Kazadi, is an impressive man. He speaks forcefully, quickly, and frequently. He often wears a cream-colored nylon shirt and an expensive and beautifully tailored blue suit. He wears gold bracelets, gold cuff links and a diamonds stick pin, and he keeps in his office a whiskey bottle filled with his personal collection of $3,000,000 worth of industrial diamonds."

— Journalist David Halberstam, 1962

The Lulua–Baluba conflicts were stimulated by the colonizers and Lumumba's refusal of a resolution on behalf of the MNC. The exodus of the Balubas ensued, led them to relocate to southern Kasai. Kasai seceded as did Katanga. The Independent State of Southern Kasai existed from August 1960 to July 1961. Kazadi was its Police Force Minister.

At the end of the Independent State of Southern Kasai, he escaped to Brazzaville.

=== Under Mobutu ===
Two years after the resumption of power by Mobutu in 1964, elections took place and Kazadi was elected National Deputy in 1966. Following this, he became Head of Research at the Office of National Research and Development.

The creation of the Popular Movement of the Revolution in 1967, a party led by President Mobutu, effectively provoked the closing and dismissal of Parliament.

In 1969, he was named Commissioner of State for Public Matters and Territorial Management. In the course of his passage, he founded the School of Truck-Driving Engineers in Kingabwa, Kinshasa. In 1970, he was promoted to Commander of National Order of the Leopard and was later appointed as Minister of State.

Kazadi retired from political affairs in 1980.

== See also ==
- Congo Crisis
- 1960 Belgian Congo general election
- Jean Nguza Karl-i-Bond
