= Ludo De Witte =

Belgian writer (born 1956)

Ludo De Witte (born 1956) is a Belgian sociologist, writer, and political activist internationally known for his book The assassination of Lumumba, on the murder of Patrice Lumumba. In his latest work, Als de laatste boom geveld is, eten we ons geld wel op: kapitalisme versus de aarde, De Witte promotes eco-socialism, stating that to save the world from ecocide, it and its people must be freed from the yoke of capitalism. De Witte also advocates a close cooperation between red and green in their mutual anti-capitalistic fight to save the planet from its demise.

== Works ==
- Crisis in Kongo : de rol van de Verenigde Naties, de regering-Eyskens en het Koningshuis in de omverwerping van Lumumba en de opkomst van Mobutu. Leuven: Van Halewyck. 1996.
- The assassination of Lumumba. London, New York: Verso. 2001. ISBN 1-85984-618-1.
- Wie is bang voor moslims? Aantekeningen over Dyab Abou Jahjah, etnocentrisme en islamofobie (Van Halewyck, 2004)
- Huurlingen, geheim agenten en diplomaten (Van Halewyck, 2014)
- Als de laatste boom geveld is, eten we ons geld wel op: kapitalisme versus de aarde (EPO, 2017)
- Moord in Burundi: België en de liquidatie van premier Louis Rwagasore (OEP, 2021)
