= Pierre Wigny =

Belgian politician

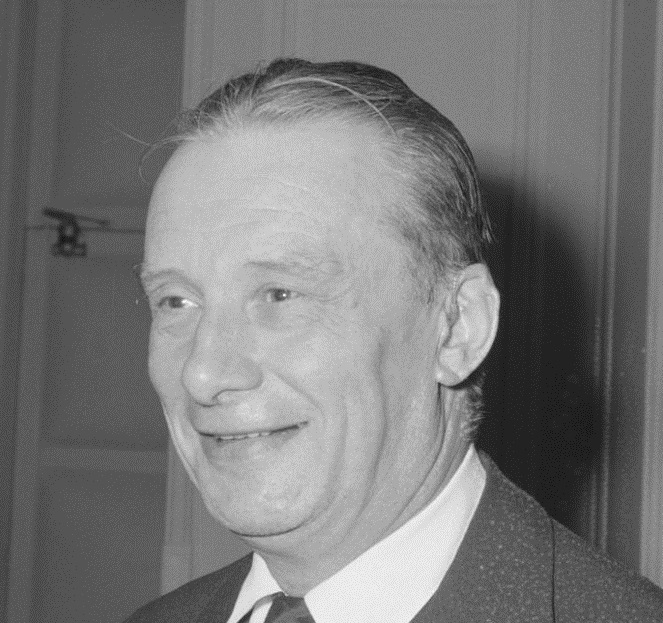
Pierre Wigny, 1966

Pierre Wigny (18 April 1905 in Liège – 21 September 1986 in Brussels) was a Belgian politician of the Christian Social Party (French: Parti Social Chrétien, PSC).

He was a lawyer and a member of the Chamber of Representatives from 1949 to 1971. He was also a member of the Common Assembly of the European Coal and Steel Community from its establishment in 1952 to 1958, and was the second President of the Christian Democratic group, the predecessor of the European People's Party Group, in 1958.

He served as Minister of the Colonies from 1947 to 1950, as Foreign Minister from 1958 to 1961, as Minister of Justice from 1965 to 1966 and as Minister of Culture in the Government of the French Community from 1966 to 1968.

He received the Robert Schuman Medal in 1986.
