= Victor Lundula =

Congolese politician and soldier

Victor Richard Lundula
- Lundula Okoko Ta Mongo
- Died: 1980s
- Occupation: Soldier

Victor Richard Lundula or Lundula Okoko Ta Mongo was a Congolese politician and soldier who served as the first Commander-in-Chief of the Armée Nationale Congolaise.

He was a civilian who had been a medical orderly in the Force Publique during the Burma campaign and was a tribal cousin of first Congolese Prime Minister Patrice Lumumba. On 8 April 1953 he was promoted to second class senior nurse.

Lundula was promoted in one leap from sergeant-major to major general on the formation of the ANC. After the severe riots that followed (the beginning of the Congo Crisis), Lundula sought to intervene in several incidents, personally rescued some Europeans from harm and averted trouble wherever possible. In September 1960, when President Kasavubu deposed Lumumba as prime minister, Lundula was jailed for two months. At the end of November 1960 he was released and escaped to Stanleyville in the Eastern Province, and became Antoine Gizenga's military chief. In January 1962, Lundula imprisoned Gizenga in Stanleyville.

He died in the early 1980s.
