= Congo Crisis =

1960–1965 political unrest in Central Africa

- Part of the decolonisation of Africa and the Cold War
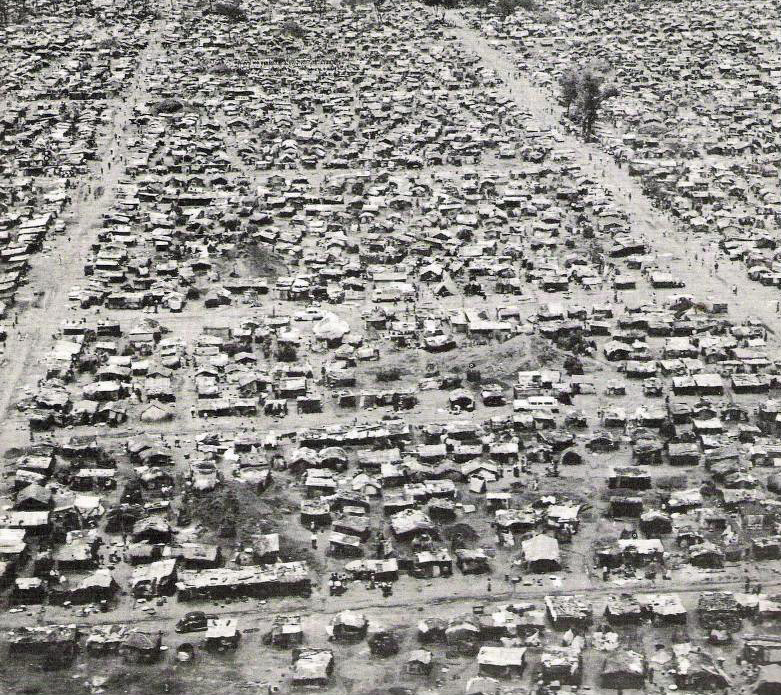
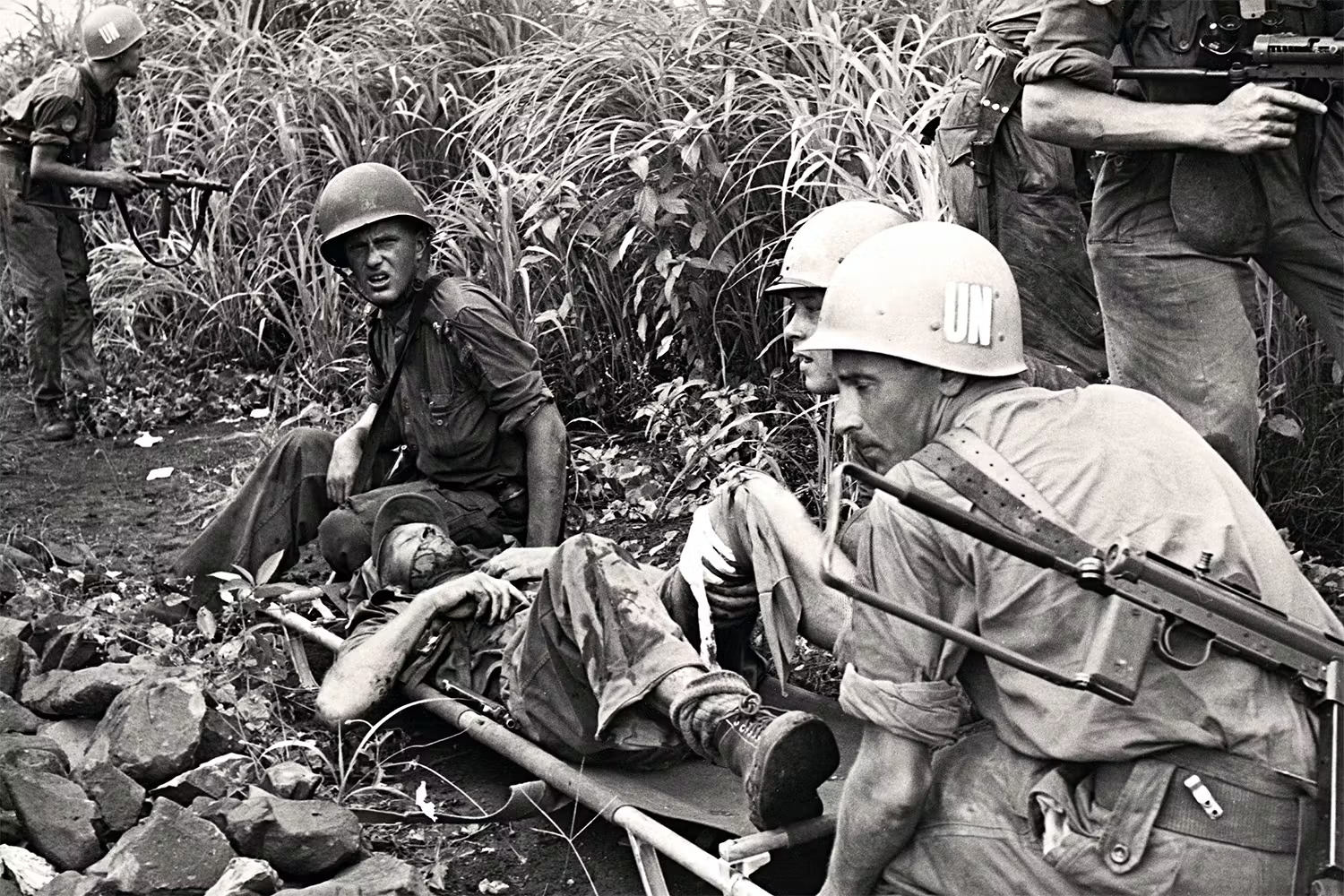
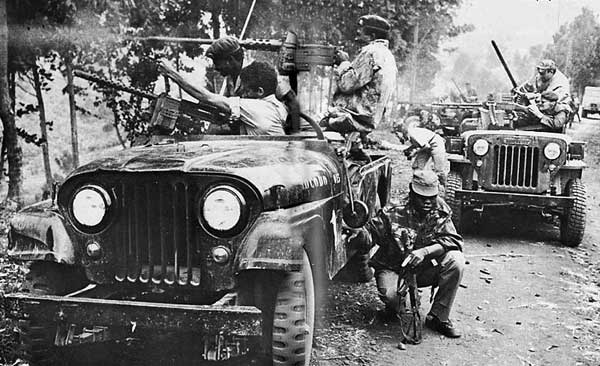
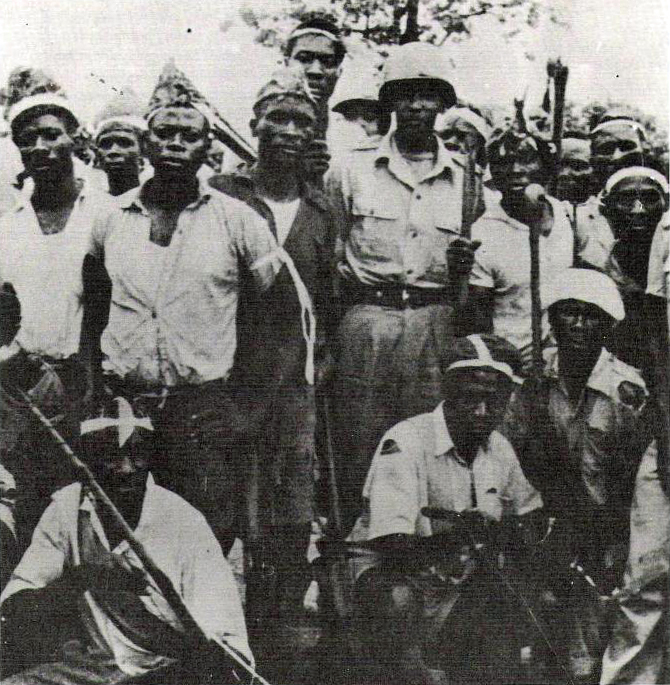
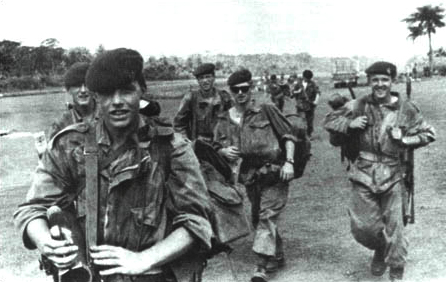
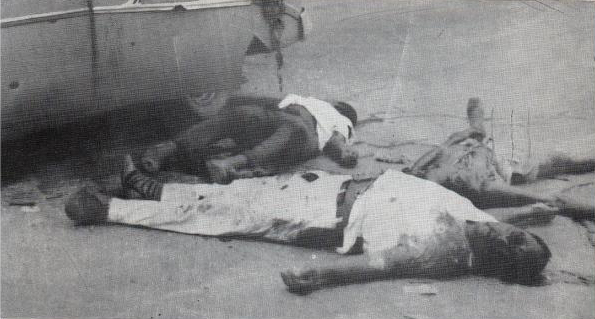
- Clockwise starting from top left: Refugee camp outside Élisabethville; Peacekeepers tending to a wounded comrade; Armed Luba civilians; Massacred civilians in Lodja; Belgian paratroopers during Dragon Rouge; Government forces fighting Simba rebels
Date	5 July 1960 – 25 November 1965 (5 years, 4 months, 2 weeks and 6 days)
Location	Republic of the Congo
Result	The Congo established as an independent unitary state under the authoritarian presidency of Mobutu Sese Seko.

Belligerents
1960–1963: (Democratic Republic of the Congo) Republic of the Congo; Supported by: Soviet Union (1960); (United Nations) ONUC (Note: ONUC, the United Nations Operation in the Congo, included troops from Ghana, Tunisia, Morocco, Ethiopia, Ireland, Guinea, Sweden, Mali, Sudan, Liberia, Canada, India, Indonesia and the United Arab Republic among others.)	1960–1963: Katanga; South Kasai; Supported by: Belgium (Note: The secession of Katanga and South Kasai was also supported by South Africa, France, Portuguese Angola and the neighbouring Central African Federation. However, neither was ever officially recognised by any state.); 1960–1962: (Democratic Republic of the Congo) Free Republic of the Congo; Supported by: Soviet Union
1963–1965: Democratic Republic of the Congo; United States; Belgium; Supported by: (United Nations) ONUC (1964)	1963–1965: Kwilu and Simba rebels; Supported by: Soviet Union; China; Cuba

Commanders and leaders
(Democratic Republic of the Congo) Joseph Kasa-Vubu; (Democratic Republic of the Congo) Patrice Lumumba (executed); (Democratic Republic of the Congo) Cyrille Adoula; (United Nations) Dag Hammarskjöld †; (United Nations) U Thant; (Democratic Republic of the Congo) Joseph Kasa-Vubu; (Democratic Republic of the Congo) Joseph-Désiré Mobutu; (Democratic Republic of the Congo) Moïse Tshombe (from 1964)	(State of Katanga) Moïse Tshombe; (South Kasai) Albert Kalonji; (Belgium) Gaston Eyskens; (Belgium) Théo Lefèvre; (Democratic Republic of the Congo) Antoine Gizenga (POW); Pierre Mulele; Christophe Gbenye; (Cuba) Che Guevara

Casualties and losses
- Total killed: c. 100,000

The Congo Crisis (French: Crise congolaise) was a period of political upheaval and conflict between 1960 and 1965 in the Republic of the Congo (today the Democratic Republic of the Congo). (Note: Not to be confused with the neighbouring state known as the Republic of the Congo, formerly the French Congo, with its capital at Brazzaville. The state's name changed to the Democratic Republic of the Congo in August 1964.) The crisis began almost immediately after the Congo became independent from Belgium and ended, unofficially, with the entire country under the rule of Joseph-Désiré Mobutu. Constituting a series of civil wars, the Congo Crisis was also a proxy conflict in the Cold War, in which the Soviet Union and the United States supported opposing factions. Around 100,000 people are believed to have been killed during the crisis.

A nationalist movement in the Belgian Congo demanded the end of colonial rule: this led to the country's independence on 30 June 1960. Minimal preparations had been made and many issues, such as federalism, tribalism, and ethnic nationalism, remained unresolved. In the first week of July 1960, a mutiny broke out in the army and violence erupted between black and white civilians. Belgium sent troops to protect fleeing white citizens. Katanga and South Kasai seceded with Belgian support. Amid continuing unrest and violence, the United Nations deployed peacekeepers, but UN secretary-general Dag Hammarskjöld refused to use these troops to help the central government in Léopoldville (Kinshasa) fight the secessionists. Prime Minister Patrice Lumumba, the charismatic leader of the largest nationalist faction, reacted by calling for assistance from the Soviet Union, which promptly sent military advisers and other support.

The involvement of the Soviets split the Congolese government and led to an impasse between Lumumba and President Joseph Kasa-Vubu. Mobutu, at that time Lumumba's chief military aide and a lieutenant-colonel in the army, broke this deadlock with a coup d'état, expelled the Soviet advisors and established a new government effectively under his own control. Lumumba was taken captive and subsequently executed in 1961. A rival government of the "Free Republic of the Congo" was founded in the eastern city of Stanleyville, present day Kisangani, by Lumumba supporters led by Antoine Gizenga. It gained Soviet support but was crushed in early 1962. Meanwhile, the UN took a more aggressive stance towards the secessionists after Hammarskjöld was killed in a plane crash in late 1961. Supported by UN troops, Léopoldville defeated secessionist movements in Katanga and South Kasai by the start of 1963.

With Katanga and South Kasai back under the government's control, a compromise constitution aimed at reconciliation was adopted and the exiled Katangese leader, Moïse Tshombe, was recalled to head an interim administration while fresh elections were organised. Before these could be held, however, Maoist-inspired militants calling themselves the "Simbas" rose up in the east of the country. The Simbas took control of a significant amount of territory and proclaimed a communist "People's Republic of the Congo" in Stanleyville (Kisangani). Government forces gradually retook territory and, in November 1964, Belgium and the United States intervened militarily in Stanleyville. The Simbas were defeated and collapsed soon after. Following the elections in March 1965, a new political stalemate developed between Tshombe and Kasa-Vubu, forcing the government into near-paralysis. Mobutu mounted a second coup d'état in November 1965, taking personal control of the country. Under Mobutu's rule, the Congo (renamed Zaire in 1971) was transformed into a dictatorship which would endure until his deposition in 1997.

== Background ==
=== Belgian rule ===
The Belgian Congo, today the Democratic Republic of the Congo, highlighted on a map of Africa

Colonial rule in the Congo began in the late 19th century. King Leopold II of Belgium, frustrated by Belgium's lack of international power and prestige, attempted to persuade the Belgian government to support colonial expansion around the then-largely unexplored Congo Basin. The Belgian government's ambivalence about the idea led Leopold to eventually create the colony on his own account. With support from a number of Western countries, who viewed Leopold as a useful buffer between rival colonial powers, Leopold achieved international recognition for a personal colony, the Congo Free State, in 1885. By the turn of the century, however, the violence of Free State officials against indigenous Congolese and the system of economic extraction had led to intense diplomatic pressure on Belgium to take official control of the country, which it did in 1908, creating the Belgian Congo.

Belgian rule in the Congo was based around the "colonial trinity" (trinité coloniale) of state, missionary and private company interests. The privileging of Belgian commercial interests meant that capital sometimes flowed back into the Congo and that individual regions became specialised. On many occasions, the interests of the government and private enterprise became closely tied and the state helped companies with strikebreaking and countering other efforts by the indigenous population to better their lot. The country was split into nesting, hierarchically organised administrative subdivisions, and run uniformly according to a set "native policy" (politique indigène)—in contrast to the British and the French, who generally favoured the system of indirect rule whereby traditional leaders were retained in positions of authority under colonial oversight. There was also a high degree of racial segregation. Large numbers of white immigrants who moved to the Congo after the end of World War II came from across the social spectrum, but were nonetheless always treated as superior to black people.

During the 1940s and 1950s, the Congo experienced an unprecedented level of urbanisation and the colonial administration began various development programmes aimed at making the territory into a "model colony". One of the results of the measures was the development of a new middle class of Europeanised African "évolués" in the cities. By the 1950s, the Congo had a wage labour force twice as large as that in any other African colony. The Congo's rich natural resources, including uranium—much of the uranium used by the U.S. nuclear programme during World War II was Congolese—led to substantial interest in the region from both the Soviet Union and the United States as the Cold War developed.

=== Politics and radicalisation ===
An African nationalist movement developed in the Belgian Congo during the 1950s, primarily among the évolués. The movement was divided into a number of parties and groups which were broadly divided on ethnic and geographical lines and opposed to one another. The largest, the Mouvement National Congolais (MNC), was a united front organisation dedicated to achieving independence "within a reasonable" time. It was created around a charter which was signed by, among others, Patrice Lumumba, Cyrille Adoula and Joseph Iléo, but others accused the party of being too moderate. Lumumba became a leading figure within the MNC, and by the end of 1959, the party claimed to have 58,000 members.

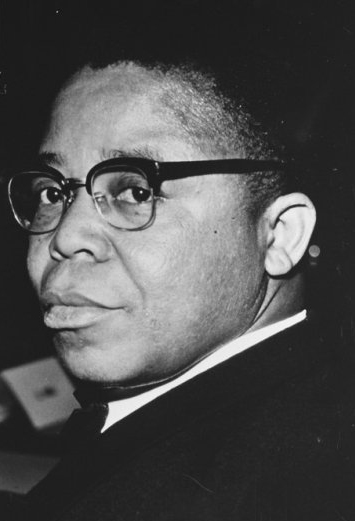
The leader of ABAKO, Joseph Kasa-Vubu, who later became the independent Congo's first President

The MNC's main rival was the Alliance des Bakongo (ABAKO), (Note: In most Bantu languages, the prefix ba- (or wa-) is added to a human noun to form a plural. As such, Bakongo refers collectively to members of the Kongo ethnic group.) led by Joseph Kasa-Vubu, who advocated a more radical ideology than the MNC, based around calls for immediate independence and the promotion of regional identity. ABAKO's stance was more ethnic nationalist than the MNC's; it argued that an independent Congo should be run by the Bakongo as inheritors of the pre-colonial Kingdom of the Kongo. The Confédération des Associations Tribales du Katanga (CONAKAT), a localist party led by Moïse Tshombe, was the third major organisation; it advocated federalism and primarily represented the southern province of Katanga. These were joined by a number of smaller parties which emerged as the nationalist movement developed, including the radical Parti Solidaire Africain (PSA), and factions representing the interests of minor ethnic groups like the Alliance des Bayanzi (ABAZI).

Although it was the largest of the African nationalist parties, the MNC had many different factions within it that took differing stances on a number of issues. It was increasingly polarised between moderate évolués and the more radical mass membership. A radical faction headed by Iléo and Albert Kalonji split away in July 1959, but failed to induce mass defections by other MNC members. The dissident faction became known as the MNC-Kalonji (MNC-K), while the majority group became the MNC-Lumumba (MNC-L). The split divided the party's support base into those who remained with Lumumba, chiefly in the Stanleyville region in the north-east, and those who backed the MNC-K, which became most popular around the southern city of Élisabethville and among the Luba ethnic group.

Major riots broke out in Léopoldville, the Congolese capital, on 4 January 1959 after a political demonstration turned violent. The Force Publique, the colonial gendarmerie, used force against the rioters—at least 49 people were killed, and total casualties may have been as high as 500. The nationalist parties' influence expanded outside the major cities for the first time, and nationalist demonstrations and riots became a regular occurrence over the next year, bringing large numbers of black people from outside the évolué class into the independence movement. Many black people began to test the boundaries of the colonial system by refusing to pay taxes or abide by minor colonial regulations. The bulk of the ABAKO leadership was arrested, leaving the MNC in an advantageous position.

These developments led to the white community also becoming increasingly alarmed. Some white people looked to a possible military government to restore order while others petitioned the colonial government for crackdowns. As law and order began to break down, white civilians formed militia groups known as Corps de Volontaires Européens ("European Volunteer Corps") to police their neighborhoods, but these militias were outlawed on March 25.

=== Independence ===
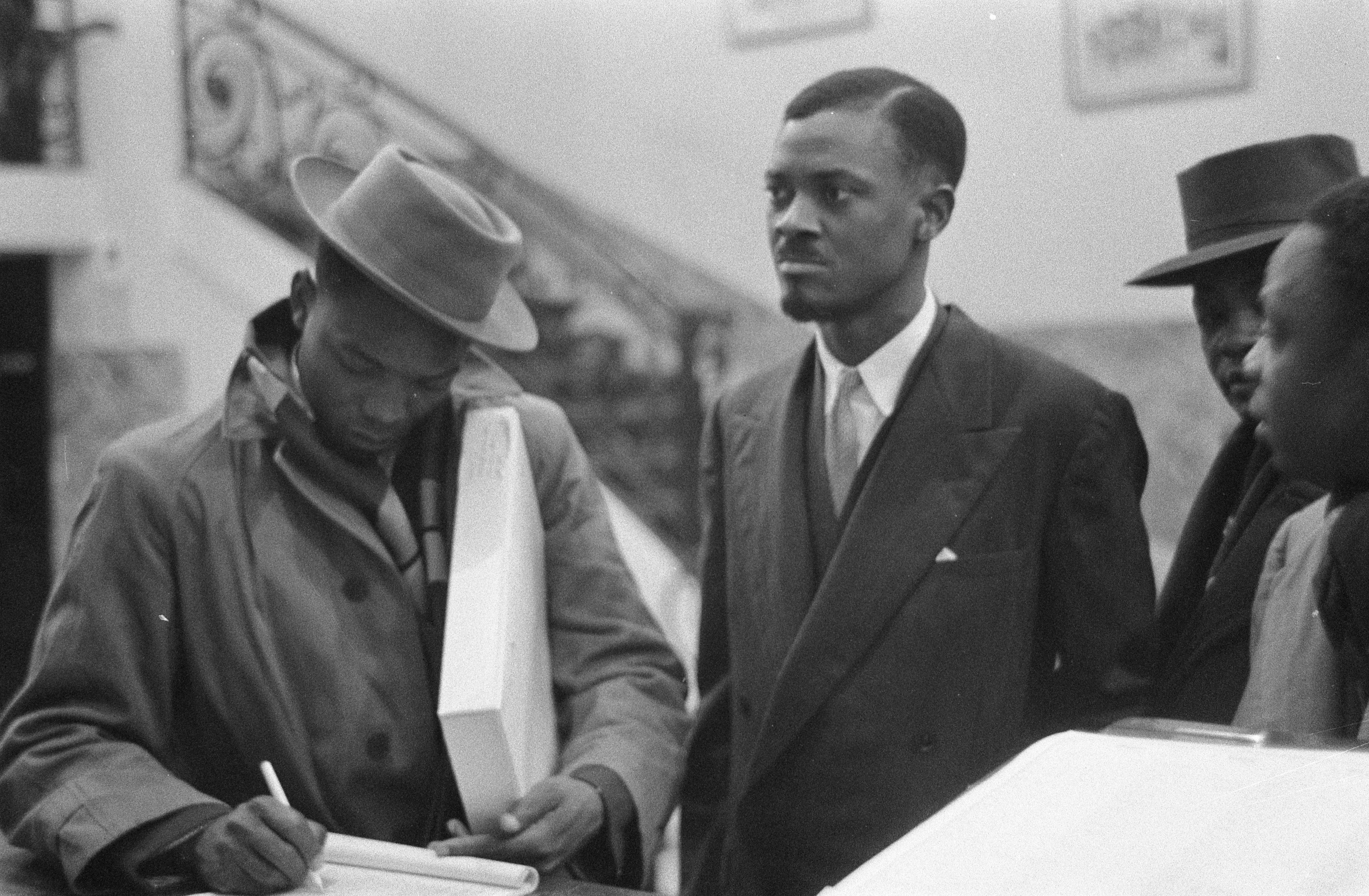
Patrice Lumumba, leader of the MNC-L and first Prime Minister, pictured in Brussels at the Round Table Conference of 1960

In the fallout from the Léopoldville riots, the report of a Belgian parliamentary working group on the future of the Congo was published. It noted a strong demand for "internal autonomy". August de Schryver, the Minister of the Colonies, launched a high-profile Round Table Conference in Brussels in January 1960, with the leaders of all the major Congolese parties (including the ABAKO, PSA, CONAKAT, ABAZI and both the Lumumba and Kalonji factions of the MNC) in attendance. Lumumba, who had been arrested following riots in Stanleyville, was released in the run-up to the conference and headed the MNC-L delegation. The Belgian government had hoped for a period of at least 30 years before independence, but Congolese pressure at the conference led to 30 June 1960 being set as the date. Delegates failed to reach an agreement concerning the issues of federalism, ethnicity and the future role of Belgium in Congolese affairs.

Belgians began campaigning against Lumumba, whom they wanted to marginalise; they accused him of being a communist and, hoping to fragment the nationalist movement, supported rival, ethnic-based parties like CONAKAT. Many Belgians hoped that an independent Congo would form part of a federation, like the French Community or Britain's Commonwealth of Nations, and that close economic and political association with Belgium would continue. As independence approached, the Belgian government organised Congolese elections in May 1960. These resulted in an MNC relative majority.

The proclamation of the independent Republic of the Congo, and the end of colonial rule, occurred as planned on 30 June 1960. In a ceremony at the Palais de la Nation in Léopoldville, King Baudouin gave a speech in which he presented the end of colonial rule in the Congo as the culmination of the Belgian "civilising mission" begun by Leopold II. After the King's address, Lumumba gave an unscheduled speech in which he angrily attacked colonialism and described independence as the crowning success of the nationalist movement. Although Lumumba's address was acclaimed by figures such as Malcolm X, it nearly provoked a diplomatic incident with Belgium; even some Congolese politicians perceived it as unnecessarily provocative. Nevertheless, independence was celebrated across the Congo.

Politically, the new state had a semi-presidential constitution, known as the Loi Fondamentale, in which executive power was shared between president and prime minister in a system known as bicephalisme. Kasa-Vubu was proclaimed president, and Lumumba prime minister, of the Republic of the Congo. Despite the objections of CONAKAT and others, the constitution was largely centralist, concentrating power in the central government in Léopoldville, and did not devolve significant powers to provincial level.

== Beginning of the crisis ==
=== Force Publique mutiny, racial violence and Belgian intervention ===
Despite the proclamation of independence, neither the Belgian nor the Congolese government intended the colonial social order to end immediately. The Belgian government hoped that whites might keep their position indefinitely. The Republic of the Congo was still reliant on colonial institutions like the Force Publique to function from day to day, and white technical experts, installed by the Belgians, were retained in the broad absence of suitably qualified black Congolese replacements. Many Congolese people had assumed that independence would produce tangible and immediate social change, so the retention of whites in positions of importance was widely resented.

"Independence brings changes to politicians and to civilians. But for you, nothing will be changed ... none of your new masters can change the structure of an army which, throughout its history, has been the most organized, the most victorious in Africa. The politicians have lied to you."

— Extract from Émile Janssens' speech to the Force Publique on 5 July 1960

Lieutenant-General Émile Janssens, the Belgian commander of the Force Publique, refused to see Congolese independence as marking a change in the nature of command. The day after the independence festivities, he gathered the black non-commissioned officers of his Léopoldville garrison and told them that things under his command would stay the same, summarising the point by writing "Before Independence = After Independence" on a blackboard. This message was hugely unpopular among the rank and file—many of the men had expected rapid promotions and increases in pay to accompany independence. On 5 July 1960, several units mutinied against their white officers at Camp Hardy near Thysville. The insurrection spread to Léopoldville the next day and later to garrisons across the country.

Rather than deploying Belgian troops against the mutineers as Janssens had wished, Lumumba forced him to resign and reorganised the Force Publique as the Armée Nationale Congolaise (ANC). All black soldiers were promoted by at least one rank. Victor Lundula was promoted directly from sergeant-major to major-general and commander of the ANC, replacing Janssens. At the same time, Joseph-Désiré Mobutu, an ex-sergeant-major and close personal aide of Lumumba, became Lundula's deputy as army chief of staff. The government attempted to stop the revolt—Lumumba and Kasa-Vubu intervened personally at Léopoldville and Thysville and persuaded the mutineers to lay down their arms—but in most of the country the mutiny intensified. White officers and civilians were attacked, white-owned properties were looted and white women were raped. The Belgian government became deeply concerned by the situation, particularly when white civilians began entering neighbouring countries as refugees. The international press expressed shock at the apparent sudden collapse of order in the Congo, as the world view of the Congolese situation prior to independence—due largely to Belgian propaganda—was one of peace, stability, and strong control by the authorities.

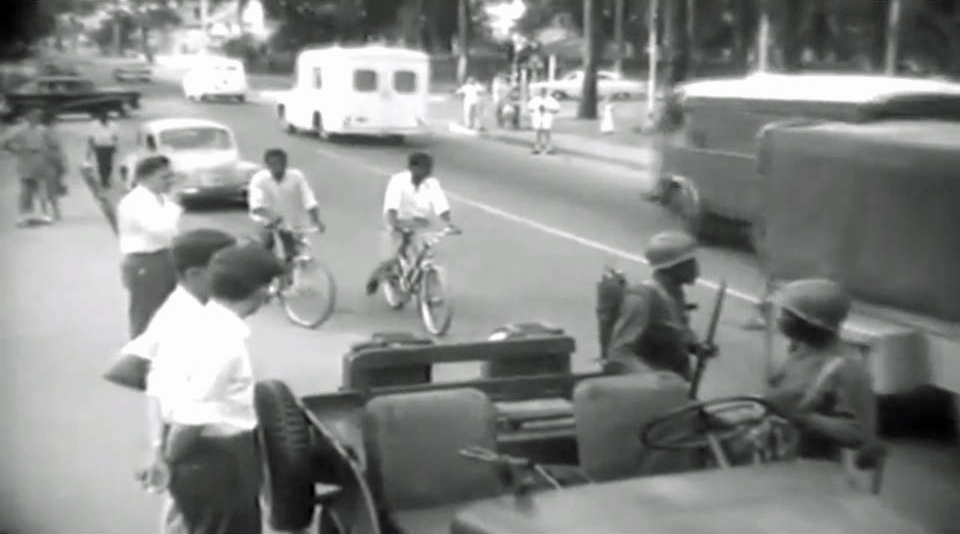
Force Publique soldiers in Léopoldville in 1960

Lumumba's stance appeared to many Belgians to justify their prior concerns about his radicalism. On 9 July, Belgium deployed paratroopers, without the Congolese state's permission, in Kabalo and elsewhere to protect fleeing white civilians. The Belgian intervention divided Lumumba and Kasa-Vubu; while Kasa-Vubu accepted the Belgian operation, Lumumba denounced it and called for "all Congolese to defend our republic against those who menace it." Meanwhile, as reported by Time, the Belgian paratroopers "beat up any stray Africans they encountered, disarmed and arrested Congolese troops" and even fired arbitrarily at Congolese citizens.

At Lumumba's request, white civilians from the port city of Matadi were evacuated by the Belgian Navy on 11 July. Belgian ships then bombarded the city; at least 19 civilians were killed. This action prompted renewed attacks on whites across the country, while Belgian forces entered other towns and cities, including Léopoldville, and clashed with Congolese troops. The Belgian government subsequently announced that it would provide for Belgian bureaucrats back in the metropole, triggering an exodus of most of the Congo's 10,000 European civil servants and leaving the administration in disarray. Engulfed by the disorder spreading throughout the country, most of the government ministries were unable to function.

=== Katanga and South Kasai secessions ===
Flag of the secessionist State of Katanga, declared in 1960

On 11 July 1960, Moïse Tshombe, the leader of CONAKAT, declared the Congo's southern province of Katanga independent as the State of Katanga, with Élisabethville as its capital and himself as president. The mineral-rich Katanga region had traditionally shared closer economic ties with the Copperbelt of neighbouring Northern Rhodesia (then part of the Central African Federation) than with the rest of the Congo, and because of its economic importance it had been administered separately from the rest of the country under the Belgians. CONAKAT furthermore contended that Katangese people were ethnically distinct from other Congolese. The secession was partly motivated by the Katangese separatists' desire to keep more of the wealth generated by the province's mining operations and to avoid sharing it with the rest of the Congo. Another major factor was what CONAKAT held to be the disintegration of law and order in the central and north-eastern Congo. Announcing Katanga's breakaway, Tshombe said "We are seceding from chaos."

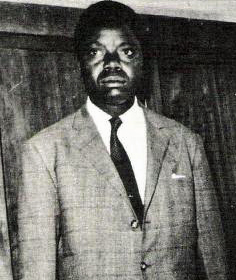
The President of secessionist Katanga, Moïse Tshombe

The major mining company in Katanga, the Union Minière du Haut Katanga (UMHK), had begun supporting CONAKAT during the latter days of Belgian rule amid worries that the MNC might seek to nationalise the company's assets after independence. UMHK was largely owned by the Société Générale de Belgique, a prominent holding company based in Brussels that had close ties to the Belgian government. Encouraged by the UMHK, the Belgian government provided military support to Katanga and ordered its civil servants in the region to remain in their posts. Tshombe also recruited mercenaries, mainly whites from South Africa and the Rhodesias, to supplement and command Katangese troops. Although supported by the Belgians, Katanga never received formal diplomatic recognition from any country. The Katangese secession highlighted the "fundamental weakness" of the central government in Léopoldville, which had been the chief advocate of a unified state.

Less than a month after the Katangese secession, on 8 August, a section of Kasai Province situated slightly to the north of Katanga also declared its autonomy from the central government as the Mining State of South Kasai (Sud-Kasaï) based around the city of Bakwanga. South Kasai was much smaller than Katanga, but was also a mining region. It was largely populated by the Luba ethnic group, and its president, Albert Kalonji, claimed that the secession was largely sparked by persecution of the Luba in the rest of the Congo. The South Kasai government was supported by Forminière, another Belgian mining company, which received concessions from the new state in return for financial support. Without control over Katanga and South Kasai, the central government was deprived of approximately 40 percent of its revenues.

=== Foreign reaction and UN intervention ===
Disquiet about Belgium's support for the secessionist states led to calls within the United Nations (UN) to remove all Belgian troops from the country. The Secretary General of the UN, Dag Hammarskjöld, believed that the crisis would provide the organisation with a chance to demonstrate its potential as a major peacekeeping force and encouraged the sending of a multinational contingent of peacekeepers to the Congo under UN command. On 14 July, the UN Security Council adopted Resolution 143, calling for total Belgian withdrawal from the Congo and their replacement with a UN-commanded force.

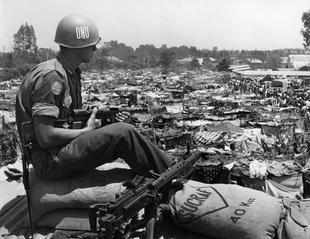
A Swedish peacekeeping soldier in the Congo. The UN deployed troops from a variety of nations during ONUC.

The arrival of the United Nations Operation in the Congo (ONUC) was initially welcomed by Lumumba and the central government who believed the UN would help suppress the secessionist states. The first UN troops arrived with the USAF's assistance on 15 July 1960. ONUC's initial mandate, however, only covered the maintenance of law and order. Viewing the secessions as an internal political matter, Hammarskjöld refused to use UN troops to assist the central Congolese government against them; he argued that doing so would represent a loss of impartiality and breach Congolese sovereignty. Lumumba also sought the assistance of the United States government of Dwight D. Eisenhower, which refused to provide unilateral military support. Frustrated, he turned to the Soviet Union, which agreed to provide weapons, logistical and material support. Around 1,000 Soviet military advisors soon landed in the Congo. Lumumba's actions distanced him from the rest of the government, especially Kasa-Vubu, who feared the implications of Soviet intervention. The Americans also feared that a Soviet-aligned Congo could form the basis of a major expansion of communism into central Africa.

With Soviet support, 2,000 ANC troops launched a major offensive against South Kasai. The attack was extremely successful, but during the course of the offensive, the ANC became involved in infighting between the Luba and Bena Lulua ethnic groups. and perpetrated a number of large massacres of Luba civilians. Around 3,000 were killed. The violence of the advance caused an exodus of thousands of Luba civilians who fled their homes to escape the fighting.

The involvement of the Soviet Union alarmed the United States. The American government under Eisenhower, in line with Belgian criticism, had long believed that Lumumba was a communist and that the Congo could be on track to become a strategically placed Soviet client state. In August 1960, Central Intelligence Agency (CIA) agents in the region reported to their agency that "Congo [is] experiencing [a] classic communist ... takeover" and warned that the Congo might follow the same path as Cuba.

== Political disintegration ==
=== Central government split and first Mobutu coup ===
Mobutu at press conference announcing bloodless coup

Lumumba's appeal for Soviet support split the government and led to mounting pressure from Western countries to remove him from power. In addition, both Tshombe and Kalonji appealed to Kasa-Vubu, whom they believed to be both a moderate and federalist, to move against Lumumba's centralism and resolve the secession issue. Meanwhile, Mobutu took effective control of the army, routing foreign aid and promotions to specific units and officers to secure their allegiance.

On 5 September 1960, Kasa-Vubu announced on national radio that he had unilaterally dismissed Lumumba, using the massacres in South Kasai as a pretext and with the promise of American backing. Andrew Cordier, the American UN representative in the Congo, used his position to block communications by Lumumba's faction and to prevent a coordinated MNC-L reaction to the news. Both chambers of Parliament, however, supported Lumumba and denounced Kasa-Vubu's action. Lumumba attempted to dismiss Kasa-Vubu from his position, but could not get support for this, precipitating a constitutional crisis.

Ostensibly in order to resolve the deadlock, Joseph-Désiré Mobutu launched a bloodless coup and replaced both Kasa-Vubu and Lumumba with a College of Commissionaires-General (Collège des Commissaires-généraux) consisting of a panel of university graduates, led by Justin Bomboko. Soviet military advisors were ordered to leave. Allegedly, the coup was intended to force the politicians to take a cooling-off period before they could resume control. In practice, however, Mobutu sided with Kasa-Vubu against Lumumba, who was placed under house arrest, guarded by Ghanaian UN troops and an outer ring of ANC soldiers. Kasa-Vubu was re-appointed President by Mobutu in February 1961. From the coup onwards, Mobutu was able to exert considerable power in Congolese politics behind the scenes.

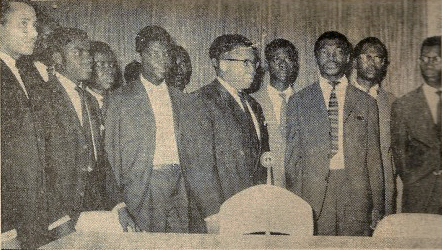
Kasa-Vubu with the members of the College of Commissionaires-General, installed by Mobutu in September 1960

Following Kasa-Vubu's reinstatement, there was an attempted rapprochement between the Congolese factions. Tshombe began negotiations for the end of the secession and the formation of a confederal Congo. Although a compromise agreement was reached, it was prevented from taking effect as negotiations broke down amid personal animosity between Kasa-Vubu and Tshombe. An attempted reconciliation in July 1961 led to the formation of a new government, led by Cyrille Adoula, which brought together deputies from both Lumumbist and South Kasai factions but failed to bring a reconciliation with Katanga.

Members of the MNC-L fled to Stanleyville where, led by Antoine Gizenga, they formed a rebel government in November 1960 in opposition to the central government in Léopoldville. The Gizenga government was recognised by some states, including the Soviet Union and China, as the official government of the Congo and could call on an approximate 5,500 troops compared to the central government's 7,000. Faced with UN pressure, the Gizenga government however collapsed in January 1962 after Gizenga was arrested.

=== Killing of Lumumba ===
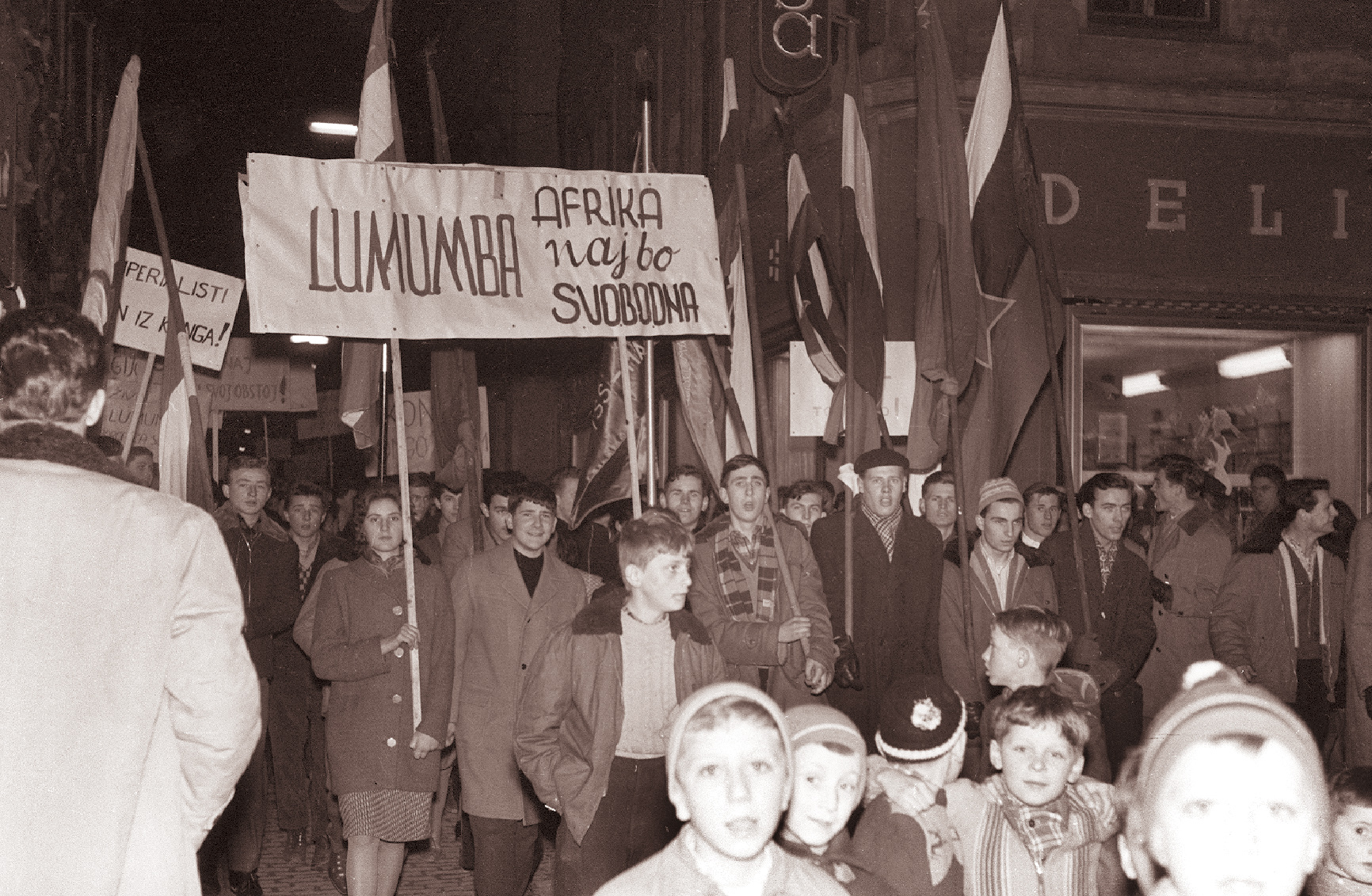
Pro-Lumumba demonstrators in Maribor, Yugoslavia in February 1961

Lumumba escaped house arrest and fled eastwards towards Stanleyville where he believed he could rally support. Pursued by troops loyal to Mobutu, he was captured at Lodi on 1 December 1960 and flown back to Léopoldville with his hands bound. Despite UN appeals to Kasa-Vubu for due legal process, the Soviet Union denounced the UN as responsible for the arrest and demanded his release. A meeting of the UN Security Council was called on 7 December 1960 to consider Soviet demands that the UN seek Lumumba's immediate release, his restoration to the head of the Congolese government and the disarming of Mobutu's forces. The pro-Lumumba resolution was defeated on 14 December 1960 by a vote of 8–2. Still in captivity, Lumumba was tortured and transported to Thysville and later to Katanga, where he was handed over to forces loyal to Tshombe. On 17 January 1961, Lumumba was executed by Katangese troops near Élisabethville with assistance from Belgian officers and personnel.

Before the news broke, there was confusion as to what exactly had happened, with CIA officer Larry Devlin, the Chief of Station at Leopoldville saying that “several versions of Lumumba’s death were circulating in the Katangan capital.” None of these rumours could be confirmed for a time.

When news of the execution was eventually released on 13 February, it provoked international outrage. The Belgian Embassy in Yugoslavia was attacked by protesters in Belgrade, and violent demonstrations occurred in London and New York. Shortly thereafter seven Lumumbists, including the first President of Orientale Province, Jean-Pierre Finant, were executed in South Kasai for "crimes against the Luba nation". Gizenga's soldiers then shot 15 political prisoners in retaliation, including Lumumba's dissident Minister of Communications, Alphonse Songolo.

Devlin is of the opinion that Lumumba’s death did not result in any resolution to the Congo Crisis, but according to him in the days following the announcement of his death there was a decrease in activity across the entirety of the Republic.

=== United Nations escalation and the end of the Katangese secession ===
Since its initial resolution of July 1960, the UN had issued further resolutions calling for the total withdrawal of Belgian and mercenary forces from Katanga in progressively stronger terms. By 1961, ONUC comprised nearly 20,000 men. Although their mandate prevented them from taking sides, ONUC had a mandate to arrest foreign mercenaries wherever they encountered them. In September 1961, an attempt to detain a group of Katangese mercenaries without violence during Operation Morthor went wrong and turned into a fire-fight. (Note: A similar mission, Operation Rum Punch, had taken place a few weeks earlier and had resulted in the successful arrest of around 40 mercenaries without violence.) ONUC's claim to impartiality was undermined in mid-September when a company of Irish UN troops were captured by numerically superior Katangese forces following a six-day siege in Jadotville. (Note: The Irish were compelled to surrender when their ammunition and supplies ran out. None were killed. The Katangese, though victorious, suffered hundreds of casualties.) Katanga proceeded to hold the Irishmen as prisoners of war, a development that deeply embarrassed the UN mission and its proponents.

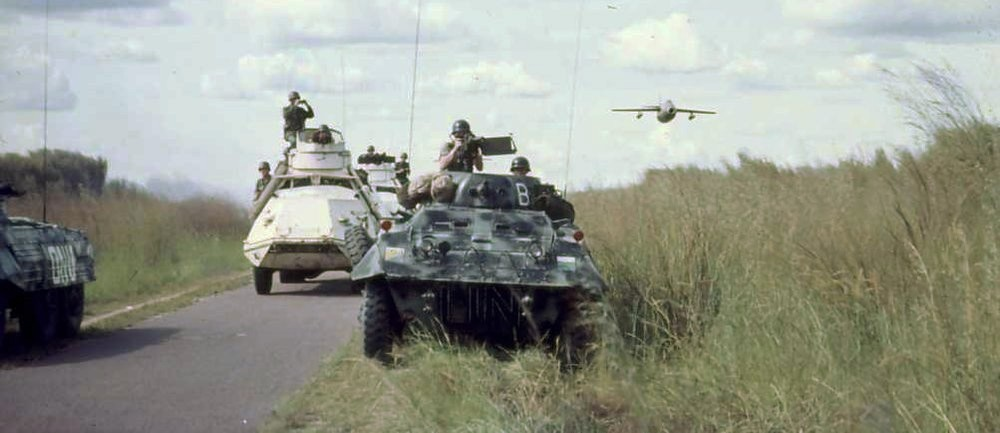
Swedish ONUC troops advancing upon the town of Kamina

On 18 September 1961, Hammarskjöld flew to Ndola, just across the border in Northern Rhodesia, to attempt to broker a cease-fire between UN and Katangese forces. His aircraft crashed before landing at Ndola Airport, killing him and everybody else on board. In stark contrast to Hammarskjöld's attempts to pursue a moderate policy in the Congo, his successor U Thant supported a more radical policy of direct involvement in the conflict. Katanga released the captured Irish soldiers in mid-October as part of a cease-fire deal in which ONUC agreed to pull its troops back—a propaganda coup for Tshombe. Restated American support for the UN mission, and the murder of ten Italian UN pilots in Port-Empain in November 1961, strengthened international demands to resolve the situation. In April 1962, UN troops occupied South Kasai. On the night of 29/30 September 1962, South Kasai military commanders launched a coup d'état in Bakwanga against the Kalonjist regime. On 5 October 1962, central government troops again arrived in Bakwanga to support the mutineers and help suppress the last Kalonjist loyalists, marking the end of South Kasai's secession.

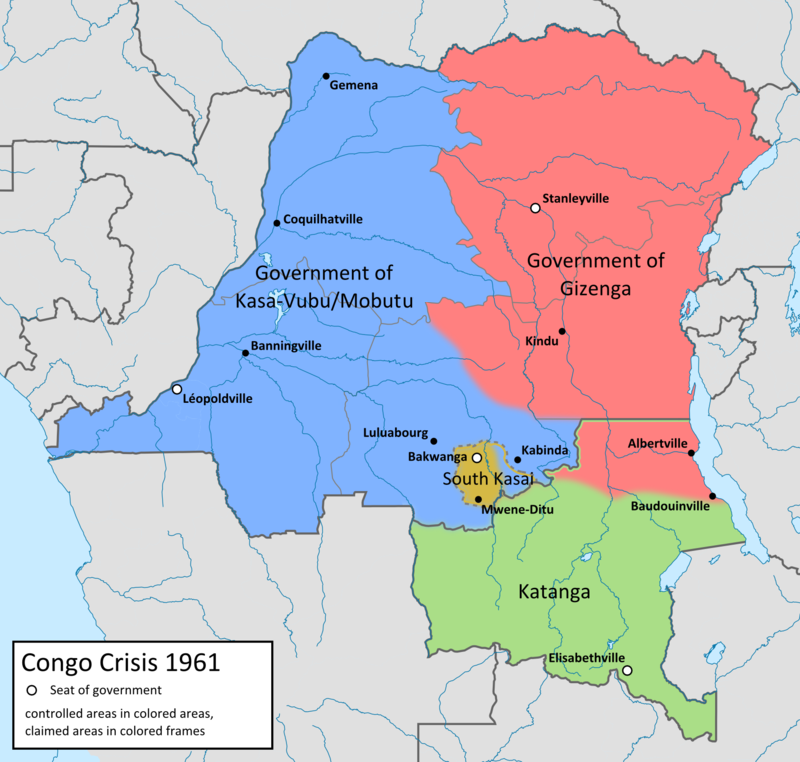
Map of the factions in the Congo in 1961

Resolution 169, issued in November 1961, called for ONUC to respond to the deteriorating human rights situation and prevent the outbreak of full-scale civil war. The resolution "completely rejected" Katanga's claim to statehood and authorised ONUC troops to use all necessary force to "assist the Central Government of the Congo in the restoration and maintenance of law and order". The Katangese made further provocations and, in response, ONUC launched Operation Unokat to dismantle Katangese roadblocks and seize strategic positions around Élisabethville. Faced with international pressure, Tshombe signed the Kitona Declaration in December 1961 in which he agreed in principle to accept the authority of the central government and state constitution and to abandon any claim to Katangese independence. Following the declaration, however, talks between Tshombe and Adoula reached a deadlock, while Katangese forces continued to harass UN troops. Diminishing support and Belgium's increasing reluctance to support Katanga demonstrated that the state could not survive indefinitely. On 11 December 1962, Belgian foreign minister Paul-Henri Spaak declared that the Belgian government would support the UN or the central Congolese government should they attempt to end the Katangese secession through force.

On 24 December 1962, UN troops and the Katangese Gendarmerie clashed near Élisabethville and fighting broke out. After attempts to reach a ceasefire failed, UN troops launched Operation Grandslam and occupied Élisabethville, prompting Tshombe to leave the country. A ceasefire was agreed upon soon thereafter. Indian UN troops, exceeding their orders, then occupied Jadotville, preventing Katangese loyalists from regrouping. Gradually, the UN overran the rest of the Katanga and, on 17 January 1963, Tshombe surrendered his final stronghold of Kolwezi, effectively ending the Katangese secession.

=== Attempted political reconciliation ===
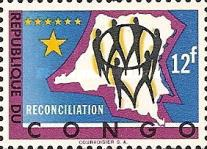
A 1963 postage stamp commemorating the "reconciliation" of the political factions in the Congo after the end of the Katangese secession

Following the end of the Katanga secession, political negotiations began to reconcile the disparate political factions. The negotiations coincided with the formation of an émigré political group, the Conseil National de Libération (CNL), by dissident Lumumbists and others in neighbouring Congo-Brazzaville. The negotiations culminated in the creation of a new, revised constitution, known as the Luluabourg Constitution, after the city in which it was written, to create a compromise balance of power. The new constitution increased the power of the presidency, ending the system of joint consultation between president and prime minister, and appeased federalists by increasing the number of provinces from six to 21 while increasing their autonomy. The constitution also changed the name of the state from the Republic of the Congo to Democratic Republic of the Congo. It was ratified in a constitutional referendum in June 1964 and Parliament was dissolved to await new elections. Kasa-Vubu appointed Tshombe, the exiled Katangese leader, as interim prime minister. Although personally capable, and supported as an anti-communist by Western powers, Tshombe was denounced by other African leaders such as King Hassan II of Morocco as an imperialist puppet for his role in the Katangese secession.

Under Tshombe's interim government, fresh elections were scheduled for 30 March and the rebellion broke out in the central and eastern parts of the Congo.

== Kwilu and Simba rebellions ==
The period of political crisis had led to widespread disenchantment with the central government brought in by independence. Demands for a "second independence" from kleptocracy and political infighting in the capital grew. The "second independence" slogan was taken up by Maoist-inspired Congolese revolutionaries, including Pierre Mulele who had served in the Lumumba government. The political instability of the Congo helped to channel wider discontentment into outright revolt.

Map showing the territory controlled by the Simba (green) and Kwilu (yellow) rebels, 1964

Disruption in the rural Congo begun with agitation by Lumumbists, led by Mulele, among the Pende and Mbundu peoples. By the end of 1963, there was unrest in regions of the central and eastern Congo. The Kwilu Rebellion broke out on 16 January 1964 in the cities of Idiofa and Gungu in Kwilu Province. Further disruption and uprisings then spread to Kivu in the east and later to Albertville, sparking further insurrection elsewhere in the Congo and the outbreak of the larger Simba Rebellion. The rebels began to expand their territory and rapidly advance northwards, capturing Port-Émpain, Stanleyville, Paulis and Lisala between July and August.

The rebels, who called themselves "Simbas" (from the Kiswahili word for "lion"), had a populist but vague ideology, loosely based on communism, which prioritised equality and aimed to increase overall wealth. Most of the active revolutionaries were young men who hoped that the rebellion would provide them with opportunities which the government had not. The Simbas used magic to initiate members and believed that, by following a moral code, they could become invulnerable to bullets. Magic was also very important to the rebels who also made extensive use of witchcraft to protect themselves and also demoralise their ANC opponents. As they advanced, the rebels perpetrated numerous massacres in the territory they captured in order to remove political opposition and terrorise the population. About 1,000 to 2,000 Westernized Congolese were murdered in Stanleyville alone, while the rebels initially left Whites and foreigners mostly alone. ONUC was in the process of withdrawing when the rebellions started and had only 5,500 personnel, most of whom were deployed in the eastern part of the country and stranded by the conflict. Straggling Western missionaries retreated to their respective embassies, which in turn requested UN assistance. A small force of peacekeepers was assembled and subsequently dispatched to the Kwilu region to retrieve fleeing missionaries. Rescue operations continued throughout March and April and resulted in the successful recovery of over 100 missionaries.

The rebels founded a state, the People's Republic of the Congo (République populaire du Congo), with its capital at Stanleyville and Christophe Gbenye as president. The new state was supported by the Soviet Union and China, which supplied it with arms, as did various African states, notably Tanzania. It was also supported by Cuba, which sent a team of over 100 advisors led by Che Guevara to advise the Simbas on tactics and doctrine. The Simba rebellion coincided with a wide escalation of the Cold War amid the Gulf of Tonkin incident and it has been speculated that, had the rebellion not been rapidly defeated, a full-scale American military intervention could have occurred as in Vietnam.

=== Suppression and Belgian and American intervention ===
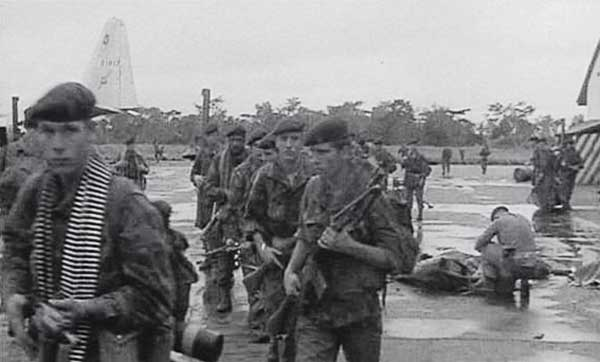
Belgian paratroopers on Stanleyville airfield shortly after Operation Dragon Rouge

After its early string of successes, the Simba rebellion began to encounter local resistance as it encroached on areas outside of the MNC-L's old domain. The People's Republic also suffered from a lack of coherent social and economic policy, contributing to an inability to administer its own territory. From the end of August 1964 the rebels began to lose ground to the ANC. Albertville and Lisala were recaptured in late August and early September. Tshombe, backed by Mobutu, recalled many of his former mercenaries from the Katangese secession to oppose the Simba. Mercenaries, led by "Mad Mike" Hoare and mostly whites from central and southern Africa, were formed into a unit known as 5 Commando ANC. The unit served as the spearhead of the ANC and were involved in unsanctioned killing, torture, looting and rapes in recaptured rebel areas. The mercenaries were also materially supported by the CIA.

In November 1964, the Simbas rounded up the remaining white population of Stanleyville and its environs. The whites were held hostage in the Victoria Hotel in the city to use as bargaining tools with the ANC. In order to recover the hostages, Belgian parachute troops were flown to the Congo in American aircraft to intervene. On 24 November, as part of Operation Dragon Rouge, Belgian paratroopers landed in Stanleyville and quickly secured the hostages. In total, around 70 hostages and 1,000 Congolese civilians were killed but the vast majority were evacuated. The Belgian troops were only under orders to liberate the hostages, rather than push the Simbas out of the city, but the attack nevertheless "broke the back of the eastern insurrection, which never recovered." The Simba leadership went into exile in disarray and severe disagreement; Gbenye was shot in the shoulder by his general after dismissing him. Meanwhile, the Belgian paratroopers and the civilians returned to their country. In the aftermath of the intervention, Belgium itself was publicly accused of neocolonialism.

As a result of the intervention, Tshombe lost the support of Kasa-Vubu and Mobutu and was dismissed from his post as prime minister in October 1965. Soon after Dragon Rouge, ANC and mercenary troops captured Stanleyville, putting an end to the Simba rebellion. The Simba rebels executed 20,000 Congolese and 392 Western hostages, including 268 Belgians, during the rebellion. Tens of thousands of people were killed in total during the suppression of the Simbas. Pockets of Simba resistance continued to hold out in the eastern Congo, most notably in South Kivu, where Laurent-Désiré Kabila led a Maoist cross-border insurgency which lasted until the 1980s.

== Second Mobutu coup d'état ==
In the scheduled March 1965 elections, Tshombe's Convention Nationale Congolaise (CONACO) won a large majority of the seats, but a large part of his party soon defected to form the new Front Démocratique Congolais (FDC), making the overall result unclear as CONACO controlled the Chamber of Deputies while the FDC controlled the Senate. Kasa-Vubu, attempting to use the situation to block Tshombe, appointed an anti-Tshombe leader, Évariste Kimba of the FDC, to be prime minister-designate in November 1965, but the largely pro-Tshombe Parliament refused to ratify the appointment. Instead of seeking a compromise candidate, Kasa-Vubu again unilaterally declared Kimba to be prime minister, which was again rejected, creating a political deadlock. With the government in near-paralysis, Mobutu seized power in a bloodless coup, ostensibly to stop the impasse, on 25 November 1965.

Under the auspices of a régime d'exception (the equivalent of a state of emergency), Mobutu assumed sweeping, almost absolute, power for five years, after which, he claimed, democracy would be restored. Mobutu's coup, which promised both economic and political stability, was supported by the United States and other Western governments, and his rule initially met widespread popularity. He increasingly took other powers, abolishing the post of prime minister, in 1966, and dissolving Parliament, in 1967.

== Aftermath and legacy ==
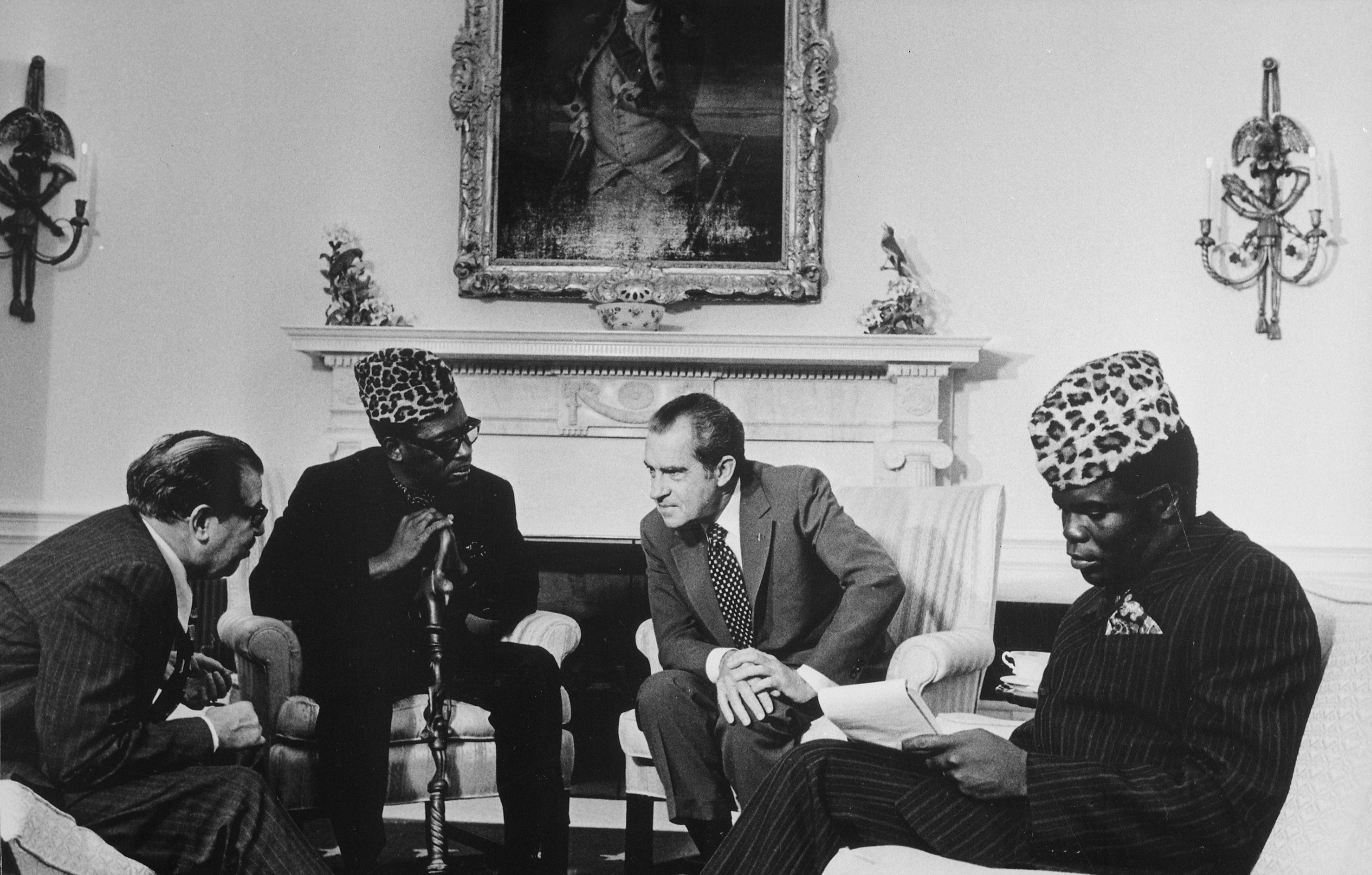
Mobutu with Richard Nixon at the White House in 1973

Once established as the sole source of political power, Mobutu gradually consolidated his control in the Congo. The number of provinces was reduced, and their autonomy curtailed, resulting in a highly centralised state. Mobutu increasingly placed his supporters in the remaining positions of importance. In 1967, to demonstrate his legitimacy, he created a party, the Mouvement Populaire de la Révolution (MPR), which, until 1990, was the nation's only legal political party under Mobutu's new constitution. In 1971, the state was renamed Zaire and efforts were made to remove all colonial influences. He also nationalised the remaining foreign-owned economic assets in the country, including the L'Union minière du Haut Katanga (UMHK) which became Gécamines. Despite initial successes, by the time of its disestablishment Mobutu's rule was characterised by widespread cronyism, corruption and economic mismanagement.

In the years after the Congo Crisis, Mobutu was able to remove many opposition figures from the crisis who might threaten his control. Tshombe was sent into a second exile in 1965 after being accused of treason. Between 1966 and 1967, two mutinies in Stanleyville broke out involving up to 800 Katangese gendarmes and former mercenaries of Tshombe. The mutinies were eventually repressed. In 1967, Tshombe was sentenced to death in absentia and the same year was kidnapped in an aeroplane hijacking and held under arrest in Algeria. His death in 1969, allegedly from natural causes, has provoked speculation that the Mobutu government may have been involved. Mulele was also lured back to the Congo from exile by the promise of an amnesty but was tortured and murdered.

=== Political legacy ===
The issues of federalism, ethnicity in politics and state centralisation were not resolved by the crisis and partly contributed to a decline in support for the concept of the state among Congolese people. Mobutu was strongly in favour of centralisation and one of his first acts, in 1965, was to reunify provinces and abolish much of their independent legislative capacity. Subsequent loss of faith in central government is one of the reasons that the Congo has been labeled as a failed state, and has contributed violence by factions advocating ethnic and localised federalism. (Note: Separatist movements in Katanga have continued since the end of the Crisis. In the 1970s, two conflicts, known as Shaba I and II, led by the Front National pour la Libération du Congo (FNLC), attempted to use the chaos of the neighbouring Angolan Civil War to secede. After 2000, a further secessionist movement, led by the warlord Gédéon Kyungu Mutanga and his militia Kata Katanga ("Secede Katanga"), have attempted to defeat government forces and proclaim regional independence.) Local insurgencies continued in the eastern Congo into the 1980s and left a legacy of instability along the Congo's eastern borders. Laurent-Désiré Kabila, who had led an anti-Mobutu insurrection during the crisis, succeeded in deposing Mobutu. in 1997, and becoming president of the restored Democratic Republic of the Congo. He was succeeded by his son, Joseph Kabila. Following the fall of Mobutu, Antoine Gizenga founded a political party, the Parti Lumumbiste Unifié (PALU), and was appointed prime minister following the 2006 general election.

The Congo Crisis holds great significance in the collective memory of the Congolese people. In particular, Lumumba's murder is viewed in the context of the memory as a symbolic moment in which the Congo lost its dignity in the international realm and the ability to determine its future, which has since been controlled by the West. Many Congolese view the problems of the crisis as unresolved, and believe that the Congo's self-determination has yet to be secured from Western machinations. The latter notion has largely shaped the political aspirations of a substantial number of Congolese.

=== Historiography and historical controversy ===
The Congo Crisis is usually portrayed in historiography as a time of intense disorder and disarray; there is wide consensus that the processes around Congolese independence were a calamity. This interpretation often juxtaposes the crisis with the supposed stability of the Congo under Belgian rule before 1960 and under Mobutu's regime after 1965. In Belgium, allegations of Belgian complicity in the killing of Lumumba led to a state-backed inquiry and subsequent official apology in 2001 for "moral responsibility", though not direct involvement, in the assassination. The multi-volume official history of the American foreign service, Foreign Relations of the United States, was accused by academic David N. Gibbs of deliberately diminishing American involvement.

== International importance ==
The turmoil of the Congo Crisis destabilised Central Africa and helped to ignite the Portuguese Colonial War, especially the war of independence in neighbouring Angola. Angolan nationalists had long had close ties with the Congo where many had lived as exiles. The União dos Povos de Angola (UPA), (Note: The UPA was renamed the Frente Nacional de Libertação de Angola, or FNLA, in 1962.) an Angolan nationalist organisation which drew support from the Angolan Bakongo, was supporting ABAKO politicians who had hopes of rebuilding the Kingdom of Kongo, altering the borders established during the colonial period. Believing that the independence of Congo was the first stage in this process, the UPA launched the Baixa de Cassanje revolt in 1961, igniting the conflict in Angola that would last until 1974. The Congolese, later Zairian, governments continued to provide support to Angolan rebels and even participated directly in the subsequent Angolan Civil War.

The Congo crisis revealed in one fell swoop the true nature of the powers which shaped large parts of the post-war world. The crisis showed in actual practice the true nature, not only of the former colonial powers, but also of the United Nations, of the recently independent countries united in what was called the Afro-Asian bloc, as well as of Moscow

— Sociologist Ludo De Witte

The crisis caused the newly independent African states to reconsider their allegiances and internal ties. In particular, it led to the division of African states into factions. Moderate-leaning states joined the Brazzaville Group, which called for a degree of unity between Francophone African states and the maintenance of ties with France. Radical states joined the Casablanca Group which called for a Pan-African federation. The chaotic violence of the crisis and the fate of the country's whites, many of whom entered Northern and Southern Rhodesia as refugees, contributed to the widespread belief among whites there that black nationalist politicians were not ready to govern, and prompted fears that immediate majority rule in Rhodesia might lead to a similar situation. Operation Refugee, a mobilisation of white Rhodesians to assist the displaced Congolese whites, was organised in response to the crisis. After negotiations with Britain repeatedly broke down, Southern Rhodesia's predominantly white government declared independence unilaterally in 1965. It also drove European expatriates in the Central African Republic to support the increasing authoritarianism of David Dacko's regime as a means of protecting their interests. The disorder of Congolese independence was frequently invoked in diplomatic discussions of Sub-Saharan Africa throughout the remainder of the 1960s.

The Katangese secession would prove to be politically influential in Africa. During the Chadian Civil War between 1965 and 1979, the Front de Libération Nationale du Tchad (FROLINAT) explicitly rejected secessionism in its bid to remove the southern-backed government of François Tombalbaye following the experience of the Katanga secession, officially stating that "there will be no Katanga in Chad". In the Nigerian Civil War, between 1967 and 1970, the ethnically Igbo region of Biafra seceded from Nigeria, which it accused of privileging the interests of northern ethnic groups and discriminating against the Igbo. The secessions of Biafra and Katanga have frequently been compared in academic writing. Unlike Katanga, Biafra achieved limited official international recognition and rejected the support of Western multinational companies involved in the local oil industry. Biafra was defeated in 1970 and re-integrated into Nigeria.

== See also ==
- First Congo War (1996–1997)
- History of the Democratic Republic of the Congo
- "Indépendance Cha Cha" – a 1960 song by Le Grand Kallé commemorating Congolese independence
- The Poisonwood Bible (1998) – a novel by Barbara Kingsolver set during the crisis
- Second Congo War (1998–2003)
- Wind of Change (speech) by Harold Macmillan, 1960
- Year of Africa (1960)
- List of Swedish peacekeeping missions

== Notes and references ==
=== General and cited references ===
- "1961: Lumumba Rally Clashes with UK Police". On This Day. BBC News. 19 February 2008.
- "Belgium link in Lumumba death". BBC News. 16 November 2001.
- Boulden, Jane (2001). Peace Enforcement: The United Nations Experience in Congo, Somalia, and Bosnia (1st ed.). Westport, Conn.: Praeger. ISBN 0275969061.
- Borstelmann, Thomas (1993). Apartheid, Colonialism, and the Cold War: the United States and Southern Africa, 1945–1952. New York: Oxford University Press. ISBN 0195079426.
- Braeckman, Colette (2 January 2007). "Antoine Gizenga ou la revanche de l'histoire". Le Soir.
- Dietrich, Christopher R. W. (2013). "'The Sustenance of Salisbury' in the era of Decolonization: The Portuguese Politics of Neutrality and the Rhodesian Oil Embargo, 1965–7". The International History Review. 35 (2): 235–255. doi:10.1080/07075332.2012.742447. S2CID 153867936.
- Dorn, A. Walter (2016). Air Power in UN Operations: Wings for Peace. Military Strategy and Operational Art. Routledge. ISBN 9781317183396.
- Tom Lodge; Denis Kadima; David Pottie, eds. (2002). "Democratic Republic of Congo". Compendium of Elections in Southern Africa. Electoral Institute for Sustainable Democracy in Africa (EISA).
  - EISA (2002a). "DRC: Background to the 1965 election". In Tom Lodge, Denis Kadima & David Pottie (2002), pp. 65–66.
  - EISA (2002b). "DRC: Constitutional Crisis between Kasavubu and Tshombe". In Tom Lodge, Denis Kadima & David Pottie (2002), pp. 67–68.
- Fox, Renee C.; De Craemer, Willy; Ribeaucourt, Jean-Marie (October 1965). ""The Second Independence": A Case Study of the Kwilu Rebellion in the Congo". Comparative Studies in Society and History. 8 (1): 78–109. doi:10.1017/s0010417500003911. JSTOR 177537. S2CID 145504330.
- Freund, Bill (1998). The Making of Contemporary Africa: The Development of African Society since 1800 (2nd ed.). Basingstoke: Palgrave-Macmillan. ISBN 9780333698723.
- Gendebien, Paul-Henry (1967). L'Intervention Des Nations Unies Au Congo. 1960–1964. Berlin: Walter de Gruyter. ISBN 9783111137872.
- Gibbs, David N. (1991). The Political Economy of Third World Intervention: Mines, Money, and U.S. Policy in the Congo Crisis. University of Chicago Press. ISBN 9780226290713.
- Gibbs, David N. (July 1996). "Misrepresenting the Congo Crisis". African Affairs. 95 (380): 453–9. doi:10.1093/oxfordjournals.afraf.a007743. JSTOR 723578.
- Gleijeses, Piero (April 1994). ""Flee! The White Giants Are Coming!": The United States, the Mercenaries, and the Congo, 1964–65" (PDF). Diplomatic History. 18 (2): 207–37. doi:10.1111/j.1467-7709.1994.tb00611.x. ISSN 0145-2096. Archived from the original (PDF) on 21 January 2018.
- De Goede, Meike J. (December 2015). "'Mundele, it is because of you' History, Identity and the Meaning of Democracy in the Congo". The Journal of Modern African Studies. 53 (4): 583–609. doi:10.1017/S0022278X15000786. S2CID 232343835. ProQuest 1729455898.
- Gondola, Didier (2002). The History of Congo. Westport, Connecticut: Greenwood. ISBN 9780313316968.
- Haskin, Jeanne M. (2005). The Tragic State of the Congo: From Decolonization to Dictatorship. New York: Algora Publishing. ISBN 0875864163.
- Horn, Bernd; Harris, Stephen John, eds. (2001). Warrior Chiefs: Perspectives on Senior Canadian Military Leaders (illustrated ed.). Dundurn. ISBN 9781550023510.
- Iandolo, Alessandro (14 May 2012). "The rise and fall of the 'Soviet Model of Development' in West Africa, 1957–64" (PDF). Cold War History. 12 (4): 683–704. doi:10.1080/14682745.2011.649255. S2CID 154159207. Archived (PDF) from the original on 19 November 2023.
- Jullien, Maud (11 August 2013). "Katanga: Fighting for DR Congo's cash cow to secede". BBC Africa. BBC.
- Kalck, Pierre (1971). Central African Republic: A Failure in De-Colonisation. translated by Barbara Thomson. London: Pall Mall Press. ISBN 0-269-02801-3.
- Marmon, Brooks (4 August 2021). "Operation Refugee: the Congo Crisis and the end of humanitarian imperialism in Southern Rhodesia, 1960" (PDF). Cold War History. 22 (2): 131–152. doi:10.1080/14682745.2021.1933950. hdl:2263/84772. S2CID 238771239. Archived (PDF) from the original on 19 November 2023.
- Meredith, Martin (1984). The First Dance of Freedom: Black Africa in the Postwar Era (1st US ed.). London: Hamish Hamilton. ISBN 9780241113400.
- Mockler, Anthony (1986). "Soldiers of Fortune: 5 Commando, the Congo 1964–65". Orbis. Vol. 1, no. 6. The Elite. pp. 116–120. ISSN 0030-4387.
- Mwakikagile, Godfrey (2014). Statecraft and Nation Building in Africa: A Post-colonial Study. Dar es Salaam: New Africa Press. ISBN 9789987160396.
- Nugent, Paul (2004). Africa since Independence: A Comparative History. New York: Palgrave-MacMillan. ISBN 9780333682739 – via the Internet Archive.
- Nzongola-Ntalaja, Georges (2007). The Congo, From Leopold to Kabila: A People's History (3rd ed.). New York: Palgrave. ISBN 9781842770535.
- Olivier, Lanotte (6 April 2010). "Chronology of the Democratic Republic of Congo/Zaire (1960–1997)". Mass Violence and Resistance – Research Network. Paris Institute of Political Studies. Archived from the original on 12 July 2021.
- Packham, Eric S. (1996). Freedom and Anarchy (illustrated ed.). Nova Publishers. ISBN 9781560722328.
- Pakenham, Thomas (1992). The Scramble for Africa: the White Man's Conquest of the Dark Continent from 1876 to 1912 (13th ed.). London: Abacus. ISBN 9780349104492.
- Renton, David; Seddon, David; Zeilig, Leo (2007). The Congo: Plunder and Resistance. London: Zed Books. ISBN 9781842774854.
- Stanard, Matthew G. (2018). "Revisiting Bula Matari and the Congo Crisis: Successes and Anxieties in Belgium's Late Colonial State". The Journal of Imperial and Commonwealth History. 46 (1): 144–168. doi:10.1080/03086534.2017.1390895. S2CID 159876371.
- Struelens, Michel (1978). The United Nations in the Congo, Or O.N.U.C., and International Politics (1st ed.). Brussels: Max Arnold. OCLC 2618699.
- Stapleton, Tim (2017). "Refugee-warriors and other people's wars in post-colonial Africa: the experience of Rwandese and South African military exiles (1960–94)". In Falola, Toyin; Mbah, Emmanuel (eds.). Dissent, Protest and Dispute in Africa. New York City: Routledge. ISBN 978-1-138-22003-4. Archived from the original on 1 March 2023.
- Turner, Thomas (2007). The Congo Wars: Conflict, Myth, and Reality (2nd ed.). London: Zed Books. ISBN 9781842776889 – via the Internet Archive.
- United Nations Security Council. "UN Resolution 169". United Nations Documents.
- Verhaegen, Benoît (1967). "Les rébellions populaires au Congo en 1964" (PDF). Cahiers d'études africaines. 7 (26): 345–59. doi:10.3406/cea.1967.3100. ISSN 0008-0055. Archived (PDF) from the original on 24 September 2015.
- Whelan, Michael (2006). The Battle of Jadotville: Irish Soldiers in Combat in the Congo 1961 (PDF). Dublin: South Dublin Libraries. ISBN 9780954766061.
- Willame, Jean-Claude (1972). Patrimonialism and Political Change in the Congo. Stanford: Stanford University Press. ISBN 0-8047-0793-6.
- De Witte, Ludo (2002). The Assassination of Lumumba (Trans. ed.). London: Verso. ISBN 1859844103.
- Wood, J. R. T. (2005). So Far and No Further! Rhodesia's Bid For Independence During the Retreat From Empire 1959–1965. Victoria, British Columbia: Trafford Publishing. ISBN 9781412049528.
- Young, Crawford (2015). Politics in Congo: Decolonization and Independence (reprint ed.). Princeton University Press. ISBN 9781400878574.
- Young, Crawford (1966). "Post-Independence Politics in the Congo". Transition (26). Indiana University Press: 34–41. doi:10.2307/2934325. JSTOR 2934325.
- Zeilig, Leo (2008). Lumumba: Africa's Lost Leader. London: Haus. ISBN 9781905791026.
