= Front Démocratique Congolais (DRC) =

- Abbreviation: FDC
- Leader: Joseph Kasa-Vubu; Victor Nendaka Bika
- Spokesperson: Cléophas Kamitatu
- Founder: Victor Nendaka Bika
- Founded: 1965
- Banned: 1966
- Merger of: Provinces Martyres other opposition groups
- Split from: Convention Nationale Congolaise
- Ideology: Big-tent; Anti-Moïse Tshombe
- Chamber (4 October 1965): 72 / 166
- Senate (4 October 1965): 59 / 132

The Front Démocratique Congolais (lit. 'Congolese Democratic Front') or FDC was a coalition formed in 1965 by Convention Nationale Congolaise dissidents and other opponents of Prime Minister Moïse Tshombe. The group was founded by Victor Nendaka Bika and held control of the Senate and the Prime Minister post until the Second Mobutu coup d'état. It supported President Joseph Kasa-Vubu.

Under President Mobutu, while political activities by parties were suspended, the FDC held positions in Léonard Mulamba's cabinet before Mobutu dissolved all parties.

== Background ==
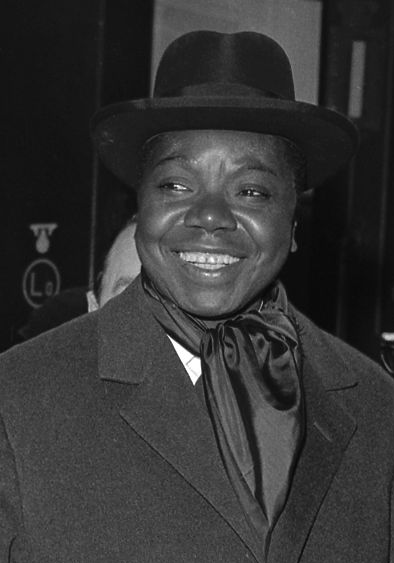
Moïse Tshombe in 1963

In 1964, a "marriage of convenience" was formed between President Joseph Kasa-Vubu and former Katangan secessionist leader Moïse Tshombe when the latter was appointed Prime Minister. This move was motivated by several factors, including the threat that Tshombe might deploy his Angola-based forces against the central government and his demonstrated ability to organize effective mercenary units needed to suppress the ongoing Simba rebellion. Kasa-Vubu intended the appointment to be a temporary expedient.

By the spring of 1965, however, this fragile alliance began to unravel as Tshombe sought to consolidate his power by organizing a well-financed nationwide political party (more accurately an electoral alliance of 49 parties/lists), the Convention Nationale Congolaise (CONACO), which threatened Kasa-Vubu as the approved Luluabourg Constitution called for parliamentary elections and, later, a presidential election. This "coalition of circumstance", led by a "politician of indisputable charm and skill" and benefiting from access to the national treasury, was able to secure 122 seats in the 1965 Democratic Republic of the Congo general election. Many politicians joined the coalition purely as a means to get elected.

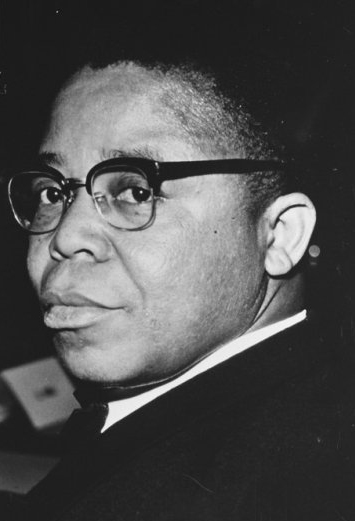
Kasa-Vubu in 1960

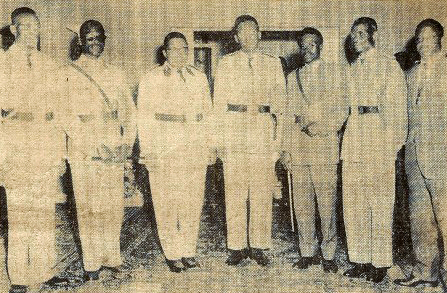
Nendaka in 1961 (far right)

While Kasa-Vubu's party, the AKABO, only secured 10 seats, he still had the advantage of the prerogatives of being president, and the fact that the conditions that had prompted him to appoint Tshombe had largely been resolved: the Simbas had effectively been crushed, the Katangan troops had successfully been integrated into the arny under General Joseph Mobutu's leadership, and the mercenaries had been effectively brought into the picture.

The leaders, privately, clashed as Kasavubu argued that Tshombe's provisional government mandate would end as soon as the results of the elections were known, while Tshombe preferred to delay his government's resignation until after the presidential election, which he intended to contest. The new constitution had increased the powers of the presidency while diminishing those of the prime minister, making the office far more attractive to Tshombe.

== History ==
As the summer months progressed, Tshombe's political and parliamentary support began to erode as important political leaders in CONACO defected, some joining a new parliamentary group sympathetic to Kasa-Vubu, the Front Démocratique Congolais (FDC).

Founded in late September, by Interior Minister Victor Nendaka Bika, who had been elected on the CONACO list, the FDC initially claimed to include ABAKO, Mwinda-Bakongo, MNC-Lumumba, LUKA, PSA, RAPELU, MUB, Unicentrale, Balubakat, PARECO—which denied its membership—and the Provinces Martyres—a group of 40 deputies and 30 CONACO senators from the eastern provinces led by Nendaka, which formed the "core" of the front. By the time parliament convened in September 1965, the two groups were almost equal in number, resulting in a divided parliament as the CONACO coalition retained control of the Chamber of Deputies, while the FDC's Sylvestre Mudingayi of RAPELU won the Senate presidency. This was done with the support of the Organisation de l'Entente Kasaienne (Odeka), a Kasaian interest group made up of those elected on CONACO lists, whose candidates dropped out in favor of Mudingayi.

Nendaka, whom Kasavubu had appointed, suggested in a memorandum to him that a meeting between Tshombe and himself be held to form a new cabinet. Within the presidential entourage, there still seemed to be hesitation about simply dismissing the Prime Minister. The preference was to give the impression of negotiating with him to the bitter end and to blame him for the failure of the negotiations by imposing unacceptable conditions.

=== Government ===
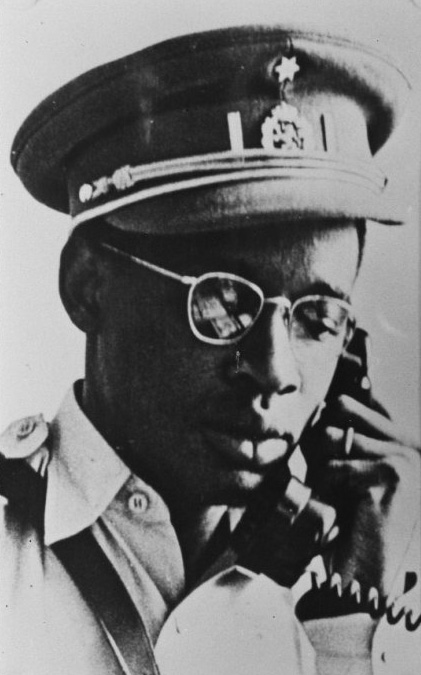
Mobutu in November 1965

Unable to obtain Tshombe's resignation and ignoring the advice of the Speakers of the Chamber and the Senate, as well as Mobutu, anxious to avoid a crisis, Kasa-Vubu decided to cut ties. At the first regular session of the new Parliament on October 13, he unexpectedly declared that Tshombe's transitional government had fulfilled its purpose of suppressing the leftist rebellions in the Eastern Congo; he replaced Tshombe with Évariste Kimba as prime minister, making him in charge of forming a Government of National Unity (GNU). The Kimba government was formally installed on October 18, with 16 of the 39 political parties in parliament being represented in government. Kimba, president of Balubakat, was too a Katangan and had previously been close to Tshombe but was a Muluba, an ethnic group generally opposed to the Lunda, which Tshombe belonged, and had recently become a member of the FDC.

Once a hard-liner Katangan successionist, Kimba's appointment was made in an attempt by Kasa-Vubu to avoid another Katangan succession by alleviating their concerns. Kimba was also politically weak and ill, making him a docile executor of the former's ambitions a few months before the presidential race.

Kimba, eager to facilitate a gradual transition between the Tshombe regime and the one that, in Kasa-Vubu's mind, should be established after his re-election to the highest office, originally sought to form a moderate and national unity ministry, but CONACO refused to support him, with the exception of four defectors who would hold secondary portfolios. The cabinet would ultimately display little homogeneity, comprising a wide variety of personalities, ranging from the former secessionist Kimba, to the Lumumbist Antoine Kiwewa. The only thing uniting them was their militant anti-Tshombism. The strongman of the team was Nendaka, whose position would've allowed him to play a leading role during the presidential campaign.

This move by Kasa-Vubu and/or his supporters was a miscalculation as the coalition government faced a vote of no confidence on November 14 and failed to gain the approval of the majority of lawmakers in either chamber, losing 72 to 76 in the Chamber of Deputies and 49 to 58 in the Senate. Despite this however, Kasa-Vubu reappointed Kimba as prime minister to the opposition of the Pro-Tshombe deputies in Parliament, leading to a paralyzed government.

Amidst the political deadlock, Mobutu militarily intervened. On November 25, 1965, he staged a bloodless coup, citing the need to restore order and bring an end to the intenable political situation. Announced via radio, the coup attempt progressed smoothly with little resistance met from either Kasa-Vubu or Tshombe supporters as Mobutu took control of the government. The country's capital and major cities remained calm with little visible military presence.

=== Under Mobutu ===
On the afternoon of the coup, Mobutu addressed a joint session of the legislature, announcing, among other things, the suspension of all political activities by parties. The parties were not immediately dissolved as Mobutu still needed the backing of certain politicians and parties, particularly the FDC, whose politicians the Léonard Mulamba government especially relied on. In that cabinet, the FDC held 12 positions to the CONACO's 8. Political parties were soon banned.

== Works cited ==
- Gerard-Libois, Jules; Verhaegen, Benoit (1967). Congo 1965: Political Documents of a Developing Nation. Princeton University Press. pp. ix–xi, 221–227. ISBN 9780691030128.
- Hayward, Fred M. (2019). Elections in Independent Africa. Taylor & Francis. pp. 252–256. ISBN 9780429712005.
- Rudin, Harry R. (1966). "Political Rivalry in the Congo". Current History. 50 (295).
- DRC: Constitutional Crisis between Kasavubu and Tshombe. pp. 67–68.
- "Congo de Janvier 1965 a Mars 1966". Chronique de politique étrangère. 20 (1). Egmont Institute: 15–17. 1967. JSTOR 44828568.
