= Second Mobutu coup d'état =

1965 coup in the Democratic Republic of the Congo

- Part of Congo Crisis
Date	25 November 1965
Location	Léopoldville, Democratic Republic of the Congo
Result	Coup d'état successful: Joseph Kasa-Vubu and Evariste Kimba deposed.; Joseph Mobutu installed as the President of the Democratic Republic of Congo; End of the Congo Crisis

Belligerents
Government of the Democratic Republic of the Congo	Armed Forces of the Democratic Republic of the Congo

Commanders and leaders
Joseph Kasa-Vubu; Evariste Kimba	Joseph Mobutu

The second Mobutu coup d'état, launched on November 25, 1965, was a successful coup attempt in the Republic of the Congo (Léopoldville) by General Joseph Mobutu which overthrew President Joseph Kasa-Vubu and Prime Minister Evariste Kimba. The coup was caused by the political impasse between President Kasa-Vubu and Moïse Tshombe, which threatened to develop into a violent confrontation and destabilize the country even further. The coup was initially met with cautious approval domestically and abroad. It marked the end of the years-long Congo Crisis.

During his first coup in 1960 however, Mobutu temporarily removed Kasa-Vubu from power to "restore order" before stepping down and reinstating him. This time, Mobutu seized full power and became president himself. He then declared a state of emergency and assumed near-dictatorial powers. Though he promised to restore democracy in five years, he instead consolidated power and established an authoritarian regime that would dominate the Congo (later Zaire) for over three decades.

== Background ==
On September 5, 1960, President Kasa-Vubu announced the dismissal of his prime minister, Patrice Lumumba, due his controversial handlings of the Congo's regional conflicts, such as the massacres in South Kasai which led to severe human rights violations and widespread violence. However, Lumumba refused to recognize his own dismissal, arguing that it was illegitimate and in response declared Kasa-Vubu deposed.

Amidst the power struggle between Kasa-Vubu and Lumumba, General Mobutu staged a bloodless coup d'état on September 14, 1960, claiming that his intervention was necessary to prevent the country from descending into chaos. Framing his intervention as a "peaceful revolution" rather than a traditional coup, Mobutu avoided presenting himself as a dictator and insisted his primary role was to restore order. While he publicly maintained a neutral stance, Mobutu privately aligned himself with Kasa-Vubu at the expense of Lumumba, placing him under house arrest.

In December 1960, Lumumba was captured while attempting to escape house arrest and subsequently transferred to Katanga, then a secessionist province led by Moïse Tshombe, where he was held. A month later on January 17, 1961, Lumumba was executed by a firing squad composed of Katangan soldiers, his body being dismembered and dissolved in sulphuric acid to destroy evidence of the murder.

In 1963, Pierre Mulele led an uprising in Kwilu as part of a broader rebellion - the Simba Rebellion - that sought to overthrow the central government. The Congo army, the Armée Nationale Congolaise (ANC), proved ineffective in defending the country, primarily due to incompetent leadership. As a result, the largely untrained rebel forces managed to capture significant portions of Northeastern Congo, including Stanleyville, the Congo's third largest city. Desperate for military support, President Kasa-Vubu turned to former Katanga secessionist leader Moïse Tshombe for help, forming an alliance with him. Tshombe, with the financial backing of Belgian businessmen, hired mercenaries to combat the Simba rebels. This alliance, coupled with support from US and Belgian paratroopers, ultimately helped to crush the rebellion by late 1964.

By 1965, with the Kwilu and Simba rebellions largely quelled, the alliance between Kasa-Vubu and Tshombe had outlived its usefulness. Tshombe was turning out to be a political liability for Kasa-Vubu, as he was suspected by many to be complicit in Lumumba's assassination, thus tarnishing his public image. As a result, Kasa-Vubu moved to remove Tshombe from power, which led to a political split between the two.

== Coup ==
In the March 1965 elections, Tshombe's political alliance, the Congolese National Convention (CONACO), won the majority of seats in both chambers of Parliament. However, much of the alliance's members defected to form the Congolese Democratic Front (FDC), resulting in a divided parliament as CONACO retained control of the Chamber of Deputies while the FDC gained control of the Senate.

At the first session of the new Parliament on October 13, President Kasa-Vubu, amidst an increasingly intense political rivalry with Tshombe, unexpectedly declared that Tshombe's transitional government had fulfilled its purpose of suppressing the leftist rebellions in the Eastern Congo; he replaced Tshombe with Évariste Kimba as prime minister, making him in charge of forming a Government of National Unity (GNU). The Kimba government was formally installed on October 18, with 16 of the 39 political parties in parliament being represented in government.

The coalition government faced a vote of no confidence on November 14 and failed to gain the approval of the majority of lawmakers, losing 72 to 76 in the Chamber of Deputies and 49 to 58 in the Senate. Despite this however, President Kasa-Vubu reappointed Kimba as prime minister to the opposition of the pro-Tshombe deputies in Parliament, leading to a paralyzed government. Amidst the political deadlock, Gen. Joseph Mobutu, head of the army, militarily intervened. On November 24, leaders of the Congolese military held a meeting at which they agreed to enact a coup. According to Le Monde, the immediate cause for the plot was Mobutu's frustration with Minister of Interior Victor Nendaka's refusal to allow Belgian officers to assume commanding roles in the army.

On November 25, 1965, Mobutu staged a bloodless coup, citing the need to restore order and bring an end to the untenable political situation. Announced via radio, the coup attempt progressed smoothly with little resistance met from either Kasa-Vubu or Tshombe supporters as Mobutu took control of the government. The country's capital and major cities remained calm with little visible military presence. Kasa-Vubu was at his presidential palace getting ready for work and did not hear the initial broadcast. When his daughter, Marie-Rose, informed him of the announced coup, he expressed disbelief. Soldiers shortly thereafter arrived and secured the residence.

Following his seizure of power, Mobutu declared in a 11-point proclamation that he was assuming all presidential powers but vowed to preserve national institutions such as the Parliament, safeguard personal rights, respect international agreements, and maintain the Congo's membership in international bodies, while also rescinding actions against foreigners and opposition newspapers. Elections scheduled for March 1966 were cancelled, and Kasavubu and Tshombe were formally prohibited from holding political office for five years.

Mobutu promised to only retain his sweeping presidential powers for five years, after which democracy would be restored. He appointed Colonel Leonard Mulamba as prime minister and General Louis Bobozo nominally as commander-in-chief of the Armed Forces. He secured the support of both chamber presidents in the Congolese Parliament, legitimizing his rule. Mulamba formed a government on 27 November.

Most political leaders supported the 1965 coup, with no significant opposition. While former prime minister Tshombe was pleased with Kasavubu's removal, he was less enthusiastic about the return of Mobutu to the presidency, which canceled the upcoming presidential elections in March. Parliament voted to approve of the putsch. Kasavubu was detained in Kokolo Camp until 5 December, when, upon refusing Mobutu's offer to become a member of the Senate, he was released to return to his home village in the Lower Congo and withdraw from politics.

Despite being unconstitutional, the coup was seen as potentially preventing a violent confrontation between Kasa-Vubu and Tshombe. The coup was condemned by the Soviet Union, China, Algeria, and several other African states. Most Congolese rebel leaders including Gaston Soumialot criticised the takeover, though Christophe Gbenye welcomed it and criticised Kasavubu and Tshombe.

== Aftermath ==
Initially, Mobutu allowed the Congolese Parliament to remain open following the coup, with the expectation that it would approve his decisions and constitutional changes. He planned to rule for five years while still keeping Parliament active.

However, the experiment failed almost immediately. During the recess of Parliament, many Assembly members used their time off to stir up opposition to Mobutu and his policies.

His frustration with the body reached its breaking point when he learned that some members of Parliament intended to overturn the laws and ordinances he had passed. In response, Mobutu stripped Parliament of most of its powers, only allowing it to rubber-stamp his constitutional changes.

By 1966, Mobutu had abolished the post of prime minister, and in June 1967, following popular referendum, he dissolved the bicameral legislature—comprising the Chamber of Deputies and the Senate—and replaced it with a unicameral Legislative Council.

== Works cited ==
- O'Ballance, Edgar (1999). The Congo-Zaire Experience, 1960–98. Basingstoke: Palgrave Macmillan. ISBN 978-0-230-28648-1.
- Reid, Stuart A. (2023). The Lumumba Plot. New York: Alfred A. Knopf. ISBN 9781524748814.
- Young, Crawford; Turner, Thomas Edwin (1985). The Rise and Decline of the Zairian State. University of Wisconsin Press. ISBN 9780299101138.
