= Alexandre Mahamba =

Congolese politician

- Born: Belgian Congo
- Died: 2 June 1966; Léopoldville, Democratic Republic of the Congo
- Occupation: Politician

Alexandre Mahamba (died 2 June 1966) was a Congolese politician. He was appointed as the first Minister of Land Affairs of the Republic of the Congo, now the Democratic Republic of the Congo, under the Lumumba Government that ran from 24 June until 12 September 1960 under the leadership of Prime Minister Patrice Lumumba. He was a member of MNC-L.

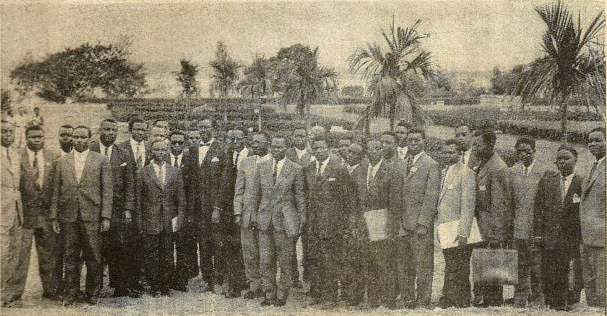
Patrice Lumumba (left center) with his first government outside the Palais de la Nation soon after swearing-in ceremony

In May 1966 Mahamba and former government ministers Jérôme Anany, Emmanuel Bamba, and Évariste Kimba were arrested by Mobutu's security forces while attending a meeting with military officials. They were taken to a military camp and tortured. Mobutu's regime accused them of plotting to assassinate Mobutu and Prime Minister Léonard Mulamba and overthrow the government.

On 30 May the four men were tried before a military tribunal. The trial lasted an hour and a half and the accused were allowed no legal counsel. They pleaded innocence, claiming that they had been working at the behest of officers in the army. After deliberating for seven minutes, the three military judges found the four men guilty of treason and sentenced them to death. This was in violation of standing Congolese law, which did not consider plotting a coup to be a capital crime. On 2 June 1966, the men were publicly hanged in Léopoldville before a large crowd.

== Works cited ==
- Ikambana, Jean-Louise Peta (2006). Mobutu's Totalitarian Political System: An Afrocentric Analysis. Routledge. ISBN 9781135861513.
