= Emmanuel Damongo-Dadet =

His Excellency Emmanuel J. Damongo-Dadet

The Republic of Congo Ambassador to the United States & United Nations
- In office December 9, 1960 – December 23, 1964

Personal details
- Born: 1916 Impfondo
- Died: March 14, 1973 Pointe Noire
- Party: Congolese Progressive Party, later founding Congolese Democratic Front

Emmanuel J. Damongo-Dadet (August 18, 1914 – March 14, 1973) was the first Congolese ambassador to the United States and the United Nations.

== Biography ==
Emmanuel was born in Impfondo, at the time Congo was the Middle Congo, a colony that was ruled by France. In his early days, he was taught at Brazzaville and went on to become a teacher and director of École Urbaine at Dolisie. A renowned journalist, poet and novelist in his native country, he wrote Congolila, published in 1950, and Panorama Congolais in 1962.

Emmanuel Damongo-Dadet was also a prefect in the colonial administration during the time Félix Eboué was the governor-general of the French Equatorial Africa (FEA). In 1945, he entered politics joining the Congolese Progressive Party (PPC) that dominated Congolese politics for years, and was elected councillor-representative in the Middle Congo territorial assembly in 1946. It was also a year later through the territorial assembly that he was elected to become the representative in the French Union assembly. In 1949, he abandoned the PPC long after it became a branch of Félix Houphouët-Boigny's party, the African Democratic Rally (RDA). As a result, he lost both seats in the elections to the Middle-Congo territorial assembly and the French Union assembly in 1952 and 1953.

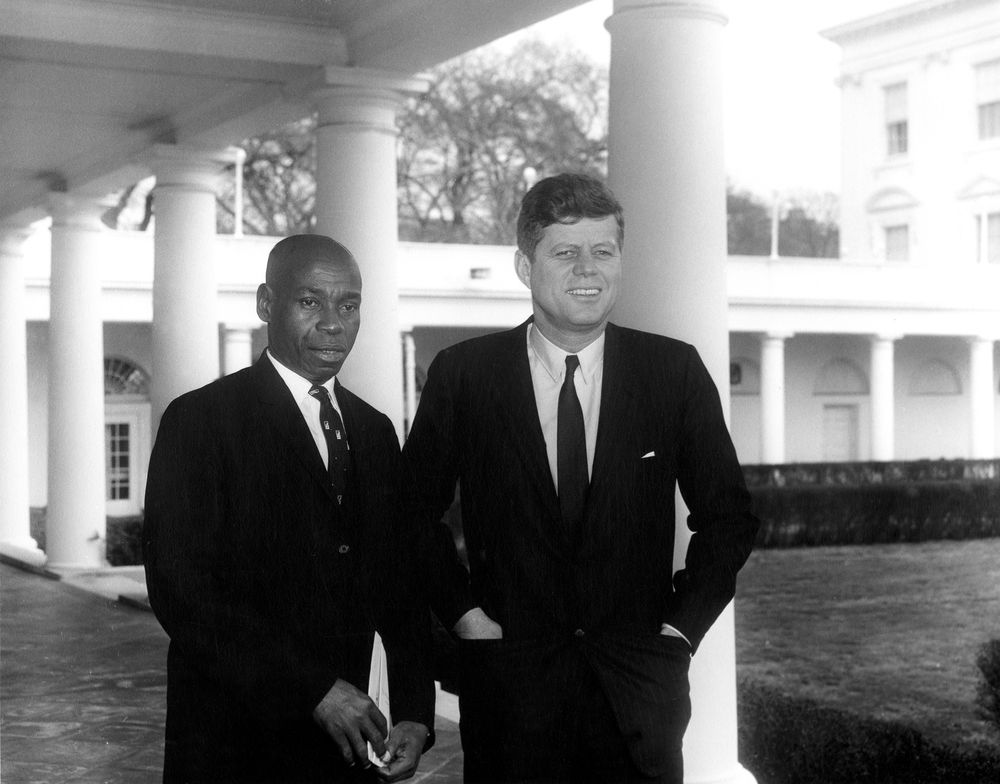
Emmanuel Damongo-Dadet meeting with President John F. Kennedy, 1961

Before re-emerging and forming the short-lived Congolese Democratic Front (FDC) in 1955, Emmanuel Damongo-Dadet embarked on a career in broadcasting occupying the position of Chief of the African broadcasts of the French Equatorial Africa Radio. In the 1956 legislative election, he lost a challenge to the incumbent Jean-Félix Tchicaya for Deputy of the Middle Congo to the French National assembly and was persuaded by Fulbert Youlou to align with his party, the Democratic Union for the Defense of African Interests (UDDIA). He was rewarded the position of Chief Secretary of Ministries of the Budget and Financial Affairs and Minister of Public Works and Transport. Further, he was part of the Congolese delegation to the Secretariat-General of the French Community in Paris in 1960 before Congo gained independence from France with Youlou as the president. Finally, on December 9, 1960, he was appointed to serve as the ambassador of the Republic of Congo to the United States and the United Nations. He died in Pointe Noire at the age of 58.
