= 1965 Democratic Republic of the Congo general election =

- 18 March – 30 April 1965

167 members of the Chamber of Deputies
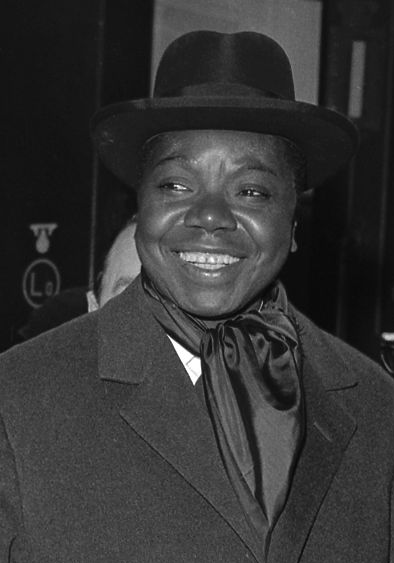

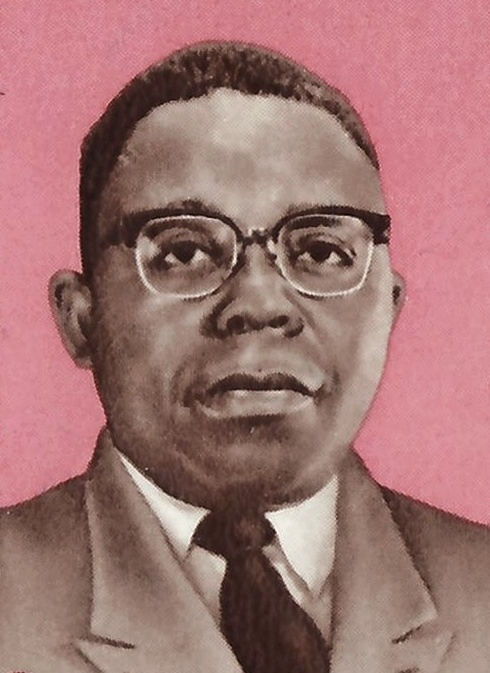

	Majority party	Minority party	Third party
Leader	Moïse Tshombe	Joseph Kasa-Vubu
Party	CONACO	ABAKO	AMNCL
Seats won	122	10	7
Seat change	New	▼2	New
- Results by electoral district (post-reruns)
Prime Minister before election
Moïse Tshombe
CONAKAT
Elected Prime Minister
Évariste Kimba
FDC

General elections were held in the Democratic Republic of the Congo between 18 March and 30 April 1965, following the promulgation of a new constitution approved by a referendum the previous year. 223 political parties contested the election for 167 seats in the Chamber of Deputies. The elections had originally been scheduled for the summer of 1964, but were postponed due to the Simba rebellion, ultimately taking place in March 1965. The process was "relatively free of fraud or rigging", except for in Kinshasa, where a lack of ballots and personnel delayed voting there by a month.

The number of electoral lists competing dropped from 250 in 1960 to 227. Yet, more parties won seats this time, as there were no truly national parties. The creation of new provinces, fueling regional and ethnic claims to autonomy, and the adoption of the Luluabourg Constitution, which established a de facto federal structure, contributed to the fragmentation. In practice, provinces enjoyed substantial autonomy, as the central government lacked the capacity to fully enforce its authority. Every major party from the previous election had since fractured, making the emergence of a cohesive national party impossible. As a result, political power could only be secured through the formation of a coalition.

Before the rebellions, an attempt to form an alliance of parties was initiated by Prime Minister Cyrille Adoula under the name Rassemblement des Démocrate Congolais (RADECO). However, this alliance lost momentum in the wake of the rebellions and died out with the appointment of former secessionist leader Moïse Tshombe as Prime Minister. Once in power, Tshombe created a coalition of circumstance called the Convention Nationale Congolaise (CONACO). 49 list were represented at the CONACO congress a month before the election. There, a vague platform was adopted, proclaiming CONACO's commitment to democracy, development, human rights, and provincial autonomy, while opposing racism, colonialism, tribalism, regionalism, and secessionism. The preferred candidate of a large segment of the "moderate" coalition was Tshombe.

Lumumbist parties, initially boycotting the elections as they felt they could not be held democratically, on the eve of the elections, formed a Lumumbist coalition called the Alliance des mouvements nationalistes congolais Lumumba (AMNCL). The alliance demanded the release of Antoine Gizenga and his associates, the restoration of the democratic freedoms enshrined in the constitution, and declared themselves to be the sole nationalist name in the election. The coalition brought together MNC-L, Unified Lumumbist Party, ATCAR, and Balubakat. The preferred candidate of the nationalists was Kasavubu.

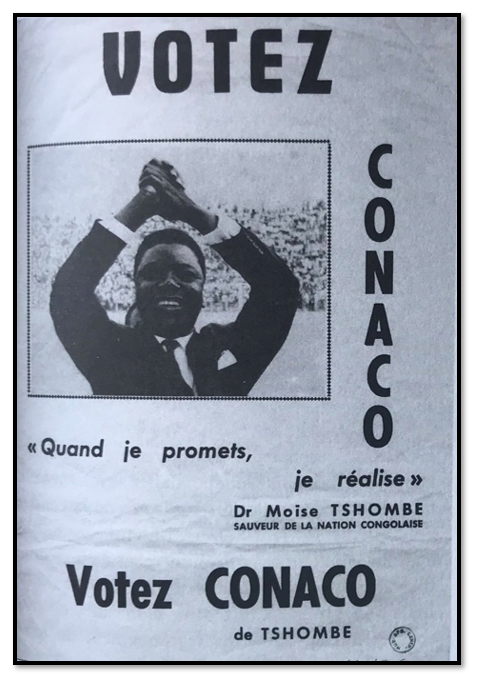
Campaign poster for CONACO. The message on the poster says "when I promise, I deliver"

Following the elections, the results were disputed by several parties. The Léopoldville Court of Appeal accepted six of them, and re-runs were required in Kivu Central, (Note: Only the national elections were cancelled in these constituencies) Goma-Rutshuru, Cuvette Centrale, Fizi, Kwilu and Maniema, which were held between 8 and 22 August 1965. In Fizi and Maniema, where the cancellations came into effect on August 23, new elections were not held, but representatives for these constituencies were appointed at the beginning of 1966. The CONACO coalition, led by a "politician of indisputable charm and skill" and benefiting from access to the national treasury, was able to secure 122 seats (after re-runs). The AMNCL, whose member parties had suffered from internal fractures, the discrediting and defeat of the rebellions, and had their primary bastion of support in military-occupied territories, was only able to secure 7 (after re-runs).

However, this unity within the CONACO coalition didn't last long and by the time parliament convened in September 1965, defectors had formed the Front Démocratique Congolais (FDC) coalition, resulting in a divided parliament as the CONACO coalition retained control of the Chamber of Deputies while the FDC gained control of the Senate.

At the first session of the new Parliament on October 13, President Kasa-Vubu, amidst an increasingly intense political rivalry with Tshombe, unexpectedly declared that Tshombe's transitional government had fulfilled its purpose of suppressing the leftist rebellions in the Eastern Congo; he replaced Tshombe with Évariste Kimba as prime minister, making him in charge of forming a Government of National Unity (GNU). The Kimba government was formally installed on October 18, with 16 of the 39 political parties in parliament being represented in government.

The coalition government faced a vote of no confidence on November 14 and failed to gain the approval of the majority of lawmakers, losing 72 to 76 in the Chamber of Deputies and 49 to 58 in the Senate. Despite this however, President Kasa-Vubu reappointed Kimba as prime minister to the opposition of the Pro-Tshombe deputies in Parliament, leading to a paralyzed government.

Amidst the political deadlock, Gen. Joseph Mobutu, head of the army, militarily intervened. On November 25, 1965, Mobutu staged a bloodless coup, citing the need to restore order and bring an end to the intenable political situation. Announced via radio, the coup attempt progressed smoothly with little resistance met from either Kasa-Vubu or Tshombe supporters as Mobutu took control of the government. The country's capital and major cities remained calm with little visible military presence.

== Results ==
=== Chamber of Deputies ===
==== Pre-annulment ====
Party or alliance		Votes	%	Seats	+/–
CONACO-led Coalition	Convention Nationale Congolaise	227,961	9.24	38	New
CONACO-led Coalition	CONAKAT	178,302	7.23	9	+1
CONACO-led Coalition	Congolese Democratic Union	162,016	6.57	10	New
CONACO-led Coalition	Association of the Wanande of Beni and Lubero	104,896	4.25	7	New
CONACO-led Coalition	Rally for Congolese Democracy/Conaco	91,475	3.71	4	New
CONACO-led Coalition	African Democratic Union-Lubaya	64,845	2.63	4	New
CONACO-led Coalition	LUKA	62,856	2.55	4	+1
CONACO-led Coalition	Katangan Common Front	59,223	2.40	3	New
CONACO-led Coalition	Congolese Regrouping Party/Conaco	56,698	2.30	4	New
CONACO-led Coalition	Congolese National Party/Conaco	52,060	2.11	4	New
CONACO-led Coalition	Congolese Regrouping/Conaco	49,675	2.01	6	New
CONACO-led Coalition	Congolese Democrat Party/Conaco	49,039	1.99	4	New
CONACO-led Coalition	Luba People's Rally/Conaco	48,944	1.98	4	New
CONACO-led Coalition	Congolese Democratic Party/Conaco	42,878	1.74	2	New
CONACO-led Coalition	Movement for the Democratic Evolution of Africa	36,441	1.48	2	New
CONACO-led Coalition	Association of Socialist Christians of Congo	36,430	1.48	3	New
CONACO-led Coalition	Congolese National Party	35,275	1.43	3	New
CONACO-led Coalition	Popular Movement of Sankuru/Conaco	34,811	1.41	2	New
CONACO-led Coalition	PDR/Conaco	29,277	1.19	5	New
CONACO-led Coalition	Cartels CONACO/Conaco	23,052	0.93	1	New
CONACO-led Coalition	Congolese Democratic Rally	19,912	0.81	1	New
CONACO-led Coalition	Basonge Unity Movement/Conaco	16,314	0.66	3	+2
CONACO-led Coalition	National Public Salvation Front/Conaco	15,104	0.61	1	New
CONACO-led Coalition	CTS–UPP/Conaco	9,781	0.40	1	New
CONACO-led Coalition	Association of Socialist Christians of Congo	6,226	0.25	1	New
ABAKO		136,226	5.52	10	–2
AMNCL	BALUKABAT	64,866	2.63	3	New
AMNCL	Mouvement National Congolais-Lumumba	31,874	1.29	2	–34
AMNCL	ATCAR	24,710	1.00	2	+1
Party of National Unity		82,601	3.35	4	–4
Parti Solidaire Africain-Kamitatu		79,358	3.22	4	–9
Mwinda-Bakongo		68,750	2.79	5	New
Budjala Union		32,780	1.33	1	New
ATCAR-Conaco (Note: This faction of the ATCAR's list name included CONACO but did not partake in the CONACO Congress of Luluabourg)		25,375	1.03	1	−
Association of Citizens of Tshuapa		22,011	0.89	2	New
Union of the Citizens of Lake Leopold II		19,944	0.81	1	New
Common Front of North Kivu		19,179	0.78	1	New
Congolese Democratic Party		15,059	0.61	1	New
Congolese Rural Party		21,861	0.89	1	New
INTERCOUP-Huapa		11,645	0.47	1	New
BA-LIKOLO		9,634	0.39	1	New
Regional parties		274,778	11.14	0	0
Independents		12,815	0.52	1	+1
Total		2,466,957	100.00	167	+30
Source: Sternberger et al. Gerard-Libois et al. (coalitions)

==== Following re-runs ====
Party or alliance		Seats	+/–
CONACO-led Coalition	Convention Nationale Congolaise	37	New
CONACO-led Coalition	CONAKAT	9	+1
CONACO-led Coalition	Association of the Wanande of Beni and Lubero	7	New
CONACO-led Coalition	Congolese National Party/Conaco	7	New
CONACO-led Coalition	Congolese Democratic Union	7	New
CONACO-led Coalition	Rally for Congolese Democracy/Conaco	5	New
CONACO-led Coalition	Congolese Regrouping/Conaco	5	New
CONACO-led Coalition	Association of Socialist Christians of Congo	4	New
CONACO-led Coalition	Congolese Democrat Party/Conaco	4	New
CONACO-led Coalition	LUKA	4	+1
CONACO-led Coalition	Congolese Regrouping Party/Conaco	4	+1
CONACO-led Coalition	Luba People's Rally/Conaco	4	New
CONACO-led Coalition	African Democratic Union-Lubaya	4	New
CONACO-led Coalition	Katangan Front	3	New
CONACO-led Coalition	Basonge Unity Movement/Conaco	3	+2
CONACO-led Coalition	Movement for the Democratic Evolution of Africa	2	New
CONACO-led Coalition	Popular Movement of Sankuru/Conaco	2	New
CONACO-led Coalition	Congolese Republican Party	2	New
CONACO-led Coalition	PDR/Conaco	2	New
CONACO-led Coalition	Association of the Akutshu-Anamongo/Conaco	1	New
CONACO-led Coalition	CTS–UPP/Conaco	1	+2
CONACO-led Coalition	National Public Salvation Front/Conaco	1	New
CONACO-led Coalition	African Socialist Democratic Party/Conaco	1	New
CONACO-led Coalition	Congolese Democratic Party/Conaco	3	New
CONACO-led Coalition	Total	122	New
ABAKO		10	–2
AMNCL	BALUKABAT	3	New
AMNCL	Mouvement National Congolais-Lumumba	2	–34
AMNCL	ATCAR	2	+1
AMNCL	Total	7	New
Parti Solidaire Africain-Kamitatu		7	–6
Mwinda-Bakongo		5	New
Party of National Unity		4	-4
Unicentrale		4	New
Association of Citizens of Tshuapa		2	New
ATCAR-CONACO		1	New
BA-LIKOLO		1	New
Common Front of North Kivu		1	New
Union of the Citizens of Lake Leopold II		1	New
Budjala Union		1	New
Independents		1	+1
Total		167	+30
Source: Gerard-Libois et al.
