= Congolese Democratic Front =

Political party in Moyen-Congo

The Congolese Democratic Front (French: Front démocratique congolais, FDC) was a political party in Moyen-Congo. The party was founded by Emmanuel Dadet after he left the Congolese Progressive Party (PPC). The FDC failed to become a major force in Congolese politics. In 1956, Dadet joined the Democratic Union for the Defense of African Interests (UDDIA).

FDC was also the name of an exile opposition group, that was founded by Aloïse Moudileno-Massengo in the 1970s.
