= Léonard Mulamba =

Congolese Prime Minister from 1965 to 1966

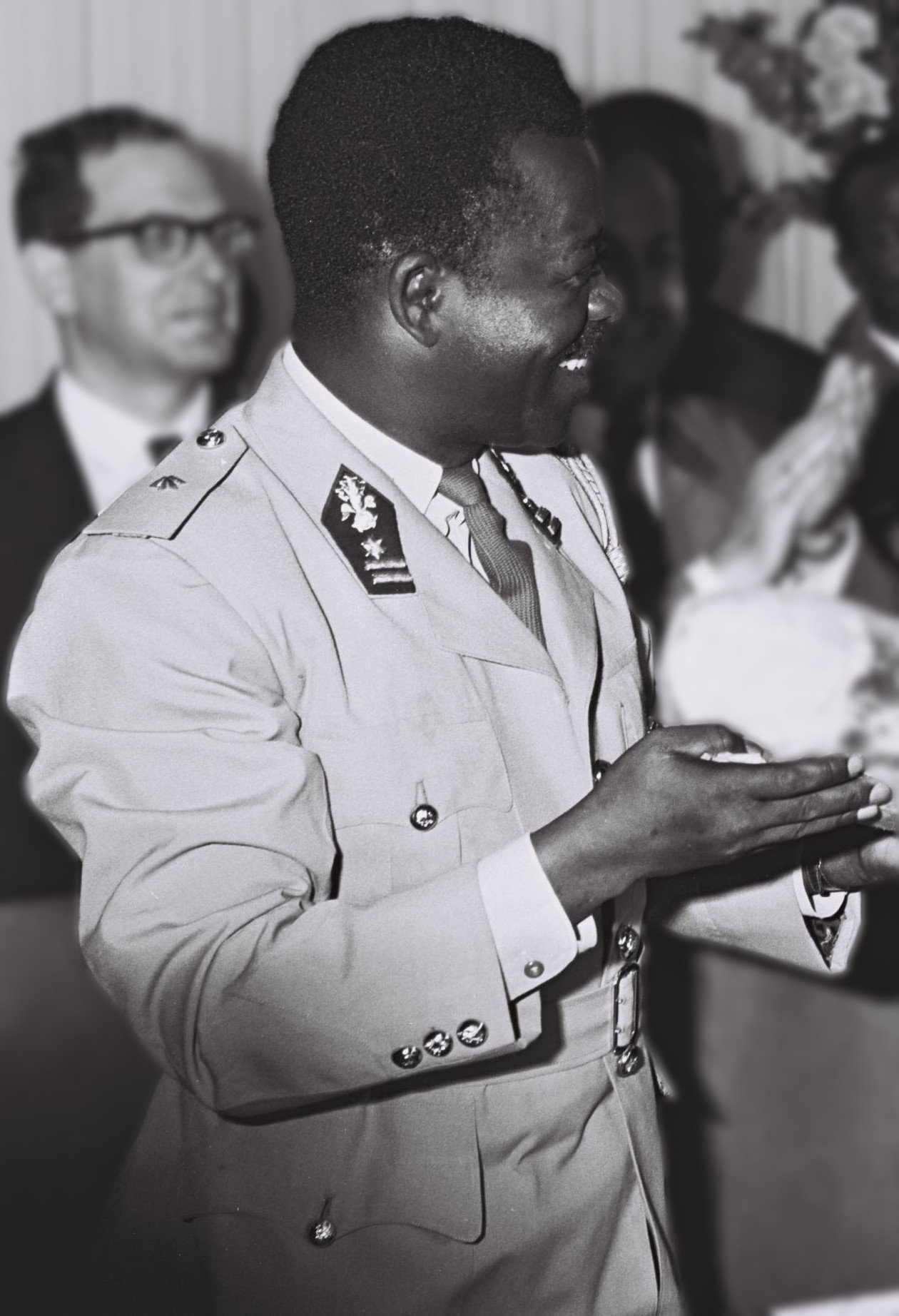
- Mulamba in 1966

8th Prime Minister of Congo-Léopoldville
- In office 25 November 1965 – 26 October 1966
- President: Joseph-Désiré Mobutu
- Preceded by: Évariste Kimba
- Succeeded by: Position abolished Mpinga Kasenda in 1977 (as First State Commissioner of the Republic of Zaire)

Personal details
- Born: 1928; Belgian Congo (Now Congo-Kinshasa)
- Died: 12 August 1986 (aged 57–58)
- Political party: None (military officer)

Major-General Léonard Mulamba (1928 – 12 August 1986), subsequently Zairianised as Mulamba Nyunyi wa Kadima, was a Congolese military and political leader.

== Biography ==
Then-Colonel Mulamba was Chief of Staff of the Congolese National Army (ANC) from October 1964, until named Prime Minister after the coup d'état led by Joseph-Désiré Mobutu of 25 November 1965. Born in the Kasaï region in 1930, Mulamba joined the colonial gendarmerie known as the Force Publique in 1949. He was promoted to the rank of Sergeant Major by 1960 and after independence quickly became an officer. He commanded IX battalion of gendarmes at Luluabourg in 1960.

In 1962, he was assigned to command the 3rd Groupement at Stanleyville. He "gained international fame for.. defence of Bukavu and for conducting one of the most decisive battles of the 1964 north-east revolution the Simba rebellion of 1964. When Kisangani was recaptured from rebel forces in 1964 he was named military governor of the entire northeastern region." Mulamba has always enjoyed popularity with the troops under his command.

Mulamba was removed from premiership by Mobutu on 26 October 1966, following pressure from army high command. The Historical Dictionary of the DRC writes that "Mobutu dismissed Mulumba and abolished the post on 26 October 1966 by citing Mulumba's lax attitude to the mutiny of the Baka Regiment in Stanleyville" (the first of the Stanleyville mutinies). Following his dismissal, Mobutu became head of government as well as head of state.

He later served as ambassador to India (1967–1969), Japan (1969–1976) and Brazil (1976–1979).

Political offices
Preceded by Évariste Kimba	Prime Minister of Congo-Léopoldville; 25 November 1965 – 26 October 1966	Succeeded by Position abolished Mpinga Kasenda in 1977 as First State Commissioner of the Republic of Zaire
