= Congolese National Convention =

Political alliance in the Democratic Republic of the Congo

The Congolese National Convention (French: Convention Nationale Congolaise), also known as CONACO, was a federalist political alliance in the Democratic Republic of the Congo. It was formed and led by then Prime Minister, Moïse Tshombe.

It consisted of a bloc of forty-nine parties from among the more than 200 parties that were formed primarily for participation in the 1965 general elections. CONACO primarily drew its strength from the southern portions of the country and succeeded the Katanga-based CONAKAT party.

== Election results ==
Election results
Year	Leader	Votes	%	Rank	Seats
1965	Moïse Tshombe	227,961	9.2	1st	38 / 167

== See also ==
- Political parties in the Democratic Republic of the Congo
