= Democratic Republic of the Congo =

Country in Central Africa

Democratic Republic of the Congo République démocratique du Congo
- Flag Emblem
- Motto: Justice – Paix – Travail ("Justice – Peace – Work")
- Anthem: Debout Congolais ("Arise, Congolese")
- Capital and largest city: Kinshasa; 4°19′S 15°19′E
- Official languages: French
- Recognised national languages: Kikongo ya leta (Note: The term "Kikongo" in the Constitution is actually referring to the Kituba language – which is known as Kikongo ya leta by its speakers – not the Kongo language proper. The confusion arises from the fact that the government of the DRC officially recognizes and refers to the language as "Kikongo".); Lingala; Swahili; Luba-Kasai
- Religion (2026): 95.9% Christianity; 1.3% Islam; 1.3% others / none; 1.2% traditional faiths
- Demonym: Congolese
- Government: Unitary semi-presidential republic
  - President: Félix Tshisekedi
  - Prime Minister: Judith Suminwa
  - President of the Senate: Jean-Michel Sama Lukonde Kyenge
- Legislature: Parliament
  - Upper house: Senate
  - Lower house: National Assembly

Independence from Belgium
  - Colonised by Leopold II of Belgium: 17 November 1879
  - Congo Free State: 1 July 1885
  - Belgian Congo: 15 November 1908
  - Independence from Belgium: 30 June 1960
  - Admitted to the United Nations: 20 September 1960
  - Democratic Republic: 1 August 1964
  - Republic of Zaire: 27 October 1971
  - First Congo War: 17 May 1997
  - Current constitution: 18 February 2006

Area
  - Total: 2,345,409 km^{2} (905,567 sq mi) (11th)
  - Water (%): 3.32

Population
  - 2026 estimate: ▲116,452,000 (12th)
  - Density: 48/km^{2} (124.3/sq mi) (168th)
- GDP (PPP): 2026 estimate
  - Total: ▲$235.277 billion (79th)
  - Per capita: ▲$2,138 (180th)
- GDP (nominal): 2026 estimate
  - Total: ▲$122.281 billion (83rd)
  - Per capita: ▲$1,111 (182nd)
- Gini (2020): ▲44.7 medium inequality
- HDI (2023): ▲0.522 low (171st)
- Currency: Congolese franc (CDF)
- Time zone: UTC+1 to +2 (WAT and CAT)
- Date format: dd/mm/yyyy
- Calling code: +243
- ISO 3166 code: CD
- Internet TLD: .cd

The Democratic Republic of the Congo (DRC), (Note: French: République démocratique du Congo, RDC, pronounced [ʁepyblik demɔkʁatik dy kɔ̃ɡo]) also known as the DR Congo, Congo-Kinshasa, or simply the Congo, (Note: "Congo" ambiguously also refers to the neighbouring Republic of the Congo.) and formerly named Zaire, (Note: Its official name from 1971 to 1997.) is a country in Central Africa. By land area, it is the second-largest country in Africa and the eleventh-largest in the world. With a population of about 116 million people, the Democratic Republic of the Congo is the fourth-most populous country in Africa and the most populous Francophone country in the world. French is the official and most widely spoken language. There are over 200 indigenous languages, of which Lingala is the most widely spoken. The capital, largest city, and economic center is Kinshasa. The DRC is bordered by the Republic of the Congo, the Cabinda exclave of Angola, and the South Atlantic Ocean to the west; the Central African Republic and South Sudan to the north; Uganda, Rwanda, Burundi, and Tanzania (across Lake Tanganyika) to the east; and Zambia and Angola to the south. Centered on the Congo Basin, most of the DRC's terrain is covered by dense rainforests and is crossed by many rivers. The east and southeast are mountainous.

The territory of the Congo was first inhabited by Central African foragers around 90,000 years ago and was settled in the Bantu expansion about 2,000 to 3,000 years ago. In the west, the Kingdom of Kongo ruled around the mouth of the Congo River from the 14th to the 19th century. In the center and east, the empires of Mwene Muji, Luba, and Lunda ruled between the 15th and 19th centuries. These kingdoms were broken up by Europeans during the colonization of the Congo Basin. King Leopold II of Belgium acquired rights to the Congo territory in 1885 and called it the Congo Free State. In 1908, Leopold ceded the territory after international pressure in response to widespread atrocities, and it became a Belgian colony. Congo achieved independence from Belgium in 1960 and was immediately confronted by secessionist movements, the assassination of Prime Minister Patrice Lumumba, and the seizure of power by Mobutu Sese Seko in 1965. Mobutu renamed the country Zaire in 1971 and imposed a personalist dictatorship.

Instability caused by an influx of refugees from the Rwandan Civil War led to the First Congo War, from 1996 to 1997, which ended with Mobutu's overthrow. The country's name was changed, and it experienced the Second Congo War from 1998 to 2003, which resulted in an estimated several million deaths and the assassination of President Laurent-Désiré Kabila. The war ended under President Joseph Kabila, who restored relative stability. Human rights remained poor, and there were frequent abuses, such as forced disappearances, torture, arbitrary imprisonment and restrictions on civil liberties. Kabila stepped down in 2019 after Félix Tshisekedi won the contentious 2018 election, marking the country's first peaceful transition of power since independence. Over 120 armed groups remain active, concentrated in the east. One of the region's largest cities, Goma, was occupied by the M23 rebels in 2012 and again since 2025. The M23 uprising escalated in 2025 with military support from Rwanda, which has caused a conflict between the two countries.

Despite being rich in natural resources, the DRC is one of the world's poorest and least developed countries, having suffered from political instability, lack of infrastructure, rampant corruption, and centuries of commercial and colonial extraction and exploitation. Some argue it is a prominent example of the "resource curse". Aside from Kinshasa, the next largest cities, Lubumbashi and Mbuji-Mayi, are mining communities. DRC's main exports are raw minerals and metal, which accounted for 80% of exports in 2023, with China being its largest trade partner. The DRC's level of human development was ranked 171 out of 193 countries by the Human Development Index in 2023. As of 2022, following two decades of civil wars and internal conflicts, around one million Congolese refugees were still living in neighbouring countries. Two million children are at risk of starvation, and the fighting has displaced 7 million people. The DRC is a member of the United Nations, Non-Aligned Movement, African Union, COMESA, Southern African Development Community, Organisation internationale de la Francophonie, and Economic Community of Central African States.

== Etymology ==
The Democratic Republic of the Congo is named after the Congo River, which flows through the country. The Congo River is the world's deepest river and the world's third-largest river by discharge. The Comité d'études du haut Congo ("Committee for the Study of the Upper Congo"), established by King Leopold II of Belgium in 1876, and the International Association of the Congo, established by him in 1879, were also named after the river.

The Congo River was named by early European sailors after the Kingdom of Kongo and its Bantu inhabitants, the Kongo people, when they encountered them in the 16th century. The word Kongo comes from the Kongo language, also called Kikongo. According to American writer Samuel Henry Nelson: "It is probable that the word 'Kongo' itself implies a public gathering and that it is based on the root konga, 'to gather' (trans[itive])." The modern name of the Kongo people, Bakongo, was introduced in the early 20th century.

The Democratic Republic of the Congo has been known in the past as, in chronological order, the Congo Free State, Belgian Congo, the Republic of the Congo-Léopoldville, the Democratic Republic of the Congo and the Republic of Zaire, before returning to its current name, the Democratic Republic of the Congo.

At the time of independence, the country was named the Republic of the Congo-Léopoldville to distinguish it from its neighbour the Republic of the Congo. With the promulgation of the Luluabourg Constitution in August 1964, the country became the DRC. It was renamed Zaire, a past name for the Congo River, in October 1971 by President Mobutu Sese Seko as part of his Authenticité initiative.

The word Zaire is from a Portuguese adaptation of a Kikongo word nzadi ("river"), a truncation of nzadi o nzere ("river swallowing rivers"). The river was known as Zaire during the 16th and 17th centuries. Congo seems to have replaced Zaire gradually in English usage during the 18th century. Congo is the preferred English name in 19th-century literature, although references to Zaire as the name used by the natives (i.e., derived from Portuguese usage) remained common.

In 1992, the Sovereign National Conference voted to change the name of the country to the "Democratic Republic of the Congo", but the change was not made. The country's name was later restored by President Laurent-Désiré Kabila when he overthrew Mobutu in 1997. To distinguish it from the neighboring Republic of the Congo, it is sometimes referred to as Congo (Kinshasa) or Congo-Kinshasa. Its name is sometimes also abbreviated as Congo DR, DR Congo, DRC, the DROC, and RDC (in French).

== History ==
=== Early history ===
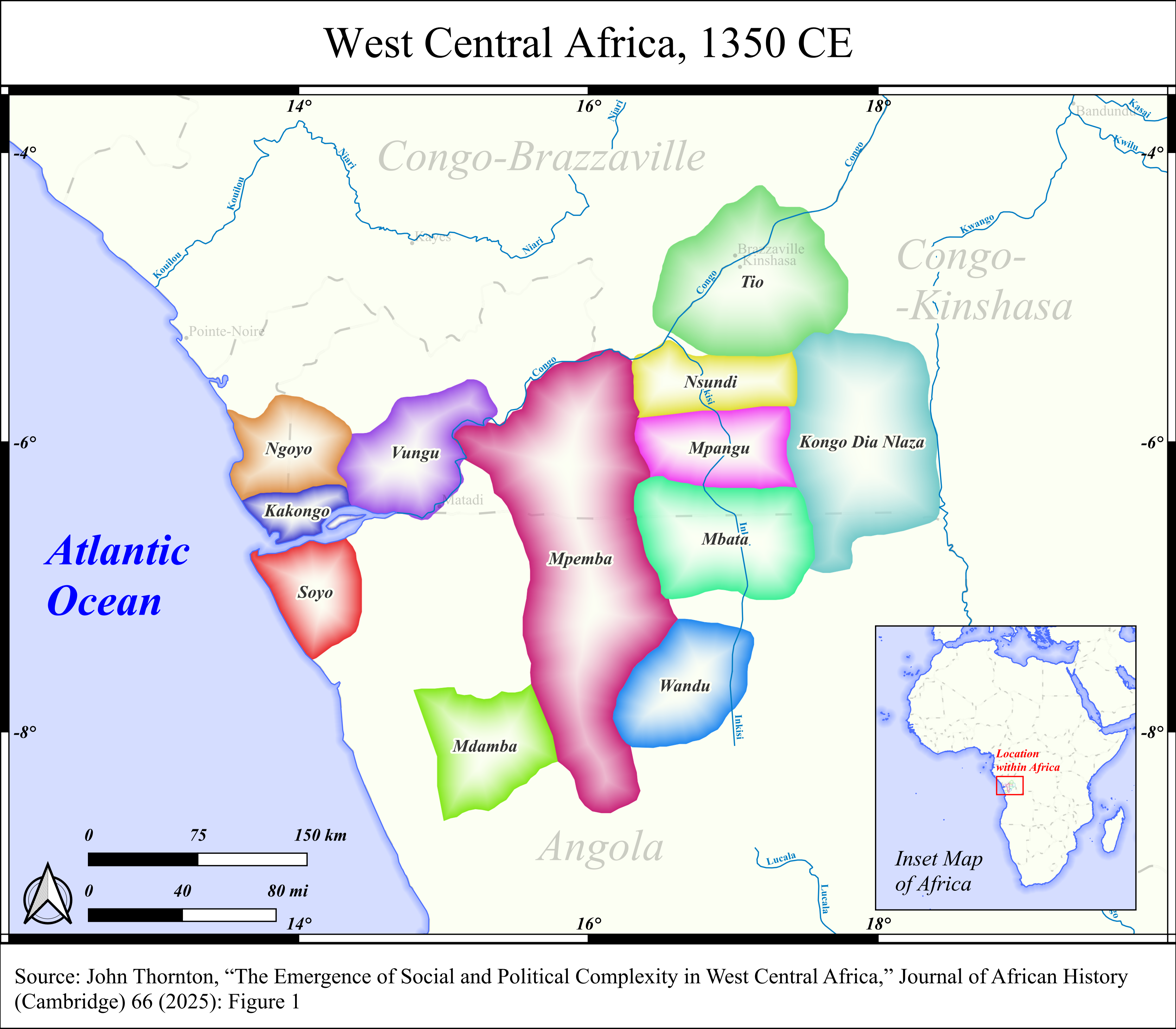
States of the western Congo Basin, c. 1350

The area of the present-day Democratic Republic of the Congo was inhabited as early as 90,000 years ago, and later underwent major demographic and technological change with the expansion of Bantu peoples during the first millennium BC. From this process emerged organised states and empires, including early federated states around Pool Malebo and later the Kingdom of Kongo, as well many others such as the Luba and Lunda Empires.

=== Congo Free State (1877–1908) ===
From the 1870s to 1908, King Leopold II of Belgium established and ruled the Congo Free State as his personal possession, using forced labour and concessionary companies to extract rubber, while violence, disease, and exploitation caused catastrophic population loss. International exposure of the abuses, notably through the 1904 Casement Report and growing diplomatic pressure, led to Leopold's loss of control and the annexation of the territory as the Belgian Congo in 1908.

=== Belgian Congo (1908–1960) ===
The Belgian Congo was governed directly from Brussels, and although this change in administration ended the most extreme abuses of the Congo Free State, Belgian rule largely continued earlier patterns of direct control, racial segregation, forced labour, and repression, while prioritising economic exploitation through close cooperation between the state, missionaries, and private companies. After World War II, urbanisation, development programmes, and limited social improvements fostered a small African middle class, but political exclusion persisted, contributing to the rise of nationalist movements and escalating demands for independence in the late 1950s.

=== Independence and political crisis (1960–1965) ===
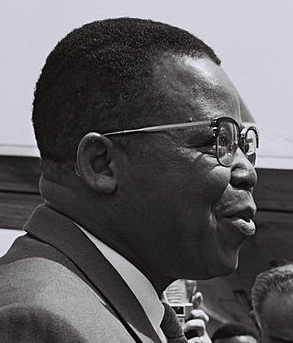
The leader of ABAKO, Joseph Kasa-Vubu, the first democratically elected president of Congo-Léopoldville

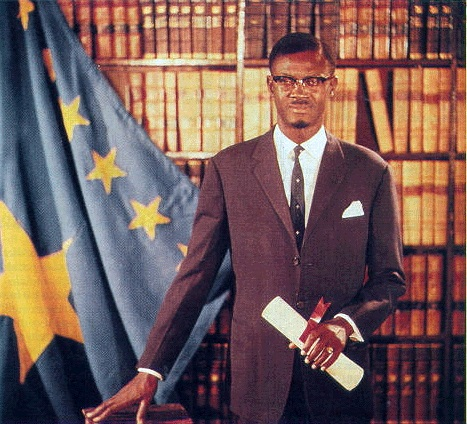
Patrice Lumumba, the first democratically elected prime minister of Congo-Léopoldville, was murdered by Belgian-supported Katangan separatists in 1961.

In May 1960, a growing nationalist movement, the Congolese National Movement led by Patrice Lumumba, won the parliamentary elections. Lumumba became the first prime minister of the Republic of the Congo, on 24 June 1960. The parliament elected Joseph Kasa-Vubu of the ABAKO party as president. Other parties that emerged included the African Solidarity Party lqed by Antoine Gizenga, and the National Party of the People led by Albert Delvaux and Laurent Mbariko.

The Belgian Congo achieved independence on 30 June 1960 under the name "Republic of the Congo". Shortly after independence the Force Publique mutinied, and on 11 July the province of Katanga, led by Moïse Tshombe, and South Kasai engaged in secessionist uprisings against the new leadership. Most of the 100,000 Europeans who had remained behind after independence fled the country. After the United Nations rejected Lumumba's call for help to put down the secessionist movements, Lumumba asked for assistance from the Soviet Union, who accepted and sent military supplies and advisers. On 23 August, the Congolese armed forces invaded South Kasai.

Lumumba was dismissed from office on 5 September 1960 by Kasa-Vubu, who publicly blamed him for massacres by the armed forces in South Kasai and for involving Soviets in the country. On 7 September, Lumumba made a speech to the Congolese House of Representatives, arguing his dismissal was illegal under the nation's laws. Congolese law gave parliament, not the president, the authority to dismiss a government minister. The House and Senate both rejected the dismissal of Lumumba, but the removal proceeded unconstitutionally.

On 14 September, Colonel Joseph Mobutu, with the backing of the US and Belgium, removed Lumumba from office. On 17 January 1961, Lumumba was handed over to Katangan authorities and executed by Belgian-led Katangan troops. A 2001 investigation by Belgium's Parliament found Belgium "morally responsible" for the murder of Lumumba, and the country has since officially apologised for its role in his death.

Amidst widespread confusion and chaos, a temporary government was created led by educated technocrats, the College of Commissioners-General. Katangan secession ended in January 1963 with the assistance of UN forces. Several short-lived governments took over in quick succession, led by Joseph Ileo, Cyrille Adoula, and then Tshombe.

Meanwhile, in the east of the country, Soviet and Cuban-backed rebels called the Simbas rose up, taking a significant amount of territory and proclaiming a communist "People's Republic of the Congo" in Stanleyville. The Simbas were pushed out of Stanleyville in November 1964 during Operation Dragon Rouge, a military operation conducted by Belgian and U.S. forces to rescue hundreds of hostages. Congolese government forces fully defeated the Simba rebels by November 1965.

Lumumba had previously appointed Mobutu chief of staff of the new Congolese National Army. Taking advantage of the leadership crisis between Kasavubu and Tshombe, Mobutu garnered enough support within the army to launch a coup. A constitutional referendum the year before Mobutu's coup of 1965 resulted in the country's official name being changed to the "Democratic Republic of the Congo". In 1971 Mobutu would change the name of the country again, this time to "Republic of Zaire".

=== Mobutu autocracy and Zaire (1965–1997) ===
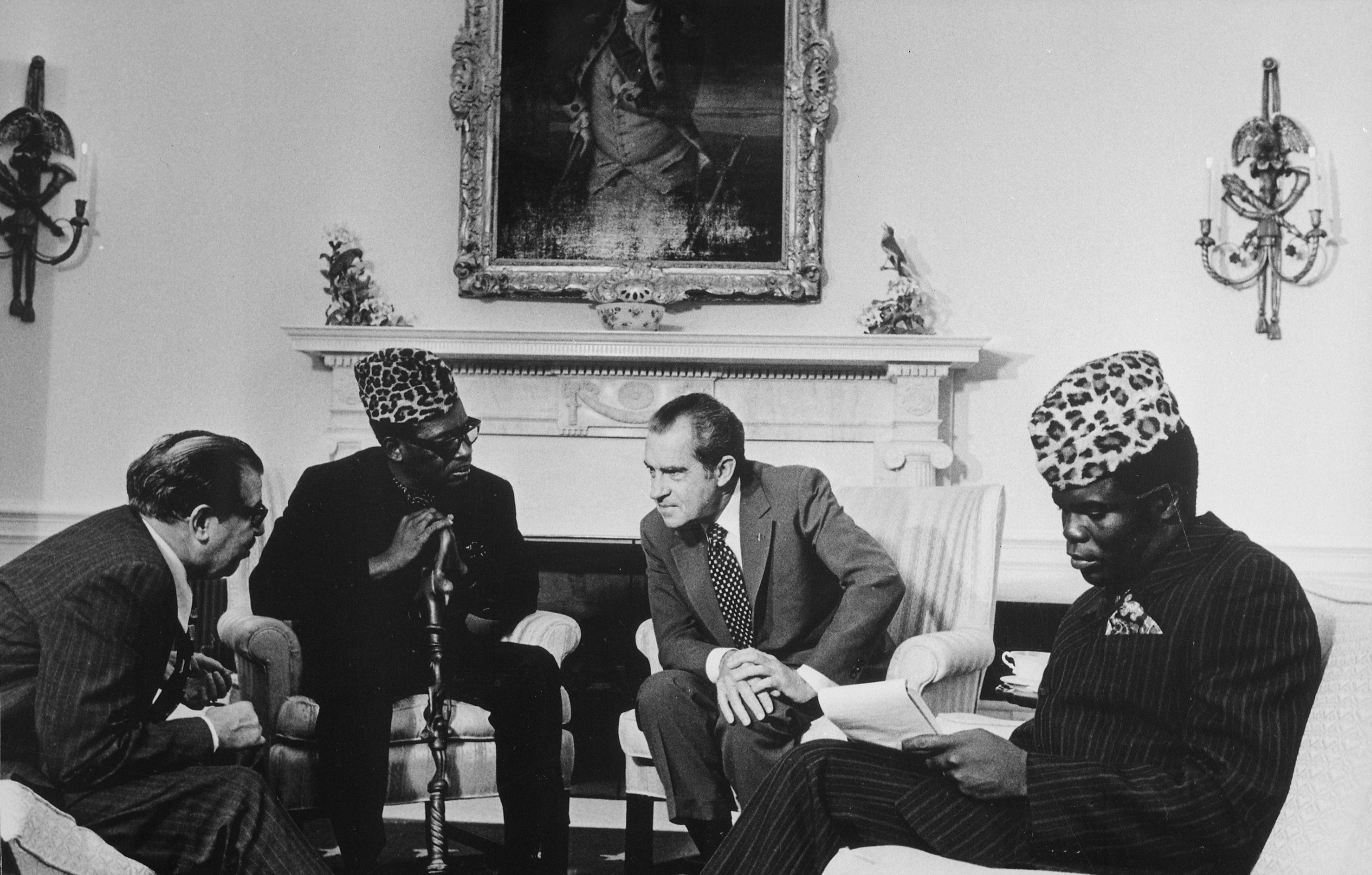
Mobutu Sese Seko and Richard Nixon in Washington, D.C., 1973

Mobutu had the staunch support of the United States because of his opposition to communism; the U.S. believed that his administration would serve as an effective counter to communist movements in Africa. A one-party system was established, and Mobutu declared himself head of state. He periodically held elections in which he was the only candidate. Although relative peace and stability were achieved, Mobutu's government was marked by severe human rights violations, political repression, a cult of personality, and corruption.

By late 1967, Mobutu had successfully neutralized his political opponents and rivals, either through co-opting them into his regime, arresting them, or rendering them otherwise politically impotent. Throughout the late 1960s, Mobutu continued to shuffle his governments and cycle officials in and out of the office to maintain control. Joseph Kasa-Vubu's death in April 1969 ensured that no person with credentials from the First Republic could challenge his rule. By the early 1970s, Mobutu was attempting to assert Zaire as a leading African nation. He traveled frequently across the continent while the government became more vocal about African issues, particularly those relating to the southern region. Zaire established semi-clientelist relationships with several smaller African states, especially Burundi, Chad, and Togo.

Corruption became so common the term "le mal Zairois", meaning "Zairian sickness", meaning gross corruption, theft and mismanagement, was coined, reportedly by Mobutu. Mobutu accumulated a large personal fortune through the diversion of state funds, foreign aid and revenue from natural resources, while Zaire remained impoverished and heavily indebted. Zaire became a kleptocracy.

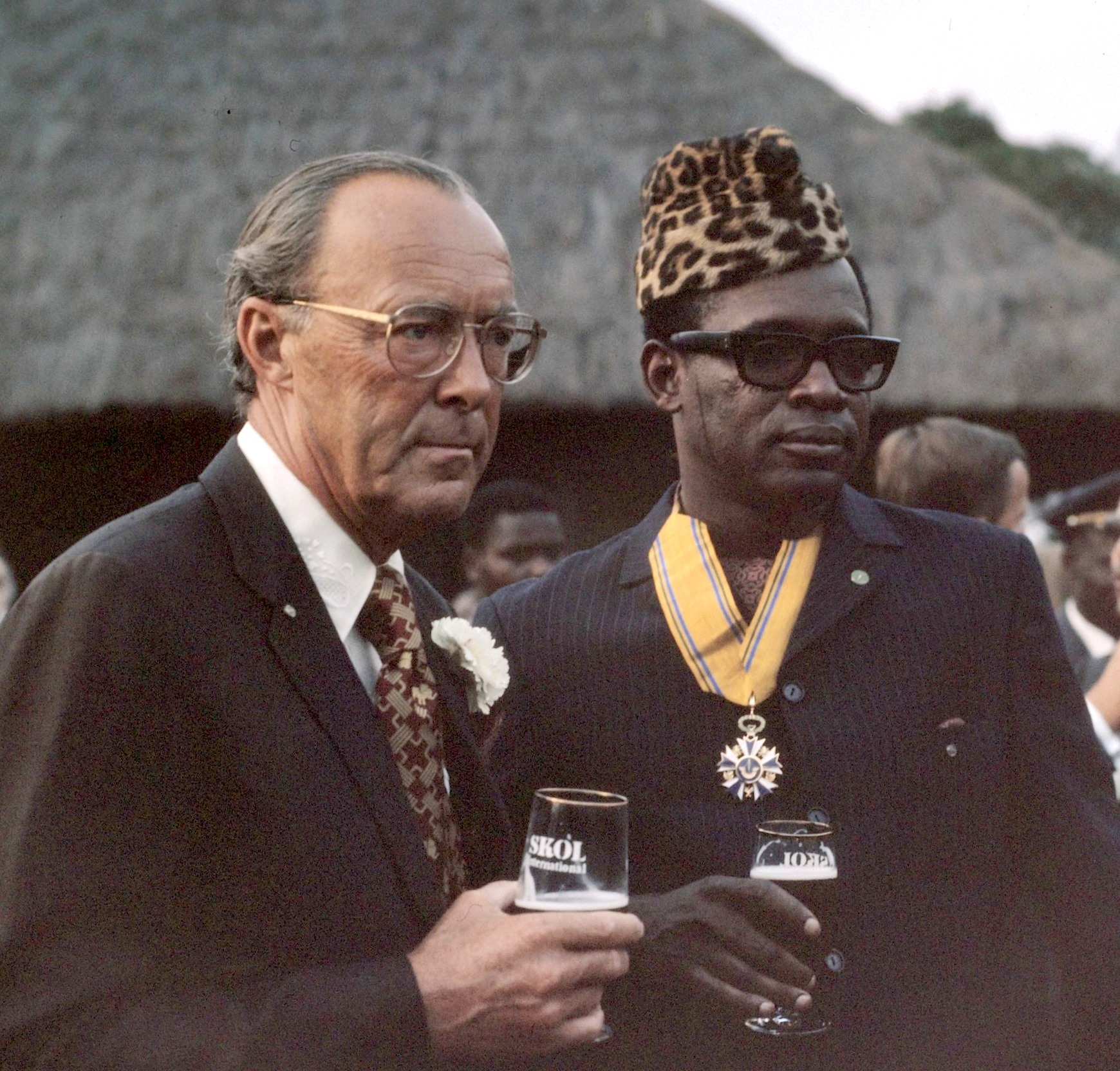
Mobutu with the Dutch Prince Bernhard in Kinshasa in 1973

In a campaign to identify himself with African nationalism, starting on 1 June 1966, Mobutu renamed the nation's cities: Léopoldville became Kinshasa (the country was known as Congo-Léopoldville), Stanleyville became Kisangani, Elisabethville became Lubumbashi, and Coquilhatville became Mbandaka. In 1971, Mobutu renamed the country the "Republic of Zaire", its fourth name change in eleven years and its sixth overall. The Congo River was renamed the Zaire River.

In the 1970s and 1980s, Mobutu was invited to visit the U.S. on several occasions, meeting with U.S. presidents Richard Nixon, Ronald Reagan and George H. W. Bush. Following the dissolution of the Soviet Union, U.S. relations with Mobutu cooled, as he was no longer deemed necessary as a Cold War ally. Opponents within Zaire stepped up demands for reform. This atmosphere contributed to Mobutu's declaring the Third Republic in 1990, whose constitution was supposed to pave the way for democratic reform. The reforms turned out to be largely cosmetic. Mobutu continued his rule until the armed forces forced him to flee into exile in 1997. From 1990 to 1993, the United States supported Mobutu's efforts to obstruct political transition, and later also backed Laurent-Désiré Kabila's rebellion, which brought down Mobutu's regime."

In September 1997, Mobutu died in exile in Morocco.

=== Continental and civil wars (1996–2007) ===
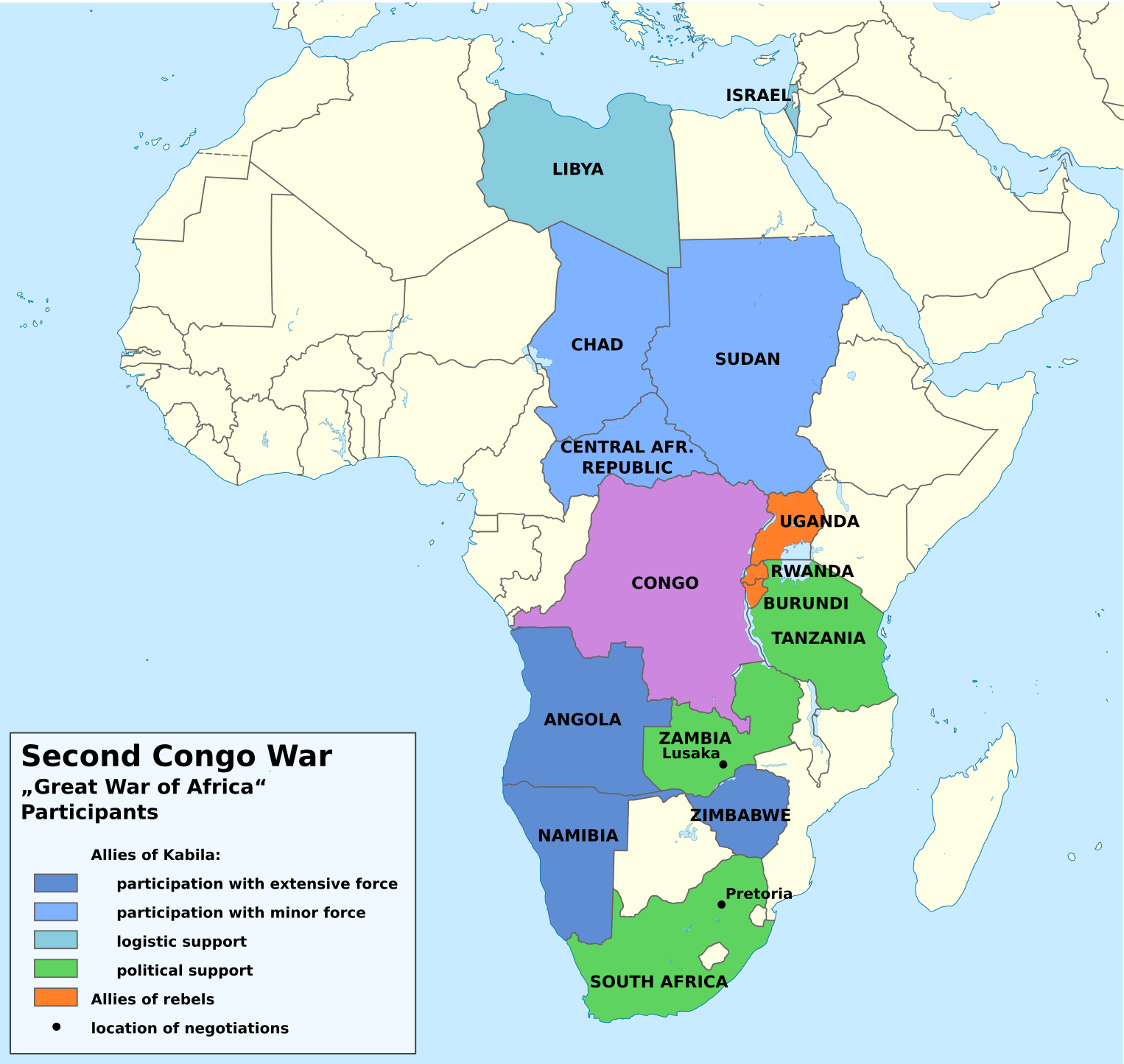
Belligerents of the Second Congo War, also known as Africa's World War.

By 1996, following the Rwandan Civil War and genocide, and the ascension of a Tutsi-led government in Rwanda, Rwandan Hutu militia forces (Interahamwe) fled to eastern Zaire and used refugee camps as bases for incursions against Rwanda. They allied with the Zairian Armed Forces to launch a campaign against Congolese ethnic Tutsis in eastern Zaire.

A coalition of Rwandan and Ugandan armies invaded Zaire to overthrow the government of Mobutu, launching the First Congo War. The coalition allied with some opposition figures, led by Laurent-Désiré Kabila, becoming the Alliance of Democratic Forces for the Liberation of the Congo. In 1997 Mobutu fled the country and Kabila marched into Kinshasa, naming himself president and reverting the name of the country to the Democratic Republic of the Congo.

Kabila later requested that foreign military forces return to their own countries. Rwandan troops retreated to Goma and launched a new Tutsi-led rebel military movement called the Rally for Congolese Democracy to fight Kabila, while Uganda instigated the creation of a rebel movement called the Movement for the Liberation of the Congo, led by Congolese warlord Jean-Pierre Bemba. The two rebel movements, along with Rwandan and Ugandan troops, started the Second Congo War by attacking the Congolese army in 1998. Angolan, Zimbabwean, and Namibian troops entered the war on the side of the Congolese government.

Kabila was assassinated in 2001. His son Joseph Kabila succeeded him and called for multilateral peace talks. UN peacekeepers, then known as MONUC and now known as MONUSCO, arrived in April 2001. From 2002 to 2003, Bemba intervened in the Central African Republic on behalf of its then president, Ange-Félix Patassé. Talks led to a peace accord under which Kabila would share power with former rebels, implemented between 2002 and 2003. The most widely reported estimate for the death toll during the Second Congo War is 5.4 million people, though other estimates put it at 3 million. It has been described as the deadliest conflict since World War II.

By June 2003 all foreign armies except those of Rwanda had pulled out of the Congo. A transitional government was set up until an election was held. A constitution was approved by voters; further, on 30 July 2006, DRC held its first multi-party elections. These were the first free national elections since 1960, which many believed would mark the end to violence in the region. However, an election-result dispute between Kabila and Bemba turned into a skirmish between their supporters in Kinshasa. MONUC took control of the city. The second round of the election took place in October 2006, which Kabila won, and in December 2006 he was sworn in as president.

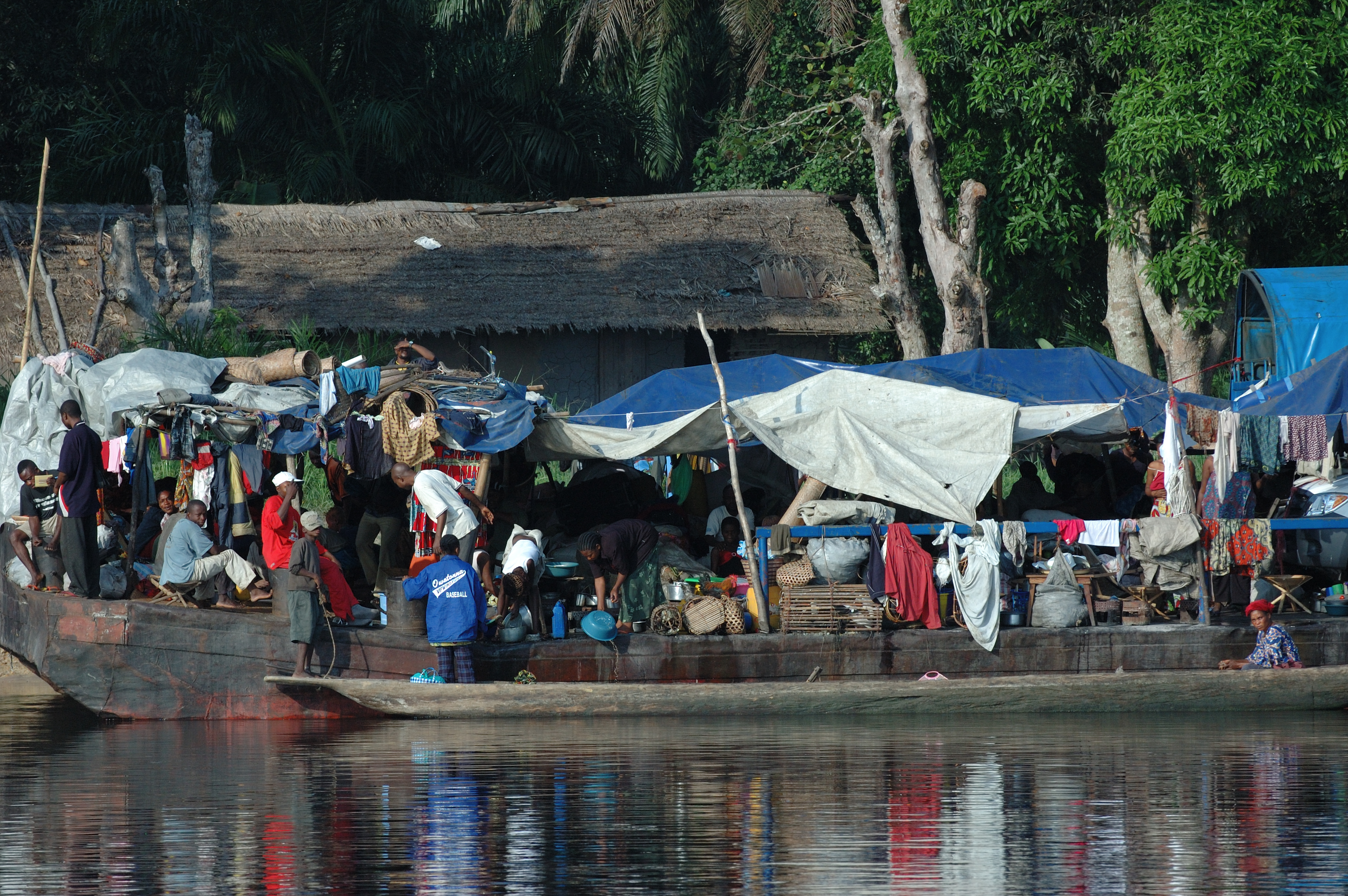
Refugees in the Congo

=== Continued conflicts (2008–2018) ===
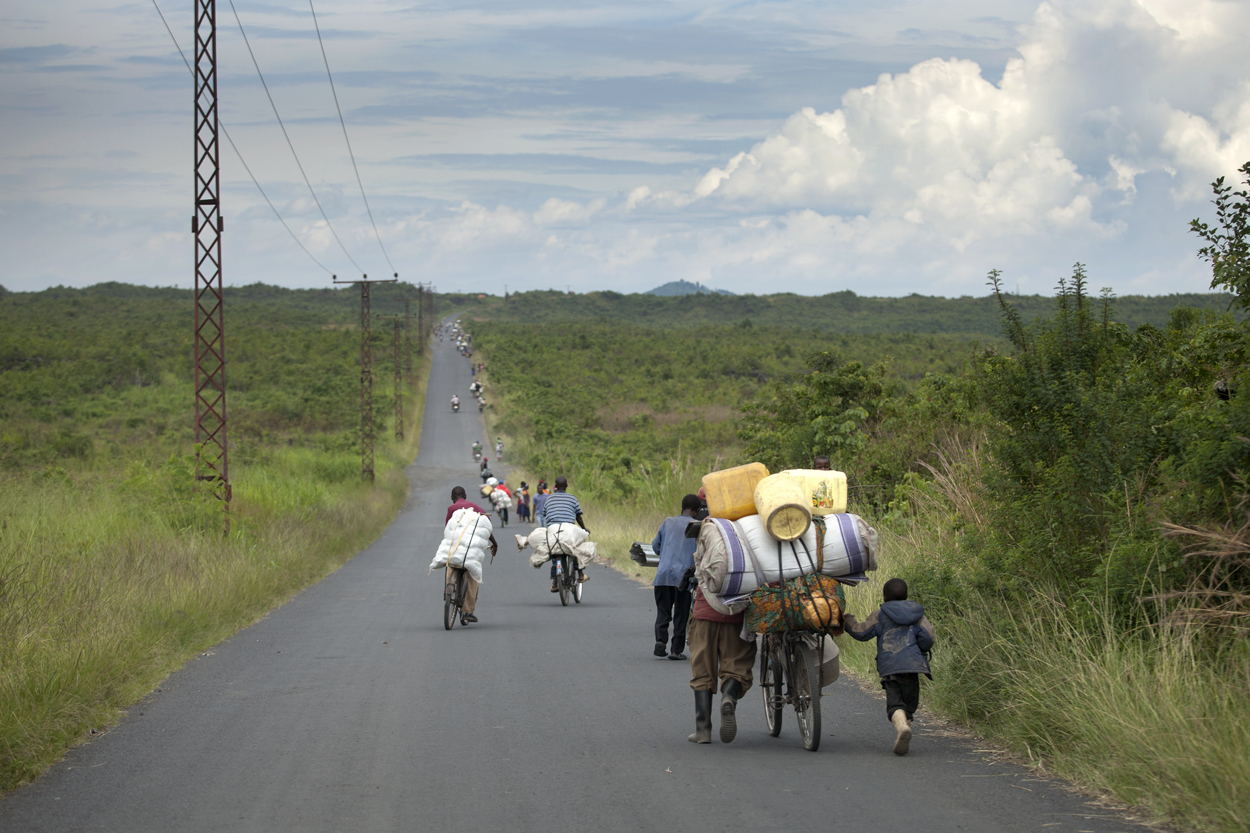
People fleeing their villages due to fighting between FARDC and rebel groups, North Kivu, 2012

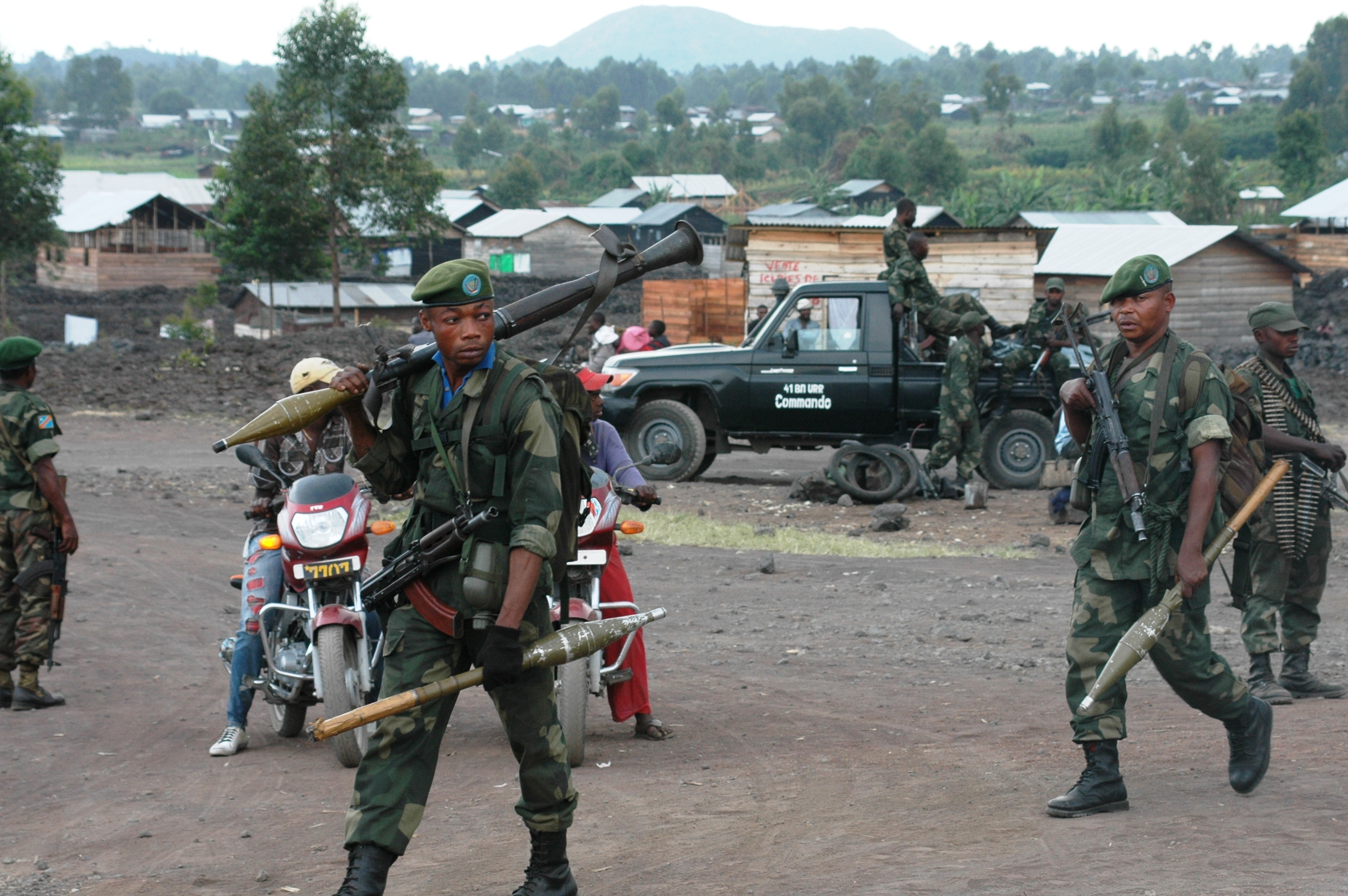
Government troops near Goma during the M23 rebellion in May 2013

Laurent Nkunda, a member of Rally for Congolese Democracy–Goma, defected along with troops loyal to him and formed the National Congress for the Defence of the People (CNDP), which began an armed rebellion against the government. In March 2009, after a deal between the DRC and Rwanda, Rwandan troops entered the DRC and arrested Nkunda and were allowed to pursue FDLR militants. The CNDP signed a peace treaty with the government in which it agreed to become a political party and to have its soldiers integrated into the national army in exchange for the release of its imprisoned members. In 2012 Bosco Ntaganda, the leader of the CNDP, and troops loyal to him, mutinied and briefly captured the provincial capital of Goma in November 2012.

Neighboring countries have been accused of arming rebel groups and using them as proxies to gain control of the resource-rich country. In March 2013, the United Nations Security Council authorized the United Nations Force Intervention Brigade to neutralize armed groups. In 2013, the Mai-Mai created by Laurent Kabila briefly invaded the provincial capital of Lubumbashi and 400,000 people are displaced in the province as of 2013. On and off fighting in the Ituri conflict occurred between the Nationalist and Integrationist Front and the Union of Congolese Patriots. In the northeast, Joseph Kony's Lord's Resistance Army moved from their original bases in Uganda and South Sudan to DR Congo in 2005 and set up camps in the Garamba National Park.

In 2015, major protests broke out across the country and protesters demanded that Kabila step down as president. On 27 November 2016 Congolese foreign minister Raymond Tshibanda told the press no elections would be held in 2016: "it has been decided that the voter registration operation will end on July 31, 2017, and that election will take place in April 2018". Protests broke out in the country on 20 December when Kabila's term in office ended. Across the country, dozens of protesters were killed and hundreds were arrested.

Human Rights Watch said in 2017 that Kabila recruited former 23 March Movement fighters to put down country-wide protests over his refusal to step down from office at the end of his term. "M23 fighters patrolled the streets of the Congo's main cities, firing on or arresting protesters or anyone else deemed to be a threat to the president", they said. Fierce fighting has erupted in Masisi between government forces and a powerful local warlord, General Delta. The United Nations mission in the DRC is its largest and most expensive peacekeeping effort, but it shut down five UN bases near Masisi in 2017, after the U.S. led a push to cut costs.

=== 2018 election and Tshisekedi presidency (2018–present) ===
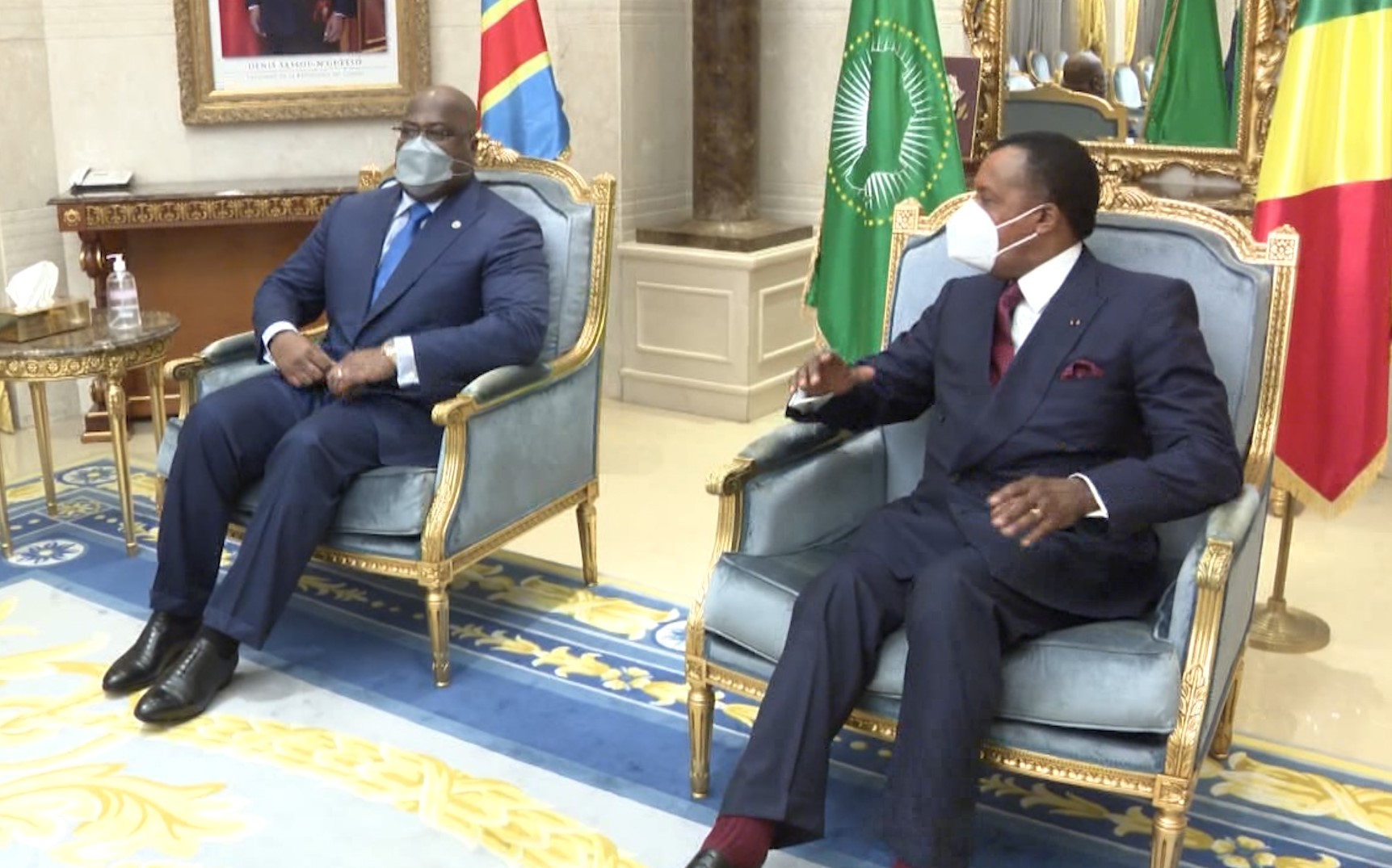
President Félix Tshisekedi with the president of neighbouring Republic of the Congo Denis Sassou Nguesso in 2020; both wear face masks due to the COVID-19 pandemic.

On 30 December 2018, a general election was held. The election was originally scheduled for 23 December, but was postponed after a warehouse fire destroyed several electronic voting machines, prompting concerns about potential tampering. Polling eventually opened on 30 December across most of the country, though voting remained suspended in certain areas—a measure officials said was intended to protect residents from an ongoing Ebola outbreak in eastern provinces.

After polls closed, the government imposed an internet blackout in some regions, announcing that service would be restored following the release of results, which had been slated for 6 January.

On 10 January 2019, the electoral commission announced opposition candidate Félix Tshisekedi as the winner of the presidential vote, and he was officially sworn in as president on 24 January. However, there were widespread suspicions that the results were rigged and that a deal had been made between Tshisekedi and Kabila, as professional election polls carried out on election day found that Martin Fayulu, the leading opposition candidate, was expected to take 47% of the vote, compared to 23% for Felix Tshisekedi and 19% for Emmanuel Shadary, Kabila's hand-picked successor.

In August 2019, six months after the inauguration of Félix Tshisekedi, a coalition government was announced. Tshisekedi succeeded in strengthening his hold on power, gaining the support of almost 400 out of 500 members of the National Assembly, the pro-Kabila speakers of both houses of parliament being forced out. In April 2021, the new government was formed without the supporters of Kabila.

A major measles outbreak in the country left nearly 5,000 dead in 2019. The Ebola outbreak ended in June 2020, after causing 2,280 deaths over two years. The COVID-19 pandemic also reached the DRC in March 2020, with a vaccination campaign beginning on 19 April 2021. The Italian ambassador to the DRC, Luca Attanasio, and his bodyguard were killed in North Kivu on 22 February 2021. On 22 April 2021, meetings between Kenyan President Uhuru Kenyatta and Tshisekedi resulted in new agreements increasing international trade and security (counterterrorism, immigration, cyber security, and customs) between the two countries. In February 2022, allegations of a coup d'état in the country led to uncertainty, but the coup attempt failed. In December 2023, President Felix Tshisekedi won reelection with more than 70% of the vote.

The M23 Movement had a resurgence in 2022 and received military assistance from Rwanda, which accused the Congolese government of supporting the FDLR Hutu militia. In early 2025, the conflict escalated with the M23 capture of Goma and Bukavu, involving thousands of Rwandan troops. Peace negotiations between Rwanda and the DRC brokered by the United States took place in the spring of 2025, and culminated in the signing of a peace deal on 27 June 2025. The peace agreement calls for the withdrawal of Rwandan troops from eastern Congo within 90 days and the end of the DRC's support for the FDLR, along with the creation of a regional economic integration framework for the two countries.

Despite the treaty, the United Nations Humans Rights Office (UNHRO) found that hostilities in the provinces where Goma and Bukavu are located, increased during the period from January to July 2025. UNHRO found that M23, along with the occupying Rwandan Defense Force (RDF) soldiers allegedly massacred hundreds of civilians in four villages within Rutshuru, a region within North Kivu province. In July 2025, a Declaration of Principles was signed in Doha as a first agreement on shared objectives for a ceasefire, and to limit future violence in the conflict. In October 2025, former president Joseph Kabila was sentenced to death in absentia for alleged collaboration with the rebel group M23.

== Geography ==
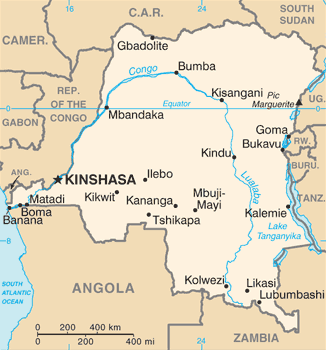
A map of the Democratic Republic of the Congo

A Köppen climate classification map of the DRC

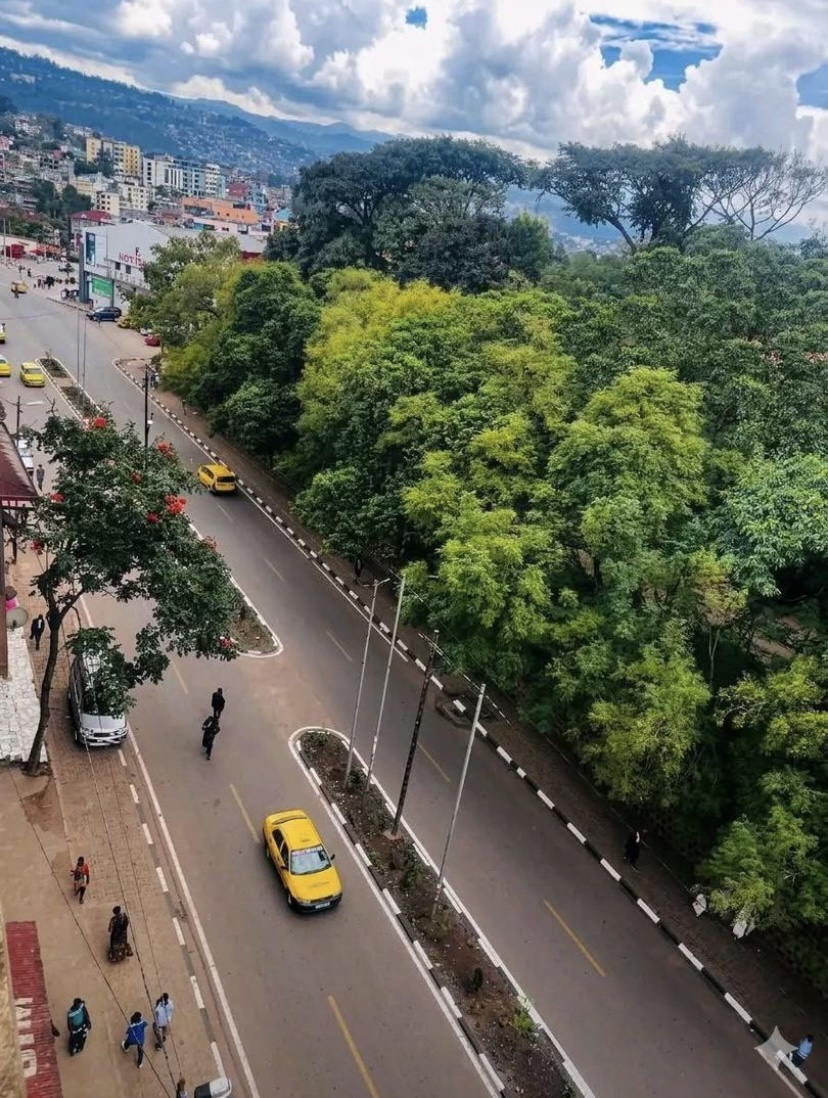
Bukavu, the capital of South Kivu province

The DRC is located in central sub-Saharan Africa, bordered to the northwest by the Republic of the Congo, to the north by the Central African Republic, to the northeast by South Sudan, to the east by Uganda, Rwanda and Burundi, and by Tanzania (across Lake Tanganyika), to the south and southeast by Zambia, to the southwest by Angola, and to the west by the South Atlantic Ocean and the Cabinda exclave of Angola. The DRC lies between latitudes 6°N and 14°S, and longitudes 12°E and 32°E. It straddles the Equator, with one-third to the north and two-thirds to the south. With an area of 2,345,408 square kilometres (905,567 sq mi), it is the second-largest country in Africa by area, after Algeria.

As a result of its equatorial location, the DRC has high precipitation and has the highest frequency of thunderstorms in the world. The annual rainfall can total upwards of 2,000 millimetres (80 in) in some places. The DRC sustains the Congo rainforest, the second-largest rainforest in the world after the Amazon rainforest. This massive expanse of lush jungle covers most of the vast, low-lying central basin of the river, which slopes toward the Atlantic Ocean in the west. This area is surrounded by plateaus merging into savannas in the south and southwest, by mountainous terraces in the west, and dense grasslands extending beyond the Congo River in the north. The glaciated Rwenzori Mountains are found in the extreme eastern region.

The tropical climate produced the Congo River system which dominates the region topographically along with the rainforest it flows through. The Congo Basin occupies nearly the entire country and an area of nearly 1,000,000 km^{2} (390,000 sq mi). The river and its tributaries form the backbone of Congolese economics and transportation. Major tributaries include the Kasai, Sangha, Ubangi, Ruzizi, Aruwimi, and Lulonga.

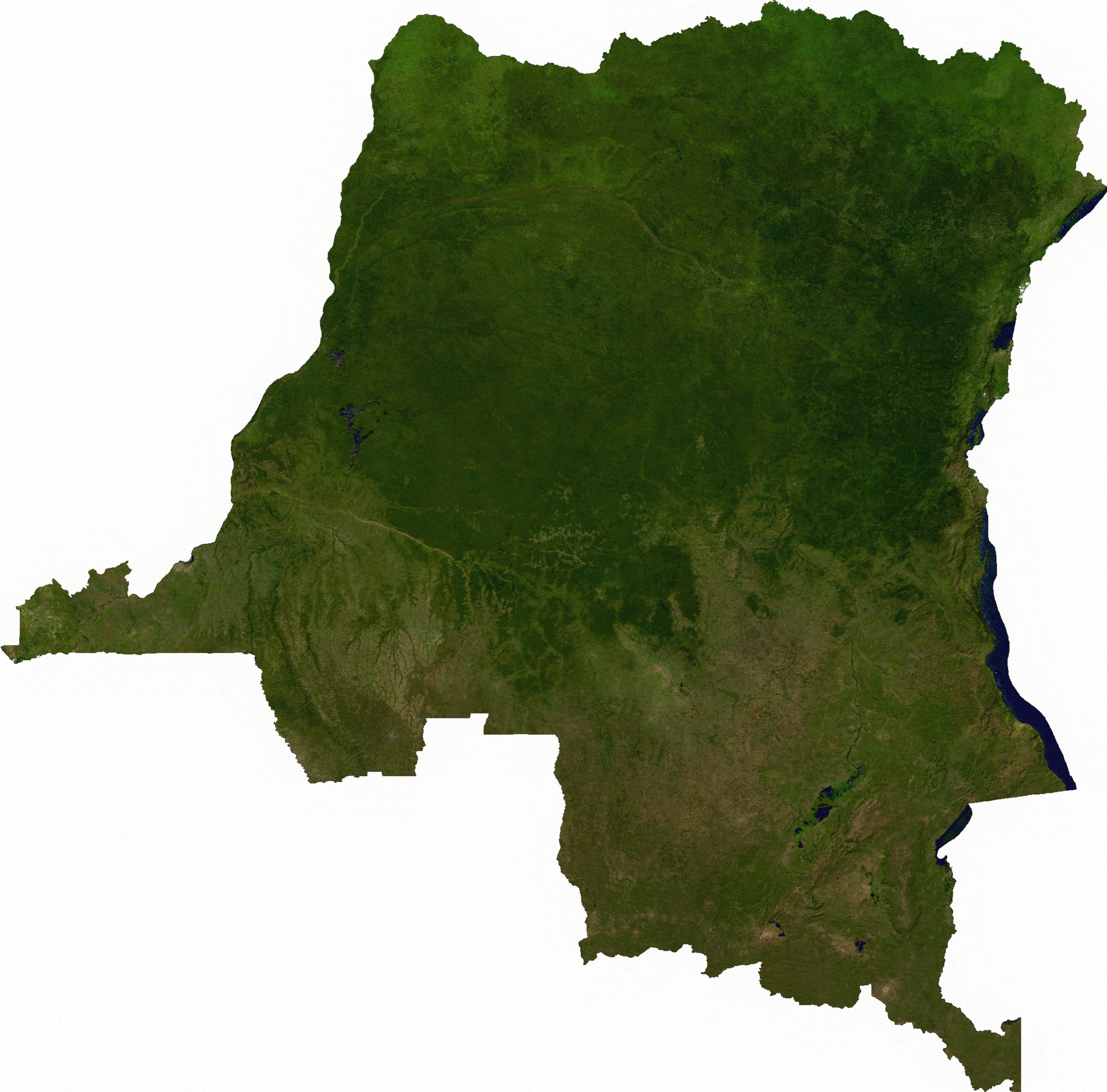
A satellite image of the Democratic Republic of the Congo

The Congo River has the second-largest flow and the second-largest watershed of any river in the world, behind the Amazon in both respects. The sources of the Congo River are in the Albertine Rift Mountains that flank the western branch of the East African Rift, as well as Lake Tanganyika and Lake Mweru. The river flows generally west from Kisangani just below Boyoma Falls, then gradually bends southwest, passing by Mbandaka, joining with the Ubangi River, and running into the Pool Malebo (Stanley Pool). Kinshasa and Brazzaville are on opposite sides of the river at the Pool. Then the river narrows and falls through a number of cataracts in deep canyons, collectively known as the Livingstone Falls, and runs past Boma into the Atlantic Ocean. The river and a 37-kilometre-wide (23 mi) strip of coastline on its north bank provide the country's only outlet to the Atlantic.

The Albertine Rift plays a key role in shaping the Congo's geography. The northeastern section of the country much more mountainous. Tectonic movement results in volcanic activity, occasionally with loss of life. The geologic activity in this area created the African Great Lakes, four of which lie on the Congo's eastern frontier: Lake Albert, Lake Kivu, Lake Edward, and Lake Tanganyika.

The rift valley has exposed an enormous amount of mineral wealth throughout the south and east of the Congo, making it accessible to mining. Cobalt, copper, cadmium, industrial and gem-quality diamonds, gold, silver, zinc, manganese, tin, germanium, uranium, radium, bauxite, iron ore, and coal are all found in plentiful supply, especially in the Congo's southeastern Katanga region. The gold production in 2015 was 37 metric tonnes.

On 17 January 2002, Mount Nyiragongo erupted, with three streams of extremely fluid lava running out at 64 km/h (40 mph) and 46 m (50 yd) wide. One of the three streams flowed directly through Goma, killing 45 people and leaving 120,000 homeless. Over 400,000 people were evacuated from the city during the eruption. The lava flowed into and poisoned the water of Lake Kivu killing its plants, animals and fish. Only two planes left the local airport because of the possibility of the explosion of stored petrol. The lava flowed through and past the airport, destroying a runway and trapping several parked airplanes. Six months after the event, nearby Mount Nyamuragira also erupted. The mountain erupted again in 2006, and in January 2010.

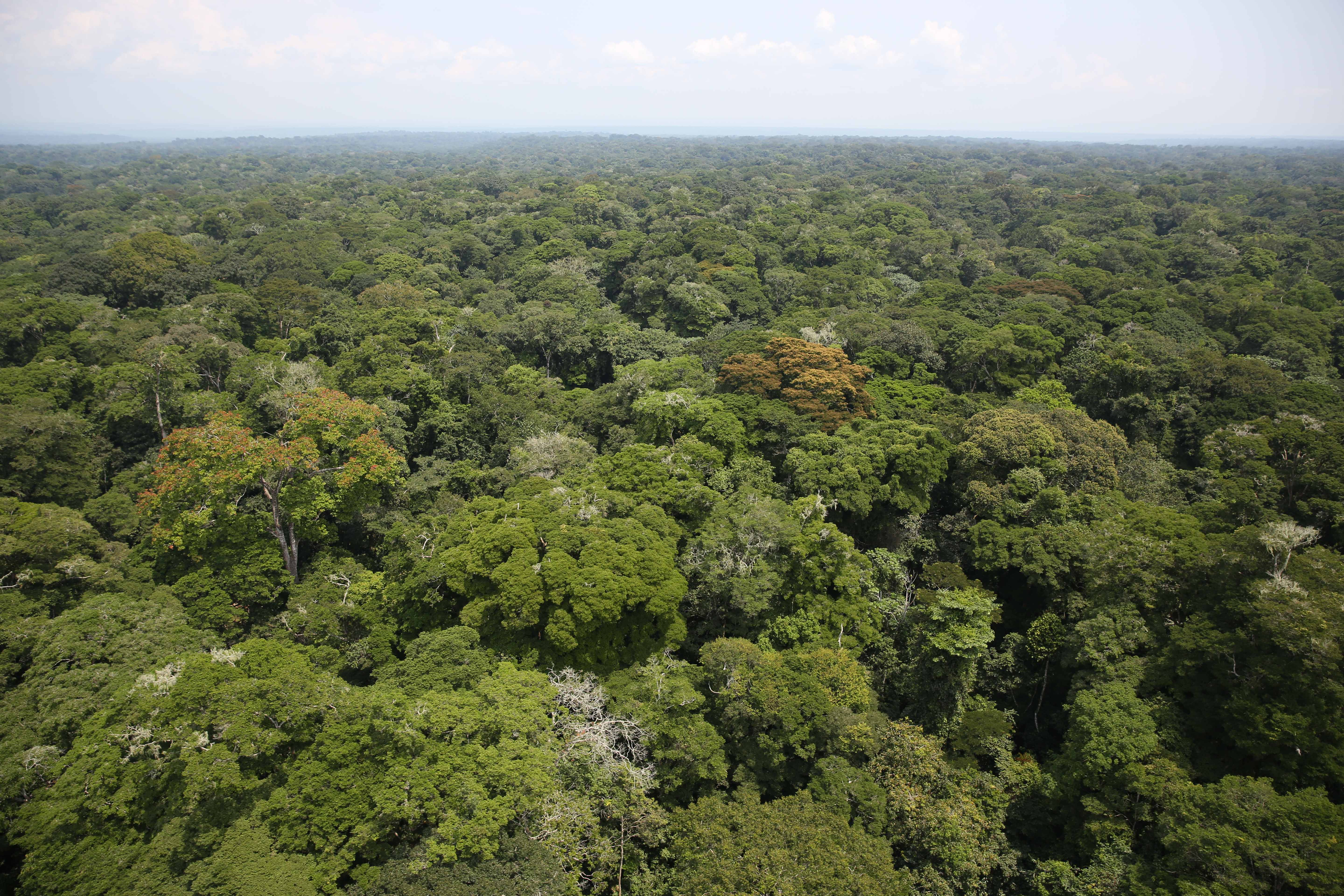
Ituri Rainforest

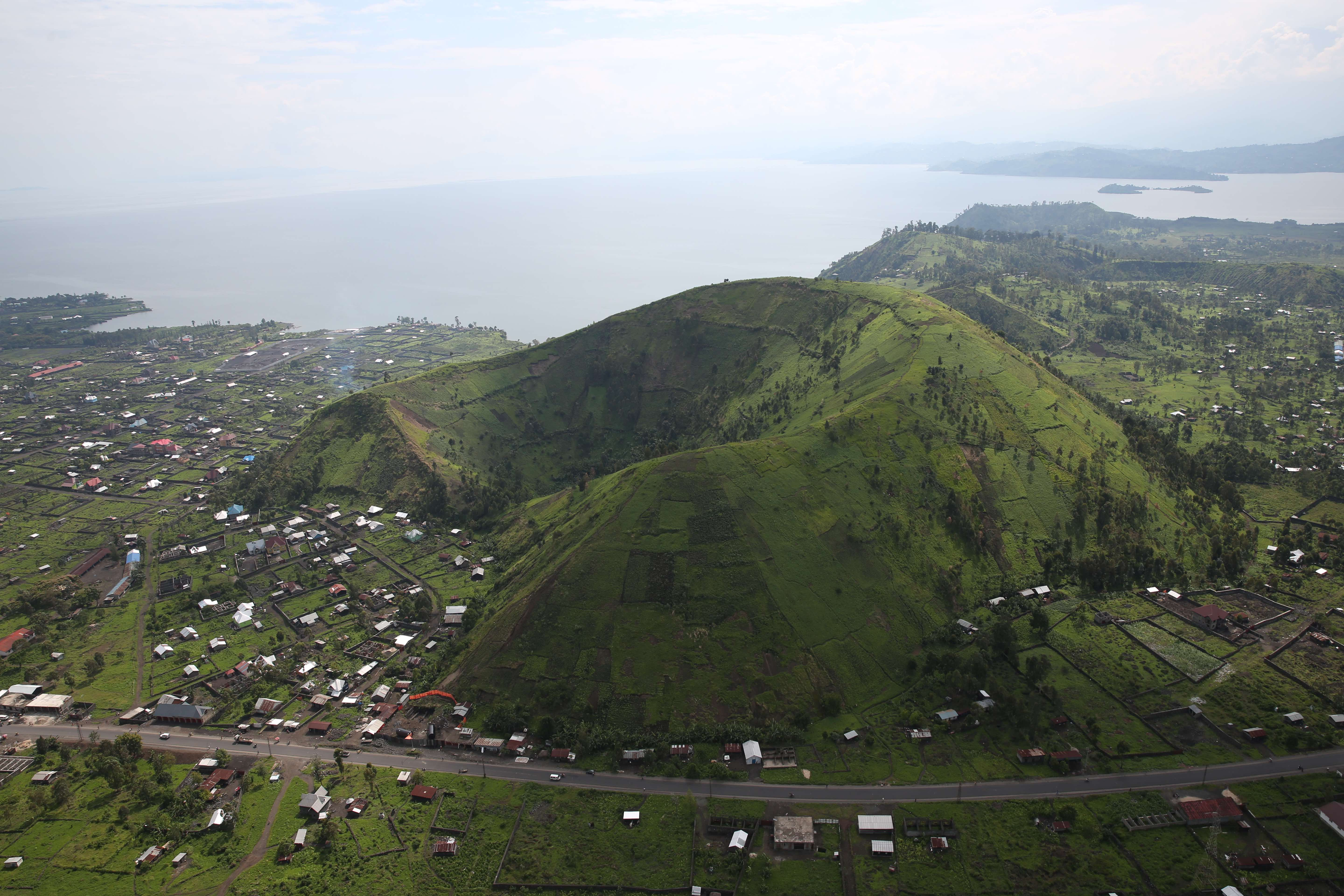
Lake Kivu in North Kivu province

=== Climate change ===
As of 2023, the DRC is the 18th highest emitting nation of greenhouse gases and the highest emitter on the African continent. The majority of these emissions arise from land use change and deforestation, as the country uses little fossil fuel and only one-fifth of the population has access to electricity. The DRC is one of the most vulnerable nations to climate change and the least prepared to deal with its impacts. Climate change in the DRC is predicted to cause more frequent and intense floods, droughts and exacerbated disease epidemics. Sectors vulnerable to climate change include agriculture, forestry and energy.

=== Biodiversity and conservation ===
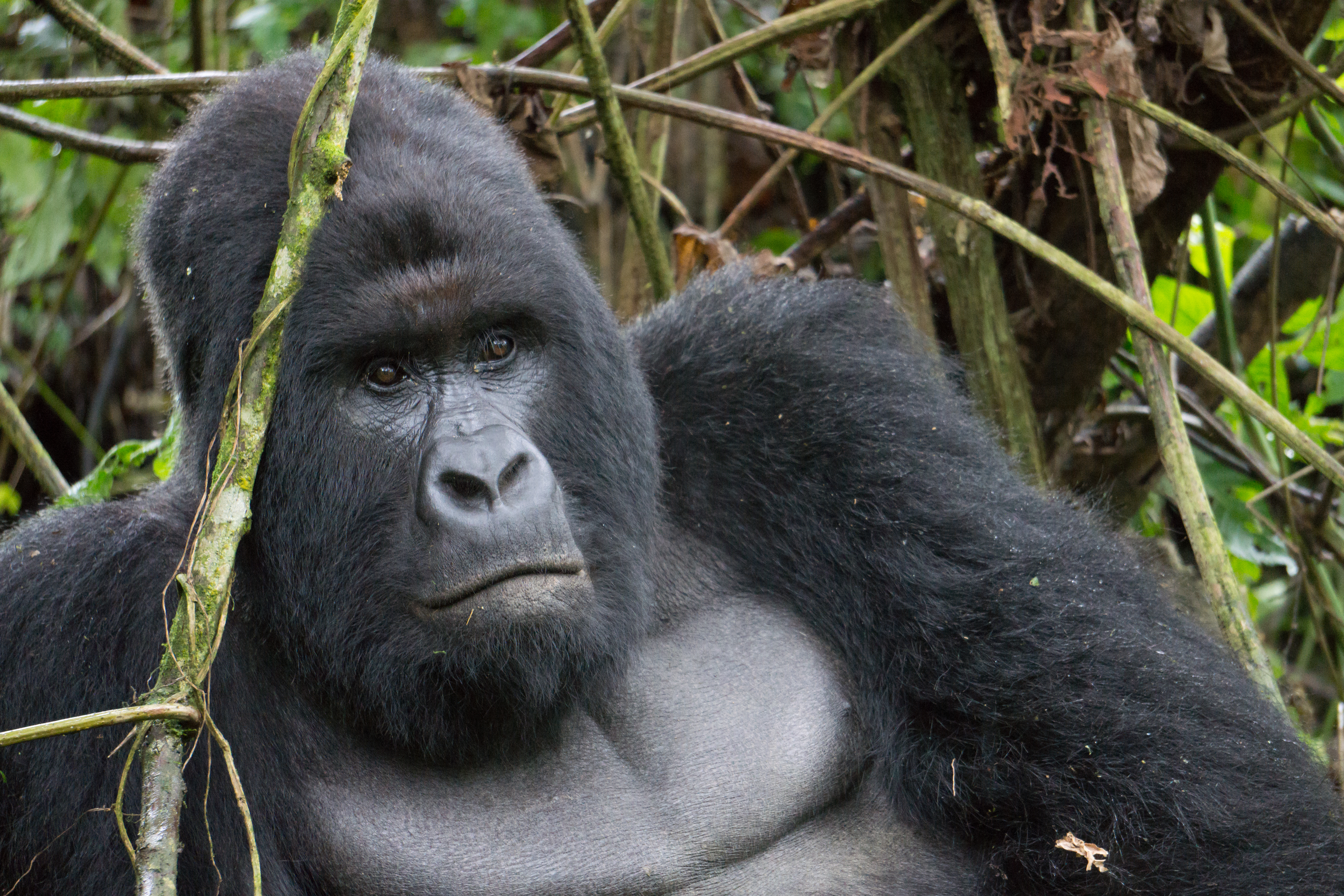
The endangered mountain gorilla; half of its population live in the DRC's Virunga National Park, making the park a critical habitat for those animals.

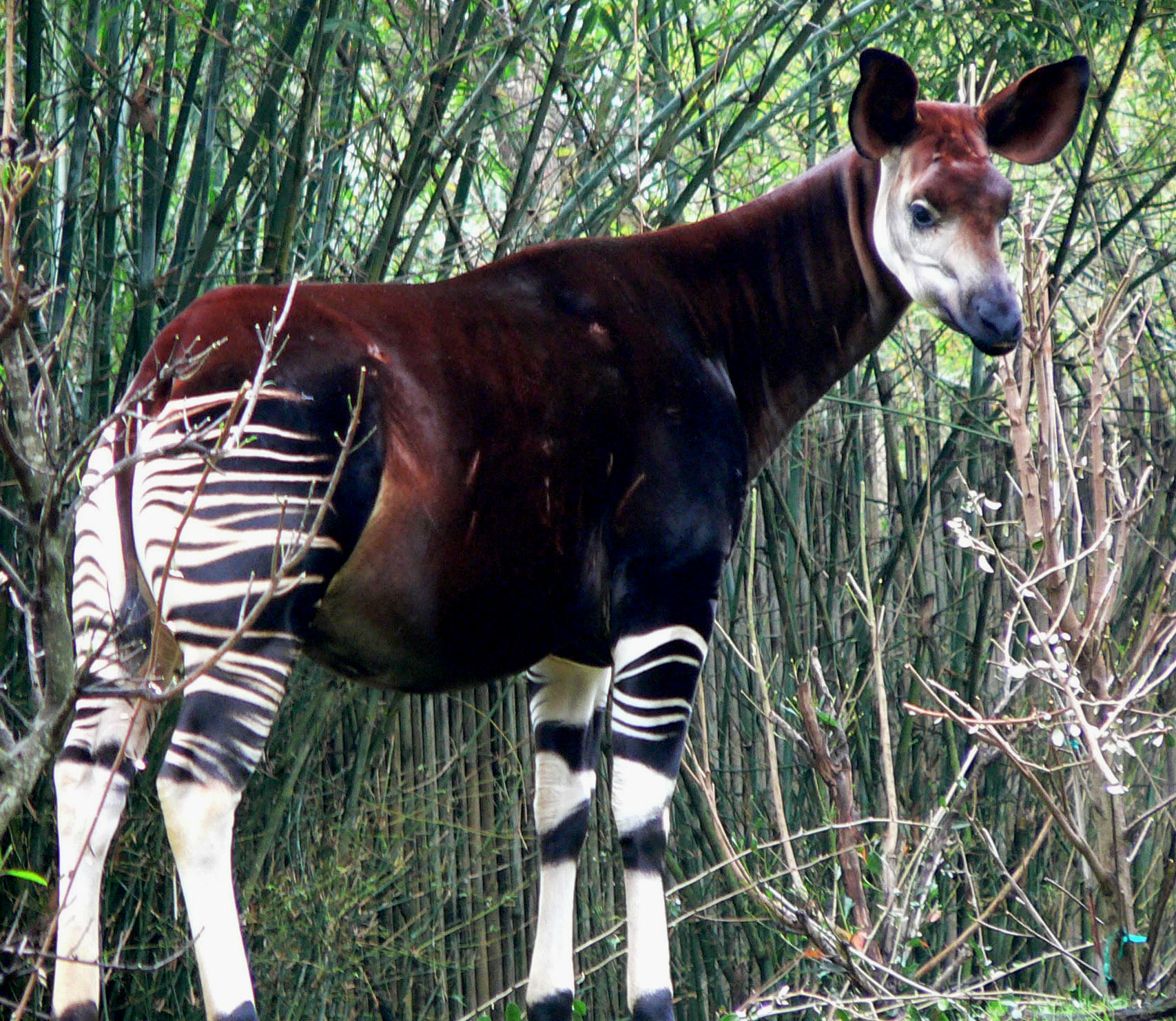
Found in the Congolian rainforests, the okapi was unknown to science until 1901.

The rainforests of the Democratic Republic of the Congo are the second-largest in the world, spanning 155 million hectares, and contain great biodiversity. There are over 10,000 animal species, including many rare and endemic ones, such as the common chimpanzee and the bonobo, the African forest elephant, mountain gorilla, okapi, forest buffalo, leopard and, further south in the country, the southern white rhinoceros. Five of the country's national parks are listed as World Heritage Sites: the Garumba, Kahuzi-Biega, Salonga and Virunga National Parks, and the Okapi Wildlife Reserve. The Democratic Republic of the Congo is one of 17 Megadiverse countries and is the most biodiverse African country.

Conservationists have particularly worried about primates. The Congo is inhabited by several great ape species: the common chimpanzee (Pan troglodytes), the bonobo (Pan paniscus), the eastern gorilla (Gorilla beringei), and possibly a population of the western gorilla (Gorilla gorilla). It is the only country in the world in which bonobos are found in the wild. Much concern has been raised about great ape extinction. Because of hunting and habitat destruction, the numbers of chimpanzee, bonobo and gorilla (each of whose populations once numbered in the millions) have now dwindled down to only about 200,000 gorillas, 100,000 chimpanzees and possibly only about 10,000 bonobos. The gorillas, chimpanzee, bonobo, and okapi are all classified as endangered by the World Conservation Union.

Major environmental issues in DRC include deforestation, poaching, which threatens wildlife populations, water pollution and mining. From 2015 to 2019, the rate of deforestation in the Democratic Republic of the Congo doubled. In 2021, deforestation of the Congolian rainforests increased by 5%. In 2023, the rate of deforestation in the DRC was the highest in Africa. The causes include slash-and-burn agriculture and illegal logging.

In January 2025, the DRC government established the Kivu-Kinshasa Green Corridor an initiative whose stated aim was to protect a large portion of the Congo Basin forest while supporting sustainable economic development.

== Government and politics ==
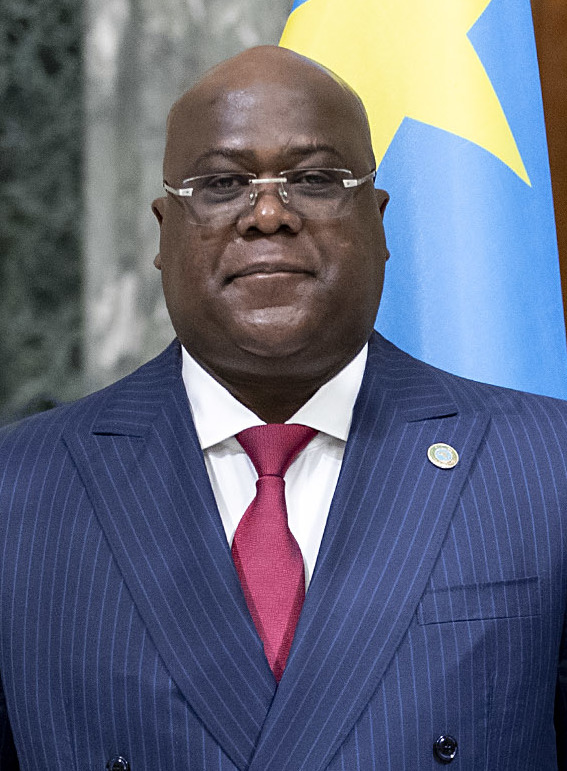
Félix Tshisekedi,
president since 2019

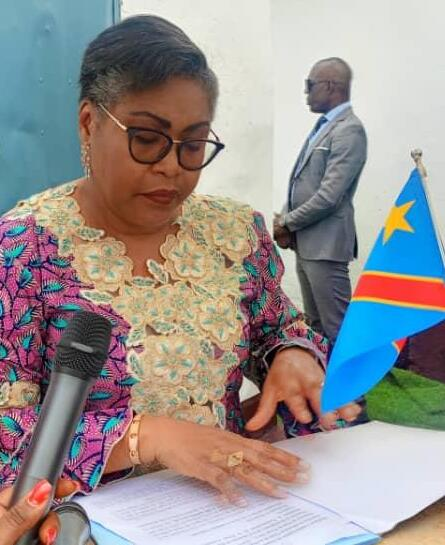
Judith Suminwa,
prime minister since 2024

The Democratic Republic of the Congo is, constitutionally, a unitary and semi-presidential republic in which the president is the head of state, elected by universal suffrage to a term of five years. The prime minister is the head of government appointed by the president with the support of the parliament. The prime minister and the cabinet, known as the government, are responsible to the legislature rather than to the president. The parliament is a bicameral legislature consisting of the Senate and the National Assembly.

Deputies of the National Assembly are directly elected for a term of five years. Senators are elected indirectly by provincial legislatures, also for a term of five years. The president is the commander-in-chief of the armed forces and appoints government and military officials. The constitution is the basis for an independent judiciary, consisting of the Constitutional Court to evaluate the constitutionality of laws and to settle disputes regarding elections or the separation of powers; the Court of Cassation as the court of last resort in the civil and military judicial system; and the Council of State as the highest administrative court.

The DRC's political system is considered to be authoritarian and scores low on rankings of democracy, political rights, and civil liberties. Despite the constitution providing for the separation of executive, legislative, and judicial powers, in practice the president and his associates have dominated the political system. Freedom House rates the country as "not free" in 2025, citing endemic corruption, the manipulation of the political system, and human rights abuses, including by security forces. The Economist Democracy Index described the DRC as an "authoritarian regime" in 2024, ranking it 156 out of the 167 countries that it evaluated.

The DRC was ranked 163 out of 180 countries in the Corruption Perceptions Index for 2024. Administrative institutions remain weak, especially in rural areas, undermining the ability of government to provide basic services to the population. The state has also struggled to extend its administration over the country's entire territory. The Fragile States Index ranked the DRC the 5th most fragile country in the world, out of 179 countries, as of 2024.

During the presidency of Joseph Kabila from 2001 to 2019, the government was marked by corruption, a lack of transparency, and human rights violations. Kabila remained in office beyond his constitutional mandate, which ended in 2016, by delaying an election. After it was held in late 2018, Kabila was succeeded by Félix Tshisekedi in the DRC's first peaceful transition of power since independence. The election is widely seen as having been rigged in a deal made between Kabila and Tshisekedi. Tshisekedi was reelected in late 2023, and after negotiations appointed Judith Suminwa as prime minister in 2024, the first woman to hold the post.

The current political system is known as the Third Republic, declared by Laurent-Désiré Kabila at his presidential inauguration in May 1997. Apart from changing the country's name from Zaire back to the DR Congo and restoring its previous symbols, Kabila's government made few changes from the dictatorship of Mobutu Sese Seko. After the Second Congo War (1998–2003), during which Laurent-Désiré Kabila was assassinated, a transitional constitution was adopted in April 2003 as part of the peace process. It was replaced by the current constitution, the Constitution of the Third Republic, which went into effect in February 2006. The current flag was also adopted.

The Transitional Government, led by Joseph Kabila, oversaw the creation of the current system: the first cabinet took office in June 2003, the two chambers of the parliament were organized in July 2003, a constitution was adopted by a referendum in December 2005, and the country's first free election in over four decades was held in July 2006. Since the process of democratization began in 1990, more than 600 registered political parties emerged in the DRC. Four of them—the UDPS, PPRD, UNC, and MLC—successfully operate across the entire country.

=== Administrative divisions ===
The DRC is divided into the city-province of Kinshasa and 25 provinces. The provinces are subdivided into 145 territories and 33 cities.

Provinces of the Democratic Republic of the Congo

1. Kinshasa
14. Ituri Province
2. Kongo Central
15. Haut-Uele
3. Kwango
16. Tshopo
4. Kwilu Province
17. Bas-Uele
5. Mai-Ndombe Province
18. Nord-Ubangi
6. Kasaï Province
19. Mongala
7. Kasaï-Central
20. Sud-Ubangi
8. Kasaï-Oriental
21. Équateur
9. Lomami Province
22. Tshuapa
10. Sankuru
23. Tanganyika Province
11. Maniema
24. Haut-Lomami
12. South Kivu
25. Lualaba Province
13. North Kivu
26. Haut-Katanga Province

=== Foreign relations ===
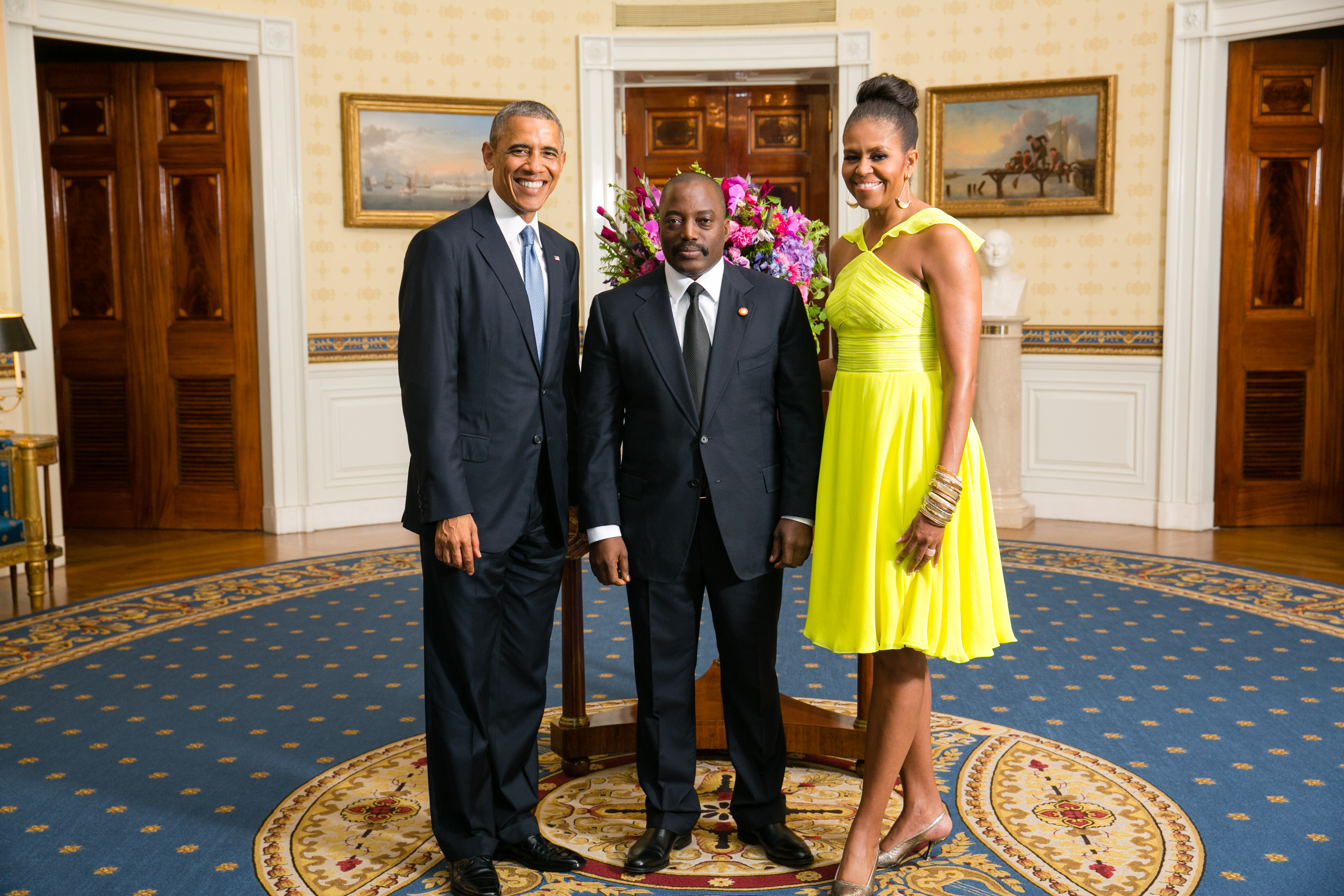
President Joseph Kabila with U.S. President Barack Obama in August 2014

There are economic and strategic incentives (for external countries) to bring more "security" to the Congo, which is rich in natural resources such as cobalt, a metal used in many industrial and military applications. The country possesses 80% of the world's cobalt reserves.

It is thought that due to the importance of cobalt for batteries for electric vehicles and stabilization of electric grids with large proportions of intermittent renewables in the electricity mix, the DRC could become an object of increased geopolitical competition.

In the 21st century, Chinese investment in the DRC and Congolese exports to China have grown rapidly. In July 2019, UN ambassadors of 37 countries, including DRC, have signed a joint letter to the UNHRC defending China's treatment of Uyghurs and other Muslim ethnic minorities. In 2021, President Félix Tshisekedi called for a review of mining contracts signed with China by his predecessor Joseph Kabila, in particular the Sicomines multibillion 'minerals-for-infrastructure' deal.

Although located in the Central African UN subregion, the nation is also economically and regionally affiliated with Southern Africa as a member of the Southern African Development Community (SADC).

=== Military ===
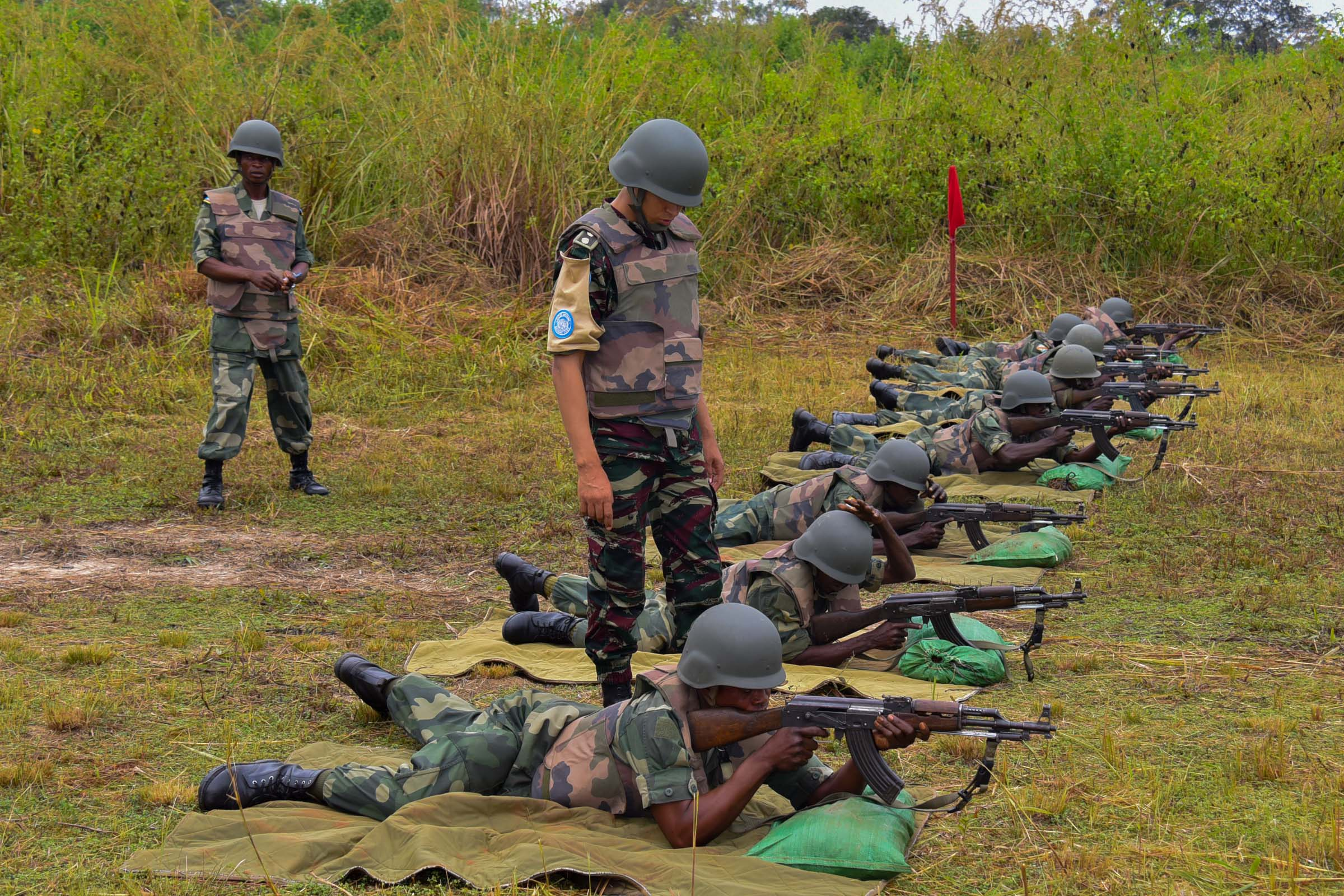
Congolese soldiers being trained by UN personnel

The military of the Democratic Republic of the Congo, known as the FARDC, consists of the Land Forces, the Air Force, and the Navy. There is also a separate Republican Guard that is outside of the FARDC command structure, being directly responsible to the president. In 2023 there were 103,000 soldiers in the Land Forces, 6,700 in the Navy, 2,550 in the Air Force, 14,000 in the central command, and 8,000 in the Republican Guard. All services together numbered 134,250 personnel, nominally making the FARDC the largest military in Central Africa. However, the FARDC has been undermined by low levels of professionalism, training, morale, pay, and equipment, along with rampant corruption. Its lack of vehicles and aircraft makes it difficult to move troops across the country's large territory.

The FARDC was established in 2003 after the end of the Second Congo War with the integration of many former rebel groups into its ranks, and it still works with pro-government militias. Since then it has been a diverse combination of the former Zairian armed forces, rebel groups from the Congo Wars, and other militias that were integrated more recently. President Félix Tshisekedi announced the beginning of military reforms in 2022 to create a more cohesive national army. This effort included replacing most of the high command with younger officers that had a record of success and providing more military spending for the years between 2022 and 2024. Despite this, the FARDC continues to be disorganized and has systematic corruption, preventing it from fulfilling its mission to effectively defend the country's entire territory.

The armed forces are organized into geographic joint commands known as defense zones, one each for the western, south-central, and eastern DRC, which are further divided into military regions. The Land Forces consist of brigades. In 2011, those in Eastern Congo were reorganized into regiments. In 2023, it was estimated that there are nine brigades, 27 regiments, one artillery battalion, and one military police battalion. Many units are reported to be at half of their official strength or less because of combat losses and desertions. The FARDC has spent decades fighting against over 100 armed groups in Eastern Congo and the Kasaï region, including local Mai-Mai militias, the Rwandan-backed 23 March Movement (M23), Nduma Defense of Congo-Renovated (NDC-R), the Allied Democratic Forces (which has become part of the Islamic State), and the Lord's Resistance Army.

=== Law enforcement, crime, and corruption ===
The Congolese National Police, known as the PNC, are the primary police force in the Democratic Republic of the Congo. The DRC has a civil law system primarily based on Belgian law, but also customary and tribal law. The country accepts the jurisdiction of the International Criminal Court, having ratified the Rome Statute on 11 April 2002. The Criminal Code, the Military Criminal Code, and the Code of Criminal Procedure were modified by the DRC's parliament on 31 December 2015 to be in compliance with the Rome Statute.

A relative of Mobutu explained how the government illicitly collected revenue during his rule: "Mobutu would ask one of us to go to the bank and take out a million. We'd go to an intermediary and tell him to get five million. He would go to the bank with Mobutu's authority and take out ten. Mobutu got one, and we took the other nine." Mobutu institutionalized corruption to prevent political rivals from challenging his control, leading to an economic collapse in 1996.

Mobutu allegedly amassed between US$50 million and $125 million during his rule. He was not the first corrupt Congolese leader by any means: "Government as a system of organized theft goes back to King Leopold II", noted Adam Hochschild in 2009. In July 2009, a Swiss court determined that the statute of limitations had run out on an international asset recovery case of about $6.7 million of deposits of Mobutu's in a Swiss bank, and therefore the assets should be returned to Mobutu's family.

President Kabila established the Commission of Repression of Economic Crimes upon his ascension to power in 2001. However, in 2016 the Enough Project issued a report claiming that the Congo is run as a violent kleptocracy.

In June 2020, a court in the Democratic Republic of the Congo found President Tshisekedi's chief of staff Vital Kamerhe guilty of corruption. He was sentenced to 20 years' hard labour, after facing charges of embezzling almost $50m (£39m) of public funds. He was the most high-profile figure to be convicted of corruption in the DRC. However, Kamerhe was released already in December 2021.

In November 2021, a judicial investigation targeting Kabila and his associates was opened in Kinshasa after revelations of alleged embezzlement of $138 million.

=== Human rights ===
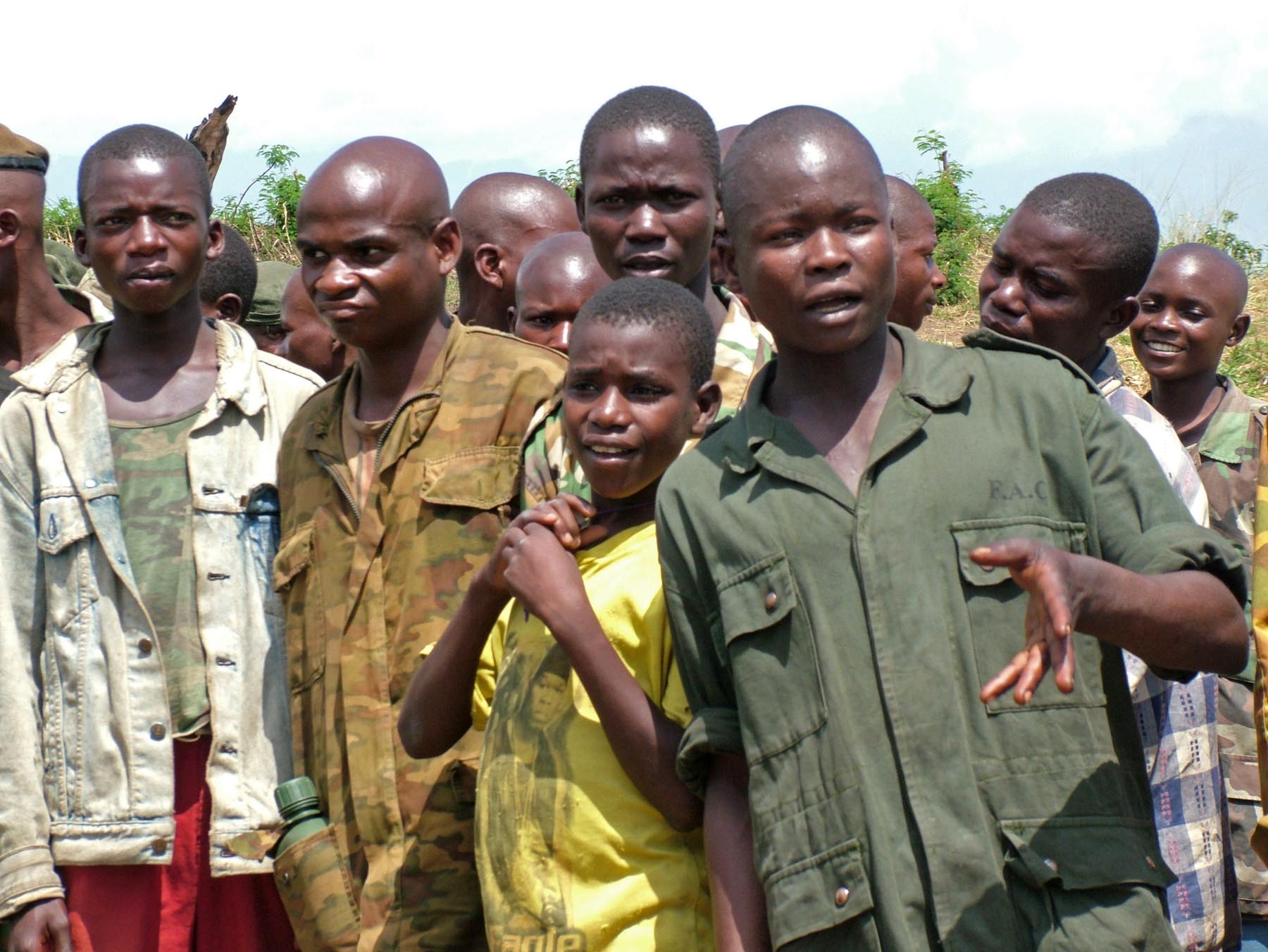
A group of demobilized child soldiers in the Democratic Republic of the Congo

The International Criminal Court investigation in the Democratic Republic of the Congo was initiated by Kabila in April 2004. The International Criminal Court prosecutor opened the case in June 2004. Child soldiers have been used on a large scale in DRC, and in 2011 it was estimated that 30,000 children were still operating with armed groups. Instances of child labor and forced labor have been observed and reported in the U.S. Department of Labor's "Findings on the Worst Forms of Child Labor" in the DRC in 2013 and six goods produced by the country's mining industry appear on the department's December 2014 "List of Goods Produced by Child Labor or Forced Labor".

The Democratic Republic of the Congo has prohibited same-sex marriage since 2006, and attitudes towards the LGBT community are generally negative throughout the nation. Violence against women is perceived by large sectors of society to be normal. The United Nations Committee on the Elimination of Discrimination against Women in 2006 expressed concern that in the post-war transition period, the promotion of women's human rights and gender equality is not seen as a priority.

Mass rapes, sexual violence and sexual slavery are used as a weapon of war by the Armed Forces of the Democratic Republic of the Congo and armed groups in the eastern part of the country. The eastern part of the country in particular has been described as the "rape capital of the world" and the prevalence of sexual violence there described as the worst in the world. The prevalence of Female genital mutilation is estimated at 5% of women and is illegal.

== Economy ==
Per capita GDP in the DRC, 1950–2018. Figures are inflation-adjusted to 2011 international dollars.

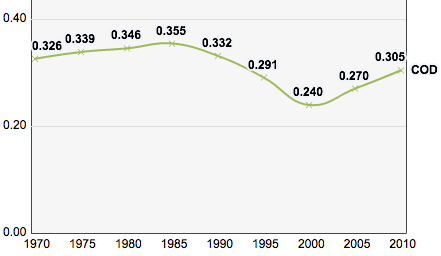
The DRC's Human Development Index score, 1970–2010

The economy of the DR Congo has grown from US$9.02 billion at the end of the Second Congo War in 2003 to US$72.48 billion in 2024 by nominal GDP, and from $29.23 billion to $190.13 billion by PPP-adjusted GDP during the same time period. Minerals and metal, specifically cobalt and copper, made up 80% of the country's exports in 2023. Its largest trade partner by a significant margin is China, which represented 41% of its exports in 2024, followed by Zambia, South Africa, Singapore, and the United Arab Emirates.

The DRC's economy, especially its mining sector, received significant foreign investment, and after the early 2000s it experienced high GDP growth rates that were above the average for sub-Saharan Africa. This led to improvements in infrastructure, but the growth has not alleviated poverty for the population, the majority of which (65%) is involved in subsistence agriculture. Most jobs are informal and there is also very high youth unemployment.

An estimated 73.5% of people in the DRC lived below the international poverty line of US$2.15 per day as of 2024, making it among the five poorest countries in the world. The DRC had the lowest Human Development Index of the 187 ranked countries in 2011. Agriculture is a large sector of the economy. Its output has declined over the past several decades with the DRC dependent upon food imports. In 2023, food-price inflation reached 173%.

At independence in 1960, the DRC was the second-most-industrialized country in Africa after South Africa; it boasted a thriving mining sector and a relatively productive agriculture sector. It is widely considered one of the world's richest countries in natural resources; its untapped deposits of raw minerals are estimated to be worth in excess of US$24 trillion. Despite such vast mineral wealth, the economy of the DRC has declined drastically since the mid-1980s. The country generated up to 70% of its export revenue from minerals in the 1970s and 1980s and was particularly hit when resource prices deteriorated at that time. Due to the fall in commodity prices, widespread corruption, and the collapse of the currency from hyperinflation, by the early 1990s the formal economy had nearly ceased to exist, with much of the population depending on subsistence agriculture or informal bartering.

The new government tried to implement a currency reform in 1997 after the First Congo War, but was disrupted by outbreak of the Second Congo War in 1998, which worsened all of the problems, along with infrastructure breakdown and the lack of a clear legal system. Economic stability improved in 2003 with assistance from international donors following the withdrawal of foreign troops, though continuing conflicts and the resulting humanitarian crisis still undermine economic development.

In the 2020s, the DRC has taken measures to move away from its traditional state-dominated economic model, with state monopolies and elite control in key sectors, towards a market economy, with partial privatization in the mining and telecommunications sectors. It also prioritized economic liberalization and integration, having trade agreements with over 50 countries, and has taken steps to develop e-commerce. The DRC joined the African Continental Free Trade Area in 2022, and aligned itself with EAC and SADC legal standards with regard to anti-competitive practices in 2023. These efforts have been stalled by government corruption, patronage networks, limited enforcement, and trade policies inconsistent with regional frameworks.

=== Mining ===
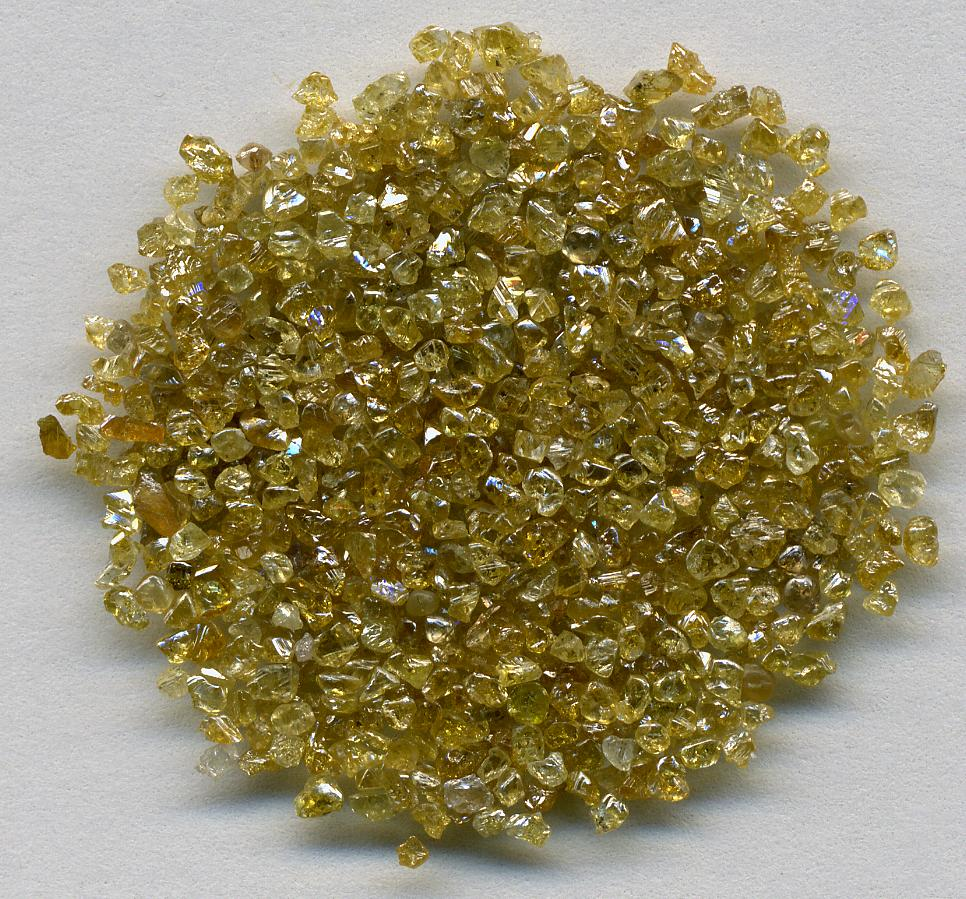
Rough diamonds ≈1 to 1.5 mm in size from the DR Congo

The mining sector has been responsible for much of the DRC's economic growth since the Second Congo War. The DRC is the world's largest producer of cobalt ore, accounting for 70% of global production in 2023, and a major producer of copper and diamonds. It has 70% of the world's coltan, a third of its cobalt, more than 30% of its diamond reserves, and a tenth of its copper. In February 2018, global asset management firm AllianceBernstein defined the DRC as economically "the Saudi Arabia of the electric vehicle age", because of its cobalt resources, cobalt being essential in the production of the lithium-ion batteries that power many electric vehicles.

Diamonds come from Kasaï Province in the central DRC. By far the largest mines are located in southern Katanga Province and are highly mechanized, with a capacity of several million tons per year of copper and cobalt ore, and refining capability for metal ore. The DRC is the second-largest diamond-producing nation in the world. (Note: In terms of annual carats produced) Artisanal and small-scale miners account for most of its production.

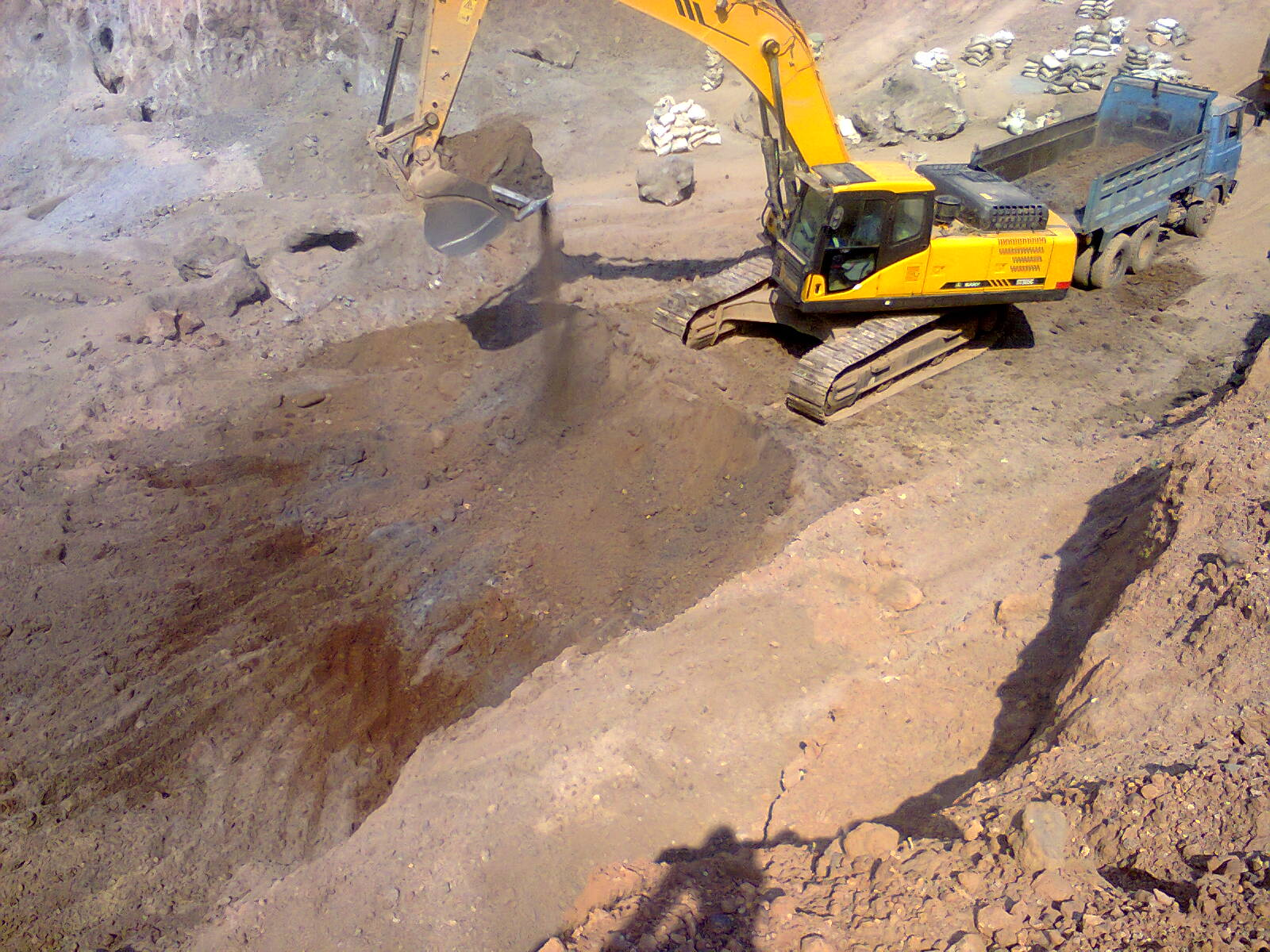
A mining site in the Haut-Katanga Province

Smaller-scale economic activity from artisanal mining occurs in the informal sector and is not reflected in GDP data. A third of the DRC's diamonds are believed to be smuggled out of the country, making it difficult to quantify diamond production levels. In 2002, tin was discovered in the east of the country but to date has only been mined on a small scale. Smuggling of conflict minerals such as coltan and cassiterite, ores of tantalum and tin, respectively, helped to fuel the war in the eastern Congo. Open-pit cobalt mining has led to deforestation and habitat destruction.

Katanga Mining Limited, a Swiss-owned company, owns the Luilu Metallurgical Plant, which has a capacity of 175,000 tonnes of copper and 8,000 tonnes of cobalt per year, making it the largest cobalt refinery in the world. After a major rehabilitation program, the company resumed copper production operations in December 2007 and cobalt production in May 2008.

In 2007–08, Joseph Kabila's administration entered a 'resources-for-infrastructure' deal with China, creating the joint venture Sicomines (Sino-Congolais des Mines), with the majority of the shares owned by the China Railway Engineering Corporation (CREC) while the DRC's Gécamines owned the rest. The company received mining rights in exchange for investing US$3 billion into building infrastructure. Sicomines began production in 2015. The deal has received criticism for terms that appeared to be disproportionately favorable to China at the expense of the DRC. Félix Tshisekedi's administration ordered an investigation into the deal, which concluded that less than US$1 billion had been spent on infrastructure. Tshisekedi renegotiated the agreement to add new terms, and in 2024 this led to the infrastructure investment being increased to US$7 billion.

In April 2013, anti-corruption NGOs revealed that Congolese tax authorities had failed to account for $88 million from the mining sector, despite booming production and positive industrial performance. The missing funds date from 2010 and tax bodies should have paid them into the central bank. Later in 2013, the Extractive Industries Transparency Initiative suspended the country's candidacy for membership due to insufficient reporting, monitoring and independent audits, but in July 2013 the country improved its accounting and transparency practices to the point where the EITI gave the country full membership.

=== Transportation ===
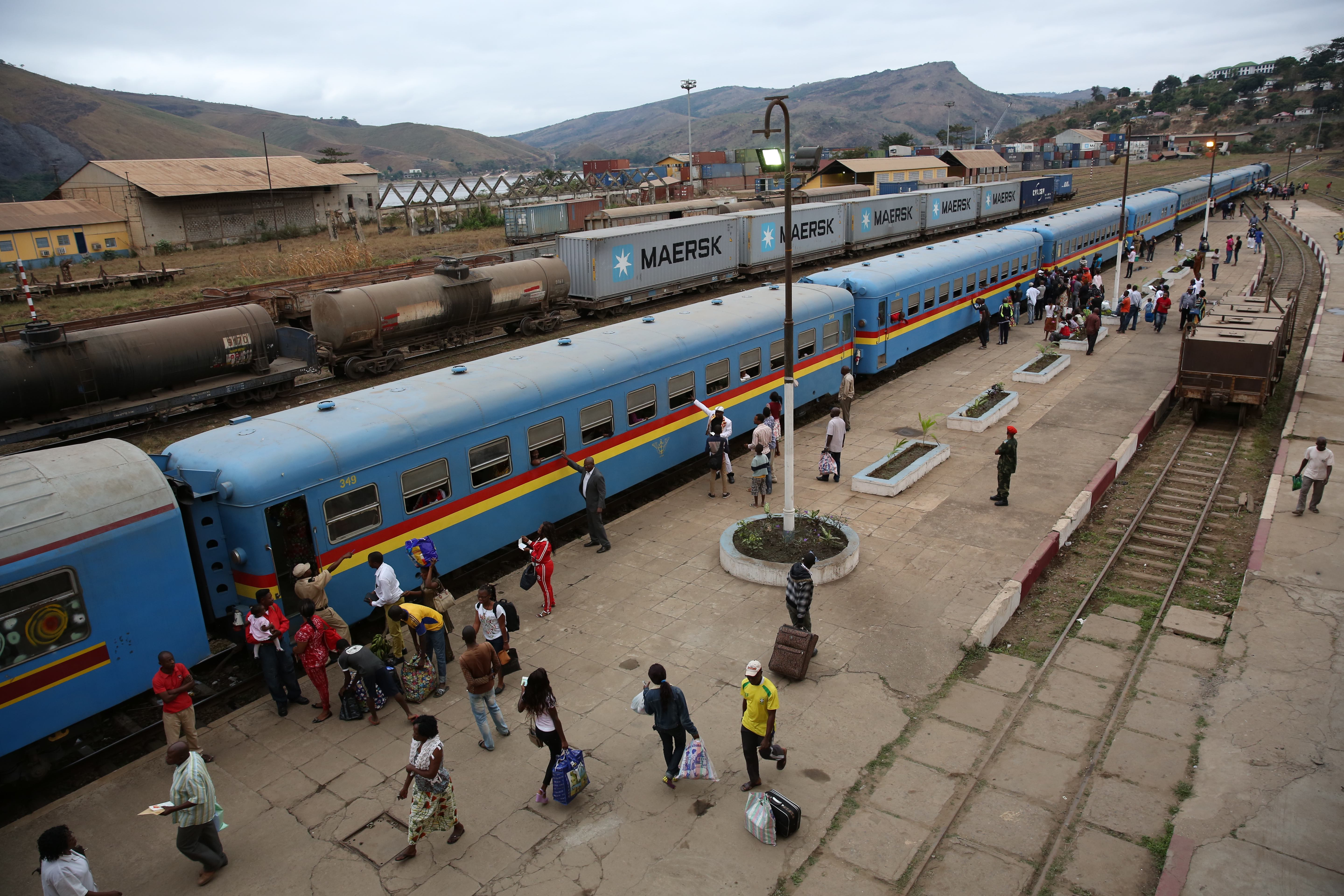
The Matadi railway station, part of the Matadi–Kinshasa Railway

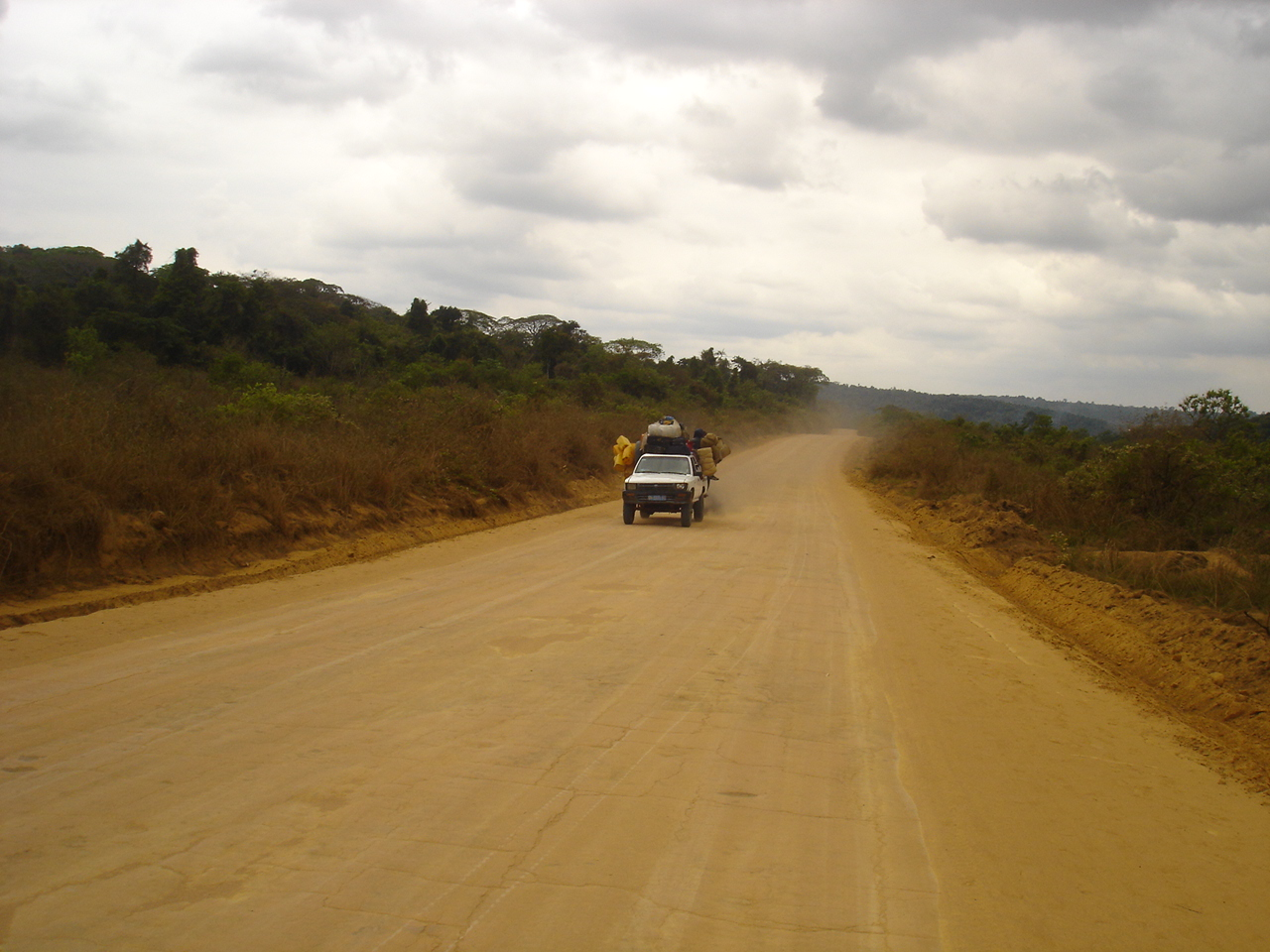
A section of National Road 1 between Boma and Moanda, Kongo Central

The DRC has 152,373 kilometres (94,680 mi) of roads, out of which only 3,047 kilometres (1,893 mi) are paved. It also has 4,007 kilometres (2,490 mi) of railways, with most being narrow-gauge. The infrastructure is in a state of disrepair, and the national highway system is very limited; reaching the capital by road is not possible from many parts of the country. Since the early 2000s there have been improvements to the road network, but the dense forests and numerous rivers in the DRC make construction and maintenance difficult. Air and river transportation have an important role due to the terrain and the poor state of the road and rail networks.

Air travel has seen an increase since the early 2000s, with 24 city pairs having airline service as of 2007, although it has a poor safety record. All air carriers certified by the DRC have been banned from European Union airports because of inadequate safety standards. Despite this, airlines are seen as the most reliable form of domestic travel. There are eight airlines in the country, including the flag carrier Congo Airways, and several international airlines service Kinshasa's international airport. Besides Kinshasa there are three other international airports in the DRC, which are at Lubumbashi, Kisangani, and Goma.

The DRC has about 15,000 kilometres (9,300 mi) of navigable waterways, with the Congo River serving as the spine. Water transport has traditionally been the dominant means of moving around in the DRC and is also used to fill gaps between roads. Around two million tons of cargo pass through the port of Kinshasa on the Congo River every year, more than triple the volume moved by the national railroad company, the SNCC. River transports are owned by many private operators. The DRC's three economic hubs—Kinshasa in the west, Lubumbashi in the south, and Kinsangani in the northeast—are not connected by roads or rail.

The rail system is concentrated in the southeast. Kinshasa is connected by river ferry to Ilebo, where the rail line to Lubumbashi begins. This line is also critical for the movement of metal and minerals from the southern DRC to ports in Angola or South Africa (via Zambia) to be exported overseas. There is an electrified line between Kinshasa and the Atlantic seaport of Matadi. The track and rolling stock of the SNCC system is in poor condition, though the more recently built Matadi–Kinshasa line has better track.

There are 44 national roads with a total of 58,358 kilometres (36,262 mi). Three of them are considered the most important. National Road No. 1 (RN1) is the main highway of the road system, connecting seaports in Kongo Central with Kinshasa and cities in the interior, such as Lubumbashi. RN1 reaches the border with Zambia in the south. National Road 2 (RN2) connects the central city of Mbuji-Mayi with Goma in the east, with most of it outside of the Kivu region being in a bad condition, and National Road 3 (RN3) connects Goma to Kisangani, from where a river boat can be taken to Kinshasa.

=== Energy ===
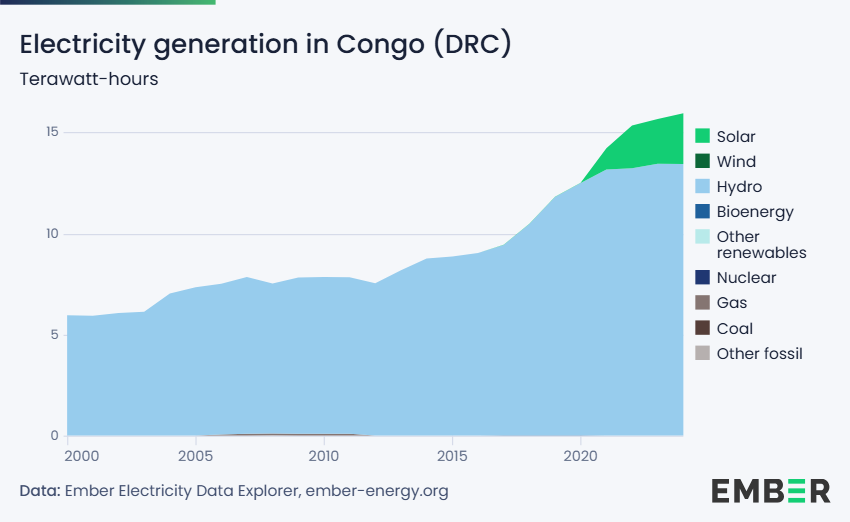
Electricity generation in Congo (DRC) in terawatt-hours, 2026

The generation and distribution of electricity is controlled by Société Nationale d'Électricité (SNEL), but only 15% of the country has access to electricity. The DRC has the infrastructure for hydro-electricity from the Congo River at the Inga dams. Both coal and crude oil resources were mainly used domestically up to 2008.

In 2010, the DRC had 2,400 megawatts of installed capacity, with only 1,000 MW functioning. The only interconnected part of the power grid is the high voltage transmission line between the Inga dams in Kongo Central and the southern DRC. This line runs to the Zambian border and is also used to export electricity to Zambia, Zimbabwe, and South Africa. Almost half of companies in the DRC have their own generators due to blackouts and the limitations of the power grid.

The DRC has a river system that could provide hydro-electric power to the entire continent, according to a UN report on the country's strategic significance and its potential role as an economic power in central Africa. The DRC's electricity generation potential from hydro-power is estimated at 100,000 MW. The DRC is a member of three electrical power pools. These are Southern African Power Pool, East African Power Pool, and Central African Power Pool.

Because of abundant sunlight, the potential for solar power is very high in the DRC. There are already about 836 solar power systems in the DRC, with a total power of 83 MW, located in Équateur (167), Katanga (159), Nord-Kivu (170), the two Kasaï provinces (170), and Bas-Congo (170). Also, the 148 Caritas network system has a total power of 6.31 MW.

== Demographics ==
The Democratic Republic of the Congo's population between 1960 and 2017

The DRC has a high annual population growth rate, and the population increased from 51.9 million in 2000 to 105 million in 2021. Between 1950 and 2000, the country's population nearly quadrupled from 12.2 million to 46.9 million.

In 2026, 52% of the population had access to water services (29% in rural areas). 31% have access to sanitation services (21% in rural areas). The DRC also lacks state-sponsored social safety nets, with 12% of formal workers, mostly government employees, being enrolled in the National Social Security Fund.

=== Ethnic groups ===
Over 250 ethnic groups and 450 tribes (ethnic subgroups) populate the DRC. They are in the Bantu, Sudanic, Nilotic, Ubangian and Pygmy linguistic groups. Because of this diversity, there is no dominant ethnic group in the Congo, however the following ethnic groups account for 51.5% of the population:

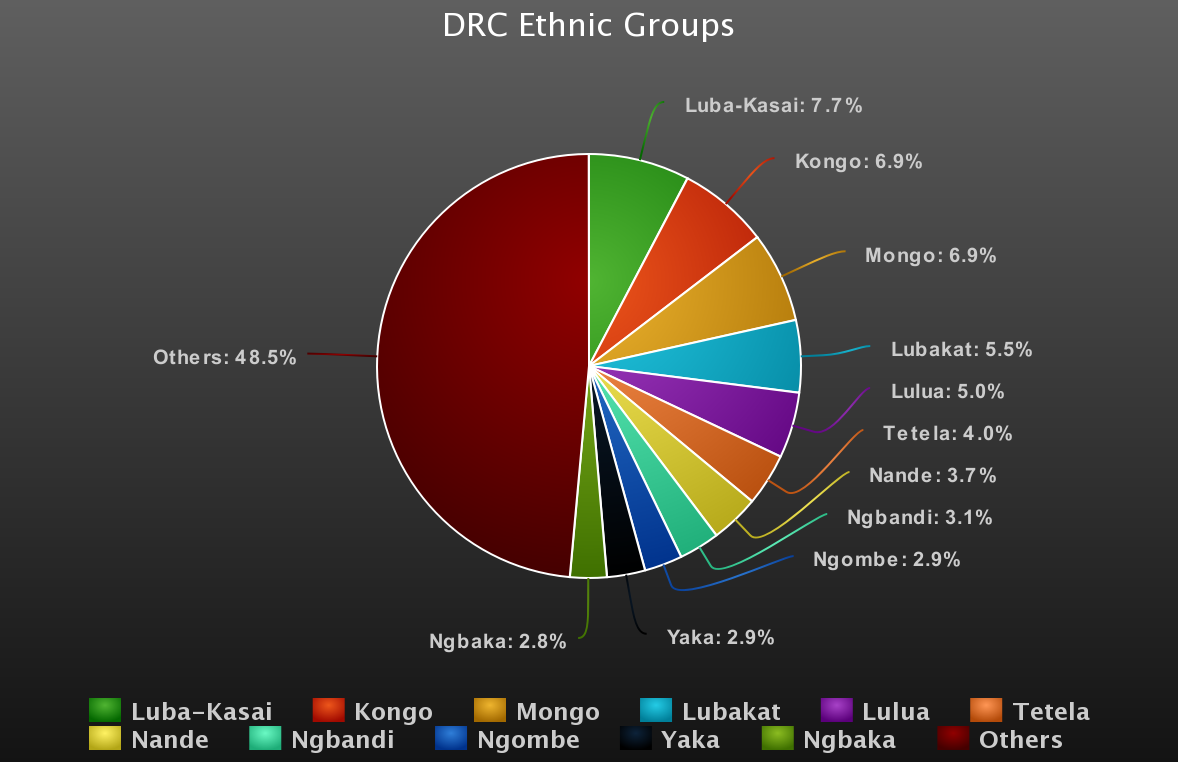
The largest ethnic groups in the DRC

- Luba-Kasaï
- Kongo
- Mongo
- Lubakat
- Lulua
- Tetela
- Nande
- Ngbandi
- Ngombe
- Yaka
- Ngbaka

In 2021, the UN estimated the country's population to be 96 million, a rapid increase from 39.1 million in 1992 despite the ongoing war. As many as 250 ethnic groups have been identified and named. About 600,000 Pygmies live in the DRC.

=== Largest cities ===
Largest cities or towns in the Democratic Republic of the Congo
Rank	Name	Province	Pop.
1	Kinshasa	Kinshasa	15,628,000
2	Mbuji-Mayi	Kasai-Oriental	2,765,000
3	Lubumbashi	Haut-Katanga	2,695,000
4	Kisangani	Tshopo	1,640,000
5	Kananga	Kasaï-Central	1,593,000
6	Mbandaka	Équateur	1,188,000
7	Bukavu	South Kivu	1,190,000
8	Tshikapa	Kasaï	1,024,000
9	Bunia	Ituri	768,000
10	Goma	North Kivu	707,000

=== Migration ===
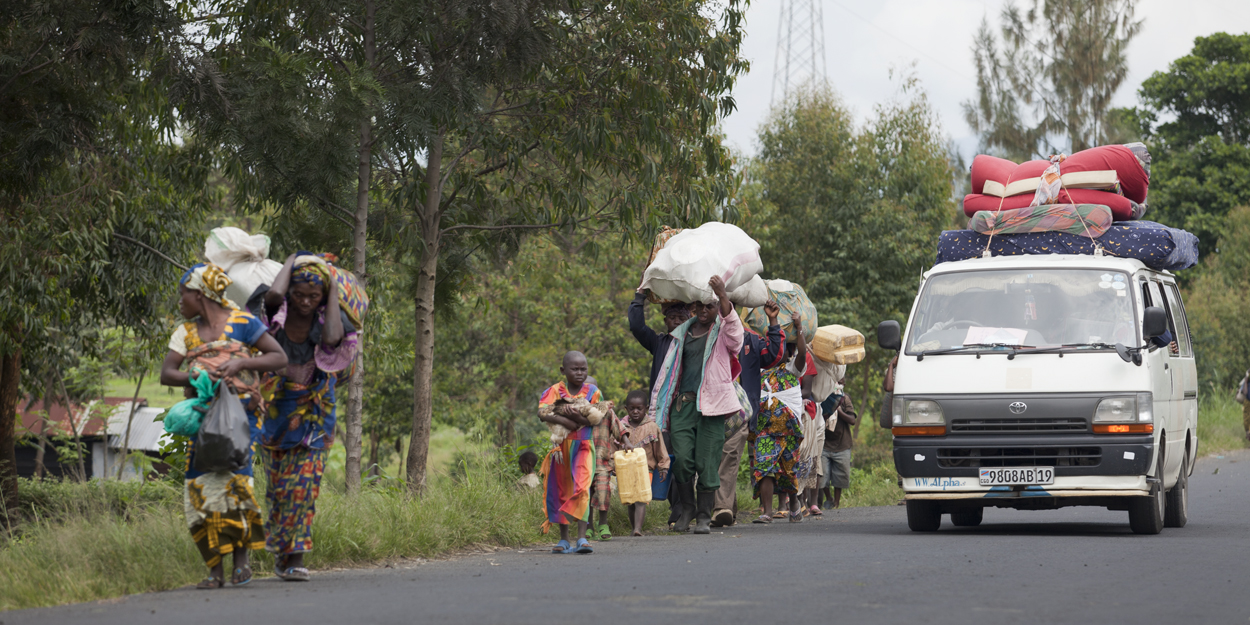
People fleeing their villages due to fighting between FARDC and rebels groups, Sake, North Kivu, April 2012

Given the often unstable situation in the country and the condition of state structures, it is extremely difficult to obtain reliable migration data. However, evidence suggests that DRC continues to be a destination country for immigrants, in spite of recent declines in their numbers. Immigration is very diverse in nature; refugees and asylum-seekers – products of the numerous and violent conflicts in the Great Lakes Region – constitute an important subset of the population. The country's large mine operations attract migrant workers from Africa and beyond. There is also considerable migration for commercial activities from other African countries and the rest of the world, but these movements are not well studied. Transit migration towards South Africa and Europe also plays a role.

Immigration to the DRC has decreased steadily over the past two decades, most likely as a result of the armed violence that the country has experienced. The number of immigrants in the DRC has fallen from just over one million in 1960, to 754,000 in 1990, to 480,000 in 2005, to an estimated 445,000 in 2010. Official figures are unavailable, partly due to the predominance of the informal economy in the DRC. Data is lacking on irregular immigrants, however given neighbouring countries' ethnic links to DRC nationals, irregular migration is assumed to be a significant phenomenon.

Figures for Congolese nationals abroad vary greatly depending on the source; sources believe there are between three and six million Congolese living abroad. This discrepancy is due to a lack of official, reliable data. Emigrants from the DRC are above all long-term emigrants, the majority of whom live in Africa and to a lesser extent in Europe; 79.7% and 15.3% respectively, in 2000.

New destination countries include South Africa and various points en route to Europe. The DRC has produced a considerable number of refugees and asylum-seekers located in the region and beyond. These numbers peaked in 2004 when there were more than 460,000 refugees from the DRC; in 2008, Congolese refugees numbered 367,995 in total, 68% of whom were living in other African countries.

Since 2003, more than 400,000 Congolese migrants have been expelled from Angola.

Europeans and Asians makeup a significant part of the Democratic Republic of the Congo's migrant population. Most Europeans and Asians went to the country for temporary employment.

==== Forced displacement and refugees ====
The DRC has around 6.9 million people displaced within its borders, more than five million of whom are in the eastern provinces of North Kivu, South Kivu and Ituri. In addition, over 990,000 Congolese refugees and asylum seekers live elsewhere on the African continent. The internal displacement crisis in the DRC is the most severe in Africa.

=== Languages ===
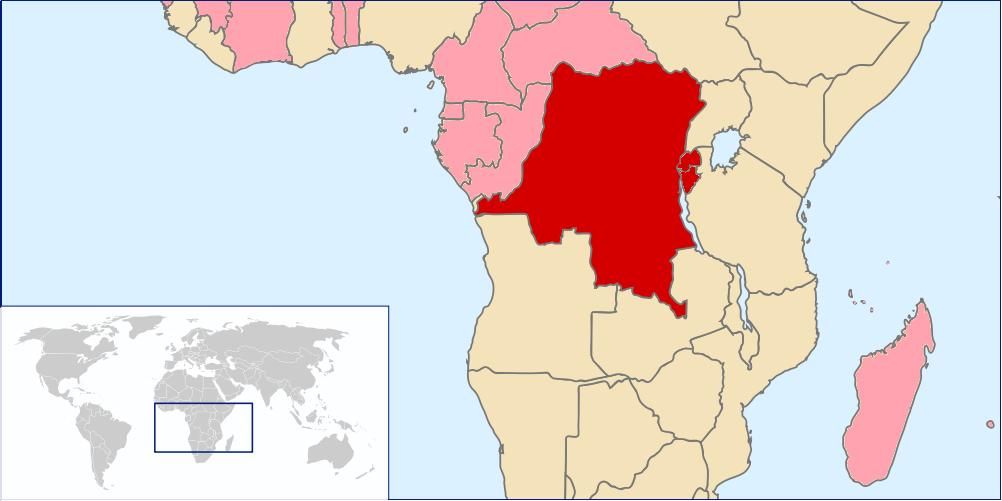
The Democratic Republic of the Congo speaks a variant of Belgian French (dark red), compared to other French speaking parts of Africa.

French is the official language of the Democratic Republic of the Congo. It is culturally accepted as the lingua franca, facilitating communication among the many different ethnic groups of the Congo. In 2018, 49 million Congolese people (51% of the population) could read and write French. A 2021 survey found that 74% of the population could speak French, making it the most widely spoken language in the country.

In Kinshasa, 67% of the population in 2014 could read and write French, and 68.5% could speak and understand it.

In 2024, there were around 12 million native French speakers in the country.

The four Bantu languages with elevated "national" status

Approximately 242 languages are spoken in the DRC, of which four have the status of national languages: Kituba (Kikongo), Lingala, Tshiluba, and Swahili (Congo Swahili). Although some limited number of people speak these as first languages, most of the population speak them as a second language, after the native language of their own ethnic group. Lingala was the official language of the Force Publique under Belgian colonial rule and remains to this day the predominant language of the armed forces. Since the recent rebellions, a good part of the army in the east also uses Swahili, where it competes to be the regional lingua franca.

Under Belgian rule, the Belgians instituted the teaching and use of the four Bantu languages in primary schools, making it one of the few African nations to have literacy in local languages during the European colonial period. This trend was reversed after independence, when French became the sole language of education at all levels. Since 1975, the four national languages have been reintroduced in the first two years of primary education, with French becoming the sole language of education from the third year onward, but in practice many primary schools in urban areas solely use French from the first year of school onward.

Portuguese is taught in public schools as a foreign language due to the Angolan, and to a lesser extent Mozambican immigrant and refugee communities. Brazil has also been promoting the language in Africa. The lexical similarity and comparable phonology of French to Portuguese makes it a relatively easy language for people to learn. Many of the roughly 175,000 Portuguese speakers in the DRC are Angolans who fled violence during the Angolan War of Independence and Angolan Civil War of the late 20th century. Most of them have been repatriated back since the war ended in 2002.

=== Religion ===
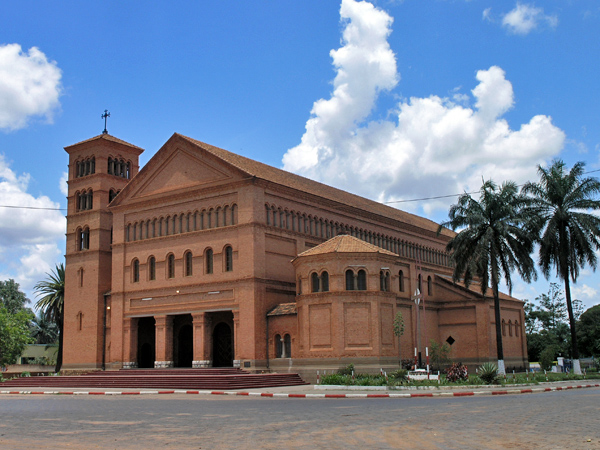
The Sts. Peter and Paul Cathedral, Lubumbashi

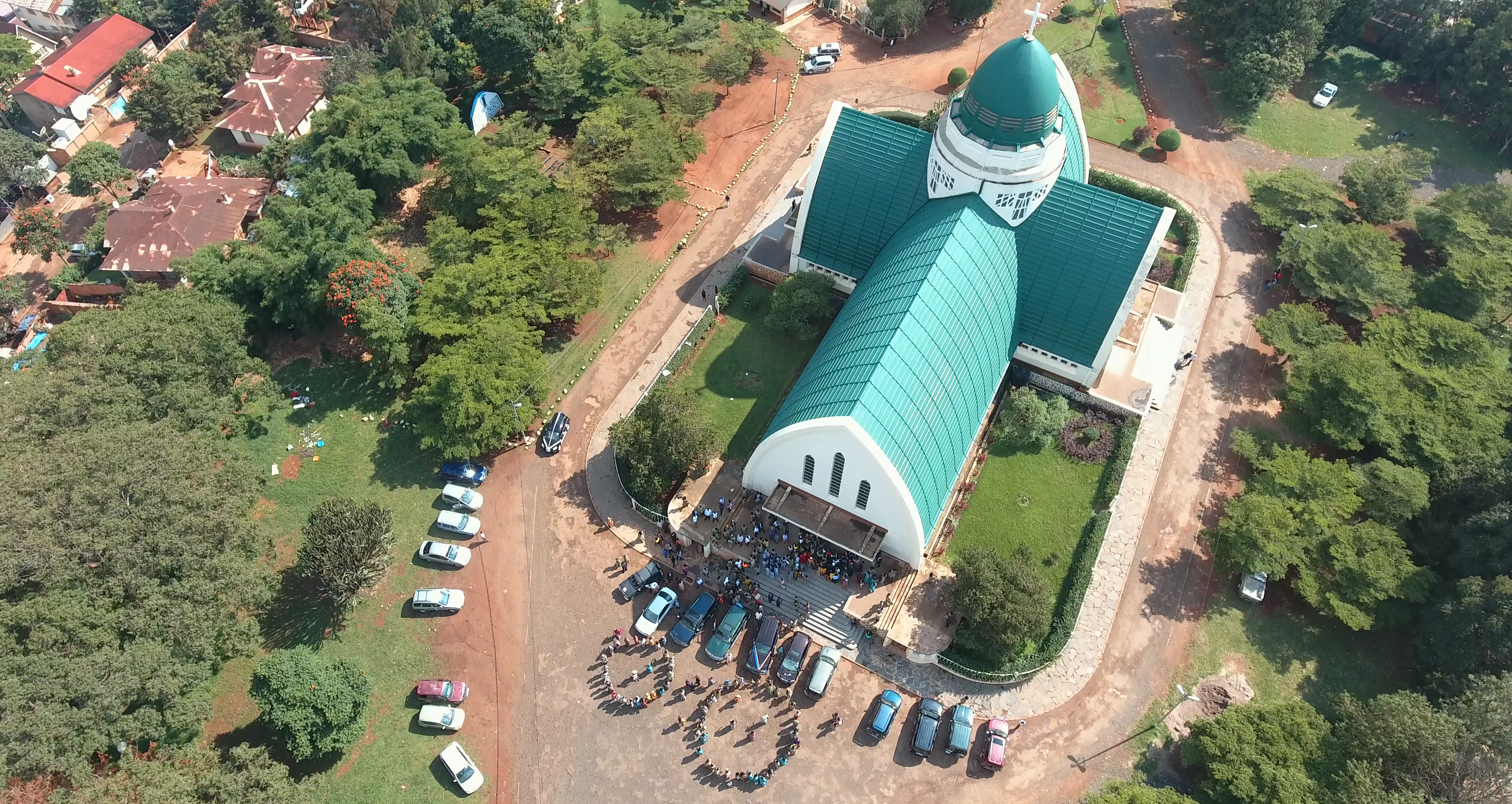
Our Lady of Peace Cathedral in Bukavu

Christianity is the predominant religion of the DRC. In 2013, Christians constituted 93.7% of the population, with Catholics making up 29.7%, Protestants 26.8%, and other Christians 37.2%. A new Christian religious movement, Kimbanguism, had the adherence of 2.8%, while Muslims made up 1%. Other recent estimates have found Christianity the majority religion, followed by 95.8% of the population according to a 2010 Pew Research Center estimate. The CIA World Factbook reports this figure to be 95.9%. The proportion of followers of Islam is estimated from 1% to 12%.

In 2014, there were about 35 million Catholics in the country with six archdioceses and 41 dioceses. The impact of the Catholic Church is difficult to overestimate. Schatzberg has called it the country's "only truly national institution apart from the state". Its schools have educated over 60% of the nation's primary school students and more than 40% of its secondary students. The church owns and manages an extensive network of hospitals, schools, and clinics, as well as many diocesan economic enterprises, including farms, ranches, stores, and artisans' shops.

Sixty-two Protestant denominations are federated under the umbrella of the Church of Christ in the Congo. It is often referred to as the Protestant Church, since it covers most of the DRC Protestants. With more than 25 million members, it constitutes one of the largest Protestant bodies in the world.

Kimbanguism was seen as a threat to the colonial regime and was banned by the Belgians. Kimbanguism, officially "the church of Christ on Earth by the prophet Simon Kimbangu", has about three million members, primarily among the Bakongo of Kongo Central and Kinshasa.

Islam has been present in the Democratic Republic of the Congo since the 18th century, brought by Arab traders. Today, Muslims constitute approximately 1% of the Congolese population according to the Pew Research Center. The majority are Sunni Muslims.

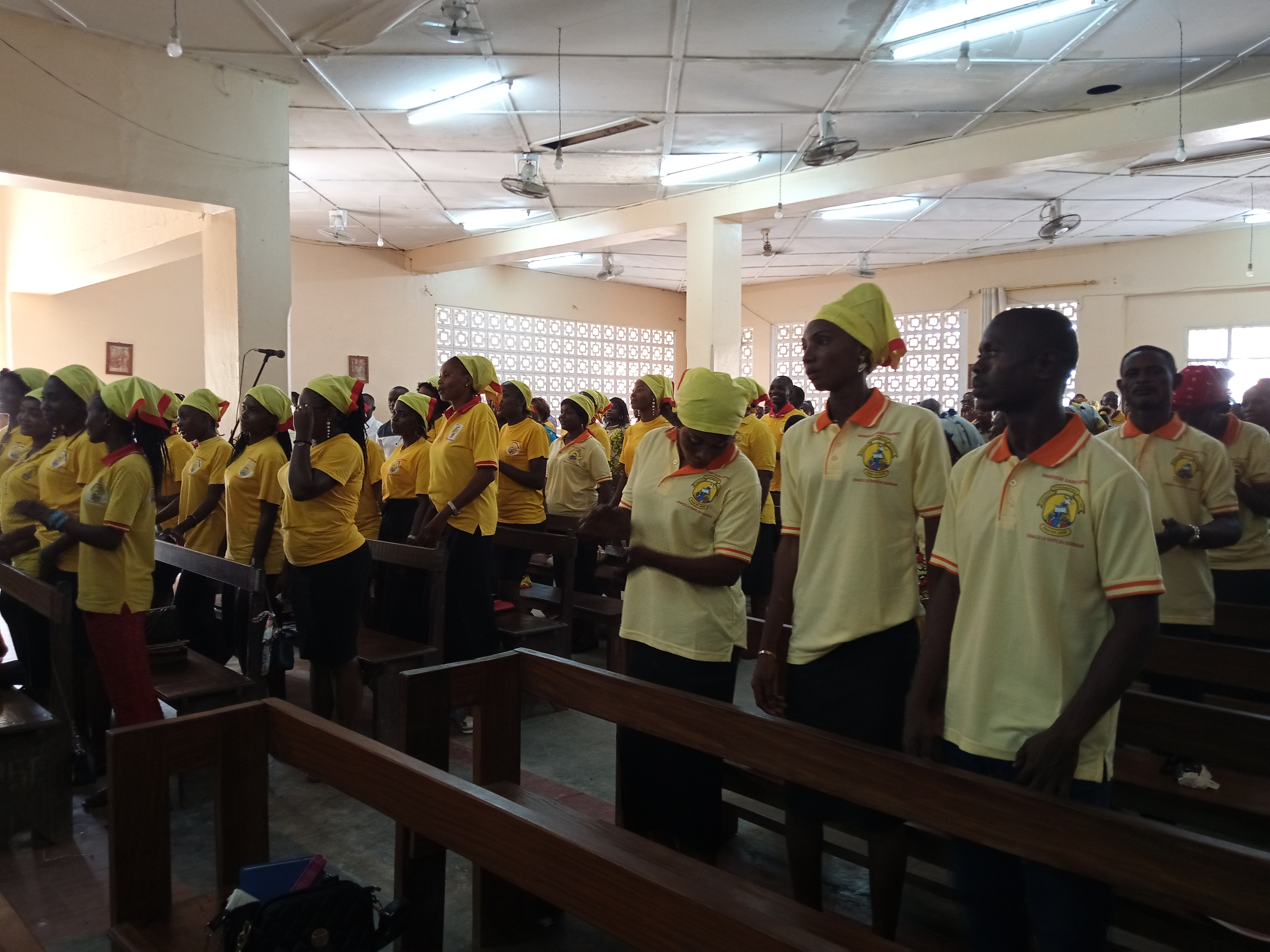
A Roman Catholic Church in the Democratic Republic of the Congo

The first members of the Baháʼí Faith to live in the country came from Uganda in 1953. Four years later, the first local administrative council was elected. In 1970, the National Spiritual Assembly (national administrative council) was first elected. Though the religion was banned in the 1970s and 1980s, due to misrepresentations of foreign governments, the ban was lifted by the end of the 1980s. In 2012, plans were announced to build a national Baháʼí House of Worship in the country.

Traditional religions embody such concepts as monotheism, animism, vitalism, spirit and ancestor worship, witchcraft, and sorcery and vary widely among ethnic groups. The syncretic sects often merge elements of Christianity with traditional beliefs and rituals and are not recognized by mainstream churches as part of Christianity. New variants of ancient beliefs have become widespread, led by US-inspired Pentecostal churches which have been in the forefront of witchcraft accusations, particularly against children and the elderly.

Children accused of witchcraft are sent away from homes and family, often to live on the street, which can lead to physical violence against these children. There are charities supporting street children such as the Congo Children Trust. The Congo Children Trust's flagship project is Kimbilio, which works to reunite street children in Lubumbashi.

The usual term for these children is enfants sorciers (child witches) or enfants dits sorciers (children accused of witchcraft). Non-denominational church organizations have been formed to capitalize on this belief by charging exorbitant fees for exorcisms. Though recently outlawed, children have been subjected in these exorcisms to often-violent abuse at the hands of self-proclaimed prophets and priests.

=== Education ===
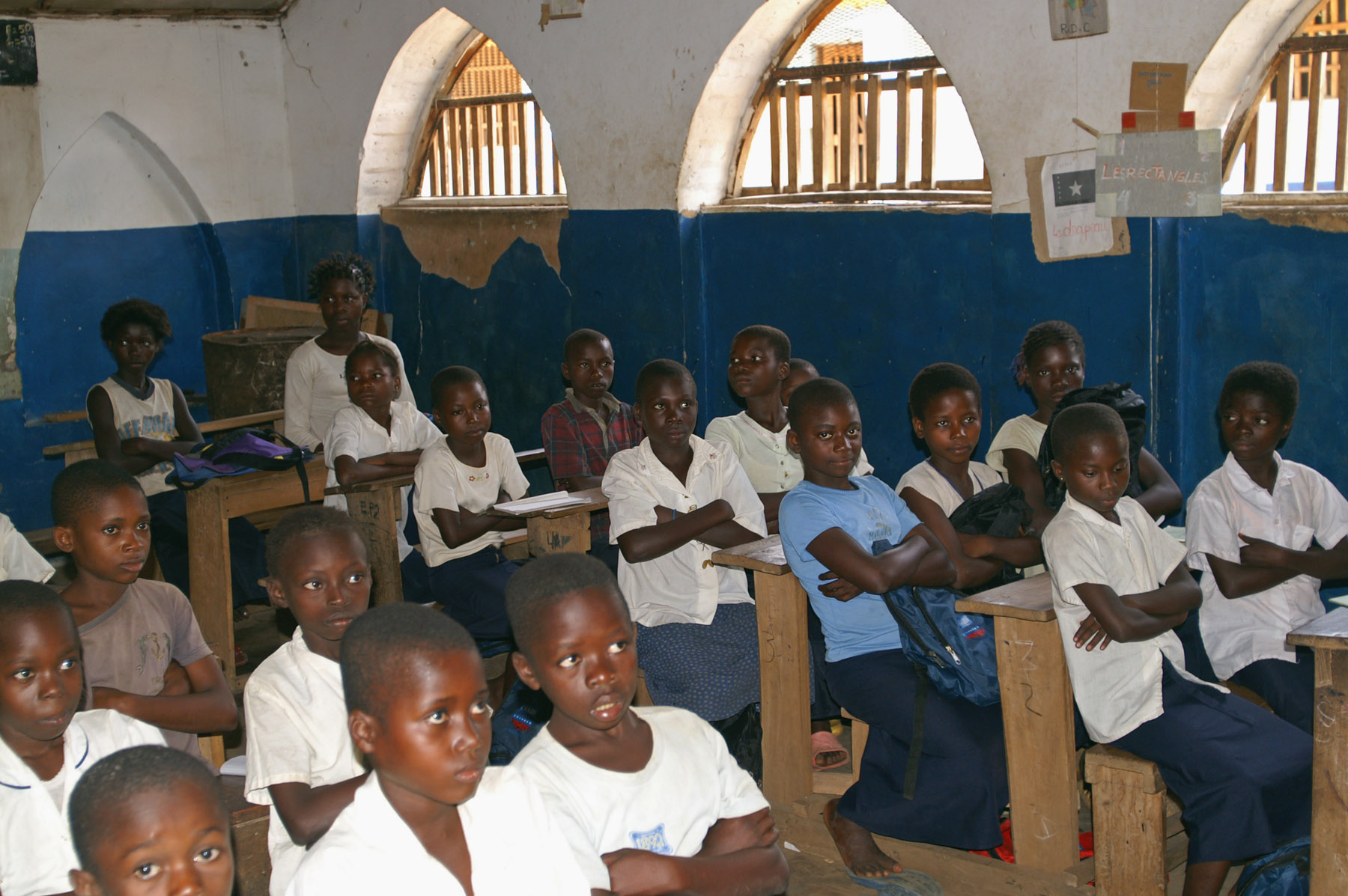
A classroom in the Democratic Republic of the Congo

In 2014, the literacy rate for the population between the ages of 15 and 49 was estimated to be 75.9% (88.1% male and 63.8% female). The education system is governed by three government ministries: the Ministère de l'Enseignement Primaire, Secondaire et Professionnel (MEPSP), the Ministère de l'Enseignement Supérieur et Universitaire (MESU) and the Ministère des Affaires Sociales (MAS). Primary education is neither free nor compulsory, even though the Congolese constitution says it should be (Article 43 of the 2005 Congolese Constitution).

As a result of the First and Second Congo Wars in the late 1990s—early 2000s, over 5.2 million children in the country did not receive any education. Since the end of the civil war, the situation has improved tremendously, with the number of children enrolled in primary schools rising from 5.5 million in 2002 to 16.8 million in 2018, and the number of children enrolled in secondary schools rising from 2.8 million in 2007 to 4.6 million in 2015.

Actual school attendance has also improved greatly in recent years, with primary school net attendance estimated to be 82.4% in 2014 (82.4% of children ages 6–11 attended school; 83.4% for boys, 80.6% for girls).

=== Health ===
Changes in life expectancy in the Democratic Republic of the Congo, 1950 to 2021

The DRC faces persistent healthcare challenges, including outbreaks of Ebola, measles, and malaria, and its healthcare system is under-resourced. Inadequate infrastructure limits emergency response capability. The result is difficulty in providing transportation for medical treatment and supplies. Financial inequalities prevent access to services. Medical supplies and equipment have also been looted from healthcare facilities. In of 2024, the DRC spent 3.1% of its GDP on healthcare, and 75% of Congolese rely on out-of-pocket payments for medical treatment. Hospitals in the Democratic Republic of the Congo include the General Hospital of Kinshasa.

The DRC has the world's second-highest rate of infant mortality (after Chad). In April 2011, through aid from Global Alliance for Vaccines, a new vaccine to prevent pneumococcal disease was introduced around Kinshasa. In 2012, it was estimated that about 1.1% of adults aged 15–49 were living with HIV/AIDS. Malaria and yellow fever are problems.

In early 2025, there was a 50% drop in children under the age of five years old visiting medical facilities, compared to a year earlier. The number of vaccinated children dropped from 67,000 to 29,000 when comparing the first quarter of 2023 to that of 2025.

In May 2026, the World Health Organization declared the Ebola outbreak caused by the Bundibugyo virus in the Democratic Republic of the Congo a public health emergency of international concern (PHEIC).

The incidence of yellow fever-related fatalities in DRC is relatively low. In 2021, only two individuals died due to yellow fever in DRC.

In 2016, 26,529 people died on the roads in DRC due to traffic accidents.

Maternal health is poor in DRC. In 2010, the DRC had the 17th highest maternal mortality rate in the world. In 2015, 43.5% of children under five were stunted.

In 2020, the United Nations emergency food relief agency warned that amid the escalating conflict and worsening situation following COVID-19 in the DRC, millions of lives were at risk as they could die of hunger. In 2020, four in ten people in Congo lacked food security and about 15.6 million were facing a potential hunger crisis.

Air pollution levels in the Democratic Republic of the Congo are very unhealthy. In 2020, annual average air pollution in the DRC stood at 34.2 μg/m^{3}, which is almost 6.8 times the World Health Organization PM2.5 guideline (5 μg/m^{3}: set in September 2021). These pollution levels are estimated to reduce the life expectancy of an average citizen of the DRC by almost 2.9 years. Currently, the DRC does not have a national ambient air quality standard.

== Culture ==
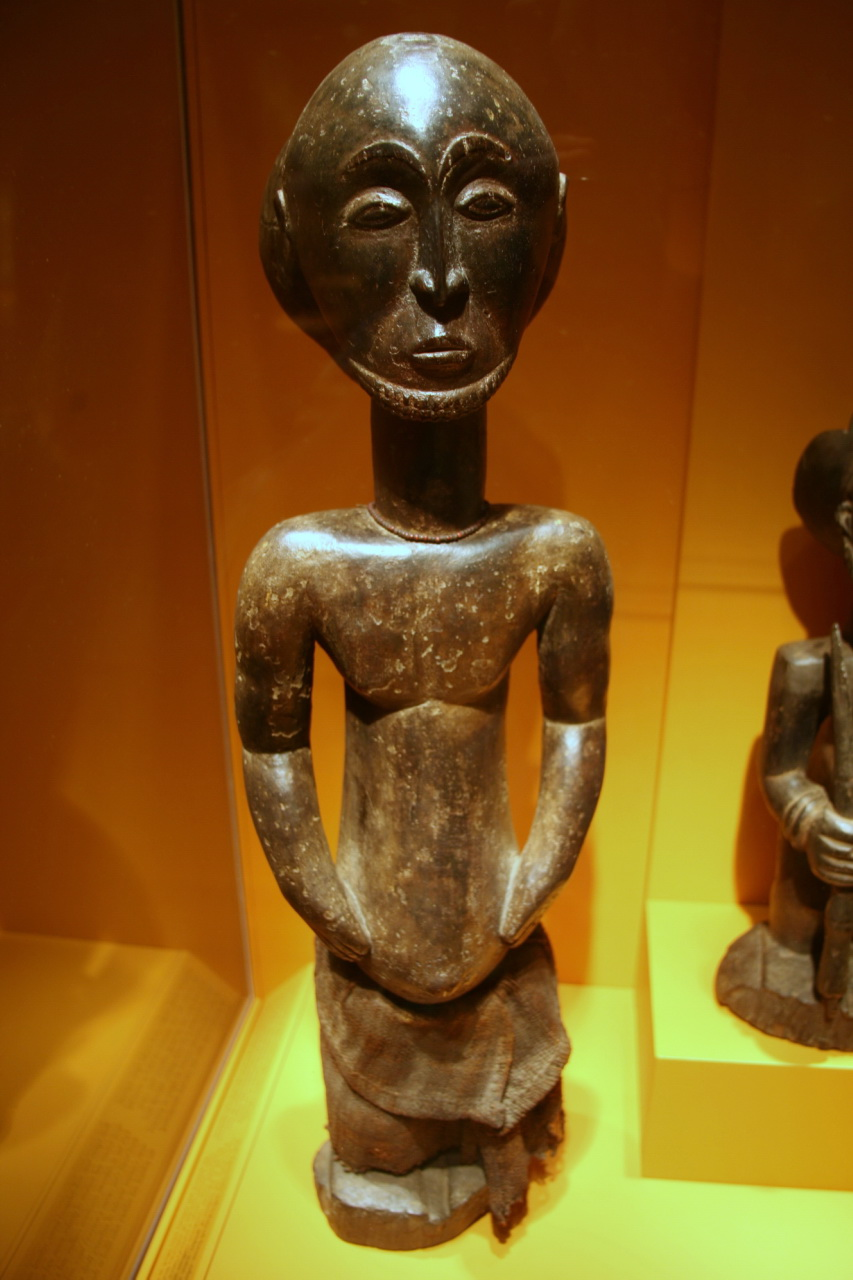
A Hemba male statue

The culture of the Democratic Republic of the Congo reflects the diversity of its numerous ethnic groups and their differing ways of life throughout the country—from the mouth of the River Congo on the coast, upriver through the rainforest and savanna in its centre, to the more densely populated mountains in the far east. Since the late 19th century, traditional ways of life have undergone changes brought about by colonialism, the struggle for independence, the stagnation of the Mobutu era, and most recently, the First and Second Congo Wars. Despite these pressures, the customs and cultures of the Congo have retained much of their individuality. The country's 81 million inhabitants (2016) are mainly rural. The 30% who live in urban areas have been the most open to Western influences.

=== Literature ===
French-language Congolese literature developed particularly from the end of World War II, during the period of the Belgian Congo. Early figures included Antoine-Roger Bolamba and Paul Lomami-Tshibamba.

After independence, Congolese literature diversified, with V. Y. Mudimbe becoming a prominent writer and scholar of the postcolonial period. Contemporary Congolese literature includes writers such as In Koli Jean Bofane, Fiston Mwanza Mujila, Sinzo Aanza and Blaise Ndala.

=== Music ===
Congo has a rich musical heritage, rooted in traditional rhythms. The earliest known form of popular partnered dance music in Congo was Maringa, denoting a Kongolese dance practised within the former Kingdom of Loango, encompassing parts of the present-day Republic of the Congo, southern Gabon and Cabinda. The style gained popularity in the 1920s–1930s, introducing the "bar-dancing" culture in Léopoldville (now Kinshasa), incorporating unique elements like a bass drum, a bottle as a triangle, and an accordion.

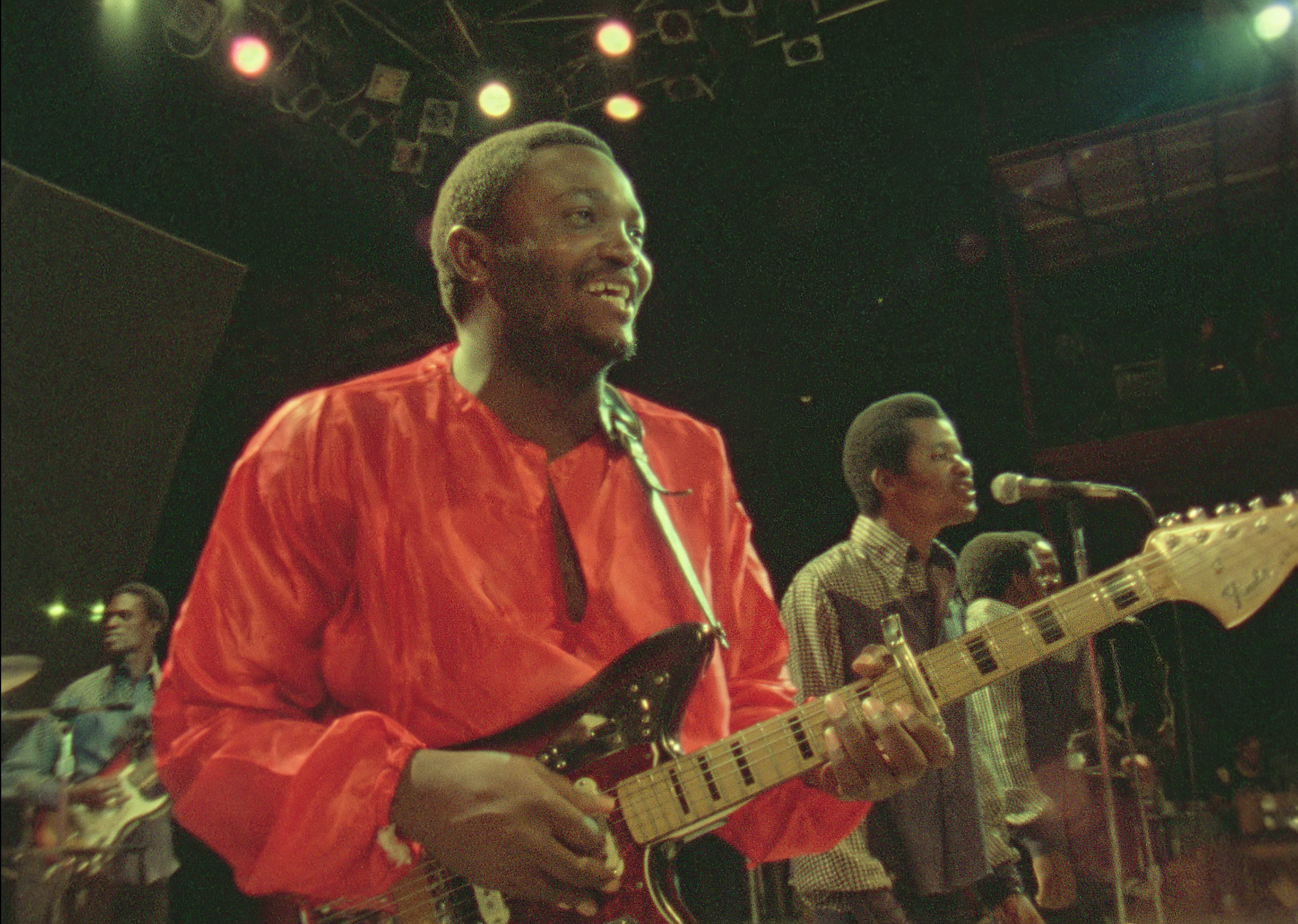
Franco Luambo and his OK Jazz orchestra performing live at Zaire 74

In the 1940s and 1950s, the influence of Cuban son bands transformed Maringa into "Congolese rumba". Imported records by Sexteto Habanero and Trio Matamoros, often mislabeled as "rumba", played a significant role. Artists such as Antoine Kasongo, Paul Kamba, Henri Bowane, Antoine Wendo Kolosoy, Franco Luambo, Le Grand Kallé, Vicky Longomba, Nico Kasanda, Tabu Ley Rochereau, and Papa Noël Nedule authentically popularized the style and made significant contributions to it in the 1940s and 1950s.

The 1960s and 1970s saw the emergence of Zaïko Langa Langa, one of the most innovative groups of the genre, which has crossed generations and is considered part of Congolese heritage and pop culture, as well as soukous, an urban dance music style that evolved from Congolese rumba. Soukous led to diverse offshoots, such as ekonda saccadé, reflecting the Mongo rhythmic influence, and mokonyonyon, emulating pelvic thrust dance movements from the Otetela ethnic background. The same soukous, under the guidance of "le sapeur", Papa Wemba, have set the tone for a generation of young men always dressed up in exorbitant designer clothes. They came to be known as the fourth generation of Congolese music and mostly come from the former prominent band Wenge Musica.

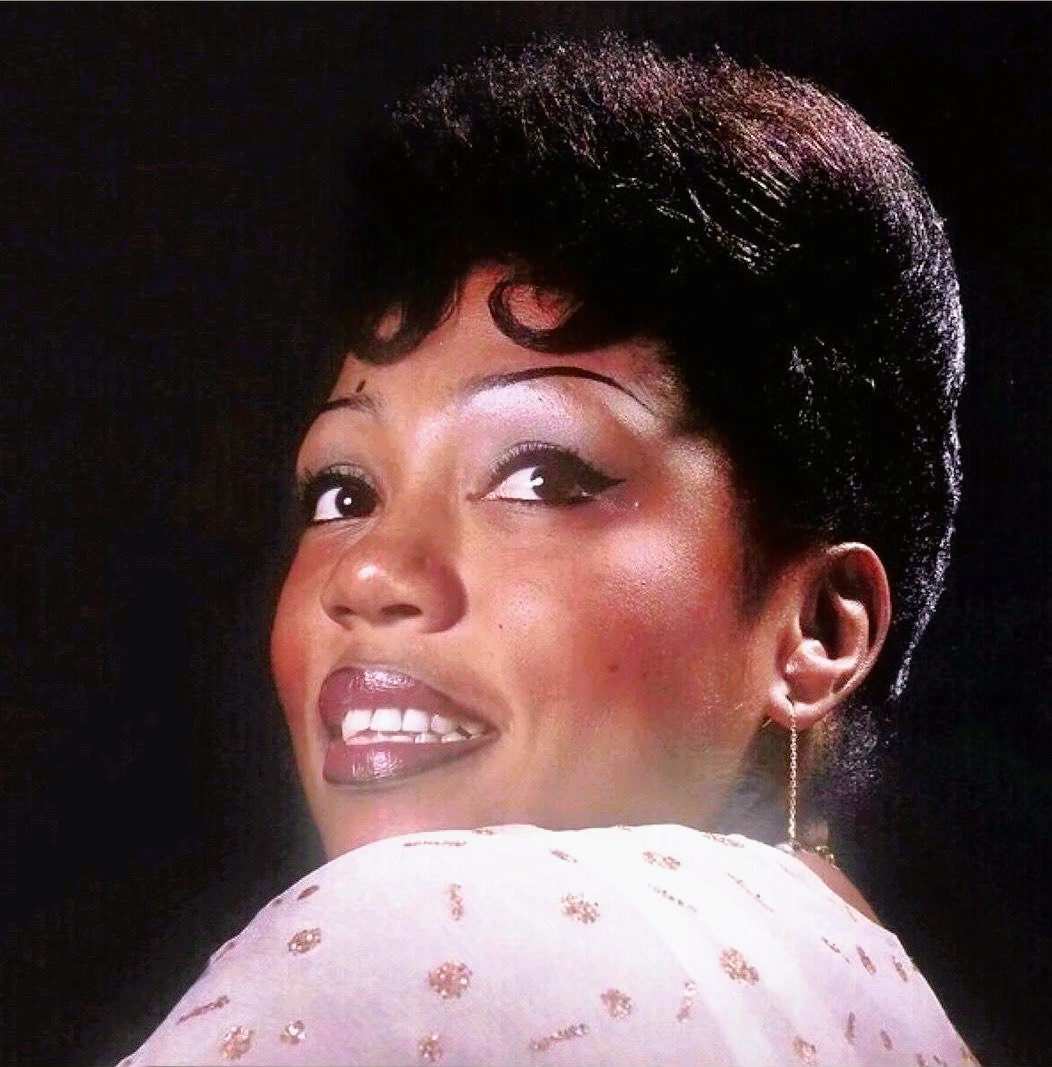
Abeti Masikini in 1978

Political and economic challenges under Mobutu prompted a mass exodus of musicians to Kenya, Tanzania, Uganda, Zambia, Sierra Leone, Liberia, Europe and Asia, expanding the spread of Congolese urban music. Notably, the quartet Ry-Co Jazz played a crucial role in globalizing Congolese music, touring West Africa, the Caribbean, and France. By the 1980s, numerous Congolese musicians were based in Europe, facilitating the global dissemination of their musical prowess. Congolese lead guitarists became a sought-after commodity, attracting bands worldwide eager to infuse a Congolese flavor into their compositions or learn the intricate art of Congolese guitar dexterity.

=== Media ===
Newspapers of the DRC include L'Avenir, Radion Télévision Mwangaza, La Conscience, L'Observateur, Le Phare, Le Potentiel, Le Soft and LeCongolais.CD, a web-based daily. Radio Télévision Nationale Congolaise (RTNC) is the national broadcaster of the Democratic Republic of the Congo. RTNC currently broadcasts in Lingala and French.

=== Cuisine ===
The cuisine of the Democratic Republic of the Congo varies widely, representing the food of indigenous people. Cassava, fufu, rice, plantain and potatoes are generally the staple foods.

=== Sports ===
Many sports are played in the DRC, including football, basketball, baseball, and rugby. The sports are played in numerous stadiums throughout the country, including the Stade Frederic Kibassa Maliba.

As Zaire, they participated in the 1974 FIFA World Cup, where they would be drawn into a group containing Scotland, Yugoslavia, and Brazil. The team would concede fourteen goals and fail to score, finishing bottom of the group.

In the 2026 FIFA World Cup the DRC drew with Portugal on the way to finishing third in their group and progressing to the knockout stage, where they put up a magnificent performance against England in the round of 32 but lost 2-1.

Internationally, the country is especially famous for its professional basketball NBA and football players. Dikembe Mutombo is one of the best African basketball players to ever play the game. Mutombo is well known for humanitarian projects in his home country. Bismack Biyombo, Christian Eyenga, Jonathan Kuminga, and Emmanuel Mudiay are others who gained significant international attention in basketball. Several Congolese players and players of Congolese descent—including Romelu Lukaku, Yannick Bolasie, Yoane Wissa, and Dieumerci Mbokani—have gained prominence in world football. DR Congo has twice won the African Cup of Nations football tournament.

DR Congo's women's national volleyball team lastly qualified for the 2021 Women's African Nations Volleyball Championship. The country featured a national team in beach volleyball that competed at the 2018–2020 CAVB Beach Volleyball Continental Cup in both the women's and the men's section.

== See also ==
- Outline of the Democratic Republic of the Congo
- Democratic Republic of the Congo–South Sudan border
- History of the Jews in the Democratic Republic of the Congo
