= Ilunga government =

Democratic Republic of the Congo government led by Sylvestre Ilunga

The Ilunga government, from September 2019 to April 2021, was the Democratic Republic of the Congo government led by Sylvestre Ilunga as Prime Minister. President Tshisekedi signed the nomination order for the Ilunga government on 26 August 2019, and Ilunga assumed office on 7 September 2019.

== Membership ==
The members of the Ilunga government were:

- Prime Minister: Sylvestre Ilunga Ilunkamba

Deputy prime ministers:

- Minister of the Interior, Security and Traditional Affairs: Gilbert Kankonde Malamba
- Minister of Justice, Keeper of the Seals: Célestin Tunda Yakasende
- Minister of the Budget: Jean-Baudouin Mayo
- Minister of Planning: Élysée Minembwe
- Minister of Infrastructure and Public Works: Willy Ngopos

Ministers of state:

- Minister of Foreign Affairs: Marie Tumba Nzeza
- Minister of International Cooperation, Regional Integration and Francophonie: Guillaume Manjolo
- Minister of Hydrocarbons: Rubens Mukindo
- Minister of Decentralization and Institutional Reform: Azarias Ruberwa
- Minister of Water Resources and Electricity: Eustache Mubembe
- Minister of Employment, Labour and Social Security: Néné Nkulu Ilunga
- Minister of Primary, Secondary and Technical Education: Béatrice Lomeya
- Minister of Town Planning and Housing: Pius Mwabilu
- Minister of Communication and the Media: Jolino Makelele

Other ministers:

- Minister of National Defence and War Veterans: Aimé Ngoyi Mukena
- Minister of Public Services: Yolande Ebongo Osongo
- Minister of Finance: José Sele
- Minister of the National Economy: Atasia Andu Bola
- Minister of Portfolio: Clément Kwete
- Minister of External Trade: Jean-Lucien Bussa
- Minister of Mining: Willy Itobo
- Minister of Postal Services, Telecommunications and New Information and Communication Services: Augustin Kibasa Maliba
- Minister of Health: Eteni Longondo
- Minister of Human Rights: André Lite
- Minister of Relations with Parliament: Deogratias Nkusu Bikawa
- Minister of the Environment and Sustainable Development: Claude Nyamugabo
- Minister of Transport and Communications: Didier Mazengu
- Minister of Agriculture: Jean Joseph Kasonga Mukuta
- Minister of Fishing and Stockbreeding: Jonathan Yalusuka Wata
- Minister of Rural Development: Guy Mukulu Pombo
- Minister of Social Affairs: Rose Boyata Monkaju
- Minister of Humanitarian Actions and National Solidarity: Steve Mbikayi Mabuluki.
- Minister of Higher and University Education: Thomas Luhaka
- Minister of Scientific Research and Technological Innovation: José Mpanda Kabangu
- Minister of Land Management: Aimé Sakombi Molendo
- Ministry of Industry: Julien Paluku
- Minister of Professional Training, Arts and Crafts: John Ntumba
- Minister of Land Development: Aggeé Aje Matembo
- Minister of Entrepreneurship and Small and Medium-sized Enterprises: Justin Kalumba
- Minister of Youth and Initiation of New Citizenship: Herastone Sambale
- Minister of Sport and Leisure: Amos Mbayo
- Minister of Tourism: Yves Bokunlu Zola
- Minister of Culture and the Arts: Jean-Marie Lukundji Kikuni
- Minister to the President of the Republic: André Kabanda Kana
- Minister to the Prime Minister: Jacqueline Penge Sanganyoi

Minister-delegates:

- Delegate to the Minister of National Defense and Veterans Affairs in charge of veterans: Sylvain Mutombo Kabinga
- Delegate to the Minister of the Interior Security and Traditional Affairs in charge of Traditional Affairs: Michel Mvunzi Meya
- Delegate to the Minister of Social Affairs in charge of people living with handicaps and other vulnerable persons: Irène Esambo

Deputy ministers:

- Deputy Minister of Justice: Bernard Takaishe Ngumbi
- Deputy Minister of the Interior: Innocent Bokele Walaka
- Deputy Minister of Planning: Freddy Kita Pukusu
- Deputy Minister of the Budget: Félix Momat Kitenge
- Deputy Minister of Foreign Affairs and Congolese Abroad: Raymond Tshedia Patayi
- Deputy Minister of International and Regional Cooperation: Valérie Mukasa Muanabute
- Deputy Minister of Water Resources and Electricity: Papy Pungu Lwamba
- Deputy Minister of Primary, Secondary and Technical Education: Didier Budimbu
- Deputy Minister of Finance: Mata Melanga Junior
- Deputy Minister of National Economy: Didier Lutundula Okito
- Deputy Minister of Mining: Alpha Denise Lupetu
- Deputy Minister of Health: Albert Mpeti Biyombo
- Deputy Minister of the Environment: Jeanne Ilunga Zahina
- Deputy Minister of Higher and University Education: Liliane Banga
- Deputy Minister of Transport and Communication: Jacques Yuma Kipuya
- Deputy Minister of Professional Training, Arts and Crafts: Germain Kambinga
