= COVID-19 pandemic in the Democratic Republic of the Congo =

- Disease: COVID-19
- Pathogen: SARS-CoV-2
- Location: DR Congo
- First outbreak: Wuhan, Hubei, China
- Index case: Kinshasa
- Arrival date: 10 March 2020 (6 years, 7 months, 2 weeks and 4 days)
- Confirmed cases: 101,010
- Recovered: 94,181
- Deaths: 1,474
- Vaccinations: Updated 18 Sep 2026: 17,045,720 (total vaccinated); 14,399,520 (fully vaccinated); 18,808,672 (doses administered)

Government website
- www.stopcoronavirusrdc.info

The COVID-19 pandemic in the Democratic Republic of the Congo was a part of the worldwide pandemic of coronavirus disease 2019 (COVID-19) caused by severe acute respiratory syndrome coronavirus 2 (SARS-CoV-2). The virus was confirmed to have reached the Democratic Republic of the Congo on 10 March 2020. The first few confirmed cases were all outside arrivals.

== Background ==
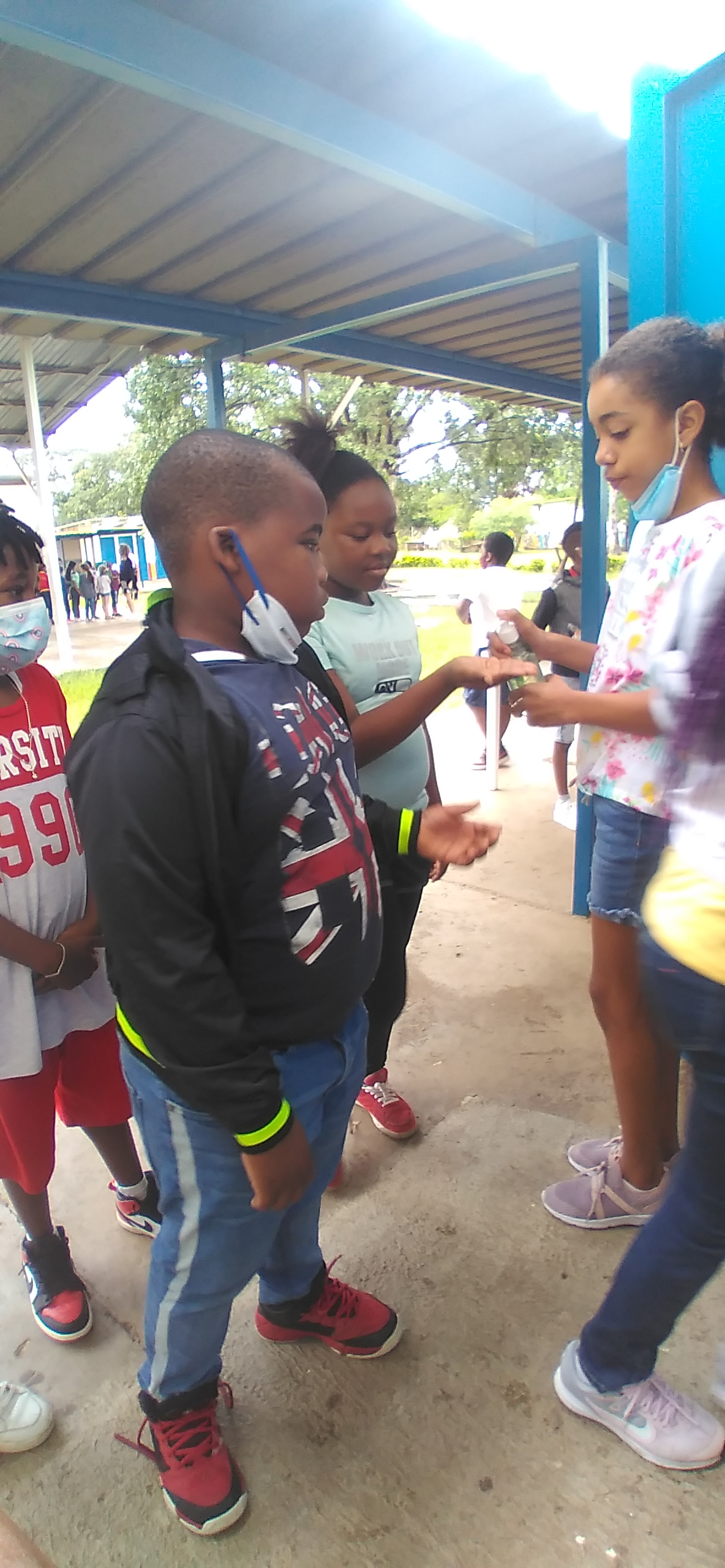
Sanitising hands before entering classroom (March 2021)

The Democratic Republic of the Congo is one of the poorest countries in the world, and access to health care is limited. The DRC has been battling the Kivu Ebola epidemic since 2018, and this epidemic was still ongoing when the COVID-19 crisis began.

On 10 January 2020, the World Health Organization (WHO) confirmed that a novel coronavirus was the cause of a respiratory illness in a cluster of people in Wuhan, Hubei, China, which was reported to the WHO on 31 December 2019.

The WHO, through its director general Tedros Adhanom, expressed on 27 February 2020 its "greatest concern" for Africa, especially Sub-Saharan Africa, highlighting the weaknesses of the healthcare systems of most of the region's countries.

=== Prevention measures ===
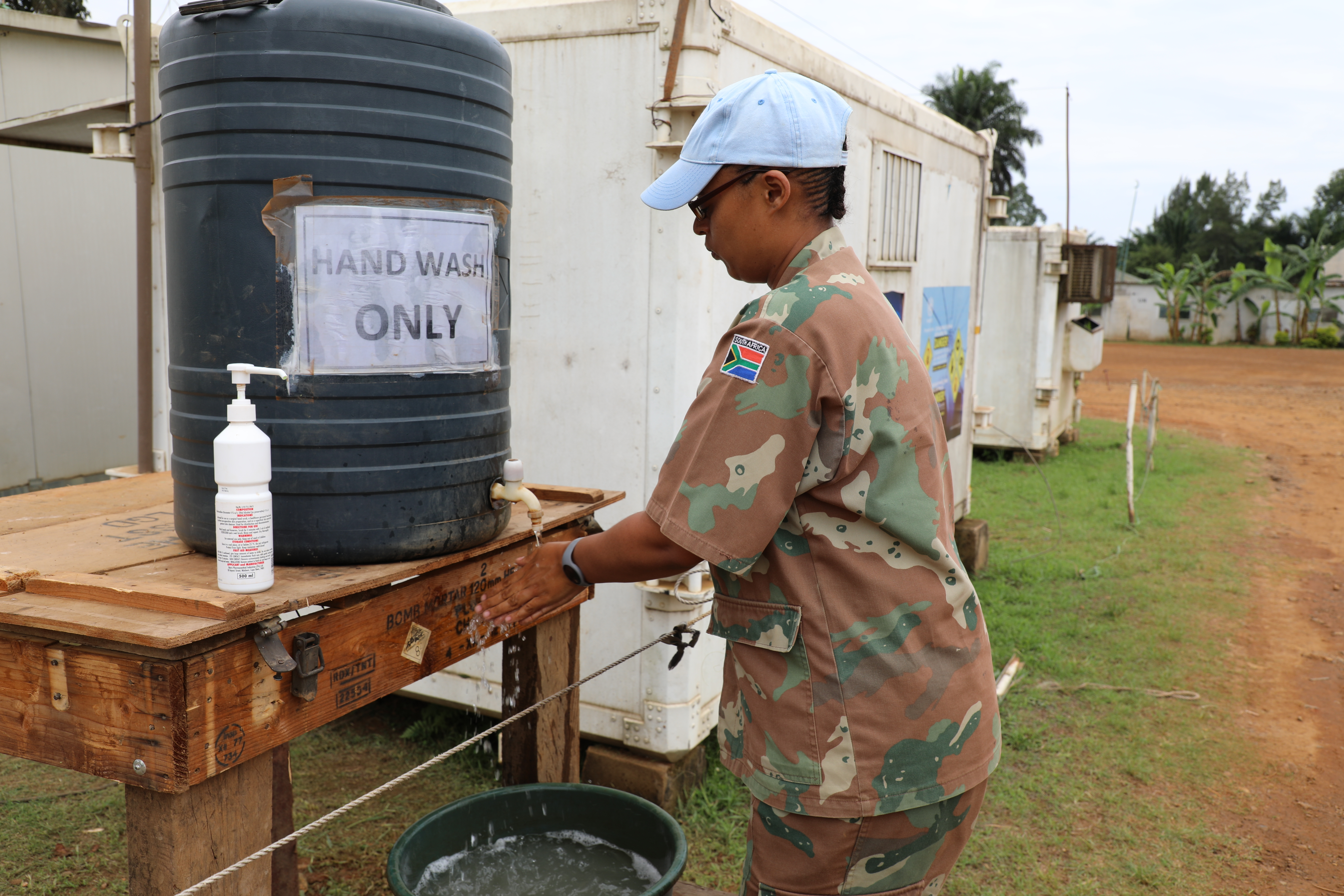
The MONUSCO Force Intervention Brigade has taken measures to boost hygiene to help slow the spread of the virus.

Schools, bars, restaurants, and places of worship were closed. On 19 March, President Félix Tshisekedi announced flight suspensions. The president imposed a state of emergency and closed the borders.

== Timeline ==
=== March 2020 ===
On 10 March, the first case was reported in the country. The case was initially reported to be a Belgian national who visited the country and was later quarantined in a hospital in Kinshasa. The Health Minister of the DRC, Eteni Longondo, said that the situation is "under control" and that "there is no need to panic". The nationality and travel history of the first case turned out to be incorrect. The case was actually a Congolese citizen who had returned from France and contacted health services. The failure to report accurate details on the first case sparked a rebuke from President Félix Tshisekedi who stated in a cabinet meeting that the health ministry had acted in an "appalling and mediocre" way.

The second case was confirmed to be a Cameroonian national in the country, who returned from France on 8 March. Initially asymptomatic, he later developed symptoms and received treatment in a hospital in Kinshasa. After five more confirmed cases, the first death in the country was reported, following announcements that Angola will be closing the border with the DRC.

During the month there were 109 confirmed cases, eight of whom died while four recovered in March.

=== April to June 2020 ===
There were 463 new cases in April, raising the total number of confirmed cases to 572. The death toll rose to 31. The number of recovered patients increased to 65, with 476 active cases at the end of the month. In May there were 2476 new cases, bringing the total number of confirmed cases to 3048. The death toll more than doubled to 71.

On 1 June, a new Ebola outbreak was declared in Mbandaka. In conjunction with the COVID-19 pandemic, the ongoing Kivu Ebola epidemic, and the world's largest measles outbreak, the situation has been described as a "perfect storm" by the Red Cross. On 16 June, a crowd ransacked a coronavirus treatment centre in South Kivu in response to the killing of a young man, rumoured to have been killed by police enforcing a virus curfew. On 29 June 2020, Albert M’peti Biyombo, DRC deputy health minister, wrote a letter to the Prime Minister accusing the cabinet members of colluding with networks within the health ministry to embezzle funds from the government and its aid partners.

During June there were 3990 new cases, bringing the total number of confirmed cases to 7038. The death toll rose to 169.

=== July to September 2020 ===
There were 2031 new cases in July, raising the total number of confirmed cases to 9069. The death toll rose to 214. The number of recovered patients reached 6796, leaving 2059 active cases at the end of the month. There were 1028 new cases in August, raising the total number of confirmed cases to 10,097. The death toll rose to 260. There were 706 active cases at the end of the month. There were 534 new cases in September, bringing the total number of confirmed cases to 10,631. The death toll rose to 272. The number of recovered patients increased to 10,129, leaving 230 active cases at the end of the month.

=== October to December 2020 ===
There were 764 new cases in October, bringing the total number of confirmed cases to 11,395. The death toll rose to 308. The number of recovered patients increased to 10790, leaving 297 active cases at the end of the month. There were 1377 new cases in November, raising the total number of confirmed cases to 12,772. The death toll rose to 333. The number of recovered patients increased to 11585, leaving 854 active cases at the end of the month.

On 18 November, the government announced that it has managed to contain an outbreak of Ebola in Equateur Province after assistance from the World Health Organization (WHO). The response included over 40,000 Ebola vaccinations, which like several COVID-19 vaccine candidates need to be stored at super-cold temperatures. The WHO Regional Director for Africa, Dr. Matshidiso Moeti, states that the response has provided several lessons for the global fight against COVID and has built local capacity.

There were 4886 new cases in December, raising the total number of confirmed cases to 17,658. The death toll rose to 591. The number of recovered patients increased to 14,701, leaving 2366 active cases at the end of the month. Model-based simulations indicate that the 95% confidence interval for the time-varying reproduction number R_{t} was lower than 1.0 in December and January.

=== January to March 2021 ===
There were 5113 new cases in January, taking the total number of confirmed cases to 22,771. The death toll rose to 671. The number of recovered patients increased to 15,031, leaving 7069 active cases at the end of the month. There were 3190 new cases in February, taking the total number of confirmed cases to 25,961. The death toll rose to 707. The number of recovered patients increased to 18,950, leaving 6304 active cases at the end of the month.

=== April to June 2021 ===
Vaccinations started on 19 April, initially with 1.7 million doses of the Covishield vaccine supplied through the COVAX mechanism. After administering only 1700 doses in the first week of the vaccination campaign, health officials announced that 1.3 million doses would be returned for redistribution to other countries (495,000 to Angola, 350,000 to Ghana, 250,000 to Madagascar, 140,000 to Togo and 80,000 to the Central African Republic).

There were 1762 new cases in April, taking the total number of confirmed cases to 29,904. The death toll rose to 768. The number of recovered patients increased to 26,250, leaving 2886 active cases at the end of the month.

By mid-May, only 5,000 individuals had been given the vaccine, out of a population of 90 million people.

There were 1747 new cases in May, taking the total number of confirmed cases to 31,651. The death toll rose to 782. The number of recovered patients increased to 27,665, leaving 3204 active cases at the end of the month.

In June the WHO warmed of a surge in cases linked to the Indian (Delta) variant. There were 9790 new cases in June, raising the total number of confirmed cases to 41,241. The death toll rose to 928. The number of recovered patients increased to 28,412, leaving 11,901 active cases at the end of the month.

=== July to September 2021 ===
There were 8676 new cases in July, raising the total number of confirmed cases to 49,917. The death toll rose to 1038. The number of recovered patients increased to 29,944, leaving 18,935 active cases at the end of the month.

There were 4946 new cases in August, bringing the total number of confirmed cases to 54,863. The death toll rose to 1059. The number of recovered patients increased to 31,054, leaving 22,750 active cases at the end of the month.

There were 2074 new cases in September, bringing the total number of confirmed cases to 56,937. The death toll rose to 1084. The number of recovered patients increased to 47,384, leaving 8469 active cases at the end of the month.

=== October to December 2021 ===
There were 628 new cases in October, bringing the total number of confirmed cases to 57,565. The death toll rose to 1098. The number of recovered patients increased to 50,977, leaving 5490 active cases at the end of the month.

There were 741 new cases in November, bringing the total number of confirmed cases to 58,306. The death toll rose to 1107. The number of recovered patients increased to 50,930, leaving 6269 active cases at the end of the month.

The presence of the omicron variant was confirmed by health officials on 13 December.

There were 16,487 new cases in December, raising the total number of confirmed cases to 74,793. The death toll rose to 1205. The number of recovered patients increased to 57,579, leaving 16,009 active cases at the end of the month. Modelling by WHO's Regional Office for Africa suggests that due to under-reporting, the true cumulative number of infections by the end of 2021 was around 40 million while the true number of COVID-19 deaths was around 27,415.

=== January to March 2022 ===
There were 10,716 new cases in January, raising the total number of confirmed cases to 85,509. The death toll rose to 1278. The number of recovered patients increased to 64,656, leaving 19,575 active cases at the end of the month.

There were 629 new cases in February, bringing the total number of confirmed cases to 86,138. The death toll rose to 1335.

There were 610 new cases in March, bringing the total number of confirmed cases to 86,748. The death toll rose to 1337.

=== April to June 2022 ===
There were 641 new cases in April, bringing the total number of confirmed cases to 87,389. The death toll rose to 1338.

There were 1813 new cases in May, bringing the total number of confirmed cases to 89,202. The death toll remained unchanged.

There were 2191 new cases in June, bringing the total number of confirmed cases to 91,393. The death toll rose to 1375.

=== July to September 2022 ===
There were 1063 new cases in July, bringing the total number of confirmed cases to 92,456. The death toll rose to 1391.

There were 179 new cases in August, bringing the total number of confirmed cases to 92,635. The death toll rose to 1405.

There were 281 new cases in September, bringing the total number of confirmed cases to 92,916. The death toll rose to 1442.

=== October to December 2022 ===
There were 171 new cases in October, bringing the total number of confirmed cases to 93,087. The death toll rose to 1445.

There were 1328 new cases in November, bringing the total number of confirmed cases to 94,415. The death toll rose to 1455.

There were 842 new cases in December, bringing the total number of confirmed cases to 95,257. The death toll rose to 1460.

=== January to December 2023 ===
There were 4081 new cases in 2023, bringing the total number of confirmed cases to 99,338. The death toll rose to 1468.

== Statistics ==
=== Charts ===
==== Confirmed new cases per day ====
View source data.

==== Confirmed deaths per day ====
View source data.

== Consequences ==
=== Political ===
On 15 March 2020, the two chambers of parliament (the National Assembly and Senate) released a joint statement indicating the suspension of their activities from 15 March to 5 April due to the pandemic.

The government itself has also been greatly affected by the coronavirus. During a special meeting of the Council of Ministers on 17 March, the Minister of the National Economy Acacia Bandubola Mbongo began to present symptoms. She and her husband subsequently tested positive for COVID-19, having been contaminated by her brother and cabinet minister Dédié Bandubola upon his return from a trip to France. The latter died a few days later, marking the first death of a Congolese citizen from the virus. Several other government ministers were tested for COVID-19 after having attended the same meeting, but only Minister of Justice Célestin Tunda Ya Kasende made his "negative" test result public.

Several other people close to president Félix Tshisekedi tested positive, with some even dying, including his uncle and leader of the civil cabinet Gérard Mulumba Kalemba and Jean-Joseph Mukendi wa Mulumba, Bâtonnier and former political advisor to Étienne Tshisekedi.

On 3 April, former health minister and member of the Common Front for Congo Félix Kabange Numbi Mukwampa criticized the government's decision to only confine the Gombe municipality instead of confining all of Kinshasa. He also stated his belief that the government has not been capable of helping the country's poorest populations, saying that he fears their reactions if the number of deaths increases.

A political crisis began to simmer in the heart of the ruling coalition; the President of the National Assembly Jeannine Mabunda and Senate President Alexis Thambwe Mwamba, both close to former president Joseph Kabila, accused Felix Tshisekedi of having declared a state of emergency without prior parliamentary authorization and attempted to organize a congress to "correct this irregularity." The presidential camp refused, and the Constitutional Court eventually ruled in favor of the chief of state. A vote to extend the state of emergency by two weeks passed on 23 April, putting an end to the political crisis.

By 28 May 2021, 32 members of the DRC parliament, making up 5% of the MPs, died due to COVID.

=== Economic ===
On 22 April, the International Monetary Fund (IMF) announced its decision to release 363.27 million dollars in order to help the DRC as a part of its Rapid Credit Facility plan. 27 April, prime minister Sylvestre Ilunga announced that the eleven billion-dollar budget planned for 2020 would not be able to be implemented due to the pandemic. The economic context has indeed been greatly impacted; the DRC, having an outward-oriented economy, is very dependent on its commerce with the rest of the world. This budget, approved in late 2019, was at the time criticized by the IMF, who found it to be "unrealistic."

In addition, lockdown measures are difficult to implement and enforce economically, especially in Kinshasa, where a large portion of the population lives in precarious conditions. The movement Lutte pour le changement said it feared a "humanitarian catastrophe or riots" when authorities announced the lockdown towards the end of March 2020. The lockdown risks to deprive many residents of their income, even exposing some to the risk of starvation, since preventing people from leaving their home effectively prevents them from being able to earn money to feed themselves. Social distancing and confinement endanger the informal economy that employs more than 77% of the Congolese population and allows many households to survive from day to day.

=== Social ===
An explosion in cases of domestic violence against women was observed during the lockdown, with victims being forced to remain shut away with their abusers. An increase in divorces in Kinshasa was also observed.

The rise in the unemployment rate, already underway in Kinshasa before the pandemic, intensified, and a resurgence of banditry (most notably armed robbery) also occurred.

== See also ==
- COVID-19 pandemic in Africa
- COVID-19 pandemic by country and territory
- COVID-19 vaccination in the Democratic Republic of the Congo
