= Rubens Mukindo =

Congolese politician

Minister of Hydrocarbons of Democratic Republic of the Congo
- In office 2019–2021
- President: Sylvestre Ilunga

Personal details
- Born: Democratic Republic of the Congo
- Party: Union for Democracy and Social Progress
- Occupation: Politician

Rubens Mukindo Muhima is a Congolese politician. He was a Minister of Hydrocarbons of Democratic Republic of the Congo, under Ilunga government that ran from September 2019 to April 2021, as well as a member of parliament. He is a member of Union for Democracy and Social Progress.

In 2020, Mukindo met Prime Minister, Jean-Baudouin Mayo, the Minister of National Economy, Acacia Bandubola and the Minister of Finance, Sélé Yalaghuli, to assess the evolution of the oil sector and its implications.

Preceded by	Minister of Hydrocarbons of Democratic Republic of the Congo	Succeeded by
