= Paul Panda Farnana Administrative Building =

Government building in Lingwala, Kinshasa

- Bâtiment Administratif Paul Panda Farnana (French)
- Exterior view
- Alternative names: Government Administrative Building

General information
- Location: Boulevard Triomphal, Lingwala, Kinshasa, Democratic Republic of the Congo
- Year built: 2015–2017
- Construction started: 28 August 2015; 11 years ago
- Inaugurated: 11 December 2017; 8 years ago
- Cost: US$36 million
- Owner: Government of the Democratic Republic of the Congo

Technical details
- Floor count: 5
- Lifts/elevators: 6

Design and construction
- Main contractor: Jiangsu Nantong No.3 Construction Group Co., Ltd

The Paul Panda Farnana Administrative Building (French: Bâtiment administratif Paul Panda Farnana), also known as the Government Administrative Building (Bâtiment administratif du Gouvernement), is a government office building on Boulevard Triomphal in Lingwala, Kinshasa, Democratic Republic of the Congo. Located between the Palais du Peuple and the headquarters of the Congolese National Police, it was built with Chinese government funding to bring several ministries' administrative services into one building. The project cost US$36 million, with construction beginning on 28 August 2015. President Joseph Kabila inaugurated it on 11 December 2017.

== History ==
=== Site and construction ===
The site previously housed the Tembe Na Tembe supermarket. According to Kinshasa Governor André Kimbuta Yango, private villas had been built on the site before President Joseph Kabila instructed the city authorities to demolish them and reserve the land for another project.

Plans for the administrative building were announced during the inauguration of the separate Government Building (Hôtel du Gouvernement) on Boulevard du 30 Juin on 20 July 2015. Foreign Minister Raymond Tshibanda laid the foundation stone on 28 August 2015. China funded the project through economic and technical cooperation agreements with the DRC, and construction was expected to take about two years. Actualite.cd named Jiangsu Nantong No.3 Construction Group Co., Ltd as the contractor, with the final cost of US$36 million.

=== Inauguration, design and facilities ===
Kabila inaugurated the building on 11 December 2017 in a ceremony attended by government officials and Chinese representatives. Speakers included Kimbuta, a vice-president of Jiangsu International Group, China's ambassador to the DRC, and Deputy Foreign Minister Aggée Aje Matembo Toto. The ceremony also included a ribbon-cutting, the handover of a symbolic key and a tour of the building. Officials said the new offices would house the general secretariats of several ministries and help lower rental expenses. On 6 April 2018, Deputy Prime Minister and Minister of the Interior and Security Henri Mova Sakanyi, his deputy Basile Olongo and their staff moved into the building. The third and fourth floors were reserved for the minister's office.

With an area of 20,600 square meters, the building can accommodate 1,400 people across five levels: a ground floor and four upper floors. It has six elevators, 135 administrative offices, 133 support-staff offices and 20 meeting rooms, along with rooms for conferences and training. Plans released when construction began put its height at around 24 meters and included toilets, changing rooms, equipment rooms and documentation rooms. The Congolese government was initially tasked with furnishing the first-floor offices, while China would furnish the rest. At the inauguration, China's ambassador said the building was fully furnished and ready for use.
