= Gilbert Kankonde Malamba =

Congolese politician

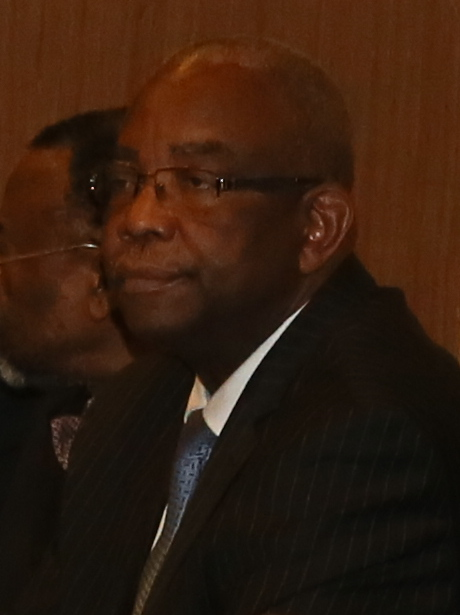
- Born: Democratic Republic of the Congo
- Occupation: Politician

Gilbert Kankonde Malamba is a Congolese politician. He was the former Minister of the Interior and Security, Decentralization, and Customary Affairs of Democratic Republic of Congo, under Ilunga government from September 2019 to April 2021, and a member of parliament. He is also a member of Union for Democracy and Social Progress.
