= Ntumba =

Ntumba is a Congolese name that may refer to

Given name

- Ntumba Luaba, Democratic Republic of the Congo politician
- Ntumba Massanka (born 1996), English footballer

Surname

- Amanda Ngandu-Ntumba (born 2000), French discus thrower and shot putter
- Artyom Ntumba (born 2003), Russian football player of Congolese descent
- Francis Ntumba Danga (born 1963), Congolese former professional footballer
- Gilbert Tshiongo Tshibinkubula wa Ntumba (1942–2021), Congolese engineer, politician, and civil servant
- John Ntumba, Congolese politician
- Lévi Ntumba (born 2001), French footballer
- Manuel Ntumba, Congolese-Togolese inventor, advisor, geostrategist and geospatial expert
- Marie Ntumba Nzeza, Congolese politician and diplomat
- Nimi a Lukeni a Nzenze a Ntumba (died 1641), ruler of the Kingdom of Kongo
- Nkanga a Lukeni a Nzenze a Ntumba (died 1660), ruler of the Kingdom of Kongo
