= Willy Itobo =

Congolese politician

Minister of Mining of Democratic Republic of the Congo
- In office September 2019 – April 2021

Personal details
- Born: Democratic Republic of the Congo
- Party: Union for Democracy and Social Progress
- Occupation: Politician

Willy Itobo is a Congolese politician. He was the Minister of Mining of Democratic Republic of the Congo, under Ilunga government that ran from September 2019 to April 2021, as well as a member of parliament. He is the member of Union for Democracy and Social Progress.
