= Yuma Kipuya =

Congolese politician

- Born: Democratic Republic of the Congo
- Occupation: Politician

Yuma Kipuya is a Congolese politician. In 2019, Kipuya was appointed as the Deputy Minister of Transport and Communication: Jacques of Democratic Republic of the Congo, under Ilunga government that ran from September 2019 to April 2021, as well as a member of parliament. Kipuya is the member of Union for Democracy and Social Progress.
