= Elysée Munembwe =

Congolese politician

- Born: Democratic Republic of the Congo
- Occupation: Politician

Elysée Munembwe is a Congolese politician. She is the current Minister of Planning of Democratic Republic of the Congo, chosen under Ilunga government that ran from September 2019 to April 2021, as well as a member of parliament. She is the member of Union for Democracy and Social Progress.
