= Jeanne Ilunga Zahina =

Congolese politician

- Born: Democratic Republic of the Congo
- Occupation: Politician

Jeanne Ilunga Zahina is a Congolese politician. In 2019, Zahina was appointed as the Deputy Minister of Environment of Democratic Republic of the Congo, under Ilunga government that ran from September 2019 to April 2021, as well as a member of parliament. Zahina is the member of Union for Democracy and Social Progress.
