= Eyrolles Michel Mvunzi Meya =

Congolese politician

- Born: Democratic Republic of the Congo
- Occupation: Politician

Eyrolles Michel Mvunzi Meya (4 August 1974 – 16 December 2020) was a Congolese politician.

In 2019, he was appointed as the Delegate to the Minister of the Interior Security and Traditional Affairs in charge of Traditional Affairs of Democratic Republic of the Congo, in the Ilunga government that ran from September 2019 to April 2021, and also served as a member of the National Assembly.

He was a member of Union for Democracy and Social Progress.

He died from COVID-19 on 16 December 2020 at age 46.
