= Willy Ngopos =

Congolese politician

- Born: Democratic Republic of the Congo
- Occupation: Politician

Willy Ngopos is a Congolese politician. He was the former Minister of Infrastructure and Public Works of Democratic Republic of the Congo, under Ilunga government that ran from September 2019 to April 2021, as well as a member of parliament. He is the member of Union for Democracy and Social Progress.
