= Liliane Banga =

Congolese politician

- Born: Democratic Republic of the Congo
- Occupation: Politician

Liliane Banga is a Congolese politician. In 2019, Banga was appointed as the Deputy Minister of Higher and University Education of Democratic Republic of the Congo, under Ilunga government that ran from September 2019 to April 2021, as well as a member of parliament. Banga is the member of Union for Democracy and Social Progress.
