= André Kabanda Kana =

Congolese politician (born 1952)

- Born: 26 September 1952 (age 73); Democratic Republic of the Congo
- Occupation: Politician

André Kabanda Kana (born 26 September 1952) is a Congolese politician. In 2019, he was appointed as the Minister to the President of the Republic of Democratic Republic of the Congo, under Ilunga government that ran from September 2019 to April 2021, as well as a member of parliament. He is a member of Union for Democracy and Social Progress.
