= Rose Boyata Monkaju =

Congolese politician

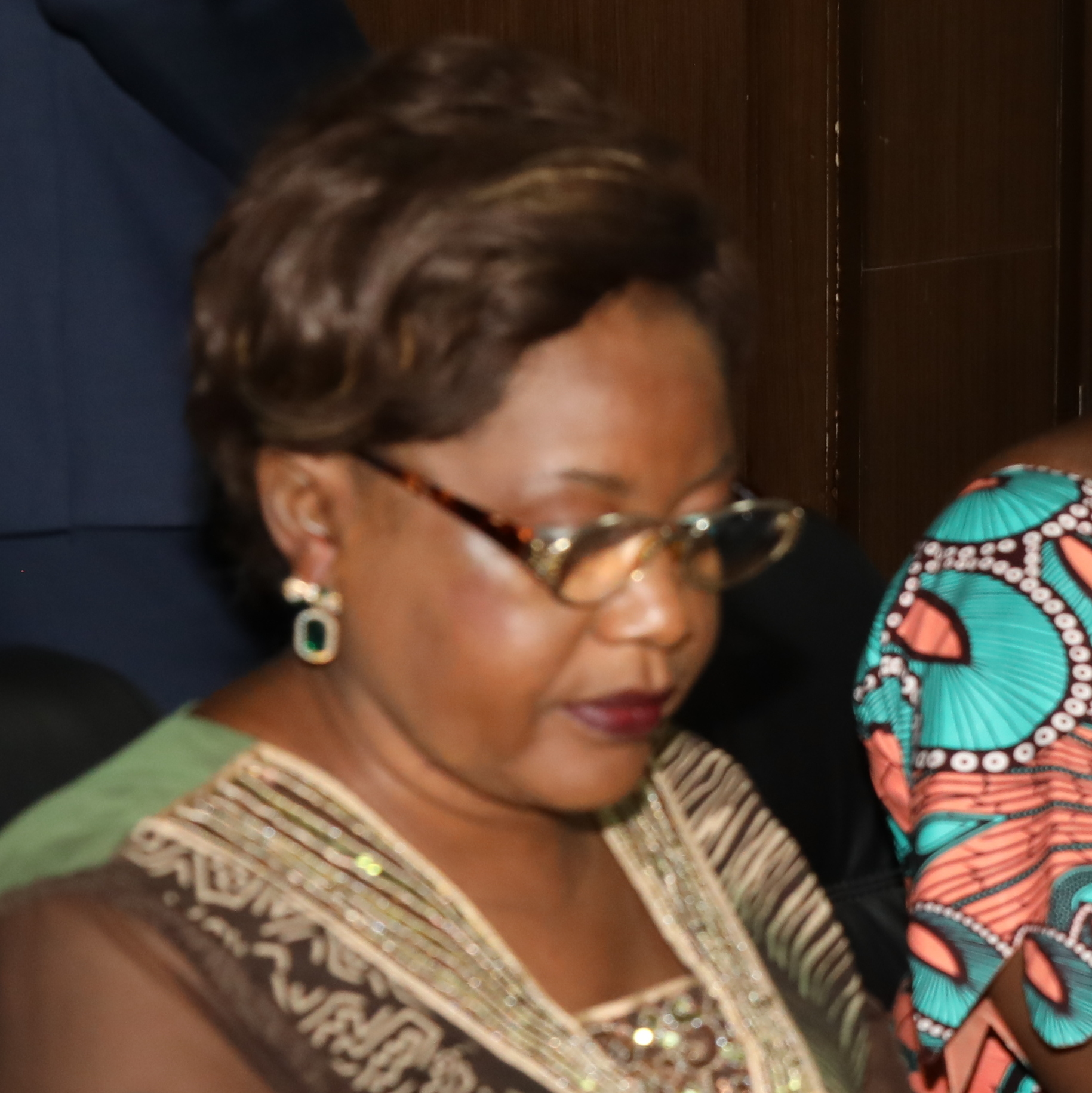
- Born: 23 December 1968; Kinshasa
- Alma mater: Université Libre de Kinshasa
- Occupation: Politician, minister
- Political party: Union for Democracy and Social Progress
- Position held: Minister of Social Affairs (2019–2021)

Rose Boyata Monkaju is a Congolese politician. In 2019, she was appointed as the Minister of Social Affairs of Democratic Republic of the Congo, under Ilunga government that ran from September 2019 to April 2021, as well as a member of parliament. She is a member of Union for Democracy and Social Progress.
