= Jean-Marie Lukundji Kikuni =

Congolese politician

- Born: Democratic Republic of the Congo
- Occupation: Politician

Children: Kenthia Mangaza Lukundji, Keren Makope Lukundji, Hemedi Lukundji Merdi, Anita Batina Lukundji Jean-Marie Lukundji Kikuni is a Congolese politician. In 2019, he was appointed as the Minister of Culture and the Arts of Democratic Republic of the Congo, under Ilunga government that ran from September 2019 to April 2021, as well as a member of parliament. He is a member of Union for Democracy and Social Progress.
