= Ève Bazaiba =

Lawyer, politician and activist in the Democratic Republic of the Congo

Her Excellency Ève Bazaiba
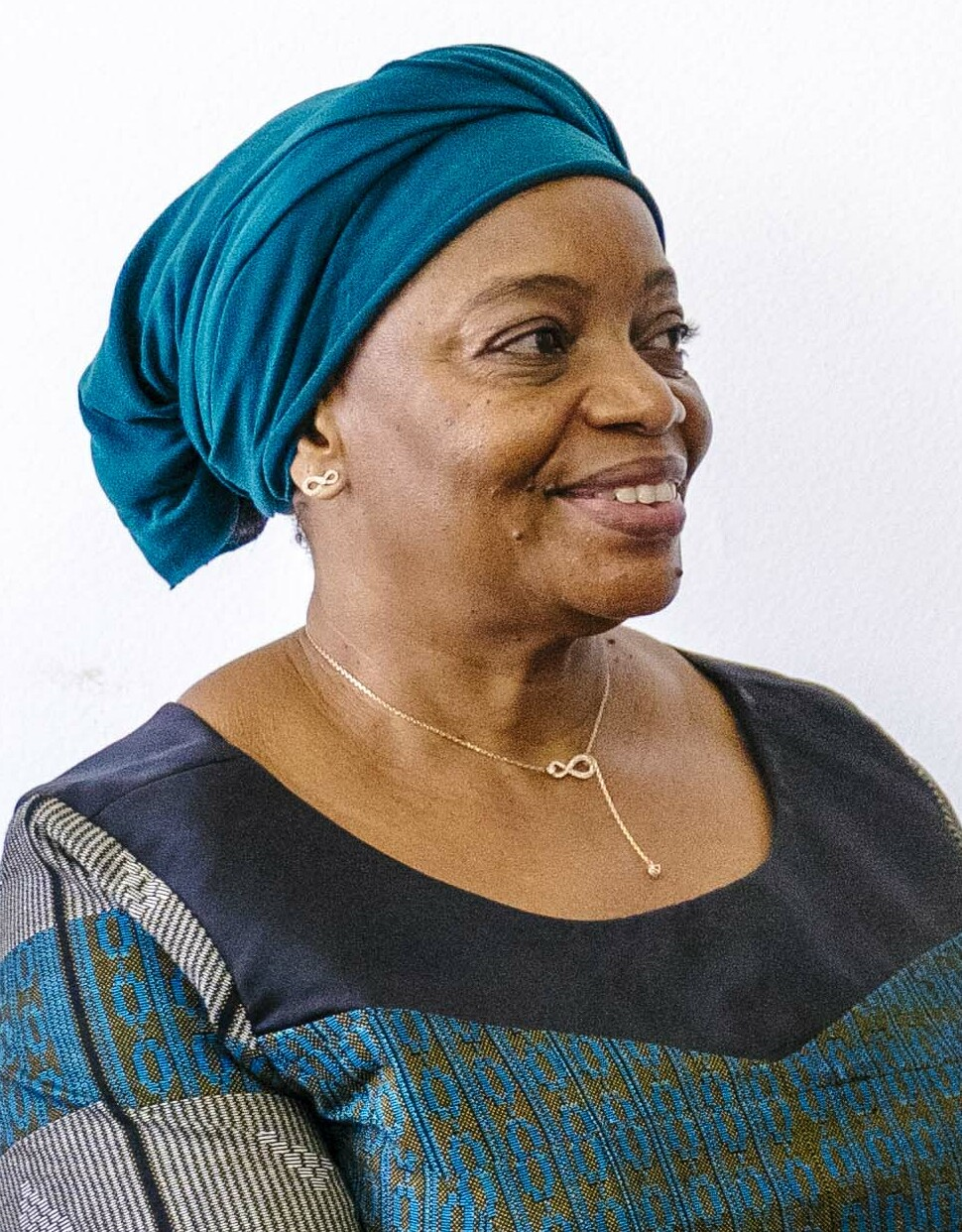
- Eve Bazaiba in 2022

Minister for the Environment of the Democratic Republic of the Congo
- Incumbent
- Assumed office 12 April 2021
- President: Félix Tshisekedi
- Prime Minister: Jean-Michel Sama Lukonde
- Majority: Union Sacrée de la Nation (USN)

Personal details
- Born: Eve Bazaiba; 12 August 1965 (age 60) Kisangani, DR Congo
- Citizenship: Democratic Republic of the Congo
- Party: Movement for the Liberation of the Congo
- Education: Lycée Bosangani (State School Diploma); Cardinal Malula University (Bachelor in International Relations); Protestant University in Congo (Bachelor of Laws)
- Occupation: Lawyer, politician

Ève Bazaiba Masudi (née Ève Bazaiba) (born 12 August 1965) is a Congolese lawyer, politician, and human rights activist. As of May 2019, she served as the Secretary General of the Movement for the Liberation of the Congo (MLC) political party. She is Deputy Prime Minister and Minister for the Environment since 2021.

== Early life and education ==
Ève Bazaiba was born on 12 August 1965 in Stanleyville (today Kisangani), in the Democratic Republic of the Congo. She studied Latin and Philosophy at Bosangani High School (Lycée Bosangani), in Kinshasa before being admitted to Cardinal Malula University, also in Kinshasa, and graduating with a Bachelor of International Relations degree. In 2010 Bazaiba earned a law degree from the Protestant University in the Congo.

== Career ==
In 1988, Bazaiba became an activist for the Union for Democracy and Social Progress (UDPS) political party, led by Étienne Tshisekedi. She was arrested several times under the regime of Mobutu Sese Seko, imprisoned for four days under the regime of Laurent-Desire Kabila and sued by the government of Joseph Kabila for denouncing corruption in the mining industry. In 2002, she participated in the Sun City talks that set up the transitional government that led to the 2006 elections of the Third Republic. When her party, the UDPS boycotted the elections, she personally pleaded with Étienne Tshisekedi and other party leadership to obtain a waiver to contest.

In 2007, she was elected to the Senate as a member of the Movement for the Liberation of the Congo (MLC) political party, by the Kinshasa Provincial Assembly. After serving her five-year term, she became president (chairperson) of the socio-cultural commission at the National Assembly in the Democratic Republic of Congo. She is a strong advocate for human rights and particularly the rights of women and other vulnerable groups. During the 2011–2016 legislative session she proposed a bill that provided for special protections for disabled persons. She re-introduced the bill in 2019.

As of 2019, she served as the Secretary General of the MLC.

== Family ==
Baizaba is a married mother.

== Other responsibilities ==
Eva Baizaba is the president of the League of Congolese Women for Elections (LIFCE).

== See also ==
- Félix Tshisekedi
- Jean-Pierre Bemba
- Acacia Bandubola Mbongo

== Works cited ==
- Mazanza Kindulu, Joseph-Roger (2015). Les femmes dans l'espace décisionnel congolais (in French). Editions L'Harmattan. ISBN 9782336388915.
