= Jolino Makelele =

Congolese politician

- Born: Democratic Republic of the Congo
- Occupation: Politician

Jolino Makelele is a Congolese politician. He was a Minister of Communication and the Media of Democratic Republic of the Congo, under the Ilunga government that ran from September 2019 to April 2021, as well as a member of parliament. He is a member of Union for Democracy and Social Progress.
