= Sylvain Mutombo Kabinga =

Congolese politician

- Born: Democratic Republic of the Congo
- Occupation: Politician

Sylvain Mutombo Kabinga is a Congolese politician. In 2019, he was appointed as the Delegate to the Minister of National Defense and Veterans Affairs in charge of veterans of Democratic Republic of the Congo, under Ilunga government that ran from September 2019 to April 2021, as well as a member of parliament. He is a member of Union for Democracy and Social Progress.
