= Félix Momat Kitenge =

Congolese politician

- Born: Democratic Republic of the Congo
- Occupation: Politician
- Political party: Union for Democracy and Social Progress

Félix Momat Kitenge is a Congolese politician.

In 2019, he was appointed as the Deputy Minister of Budget of Democratic Republic of the Congo under the Ilunga government that ran from September 2019 to April 2021. Kitenge was also a member of parliament.

He is the member of Union for Democracy and Social Progress.
