= Aimé Ngoyi Mukena =

Congolese politician

- Born: Democratic Republic of the Congo
- Occupation: Politician

Aimé Ngoyi Mukena is a Congolese politician. Mukena was the Minister of National Defence and War Veterans of Democratic Republic of the Congo, under the Ilunga government that ran from September 2019 to April 2021, as well as a member of parliament. Mukena is a member of Union for Democracy and Social Progress.
