= Albert Mpeti Biyombo =

Congolese politician

- Born: Democratic Republic of the Congo
- Occupation: Politician

Albert Mpeti Biyombo is a Congolese politician. In 2019, he was appointed as the Deputy Minister of Health of Democratic Republic of the Congo, under Ilunga government that ran from September 2019 to April 2021, as well as a member of parliament. He is the member of Union for Democracy and Social Progress.
