= Yolande Ebongo Osongo =

Congolese politician

- Born: Democratic Republic of the Congo
- Occupation: Politician

Yolande Ebongo Osongo is a Congolese politician. He was the Minister of Public Services of Democratic Republic of the Congo, under Ilunga government that ran from September 2019 to April 2021, as well as a member of parliament. He is a member of Union for Democracy and Social Progress.
