= COVID-19 vaccination in the Democratic Republic of the Congo =

Plan to immunize against COVID-19

- Cause: COVID-19 pandemic

COVID-19 vaccination in the Democratic Republic of the Congo is an ongoing immunisation campaign against severe acute respiratory syndrome coronavirus 2 (SARS-CoV-2), the virus that causes coronavirus disease 2019 (COVID-19), in response to the ongoing pandemic in the country.

The Democratic Republic of the Congo started its COVID-19 vaccination campaign on 19 April 2021 in response to the COVID-19 pandemic in the country. COVID-19 vaccination in the Democratic Republic of the Congo was made possible using COVAX, an international scheme to make safe and effective COVID-19 vaccines worldwide. More than 90% of the doses received are the Oxford-AstraZeneca vaccine manufactured in India. Congo received 1.7 million doses via COVAX. However, DRC administered only around 1000 doses by the end of April, and 1.3 million COVAX doses were returned for redistribution to other African countries before they expire in the end of June. The main reasons for low vaccination rate in Congo are poor healthcare infrastructure, political instability and spread of misinformation.

== History ==
=== Timeline ===
==== May 2021 ====
By the end of the month 23,733 vaccine doses had been administered.

==== June 2021 ====
By the end of the month 59,733 vaccine doses had been administered.

==== July 2021 ====
By the end of the month 86,170 vaccine doses had been administered.

==== August 2021 ====
By the end of the month 94,890 vaccine doses had been administered.

==== September 2021 ====
By the end of the month 137,758 vaccine doses had been administered.

==== October 2021 ====
By the end of the month 148,684 vaccine doses had been administered. Less than 0.2% of the targeted population had been fully vaccinated by the end of the month.

==== November 2021 ====
By the end of the month 186,749 vaccine doses had been administered. Less than 0.3% of the targeted population had been fully vaccinated by the end of the month.

==== December 2021 ====
By the end of the month 333,859 vaccine doses had been administered. Less than 0.4% of the targeted population had been fully vaccinated by the end of the month.

==== January 2022 ====
By the end of the month 468,253 vaccine doses had been administered. Less than 1% of the targeted population had been fully vaccinated by the end of the month.

==== February 2022 ====
By the end of the month 850,731 vaccine doses had been administered and 442,965 persons had been fully vaccinated.

==== March 2022 ====
By the end of the month 881,240 vaccine doses had been administered and 515,732 persons had been fully vaccinated.

== Progress ==
Cumulative vaccinations in the Democratic Republic of the Congo
