= Protestant University in the Congo =

Private university in the Democratic Republic of the Congo

- Motto: Truth, Faith, Freedom
- Type: Private
- Established: 1959; 67 years ago
- Vice-Chancellor: Monsignor Ngoy Boliya Daniel
- Students: 8,000 (2015)
- Location: Lingwala, Kinshasa, Democratic Republic of the Congo; 04°19′59″S 15°17′52″E
- Campus: Urban
- Website: www.upc.ac.cd (French)

Protestant University in the Congo (French: Université protestante au Congo, or UPC), is a university in the Democratic Republic of the Congo, affiliated with the Protestant Church which is known in the country as the Church of Christ in the Congo.

== Location ==
The university's campus is located in the commune called Lingwala, in the Lukunga District of Kinshasa, the capital and largest city of the Democratic Republic of the Congo. The campus is bounded to the west by Avenue Pierre Mulele, immediately north of the Centenary Protestant Cathedral and adjacent to the National Museum of Congo, which lies to the south and south-east of the campus. The geographical coordinates of UPC campus are 4°19'59.0"S, 15°17'52.0"E (Latitude:-4.333056; Longitude:15.297778).

== Overview ==
The UPC traces its origins to the establishment of the Faculty of Protestant Theology of the Belgian Congo and Ruanda-Urundi (Faculté de Théologie Protestante du Congo Belge et du Rwanda-Urundi) in 1959. It became the Faculty of Protestant Theology in Free University of the Congo in 1963 and was later folded into the National University of Zaire (UNAZA) as part of the centralization of secondary education in the country in 1971. It was subsequently re-established an independent body in 1974 when UNAZA was securalised. As of 2015, it was the largest Protestant university in the world, with a student enrollment of approximately 8,000. At that time, 55 percent of the students were female and 45 percent were male.

== Academics ==
As of September 2015, UPC had the following faculties as illustrated in the table below. The year each faculty was established is also shown.

Protestant University in Congo: Faculties
Rank	Faculty	Year of establishment	Notes
1	Faculty of Theology	1959	
2	Faculty of Business Administration and Economics	1989	
3	Faculty of Law	1994	
4	Faculty of Medicine	2006	
5	Faculty of Computer Science	2017	

== Religious diversity ==
The table below illustrates the religious diversity among registered students in the university, as of September 2015.

Religious Diversity Among Registered Students At Protestant University in Congo, September 2015
Rank	Religious Belief	Number of Students	Percentage	Notes
1	Independent Churches	2,959	37.70	
2	Protestants	2,510	31.97	
3	Catholics	2,298	29.27	
4	Jehovah's Witnesses	28	0.35	
5	Kimbanguists	26	0.33	
6	Muslims	19	0.24	
7	Orthodox	3	0.04	
8	Anglicans	2	0.025	
9	Salvationists	2	0.025	
	Total	7,849	100.00	

== Prominent alumni ==
- Ève Bazaiba, Democratic Republic of the Congolese lawyer, politician and human rights activist. Former Senator. Secretary General of the Movement for the Liberation of the Congo (MLC).
- Acacia Bandubola Mbongo, Congolese businesswoman and politician. Current Minister of the Economy in the Cabinet of the Democratic Republic the Congo, since August 2019.
- Gael Bussa, Congolese lawyer, politician and human rights activist. He was elected National Deputy in the constituency of Budjala, in the province of South-Ubangi, in the 2018 Democratic Republic of the Congo general election.

== See also ==
- List of universities in the Democratic Republic of the Congo
- Education in the Democratic Republic of the Congo
