= Alphonse Ilunga =

Congolese politician

Minister of Public Works of the Republic of the Congo
- In office 24 June 1960 – 12 September 1960
- President: Joseph Kasa-Vubu
- Prime Minister: Patrice Lumumba
- In office 9 February 1961 – July 1962
- Prime Minister: Joseph Iléo; Cyrille Adoula

Minister of Art, Culture, and Sports of the Republic of the Congo
- In office 12 September 1960 – 20 September 1960
- Prime Minister: Joseph Iléo

Personal details
- Born: 25 December 1931 (age 94) Tshikapa, Kasai, Belgian Congo

Alphonse Ilunga or Ilunga Dibwe Luakamanyabo (born 25 December 1931) is a Congolese politician.

== Biography ==
Alphonse Ilunga was born on 25 December 1931 in Tshikapa, Kasai, Belgian Congo into the Katawa clan of the Lulua. He later worked as a clerk for the Kasai Brewery. In 1958 he was elected to the Ndesha communal council and then subsequently appointed to the Luluabourg city council. His familial relations to the customary chief Kalamba Mangole contributed to his political success. He participated in the Belgo-Congolese Round Table Conference from January to February 1960 as a delegate for the Parti National du Progrès.

Ilunga served as the first Congolese Minister of Public Works under Prime Minister Patrice Lumumba. Following the dismissal of the Lumumba Government in September, he was made Minister of Art, Culture, and Sports under Joseph Iléo. In February 1961 he returned to his position as Minister of Public Works. Ilunga retained the office under Prime Minister Cyrille Adoula until July 1962 when Adoula reshuffled his government and made him Minister of Communications and Transport. In June 1964 he was elected to the steering committee of the press and propaganda arm of the Rassemblement des démocrates congolaise (RADECO). His service in the government ended on 9 July. In 1965 he was elected to the Senate. Following Joseph-Désiré Mobutu's seizure of power later that year, Ilunga was able to retain government positions due to the influence of Kalamba and his uncle Bakole wa Ilunga, Archbishop of Kananga. He reprised his role as Minister of Public Works on 16 August 1968, serving until 31 July 1969. In 1970 he was elected to the National Assembly.
