= Eteni Longondo =

Congolese doctor and politician

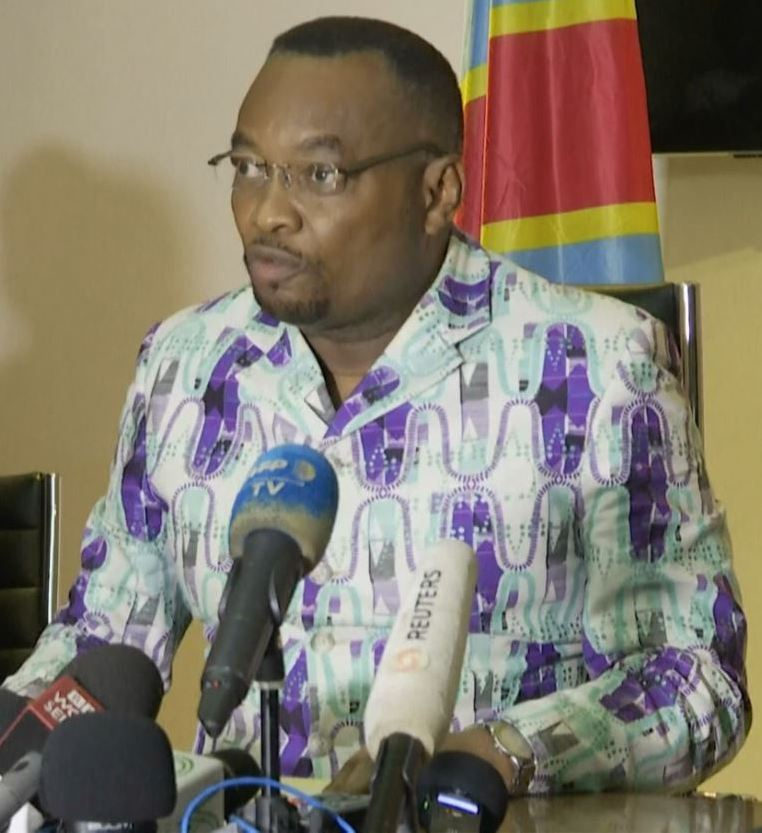
- Minister of Health
- Assumed office September 2019

Eteni Longondo is a Congolese doctor and politician. He is a Member of the UDPS, and was the former Minister of Health in the Sylvestre Ilunga government from September 2019 to August 2021.

== Early life and education ==
Born on January 10, 1965 in Kinshasa, Eteni Longondo studied general medicine at the University of Kinshasa. He became the team physician for the Zaire national football team, then went to Swaziland to become a general practitioner. He then studied public health at University of Washington, and decided to stay in the US to work in the public health department of Seattle.

Longondo also worked in several international organizations during his career, such as World Vision, Mercy Corps, Samaritan's Purse, Save the Children and the United States Agency for International Development (USAID).

== Political career ==
In 2014, Longondo was appointed by Étienne Tshisekedi Deputy Secretary General of the Union for Democracy and Social Progress (UDPS) opposition party.

During the 2018 presidential election, he supported the candidacy of Félix Tshisekedi, who won the election.

=== Minister of Health ===
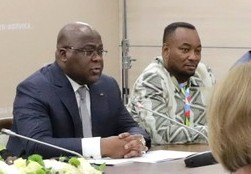
Eteni Longondo (right) alongside the president Félix Tshisekedi in Sochi (Russia) in October 2019

On August 26, 2019, Longondo was appointed Minister of Health within the Ilunga government, and took office on September 9, succeeding the interim minister Pierre Kangudia. When taking up his post, he announced that he wanted to strengthen the health system, solve the problem of the premium for doctors as well as want to put an end to the problem of fictitious workers.

As Minister of Health, he inherited the management of two major health crises: an Ebola epidemic, one of the most serious the country has known, as well as an epidemic of measles.

In October 2019, during a Russia-Africa summit in Sochi, he signed a cooperation agreement in the epidemiological field between the DRC and Russia with Anna Popova.

From March 2020, he manages the health crisis linked to the COVID-19 pandemic. Criticisms concerning the management of the resources allocated to the fight against the epidemic emerged in June 2020. Congolese microbiologist Jean-Jacques Muyembe of the INRB, which is in charge of the response, announced having received barely more than a million dollars, while the government had officially spent more than 27 million to fight against the epidemic. In a press release published on June 21, Eteni Longondo made public a report on the management of these funds by his ministry. The minister explained this delay by erroneous lists, which would have been inflated with the names of agents not participating in the response.

=== Accusations of embezzlement ===
In July 2020, Longondo was accused of embezzlement. On July 3, the deputy PPRD François Nzekuye denounced, in a written question, the “catastrophic management” of the ministry, and accused Longondo of having set up a system of kickbacks. He also suspected him of having circulated expired drugs. Eteni Longondo promised to explain himself to the deputies if he is officially seized.

On July 7, a confidential report to the Prime Minister leaked on social networks, in which he was questioned by his vice-minister Albert M'Peti Biyombo (member of the FCC, pro-Kabila coalition). The latter denounced "mafia networks" within his ministry, which would have misappropriated the funds allocated to the fight against COVID-19, and accused the minister and other members of the government of bribery when awarding contracts. Jules Alingete Key, Inspector General of Finance, then launched an audit at the ministry. In response to these accusations, Eteni Longondo announced an intention to file a complaint against X for defamation. Doctors subsequently demonstrated to demand the resignation of the minister, accusing him of "embezzlement"

On August 27, 2021, Eteni Longondo was placed under a provisional arrest warrant, following a hearing at the public prosecutor's office at the Court of Cassation in Kinshasa.

On August 31, 2021, Eteni Longondo was released on bail during a hearing before the council chamber of the Kinshasa Gombe tribunal de grande instance. This was granted to him after a two-week deliberation.

=== Acquittal of accusations of embezzlement ===
On June 7, 2023, Longondo was acquitted by the Court of Cassation. It was concluded by them that there was no incriminating evidence of the COVID funds fraud.

=== Parliament Member for Ikela ===
In December 2023, as a part of the UDPS political party, he was elected as the deputy of the Ikela Territory in the Tshuapa province.

In 2024, he opposed the leadership of Augustin Kabuya, Secretary General at the head of the UDPS, whom he accused of mismanagement, thus creating conflict within the presidential party. He wrote public a letter to the party in June of that year to request a reorganization of the party. On July 8, 2024, he organized a press conference where he called for the convening of congress and the suspension of the party's activities. He was supported in this initiative by around thirty national secretaries, who wrote a joint press release on July 11, demanding the dismissal of the Secretary General. Augustin Kabuya, criticized Eteni Longondo's initiative during various meetings, believing that the critique would be used by enemies of the President in order to intentionally sow chaos in his party.
