= Luc Nkulula =

Congolese political activist

- Born: October 18, 1985; Lubumbashi, Zaire
- Died: June 10, 2018; Goma, Democratic Republic of the Congo
- Occupation(s): Lawyer, political activist

Luc Nkulula (October 18, 1985 - June 10, 2018) was a Congolese political activist and leader of the pro-democracy movement lutte pour le changement (LUCHA).

== Biography ==
Nkulula was born in Lubumbashi, a city in southern Congo, and grew up between there and Goma in the east of the country. He obtained a law degree from the University of Goma, after which he worked as a consultant for various international organizations.

Nkulula joined LUCHA, a Congolese pro-democracy movement, upon its creation in 2012 and became one of its leading members. He represented the movement at a meeting with President Joseph Kabila in 2016, where he criticized the president for his lack of action for the violence-plagued east of the country and urged him to relinquish power peacefully. Nkulula's activism involved encouraging young people in his country to be involved in public affairs. From his leading role in a campaign to improve access to safe drinking water in Goma, he was often known by the nickname "H2O".

Nkulula died on the night of June 9–10, 2018 as his house burnt down. The death was deemed "suspicious" by other LUCHA members, even though "an investigation blamed a faulty solar panel". He was eulogized by The Economist as "one of Congo’s bravest campaigners for democracy and free elections."
