= Néné Nkulu Ilunga =

Congolese politician

- Born: Democratic Republic of the Congo
- Occupation: Politician

Néné Nkulu Ilunga is a Congolese politician. She is the Minister of State, Minister of Employment, Labour and Social Welfare in the Ilunga Government since September 2019. She is the Deputy Secretary-General of the Alliance of Democratic Forces of the Congo (AFDC) political party, led by Modeste Bahat. She is a member of Union for Democracy and Social Progress.

Ilunga was elected as the Member of Parliament for Malemba-Nkulu in 2011, and re-elected in 2018. After serving as a special commissioner, she also served as the deputy governor of Upper Lomami after the first gubernatorial elections in that area.
