= Direction Générale de Migration =

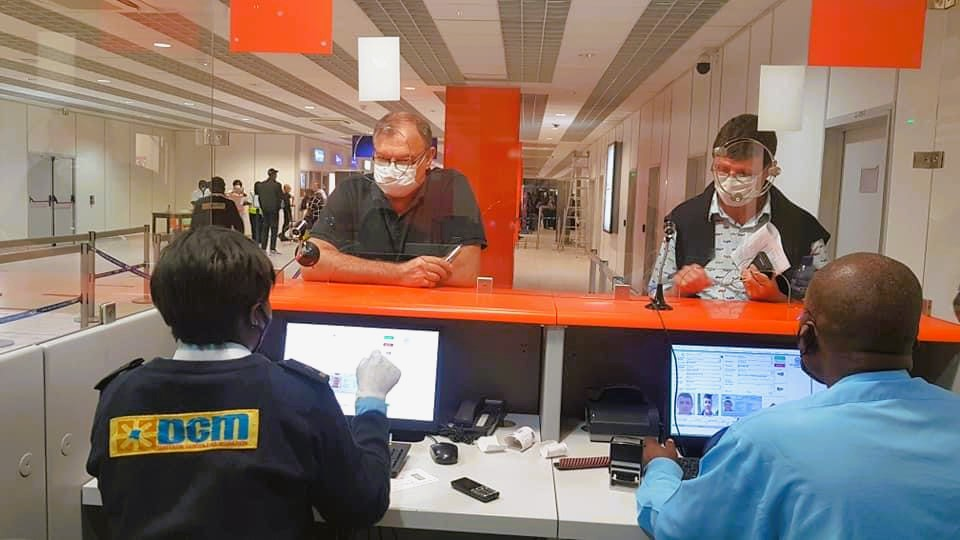
- Direction Générale de Migration, June 2020

Agency overview
- Formed: 11 January 2003; 23 years ago

Jurisdictional structure
- Operations jurisdiction: Democratic Republic of the Congo
- Legal jurisdiction: Ministry of the Interior and Security

Operational structure
- Headquarters: Gombe, Kinshasa

The Direction Générale de Migration (meaning General Directorate of Migration), abbreviated as DGM, is an agency under the Ministry of the Interior, Security, Decentralization, and Customary Affairs of the Democratic Republic of the Congo. The DGM'S headquarters is situated in Gombe, Kinshasa. Established by Decree-Law No. 002/2003 of 11 January 2003, it is tasked with enforcing immigration and emigration laws, managing border and foreigner control, issuing ordinary passports to nationals and visas to foreign nationals, and cooperating with INTERPOL in identifying suspects and criminals. Its jurisdiction spans the entire national territory and extends to Congolese diplomatic missions abroad.

Structurally, the DGM is headed by a Director General, assisted by a Deputy Director General. It comprises central directorates, provincial directorates across each province, and offices attached to embassies and consulates. Its central services include departments such as Border Police, Foreigners Police, Chancellery, Human Resources and Training, Finance, Logistics, and IT and Documentation.

== History ==
The Direction Générale de Migration (DGM) was officially established by Decree-Law No. 002/2003, signed by President Joseph Kabila on 11 January 2003. This decree created the DGM as a public service with both administrative and financial autonomy, addressing the urgent need for an effective and centralized migration service in the Democratic Republic of the Congo. Before the DGM's creation, migration affairs were managed by the Agence Nationale d'Immigration (ANI), which was created under Ordinance No. 87-003 on 7 January 1987, and further organized by Ordinance No. 87-054 on 9 February 1987. These ordinances were formally revoked by the 2003 Decree-Law, marking a significant legal and institutional shift toward a more effective framework for managing immigration and emigration.

Since its inception, the DGM has operated with four divisions, including the Border and Foreign Policy Division, collectively referred to as "DPEF." However, a notable restructuring took place on 24 January 2003, as noted in No. 06/DP/00/DGM/BC/044/2003, which resulted in two separate entities: The Aliens Police Division (Division de la Police des Étrangers; DPE) and the Border Police Division (Division de la Police des Frontières; DPF). The specific responsibilities of the DPE are pending clarification. These responsibilities are expected to be defined through the implementation measures associated with Decree-Law No. 002/2003 of 11 January 2003, which pertains to the establishment and organization of the DGM.

== Administrative status ==
The DGM is governed by Law No. 81-003 of 17 July 1981, which outlines the regulations pertaining to career staff within state public services. However, due to the unique nature of the services provided by the DGM and its distinct mission, the President of the Republic holds the authority to issue administrative regulations through a decree. These administrative regulations are designed to address specific aspects, including social benefits, disciplinary procedures, mechanisms for appeal, conditions for retirement eligibility, and associated advantages for the staff of the DGM. This approach recognizes the need for tailored guidelines that account for the specialized role and responsibilities of the agency, ensuring that its employees receive appropriate support and oversight.

Parenthetically, the administrative reforms encompass the repeal and final provisions of prior ordinances, such as Ordinance No. 87-003 of 7 January 1987, and Ordinance No. 87-054 of 9 February 1987, which outlined the organization and functioning of the ANI. These ordinances, along with any earlier provisions conflicting with the newly enacted decree-law, are also invalidated.

== Organization ==
The DGM is made up of various organizational components:

=== Provincial direction ===
The Provincial Directorates are established in the capitals of each Province. They assume responsibilities within their respective jurisdictions that are not delegated to the central directorates. This decentralized approach facilitates efficient administration and decision-making at the provincial level.

=== Foreign Police ===
The Foreign Police is responsible for overseeing the presence and activities of foreign nationals within the national territories. It manages matters related to the stay of foreigners, ensuring compliance with regulations and requirements.

=== Border Police ===
The Border Police Division is tasked with regulating the movement of foreigners entering and exiting Congolese territory, this division plays a crucial role in maintaining border security and controlling the flow of individuals across national borders.

=== Finance ===
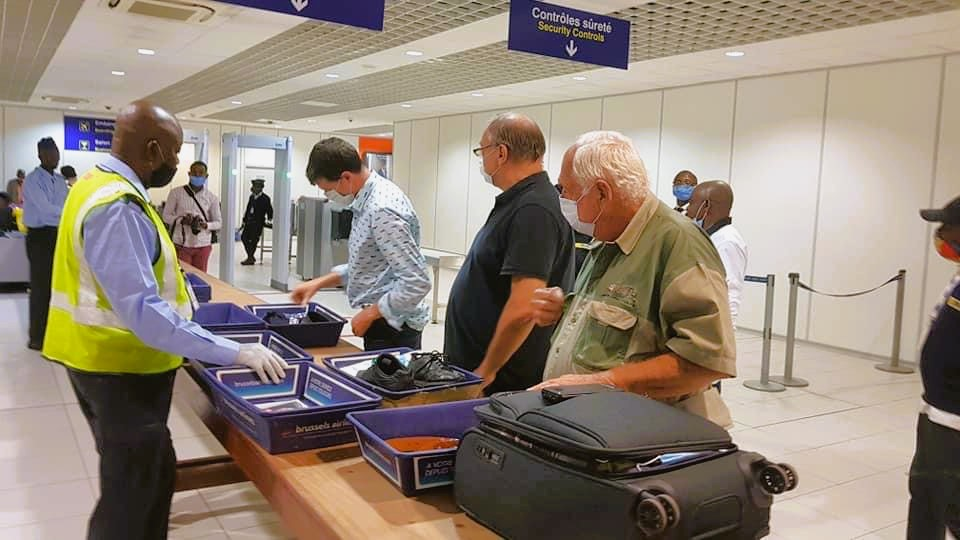
DGM official observing Régie des Voies Aériennes security at N'Djili International Airport, June 2020

The finance handles financial matters and is responsible for maintaining accurate accounting records. The division comprises an accountant, a cashier, and an auditor, collectively managing financial transactions and ensuring transparency in financial operations.

=== Human resources and training ===
The Human Resources and Training is dedicated to the management of personnel and their training within the organization's new structures. It ensures that staff are effectively managed, trained, and aligned with the evolving needs of the agency.

=== Document and information study ===
The Document and Information Study is tasked with analyzing and processing documents held by foreigners. It examines various documents and maintains related records, contributing to the organization's data management and documentation efforts.
