= Ministry of Infrastructure and Public Works =

Government ministry of the Democratic Republic of the Congo

- Ministère des Infrastructures et Travaux Publics

Agency overview
- Formed: At independence in 1960 as the Ministry of Public Works
- Jurisdiction: Government of the Democratic Republic of the Congo
- Headquarters: Gombe, Kinshasa, Democratic Republic of the Congo
- Minister responsible: John Banza Lunda, Minister of Infrastructure and Public Works
- Website: infrastructures.gouv.cd

The Ministry of Infrastructure and Public Works (French: Ministère des Infrastructures et Travaux Publics, often abbreviated MITP) is a government ministry of the Democratic Republic of the Congo responsible for public infrastructure, including roads, ports, airports, railways, and hydroelectric facilities, as well as the construction and maintenance of schools, healthcare facilities, and government buildings. Its headquarters are on Roi Baudouin Avenue in Gombe, Kinshasa.

The ministry oversees publicly and internationally funded infrastructure projects, manages construction contracts, promotes technical standards, and regulates contractors and consultants. It also manages public assets, including government vehicles, fuel reserves, and state-owned property. John Banza Lunda has served as minister since August 2025.

== Responsibilities ==
- Design, construction, modernization, development, planning, and maintenance of road, port, airport, railway, non-concessioned hydroelectric, educational, health, social, tourism, and sports infrastructure, as well as public buildings and facilities, in collaboration, where necessary, with the sectoral ministries concerned with infrastructure projects;
- Design, construction, development, and maintenance of national drainage, sanitation, and anti-erosion works;
- Preparation, awarding, monitoring, and supervision of public procurement contracts related to civil engineering studies and works financed by the Government and external partners, in collaboration with the ministries responsible for finance, budget, and planning;
- Technical and financial monitoring and control of studies and works carried out either by public administration or by private contractors;
- Expert assessment and counter-expertise concerning studies related to public works and state movable property;
- Promotion of construction materials and techniques;
- Registration and accreditation of companies, consulting firms, and independent professionals operating in the construction sector;
- Inventory, analysis, and interpretation of data related to infrastructure and equipment;
- Development of construction standards;
- Monitoring compliance with legal, regulatory, and technical standards related to construction;
- Formulation of reconstruction policy in collaboration with the relevant ministries;
- Management of the State vehicle fleet;
- Management of State fuel stocks and monitoring of fuel consumption;
- Management of real estate assets within the state's public domain, as well as all related equipment.

== History ==
Since the Democratic Republic of the Congo gained independence, every government has kept a ministry in charge of infrastructure, which was first called the Ministry of Public Works. During the First Republic, it operated as the Ministry of Public Works before being renamed the Ministry of Public Works, Communications and Transport between 1964 and 1965, after which it reverted to its former title of Ministry of Public Works, Territorial Planning and Urban Development from 1965 to 1997 during the Second Republic, and later the Ministry of Emergency Works, a title it retained until January 2001.

Between 2001 and 2005, it again took the name Ministry of Public Works while also assuming responsibilities related to territorial administration and development. In 2005, it became the Ministry of Infrastructure, Public Works and Reconstruction as part of the "Five Projects of the Republic" infrastructure modernization initiative, with additional responsibilities for territorial planning, urban planning, and housing.

On 27 March 2020, a presidential ordinance restored the name Ministry of Infrastructure and Public Works.

== Ministers ==
Minister	Portfolio	Assumed office	Left office
Alphonse Ilunga	Infrastructure and Public Works	30 June 1960	12 September 1960
Joseph Masanga	Infrastructure and Public Works	19 September 1960	9 February 1961
Alphonse Ilunga	Infrastructure and Public Works	9 February 1961	11 July 1962
Albert Delvaux	Public Works	11 July 1962	18 April 1963
Jules Léon Kodicho	Transport, Communications and Public Works	10 July 1964	18 October 1965
Albert Delvaux	Public Works	18 October 1965	28 November 1965
Jean Bolikango	Public Works	28 November 1965	25 October 1966
Alphonse Ilunga	Public Works	16 August 1968	31 July 1969
Alexis Tambwe Mwamba	Public Works	6 June 1994	2 April 1997
Agnes Loteta Dimandja	Public Works, Territorial Planning and Urban Development	11 April 1997	20 May 1997
Étienne Mbaya	Emergency Works	20 May 1997	16 July 1997
Gustave Bishikuabo Kubaka	Public Works	July 1997	July 1998
Anatole Tshumbala Bishikwabo	Public Works, Territorial Administration and Development	July 1998	March 1999
Jean Yagi Sitolo	Public Works	March 1999	Unknown
José Endundo Bonange	Public Works	Unknown	30 June 2003
José Makila Sumanda	Public Works	30 June 2003	17 February 2005
Pierre Lumbi Okongo	Infrastructure, Public Works and Reconstruction	17 February 2005	19 February 2010
Fridolin Kasweshi Misoka	Territorial Planning, Urban Planning and Housing	19 February 2010	14 November 2016
Thomas Luhaka	Infrastructure, Public Works and Reconstruction	19 December 2016	6 September 2019
Willy Ngoopos Sunzhel	Infrastructure, Public Works and Reconstruction	6 September 2019	26 April 2021
Alexis Gisaro Muvunyi	Infrastructure and Public Works	26 April 2021	12 August 2025
John Banza Lunda	Infrastructure and Public Works	12 August 2025	Incumbent
