= Albert Delvaux =

Congolese politician

Albert Delvaux Mafuta Kizola
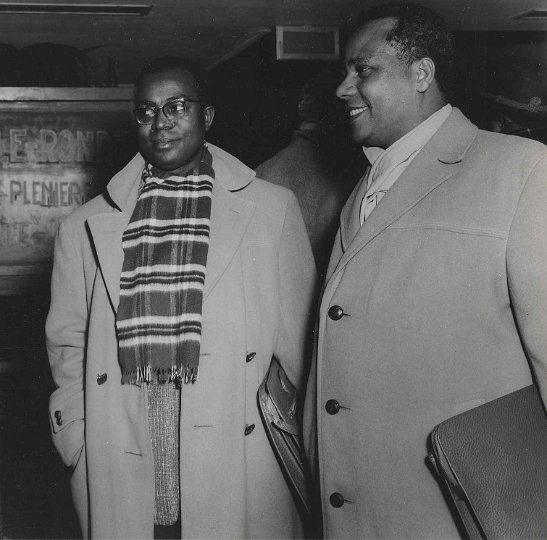
- Delvaux (right) with Pierre Mombele at the Belgo-Congolese Round Table Conference

Resident Minister in Belgium of the Republic of the Congo, Charged with Belgo-Congolese Relations
- In office 21 June 1960 – 14 September 1960
- President: Joseph Kasa-Vubu
- Prime Minister: Patrice Lumumba

Personal details
- Born: Albert Delvaux; 8 May 1918
- Died: 1985
- Party: Parti National du Progrès; Union kwangolaise pour l'indépendance et la liberté (LUKA)

Albert Delvaux Mafuta Kizola (8 May 1918 – 1985) was a Congolese politician who served as Resident Minister of the Republic of the Congo in Belgium.

== Before Congolese independence ==
Albert Delvaux was born on 8 May 1918 to a Belgian father and a Muyaka mother. In 1959, he became the Secretary General of the weakly organised Parti National du Progrès (PNP), a party closely aligned with the Belgian colonisers. He participated in the Belgo-Congolese Round Table Conference in January-February 1960 in Brussels as a representative of this party. Every Congolese delegation had a Belgian adviser or Belgian advisers at its disposal. In the case of PNP, this included later Minister of Foreign Affairs Henri Simonet.

== After Congolese independence ==
Delvaux occupied the position of Resident Minister of Congo in Belgium in the ephemeral Lumumba Government, the first government of the Congo, which gained its independence from Belgium on 30 June 1960. On 5 September 1960, however, President Joseph Kasa-Vubu dismissed the Lumumba government. According to the Loi fondamentale (Fundamental Law) and based on Belgian constitutional practice, every decision by the President has to be countersigned by a minister. Together with Minister of Foreign Affairs Justin Bomboko, Delvaux signed the presidential ordinance dismissing the Lumumba government.

With the installment of the new government of Joseph Iléo, Delvaux became the Minister of Work. Later, in the government of Cyrille Adoula, Delvaux was the Minister of Public Works.

After the second coup d'état of Joseph-Désiré Mobutu in 1965, Delvaux held several offices like a People's Commissioner (Member of Parliament) from 1977, and member of the Political Bureau of the state party Mouvement Populaire de la Révolution, where he was the dean of the Bureau. His mandate at the Political Bureau ended on 18 February 1981.

Through the renaming campaign in the framework of Authenticité, Albert Delvaux changed his name to Mafuta Kizola.

== Family ==
Delvaux was the father of seven girls and three boys, including Hector Delvaux Mafuta (16 February 1956 – 9 April 2014), pilot of the Congolese presidency.

== Honours ==
- Zaire: National Order of the Leopard (1969: Commander; 1980: Grand Officer)

== Legacy ==
The community Binza Delvaux in the Ngaliema commune of Congo's capital Kinshasa is named after Delvaux.
