= Gael Bussa =

Congolese politician

Gael Bussa Obambule
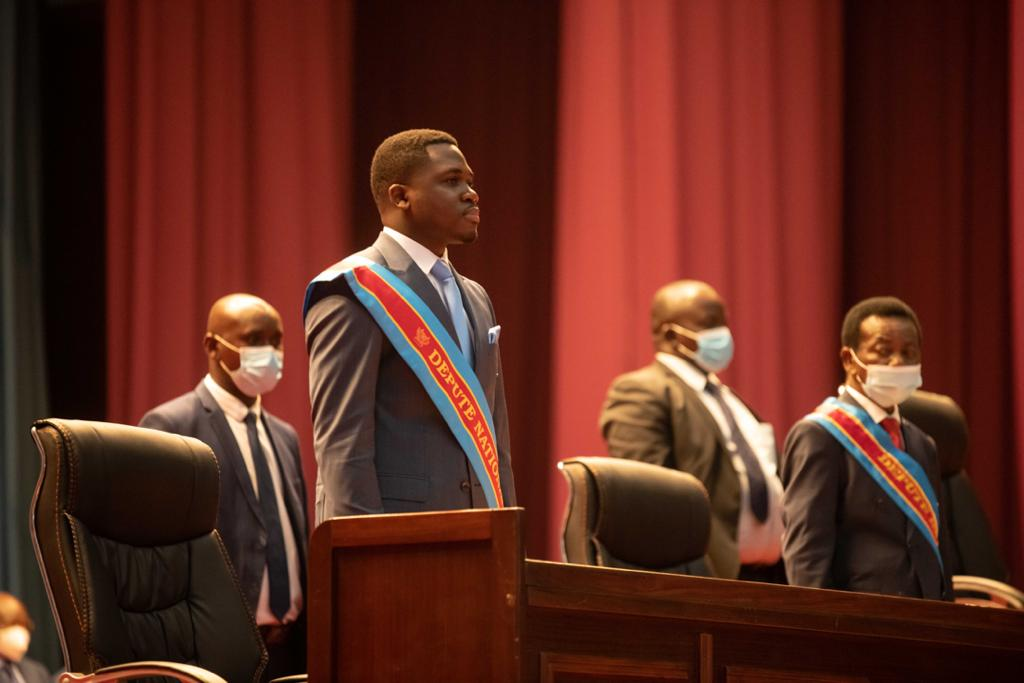
- Honorable Gael Bussa Obambule in the National Assembly (Democratic Republic of the Congo)

Member of the Democratic Republic of the Congo Parliament
- Incumbent
- Assumed office December 30, 2018
- President: Christophe Mboso N'Kodia Pwanga (National Assembly)
- Prime Minister: Jean-Michel Sama Lukonde

Personal details
- Born: August 2, 1993 (age 33) Kinshasa, Zaire (now DRC)
- Party: Renovating Democrats Movement
- Parent: Jean-Lucien Bussa Tongba (father)
- Education: Protestant University in the Congo
- Occupation: Politician, lawyer

Gael Bussa Obambule (born August 2, 1993, in Kinshasa) is a Congolese lawyer and politician. He was elected National Deputy in the constituency of Budjala, in the province of South-Ubangi, in the 2018 Democratic Republic of the Congo general election.

== Biography ==
Gael Bussa was born on August 2, 1993, in Kinshasa in the Democratic Republic of Congo, at the time the Republic of Zaire. He is the son of Jean-Lucien Bussa Tongba, the current Congolese Minister of Foreign Trade, and Petronelle Mambetuku Kimpioka. He studied for a degree in public Law and graduated in public International Law from the Protestant University in the Congo in 2018.

== Career ==
In 2015, while still a student and passionate about entrepreneurship, he created a small and medium-sized business Racof and, later in March 2016, a non-profit association called Ya Ba Jeunes with the aim of contributing to the emergence, awakening and awareness of Congolese youth.

On January 19, 2015, he mobilized in Kinshasa students outside the Protestant University in the Congo and in Bandalungwa to protest against the draft electoral law which would require a population census before the presidential election to delay the date of the elections and lengthening the term of President Joseph Kabila.

Gael Bussa takes part in several Meetings and political demonstrations alongside the political parties of the dynamic of the opposition which demand the organization of the elections within the Constitutional deadline, as well as the enrollment of new adults by the Independent National Electoral Commission.

In December 2018, Gael Bussa was elected National Member of Parliament in the 2018 Democratic Republic of the Congo general elections.

== Philanthropy ==
Gael Bussa carries out several actions in favor of vulnerable and destitute people. He supports the free Education program in the Democratic Republic of the Congo, anxious to give children a good education through better study conditions, and in 2019 rehabilitates a primary school in Lukunga (Kinshasa district).

== Personal life ==
Gael Bussa is married to Alicia Salawa, a Congolese lawyer.

== See also ==
- Parliament of the Democratic Republic of the Congo
- Aminata Namasia
