= Valérie Mukasa Muanabute =

Congolese politician

- Born: Democratic Republic of the Congo
- Occupation: Politician

Valérie Mukasa Muanabute is a Congolese politician. In 2019, Muanabute was appointed as the Deputy Minister of International and Regional Cooperation of Democratic Republic of the Congo, under Ilunga government that ran from September 2019 to April 2021, as well as a member of parliament.
