= André Lite =

Congolese politician

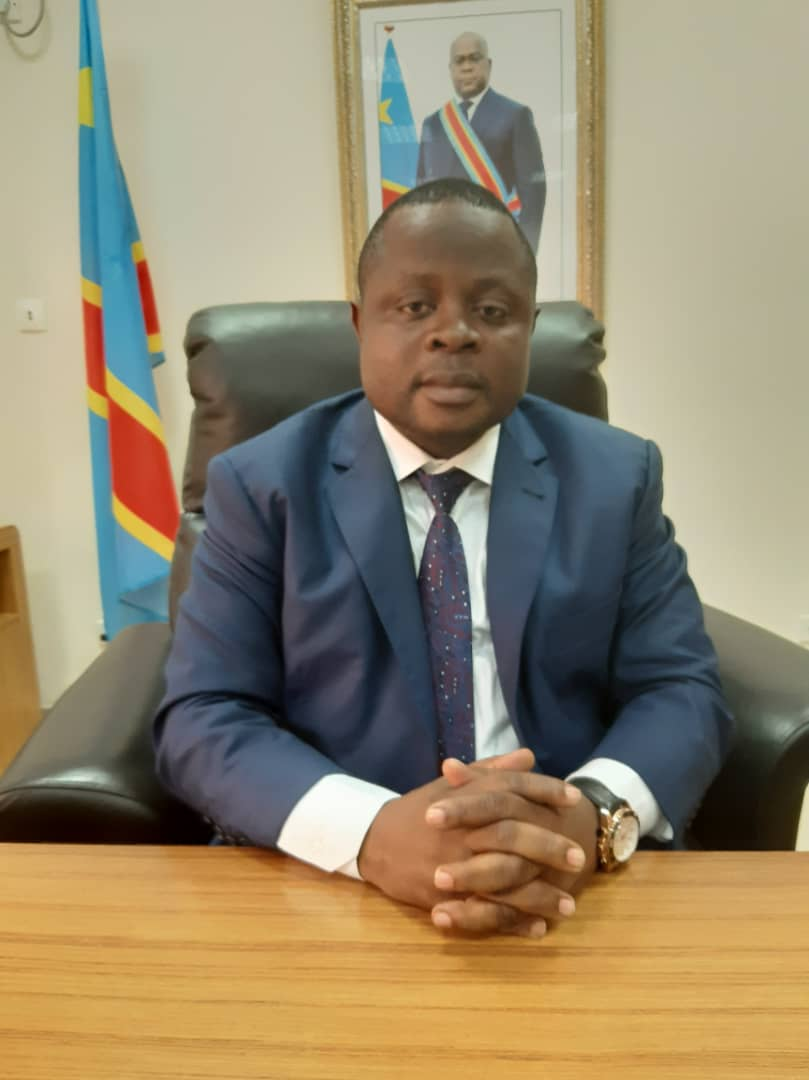
- Born: 3 May 1979 (age 47); Wamba, Democratic Republic of the Congo
- Occupation: Politician

André Lite (born 3 May 1979) is a Congolese politician. He was the Minister of Human Rights of Democratic Republic of the Congo, under Ilunga government that ran from September 2019 to April 2021, as well as a member of parliament. He is the leader of the political group Christian Alternative for the Congo (Alternative chrétienne pour le Congo, A1) and the political party Christian Democrats for the Congo (Démocrates chrétiens pour le Congo, DCC). He claims that he has received from God the mission to contribute to the restoration of Congo's greatness for the glory of God, which he claims the DRC's take-off depends on.
