= Aggeé Aje Matembo =

Congolese politician

- Born: Democratic Republic of the Congo
- Occupation: Politician

Aggeé Aje Matembo is a Congolese politician. In 2019, he was appointed as the Minister of Land Development of Democratic Republic of the Congo, under Ilunga government that ran from September 2019 to April 2021, as well as a member of parliament. He is a member of Union for Democracy and Social Progress.
