= Lutte pour le changement =

Civil rights organization in Democratic Republic of Congo

- Part of The response to impact of the Arab Spring, the Senegal movement "Y´en a marre" and the Burkina Faso population rise against President Blaise Compaoré
- Date: 2011 – present

Lutte Pour Le Changement (LUCHA [lut͜ʃa]) is a group based in Goma in eastern Democratic Republic of Congo who fights for a class of rights that protect Congoleses' freedom from infringement by governments, social organizations, and private individuals. They ensure one's ability to participate in the civil and political life of the Congolese society and state without discrimination or repression.

The group is a youth-led, nonviolent citizen movement that emerged in 2012 in Goma and soon expanded across North Kivu and into rural areas. Its main goal is to provide an alternative to the armed groups, political parties and NGOs in the DRC that have long dominated the eastern political space. LUCHA frames itself as engaging in a triple critique against the government, civil society and the international community at large. Yet, unlike the armed groups in the area, it does not seek to replace the state, but rather to hold it accountable. Formed amid widespread frustration with corruption, insecurity and delayed elections under President Joseph Kabila, the movement became a prominent voice in nationwide calls for democratic accountability and political reform.

The movement is known for its horizontal organizational model and its guiding philosophy, Luchologie, which emphasizes ethical activism, collective leadership and independence from state institutions and foreign donors. Its campaigns have addressed issues such as access to basic services, arbitrary detention, electoral manipulation and local governance and LUCHA played a visible role in the protests that pressured Kabila´s government to hold long-delayed national elections.

Despite its commitment to nonviolence, LUCHA activists have faced sustained repression including arrests, intimidation, surveillance and internet shutdowns. Human rights organizations have reported that authorities tried to treat the movement as a crime and limit public freedoms by restricting civic space, particularly during the state of siege declared in North Kivu and Ituri in 2021.

Beyond political mobilization, LUCHA has also strongly influenced youth culture in Eastern Congo, inspiring a wave of artistic activism known as "Artivisme". This form of art uses slam poetry, music and visual arts to promote civic engagement and critique governance. The movement is also recognized as a grassroots actor in transitional justice efforts, contributing to local accountability initiatives and advancing guarantees of non-recurrence in conflict-affected communities.

== Background ==
This group was born out of frustration with the current political process and diminished social condition in the Democratic Republic of Congo by a group of young Congolese students. These students understood that violence is not the way for anyone willing to find durable solutions to political and social disputes and wars that have torn their country apart for the past half century.

The one thing that defines the Lutte Pour Le Changement activists is their love for their native DR Congo and the hope to see it prosperous and developed in their lifetime. They have decided to organize a series of non-violent actions throughout major cities in the country to shed light to some of the critical issues facing the Congolese population. Their actions are not limited to keeping politicians honest, but rather engaging the population into participating in the social issues debates. The movement started in the eastern city of Goma in the Democratic Republic of Congo in mid-June 2011 and in no time, the movement had spread all the way to the west of the country, with famous members such as Fred Bauma and Yves Makwambala being incarcerated since March 2015 at the Congolese National Intelligence Agency headquarters in Kinshasa. On March 15, 2015, according to the online news media Pragmora, "About 30 youth activists and international journalists and observers were arrested in Kinshasa during a youth workshop aimed at increasing youth participation in politics and the electoral process, and creating a new youth movement, Filimbi". In the recent uprising, many of the LUCHA activists arrested during Dec 19, 2016 have been released, including the 23 year old Gloria Sengha Panda Shala according to Ida Sawyer a Human Rights Watch Director in Central Africa.

The first LUCHA protest to receive widespread attention was the effort to get the young people to get involved in the 2011 presidential and legislatives elections by ensure that all eligible to vote got registered ahead of the upcoming the elections. Then followed a few actions in regards to lack of clean water in Goma and also issue with garbage waste in the same city. This movement got the eye of the Congolese people because this group managed first and foremost to get the general population to have a say in these critical matters facing their livelihood through the streets of various Congolese cities namely Kinshasa, Mbuji-Mayi, Lubumbashi, Kisangani and Goma.

== Origins, context and political emergence ==
LUCHA was founded by university students in North Kivu protesting chronic poor governance, a lack of basic public services and ongoing insecurity. LUCHA´s name, Lutte pour le Changement (struggle for change) draws inspiration from the Spanish term la lucha. LUCHA positions itself as a non-violent, youth-led movement committed to building a new Congo that is independent, united, peaceful and democratic. LUCHA deliberately situates itself in the tradition of Patrice Lumumba, invoking him in its manifesto and in members´ speeches. Lumumba functions as a central moral and historical reference for LUCHA and is portrayed as a Christ-like figure in Congolese political culture. LUCHA activists explicitly mobilize and claim his legacy in their works viewing him as their historical martyr.

While LUCHA was born in the urban center of Goma, it quickly spread to remote towns and rural villages in North Kivu making it a national movement rather than an urban one which scholars describe as rare in African protest politics. As traditional chiefs lost influence due to large land and resource deals controlled by the state and outside actors, rural youth became less dependent on customary authority and more open to new forms of political organizing, including LUCHA. This reflected a shift toward nonviolent rural protest by mobilizing rural citizens through peaceful action rather than armed struggle. New rural economies also changed youth life with more people now working for wage jobs rather than solely being subsistence farmers. Especially in North Kivu, there was an expansion of artisanal and corporate mining jobs which increased mobility among the rural youth. This allowed them to move frequently between villages, mining sites, towns and Goma, which helped spread LUCHA´s message more easily.

The movement came about during the presidency of Joseph Kabila, at a time when the DRC faced deep political frustration. Kabila had been in power since 2001 and by 2012 and many Congolese believed his government was marked by corruption, weak institutions and repeated delays in democratic elections. According to political scientist Marta Iñiguez de Heredia, Kabila became widely criticized for ruling in an authoritarian and repressive way, allowing major human rights abuses to occur such as the killing of activist Floribert Chebeya. At this time, socioeconomic conditions deteriorated with over 90% of Congolese living on less than $3.10 a day. There were massacres and serious violence in places like Beni, Ituri and Kasai. Additionally, around 4.5 million people were forced to leave their homes.

In this climate of frustration and stagnation, new citizen movements began to emerge, with scholars claiming that LUCHA quickly became one of the most influential in challenging his prolonged rule. A long tradition of civil society in Congo of churches, unions, local associations and women's groups helped new groups to emerge. These movements greatly contributed to President Kabila´s decision to step down in December 30, 2018. He finally agreed to leave after being in power for almost 20 years and staying 2 extra years past his term limit. This date marked the second peaceful transfer of power in the nation´s history. After Kabila´s exit, Félix Tshisekedi took office in January 2019 following the elections. LUCHA argued that the political transition was incomplete and that meaningful democratic change required ongoing citizen mobilization, accountability and resistance to authoritarian tendencies. Many people argued that Martin Fayulu won more votes but a secret deal between Tshisekedi and Kabila was made to keep Kabila on power behind the scenes. Kabila´s party won about 70% of parliament seats showing how he kept major control.

The limits of the transition became visible after May 2021 when President Tshisekedi declared a state of siege in North Kivu and Ituri. This created an emergency regime that replaced all civilian authorities with military and police officials and transferred criminal jurisdiction to military courts. This state of siege reversed the core democratic gains that citizens expected after Kabila's departure. During this state, there was widespread violent repression of LUCHA activists revealing how dissent continued to be treated as a security threat and reflecting patterns associated with earlier authoritarian rule. Amnesty International´s Research shows that the state of siege did not have any immediate effect in improving security in the DRC but instead led to serious human rights violations, including restrictions on freedom of expression, peaceful assembly and access to justice. During this time, LUCHA´s peaceful protests and ciriticism of the state of siege were framed as security threats. LUCHA members were blamed for supporting and collaborating with armed groups, especially the ADF (Allied Democratic Forces), simply for organizing protests. The major of Butembo in North Kivu blamed the group for inciting civil disobedience by calling for strikes such as ville morte (dead city) and for disobeying the law. Ville morte was a common form of peaceful protest in which business closed along with daily activities to show public opposition. LUCHA called for this shutdown in response to the persisting killings in Beni. On 17 August, local traders that responded to LUCHA´s calls by closing their shops were summoned by the police on accusations of civil rebellion. Due to people´s outrage of this event, the major eventually cancelled police orders and had the officer involved arrested.

== Ideology and organizational structure ==
LUCHA developed a clear ideological framework called "Luchologie" which functions as both an identity and an operating manual of the movement. Luchologie is LUCHA´s ethical and organizational philosophy. It defines what it means to be a LUCHA activist and explains how activists must behave, organize, and act. The core elements of this term are horizontal governance, no hierarchy and collective decision-making. Scholars note that Luchologie functions almost like a civil religion because it incorporates initiation rituals, symbolic objects and collective declarations that reinforce moral unity and shared purpose within the movement. Luchologie guides how activists interpret problems, choose campaigns and adapt their actions, following the logic that one of LUCHA´s members noted: "if the problems are there, we are there; when the problems disappear, the movement disappears." This is because LUCHA is issue-driven instead of power-driven. The movement states that it solely exists as long as injustice and corruption continues.

LUCHA has a horizontal, anti-hierarchical structure in which activists reject classic party-style leadership. Founders rotate out of leadership and there is no clear divide between leaders and followers. The movement has no legal restriction and no foreign funding as it refuses to formally register itself as an NGO and avoids donor money to remain independent of external agendas. It relies on non violence and direct action as core pillars, creating peaceful marches, sit-ins, popular education, creative public actions and local mutual aid. LUCHA has also positioned itself in sharp contrast to MONUSCO and other international actors. For LUCHA activists, international actors are not driven by moral concerns but rather by instrumental ones that do very little to improve the region´s conditions. The movement has organized protests in cities such as Beni and Goma calling for the withdrawal of UN peacekeepers and for the Congolese state to take responsibility for national security.

LUCHA´s horizontal leadership model reflects its commitment to transforming political outcomes and the nature of political organization in the DRC. The leaderless style of this model ensures that ideas and campaigns, not individual personalities, guide the movement. The movement is organized through flexible cells rather than rigid hierarchies, allowing activists to move between functions such as action, political education, communication and documentation. Among those interviewed in the Development Research Program research study, there were three different types of LUCHA members identified: organisers, mobilisers and supporters. Organizers handle strategy, mobilisers connect the movement to communities and supporters amplify messages and join protests, reflecting LUCHA´s belief that everyone is a leader in their own space and leaders complete each other.

Horizontal structure, while enabling broader inclusion, also opens space for internal tensions. Two internal tendencies or groups exist within LUCHA: the ones who distrust the state and international NGOs and the ones that support engagement with officials and international actors to gain influence and resources. While LUCHA began as a middle-class, urban student movement, it gradually expanded to include poorer youth whose priorities centered on immediate needs of public services. According to the DLP, this created a class tension with higher class activists that focused on long-term democratic reforms. The DLP study shows how there are four factors that strengthen and limit LUCHA at the same time (1) state repression builds public sympathy but endangers activists, (2) nonviolence gives moral authority but little protection, (3) mobile technology enables coordination but increases surveillance risks such as monitoring, internet shutdowns and government disinformation and (4) LUCHA’s informal, inclusive model keeps it flexible yet fuels mistrust and internal divides between internal groups within the movement.

== Goals ==
The group is determined to ensure there is better governance, respect for human rights and improved and much stronger democracy in the country that faced 32 years of President Mobutu Dictatorship. These inspired Congolese youths driven by social injustice and non democratic political process believe that their movement can bring about positive change in the DR Congo, as well as Africa as a whole.

These young men have lived in a region where there is constant armed conflict throughout their teenage and adult lives. When they started this movement, they decided to use non-violent actions to raise awareness about social and political issues in the DRC. Since then, many of these youths have been detained without charge during peaceful protests or gatherings. Several members were held by the Congolese national intelligence agency and have reported experiencing moral and physical abuse while in custody.

== Slogan ==
We are leaders. Not hostages of the past. Nor slaves of the present. Nor beggars of our future!

It also reads on their official site:

WE ARE NOT VIOLENT

WE RISK TOGETHER

WE ASSUME OUR ACTS

== Contribution to Transitional Justice ==
Transitional Justice is a framework governments and societies use after conflict or dictatorship to address past human rights abuses while moving toward peace and democracy. Scholars argue that youth are often portrayed as either victims or perpetrators of human rights violations which hides their positive, proactive roles. Ignoring their participation limits the effectiveness of transitional justice, especially the pillar of Guarantees of Non-Recurrence (GoNR). This pillar focuses in changing systems through police reforms, human rights education and stronger democratic institutions. Scholars have analyzed that LUCHA plays a critical role in advancing TJ in the DRC by acting as a nonviolent, youth-led force that strengthens the pillar of GoNR. LUCHA mobilizes communities, exposes abuses and demands institutional accountability. Through street protests, civic workshops in universities and public campaigns, the movement works to deter violence and challenge oppressive behavior. Understanding LUCHA helps link past and current TJ efforts and highlights how youth shape justice norms during conflict. This framework is increasingly implemented during ongoing violence, not just after conflict. Long, recurring conflicts in the DRC have produced massive human rights violations. Violence is driven by local, national and regional dynamics: competition for natural resources, land disputes and the involvement of neighboring countries such as Angola, Rwanda and Burundi. The First and Second Congo Wars deeply influenced today´s justice landscape in the DRC. During these times of war and instability, weak formal TJ led to the rise of informal, community alternatives. It is in this context that LUCHA emerged to fill governance gaps where the state was absent or lacked legitimacy. It provided non-state GoNR action helping communities resist abuses as formal GoNR initiatives failed to prevent continued human rights violations.

LUCHA´s core pillar of collective participation is essential for driving reform. Traditional TJ focuses on individual participation but this has proven to be insufficient. Collective participation matters for TJ for recognizing widespread abuses, pressuring the state to reform and empowering victimized groups. Collective participation also gives people empowerment and conscientization. LUCHA strengthens citizens´ belief that they hold power to demand accountability. LUCHA activists work directly in communities most affected by conflict. Their close involvement allows them to detect and expose these violations easier. The movement relies on workshops to teach youth in these areas to question politicians, understand inequality and resist arbitrary detention. Although they rarely use the language of GoNR, LUCHA´s work effectively performs GoNR functions by offering local solutions, empowering citizens and building a politically aware generation committed to collective, nonviolent action. The group also promotes inter-ethnic solidarity by leading workshops in universities to prevent ethnic violence between groups such as Hunde and Hutu students. In this way, LUCHA advances the preventive aims of TJ from the ground up. The DLP Research Study argues that the movement also manages to produce transformational change of groups through cognitive liberation. Cognitive liberation leads people to question the legitimacy of corrupt institutions, realize they have rights and empowers the youth to believe that they can change things themselves.

== Major campaigns and non-violent activism ==
LUCHA has implemented several concrete, high-profile campaigns. For example, in 2015, it played a central role in the #Telema protests, leading peaceful youth mobilizations that helped block Kabila´s attempt to change the constitution for a third term and internationalizing the crisis. The movement also led the #FreeFred and #FreeYves campaigns after 2 of its activists were jailed, using national and international advocacy to secure their release. One of LUCHA´s first major initiatives was the #GomaNeedsWater campaign of 2013-2014 which demanded improvements to Goma´s water infrastructure. Although access to water currently remains a challenge, the campaign succeeded in drawing both local and global attention to the issue. LUCHA also pushed for the construction of roads in Goma and achieved modest but meaningful results through petitions, online campaigns and meetings with government officials and parliamentarians. The movement managed to pressure authorities into building small sections of roads. Activists observed that each time they applied pressure, two or three kilometers of road would be constructed but once the pressure stopped, so did the work.

These campaigns, along with strategic use of technology, illustrate LUCHA´s use of non-violent activism. LUCHA relies heavily on mobile phones and social media to make more people able to access reliable information, document repression and coordinate actions across cities and provinces. LUCHA activists have used web technologies and social media like Facebook, Twitter, and Meetup to coordinate events. The digital evolution with the improvements on the application such as WhatsApp, Imo and Skype has helped the movement with communications, conference calls among participants in various locations within the DR Congo as well as the Congolese diaspora via various Congolese online media, such as Congo Mikili. The group has also been organizing workshops across the country to teach youth on how to engage in social and political issues.

This digital infrastructure allows the movement to overcome weak physical infrastructure transforming LUCHA from a local initiative into a national movement. Despite this, most activists lack strong digital security and online activity exposes them to repression.

LUCHA has also extended its nonviolent activism to issues involving regional security interventions. The movement has publicly challenged the legitimacy of the East African Community Regional Force, arguing that the force failed to protect civilians, remained passive toward M23 and threatened national sovereignty through buffer zones. LUCHA used street protests and social media like X (Twitter) to challenge the legitimacy of this force. The failed regional intervention of the EACRF emphasizes the need for civil actors.

== Repression of LUCHA and civic activism ==
LUCHA protests occurred amid a broader crackdown on civic movements. Since 2015, security forces killed nearly 300 protesters and arrested hundreds of pro-democracy activists, placing LUCHA within a climate of severe repression. Many detained activists were held in illegal detention centers without charges. Security forces arrested and injured dozens of LUCHA members during peaceful protests in 2018. On April 25, 2018 42 LUCHA activists were arrested in Beni. On May 1, 2018 27 LUCHA activists were arrested during a LUCHA protest in Goma. On June 10, 2018, LUCHA prominent leader Luc Nkulula died in a suspicious house fire in Goma, raising widespread concert about targeted intimidation. Some of the government tactics used to undermine citizen movements like LUCHA consisted in recruiting youth to infiltrate protests, provoke violence and disrupt demonstrations, including those led by LUCHA and church groups. The ruling party´s youth league members were trained and mobilized to carry out similar violent disruptions during upcoming protests. They were trained to arrest priests, provoke violence, occupy parishes and they were rewarded with high positions after carrying out these actions. The government also shut down internet and text messaging nationwide during protest days (January 21 and February 25, 2018) to prevent coordination by movements like LUCHA. During these days, security forces fired live bullets and teargas into Catholic Church grounds to disrupt peaceful services and protest marches following Sunday Mass. They also fired teargas into maternity wards in Kinshasa endangering newborn babies and mothers. Multiple opposition-linked media outlets remained closed and new regulations required online media to seek government approval, raising fears of internet censorship. This was especially relevant because LUCHA relied heavily on social media. The 2016 Church-mediated New Year´s Eve Agreement required the release of political prisoners, reopened opposition media, ordered a safe return of exiled leaders and lifted the ban on peaceful protests. This Agreement was never meaningfully fulfilled and arbitrary arrests of activists continued despite the agreement.

Early 2015, two prominent LUCHA members Fred Bauma and Yves Makwambala were arrested in Kinshasha and accused of threatening state security. They were held for over a year without trial and after the Supreme Court rejected their release, they began a hunger strike. Fred and Yves hunger strike was situated within a broader pan-African youth wave inspired by movements like Burkina Faso´s Balai Citoyen. The international community express concerns over repression of LUCHA. US, France, Belgium and the UK all condemned the arrests and politically motivated charges against LUCHA members, viewing the crackdown as a broader assault on civic freedoms. Tom Perriello, the US special envoy to the Great Lakes, said the US was deeply disappointed about the charges against Bauma and Makwanbala, as the two began their midnight hunger strikes. At the time, nearly 30 LUCHA members were imprisoned, including 18 arrested in Goma and 6 others sentenced to 6 months simply for making protest banners at home. The government argued that LUCHA protests without prior authorization risked destabilizing the country, while LUCHA and its lawyers emphasized that the charges were empty and politically motivated. Despite the government´s attempts to delegitimize the movement, activists claim that LUCHA´s horizontal and grassroots structure made it difficult to control as it was a rare organizational model in Congolese political history.

2021 saw continuation of repression with several LUCHA activists shot, arrested and prosecuted for participating in peaceful protests. In September 2021, 21 year old LUCHA activist La Fontaine Katsaruhande had his right leg amputated due to a gunshot wound during a peaceful demonstration in Beni. No police officer was investigated or punished, despite complaints being filed. In January 2022, another LUCHA activist, Mumbere Ushindi was shot by police during a peaceful protest and died shortly after. He was the third LUCHA activist killed during peaceful protests in Beni since 2019. In November 2021, 13 LUCHA activists were arrested in Beni for protesting against the state of siege. 12 of them were sentenced by a military court to one year in prison and fined for disobeying the law. Once they appealed the sentence before the Goma Military Court, Amnesty International called for their immediate release.

== Cultural influence and "Artivisme" ==
Scholars have described how LUCHA has helped transform art into a vehicle for non-violent resistance in the DRC. LUCHA members such as Ben Kamuntu, Don Luis Abedi, and De Paul Bakulu helped spark the slam poetry movement in Goma. These artists merged political activism and poetry creating a style known as "poélitique" which uses art as a tool for broader political consciousness. Along with their activism, two French films helped make LUCHA well known: the documentary Congo Lucha by Marlène Rabaus and the animated film LUCHA; the story of a blodless revolution in Congo by Justine Brabant and Annick Kamgang.

Slam Activism, which emerged in 2013, became another form of nonviolent resistance, inspired by LUCHA´s ethos and organizational model. A group of four young students in Goma met through art classes. They became friends and shared a love for slam poetry which they discovered over the radio. These four students were Ben Kamuntu, a LUCHA member studying drama at the Goma cultural center, Don Louis Abedi, also a LUCHA member working as assistant instructor, Ghislain Kabuyaya, activist studying poetry and De Paul Kabulu also called Spnier who they met at a Spoken Arts Workshop.

In 2017, Goma Glass Sessions were created by four slammers which sought to call for political change and criticize Kabila by calling for democracy in the group slam "My Wish for the Congo". Goma Glass Sessions directly modeled itself on LUCHA, adopting the movement´s organizational style. GGS included a charter based on LUCHA´s principles and rules emphasizing non violence, respect, free expression, and collective responsibility. Both LUCHA and GGS see themselves as Schools of Good Citizenship because they are training grounds for civic responsibility teaching democratic engagement, non violent resistance, and service to the community.

During LUCHA´s "Bye- Bye Kabila" 2016 campaign, members faced intimidation, arrests, and repression. Slam artists echoed LUCHA´s protests in their poetry and public performance openly criticizing police repression, corrupt elites and the regime´s human rights abuses. Their slam "Mon voeu pour le Congo" openly called for political change and peaceful resistance. Slam became a way for the youth to reclaim political space and resist through culture, directly influenced by LUCHA´s method of utilizing art like poetry, music, and public performance as a vehicle for civic engagement and nonviolent dissent. Kamuntu, an active LUCHA activist, created a slam piece named Bosembo (“justice”) which called for accountability for long-unpunished crimes in the DRC and supported the creation of an international criminal court, matching LUCHA’s broader demands for justice. Kamuntu´s slam Bosembo supported campaigns demanding accountability for war crimes listed in the UN Report during the #DeboutRapportMapping campaign. The report documented 617 war crimes and crimes against humanty committed between 1993 and 2003 in eastern Congo. During this time, he also publicly stated "art is my weapon" to show how slam is used as activism. Both slam and LUCHA are linked to youth political socialization, not just protest.

The rise of "Artivisme" coincided with LUCHA’s emergence. Bloggers, rappers, musicians, theatre-makers and visual artists began adopting LUCHA´s style of activism calling it Artivisme which is a mix between art and activism. In Goma, "to be an artist is to be an activist" became a common mantra influenced by LUCHA´s ethos. Popular musicians composed songs which served as political commentators. Their music became a public critique of political decisions. Idinco Delcat, a young musician from Beni and active LUCHA member, wrote songs denouncing how the government uses the siege to repress civil activism. Another branch of Artivisme focused on making art from war debris as political critique. This branch used physical remnants of conflict such as bullet shells and machetes to create political art.

Bob White, anthropologist of Congolese music, argues that art provides people with a way to cope with hardship and express themselves freely. Despite this, art activism´s success and impact is limited due to political control and patronage networks. Since colonial times, public performance in Congo has been politically staged and tightly controlled such as under what scholars name Mobutu´s theatre state. Under Mobutu, art was used as a political tool where public performances were used to show loyalty to the regime. Today, public events require heavy permissions, criticism can lead to arrest and because of fear of punishment, many artists avoid political labels heavily limiting criticism of the state. Additionally, art has long been tied to powerful patrons where artists depend on elites for income. Aid donors can unintentionally also become new patrons, potentially compromising the independence of artists. Despite this, in accordance to its ideology and mission, LUCHA continues to refuse funding from NGOs or political groups in order to protect their independence and credibility.

== Notable members ==
- Grace Kabera - Human Rights Activist
- Luc Nkulula - Human Rights Activist
- Judith Maroy- Human Rights Activist
- Ben Kamuntu - Human Rights Activist and student at the Goma cultural center in the drama section
- Don Luis Abedi - Human Rights Activist and assistant instructor
- De Paul Bakulu (also called Sniper) - slam poet, artist and activist
