= Jean-Baudouin Mayo Mambeke =

Congolese politician

Member of the National Assembly
- Constituency: Mont Amba, Kinshasa

Personal details
- Party: Union for the Congolese Nation

Jean-Baudouin Mayo Mambeke is a Congolese politician and Union for the Congolese Nation Member of the National Assembly of the Democratic Republic of the Congo.
