= Acacia Bandubola Mbongo =

DR Congolese businesswoman and politician

- Born: Kisangani, Democratic Republic of the Congo
- Education: Lycée Molière (State School Diploma); Protestant University in Congo (Bachelor of Business Administration)
- Occupations: Businesswoman, politician
- Years active: 2003–present
- Known for: Politics
- Title: Former Cabinet Minister of Economy in the Cabinet of DR Congo

Acacia Bandubola Mbongo, (née Acacia Bandubola), is a Congolese businesswoman and politician, who served as the Minister of the National Economy in the Cabinet of the Democratic Republic of the Congo, from 26 August 2019, until March 2023.

== Background and education ==
Bandubola was born in the city of Kisangani, to Henriette Mbokoso Bokwetenge and Raphael Bandubola. She attended CS Okapi, a private school in Kisangani, where her parents lived at the time. In 1994, Acacia Bandubola relocated to Kinshasa, the capital and largest city in the country. She continued her studies at Lycée Bosangani from 1994 until 1999. In 2000, she graduated with a State School Diploma from Lycée Molière. She holds a Bachelor of Business Administration from the Protestant University in the Congo.

== Career ==
=== In business ===
Bandubola has worked for Ecobank, FINCA, Banque Internationale pour l'Afrique au Congo (BIAC), and Vodacom. She also worked at a private economic consultancy firm in France.

=== In politics ===
Bandubola began her political activism as a student, in opposition to the oppressive policies of Mobutu Sese Seko. She belonged and supported several political parties while in the Democratic Republic of the Congo, including Envol and RNS.

While working in France, she was introduced to the ideology of Étienne Tshisekedi and joined the Union for Democracy and Social Progress (Democratic Republic of the Congo) (UDPS) political party. She became a vocal supporter of UDPS on many media outlets (radio and television) in the West. In the cabinet announced on 29 August 2019, she was appointed as the Minister of National Economy, replacing Joseph Kapika, who served in that position from April 2017, until August 2019.

As minister, she condemns the practice of some businesses in the DRC, raising prices of staple consumables, including corn flour, sugar and rice, due to the Coronavirus scare. She recommends that government, businesses and the public should work together to maintain price stability during the pandemic. Short of that, she recommends that government should fix commodity prices, when businesses engage in price gouging.

== Family ==
Acacia Bandubola Mbongo is a married mother.

== See also ==
- Félix Tshisekedi
- Ève Bazaiba
