= Ministry of the Interior and Security, Decentralization, and Customary Affairs =

Government ministry of the Democratic Republic of the Congo

Department overview
- Jurisdiction: Democratic Republic of the Congo
- Headquarters: Gombe, Kinshasa
- Minister responsible: Jacquemain Shabani

The Ministry of the Interior, Security, Decentralization, and Customary Affairs of the Democratic Republic of the Congo (French: Ministère de l'Intérieur, Sécurité, Décentralisation et Affaires Coutumières de la république démocratique du Congo) is a central government body charged with overseeing territorial governance, national security, and customary governance. It manages relations between the central government and provincial governors, regulates and registers political parties, and conducts population identification and census operations. The ministry also directs migration and refugee affairs, supervises the National Police and security services, and administers matters of public order, domestic security, and counterterrorism policies.

In addition, it collaborates with the Independent National Electoral Commission in organizing elections, coordinates disaster management with other ministries, provides protection for internally displaced persons, and is tasked with border surveillance, control of foreign nationals, the application of firearms legislation, and matters related to private security services.

== Missions ==
=== Internal security and public order ===
The Ministry is the primary authority for maintaining internal security and public order throughout the national territory. It coordinates with law enforcement agencies, including the national police and civil security services, to ensure the safety of persons and property. It is also responsible for managing national responses to public emergencies, civil unrest, and natural disasters.

=== Administration, local governance, and decentralization implementation ===
The Ministry supervise and coordinate decentralized territorial entities by ensuring that provincial governments, territorial administrations, and local councils function properly in accordance with the constitutional framework of decentralization. It oversees the appointment and accountability of local administrative officials and facilitates intergovernmental relations between central and subnational levels.

As outlined in the 2006 Constitution, the Ministry works to empower provinces and local governments by supporting capacity-building, fiscal transfers, and the legal frameworks necessary for autonomous governance. This includes promoting participatory democracy and improved service delivery at the local level. It also regulates customary leadership in accordance with national law by ensuring the legal recognition of customary chiefs, monitoring their integration into the administrative framework, resolving conflicts related to chiefdoms, and aiming to harmonize modern state structures with indigenous governance practices. Tasked with civil status registration and national ID management, the Ministry handles population records and the issuance of official identity documents. It also aids in compiling demographic data crucial for planning and electoral processes.

=== National security ===
The Ministry collaborates with various ministries and agencies to support national security strategies, including counterterrorism, border control, and maritime safety. A notable example of this collaboration is its involvement in the joint decree on maritime security levels, following the ISPS Code.

== Services ==
No.	Service	Mission	Ref.
1.	The National School for Territorial Training (École Nationale de Formation Territoriale; ECFT)	A higher education institution dedicated to supporting local development, with its primary mission to train senior and mid-level executives capable of assuming responsibilities within decentralized territorial administrations.	
2.	The Civil Protection Council (Conseil de la Protection Civile; CPC)	Coordinates efforts in prevention, education, and emergency response in the event of natural disasters or other major incidents. The CPC functions as a platform for consultation that brings together various stakeholders, including government agencies and civil society organizations involved in risk and crisis management. Its primary responsibilities include ensuring effective coordination among the different services engaged in disaster management, such as security forces, health services, and local authorities. Additionally, it implements preventive measures by educating the public about risks, raising awareness about safety procedures, and developing emergency response plans. In the event of a disaster, the CPC organizes and coordinates relief operations to provide humanitarian assistance to affected populations.	
3.	The General Directorate of Migration (Direction Générale de Migration; DGM)	Oversees the control of the entry, stay, and departure of foreign nationals on Congolese territory and is also responsible for issuing residence permits and travel documents to both foreigners and Congolese citizens residing abroad.	
4.	The National Intelligence Agency (Agence Nationale de Renseignements; ANR)	The nation's principal intelligence and security agency, mandated to safeguard the internal and external security of the state. Its core mission involves the protection of national sovereignty, territorial integrity, population, and institutions against threats of both domestic and foreign origin. The agency is responsible for identifying and documenting offenses that compromise national security. It monitors individuals and groups deemed to pose potential threats and contributes to the preservation of a political climate conducive to the exercise of public freedoms. The ANR also plays a key role in civil identification through fingerprinting of Congolese citizens and cooperates with INTERPOL in tracking fugitives. Furthermore, it participates in efforts to combat transnational crimes such as drug trafficking, smuggling, terrorism, and high-level economic offenses that may undermine the stability of the state or global peace.	
5.	The Permanent Commission on Borders (Commission Permanente des Frontières; CPF)	Delineates and marks the national borders of the Democratic Republic of the Congo, which involves accurately establishing the territorial limits with neighboring countries to prevent disputes related to border issues. The CPF is also responsible for managing and resolving potential border disputes that may arise, ensuring peaceful and amicable solutions. Additionally, it works to strengthen cross-border cooperation by promoting peaceful border management, which in turn facilitates economic and cultural exchanges with neighboring countries.	
6.	The National Commission for Disarmament and International Security (Commission Nationale du Désarmement et de la Sécurité Internationale; CONADESI)	Oversees and coordinates the country's efforts in disarmament, non-proliferation, and international security. It plays a crucial role in implementing the DRC's international commitments in the areas of peace and security.	
7.	The General Inspectorate of the Territorial Administration (Inspection Générale de la Territoriale; IGTER)	Monitors, evaluates, and controls the activities of authorities within administrative entities, as well as overseeing the central and specialized services. In essence, the IGTER acts as a vigilant oversight body, ensuring that laws and government decisions are properly implemented at the local level. Its specific missions include monitoring the administrative and financial management of decentralized territorial entities such as provinces, territories, and cities; evaluating the performance of local administrations; verifying that administrative acts comply with current legislation; preventing and combating corruption and other administrative offenses; and proposing corrective measures in cases of dysfunctions.	
8.	The National Commission for the Control of Small Arms and Light Weapons (Commission Nationale de Contrôle des Armes Légères et de Petit Calibre; CNC-ALPC)	Implements national policies related to the control of small arms and light weapons (SALW). Its tasks include combating the illegal proliferation of SALW, improving the tracing of weapons to identify their origin and movement, raising public awareness about the dangers associated with possessing and using weapons unlawfully, and supporting the competent authorities in enforcing national laws and regulations concerning arms control.	
9.	The National Office for the Identification of the Population (Office National de l'Identification de la Population; ONIP)	Addresses a critical need to systematically and effectively identify the Congolese population, both within and outside the national borders. Its main missions include the comprehensive registration and identification of all Congolese citizens as well as foreign residents in the Democratic Republic of the Congo. ONIP manages a centralized database that consolidates all biometric and administrative data related to each identified individual. Additionally, it is responsible for issuing biometric identity cards, which are secure documents that incorporate biometric data such as fingerprints and photographs. The office also plays a vital role in combating fraud and identity theft by utilizing centralized data and biometric technologies to prevent various forms of document fraud and misrepresentation.	
10.	The Monitoring Committee for Police Reform (Comité de Suivi de la Réforme de la Police; CSRP)	Oversee and steer the implementation of comprehensive reforms aimed at modernizing and professionalizing the Congolese National Police (Police Nationale Congolaise; PNC). The primary mission of the CSRP is to ensure the coordination of all activities carried out within the framework of the national police reform. This includes facilitating dialogue between government representatives and international stakeholders involved in the reform process.	
11.	The National Commission for Refugees (Commission Nationale pour les Réfugiés; CNR)	Legally and administratively protect the country's refugees and find long-term solutions to the challenges they face—such as integration, voluntary repatriation, or resettlement—while ensuring their rights are respected.	
12.	The Congolese Center for Mine Action (Centre Congolais de Lutte Anti-Mines; CCLAM)	Coordinates the country's mine action efforts, with a mission to plan and execute the national mine action strategy, accredit mine action operators, and oversee quality management in the clearance of landmines and explosive remnants of war, including cluster munitions. CCLAM also manages the national mine action database, compiles and disseminates operational data, and prepares national and international reports, such as those required under Article 7 of the Mine Ban Treaty.	
13.	The Unit for Project Management and Public Procurement (Cellule de Gestion des Projets et des Marchés Publics; CGPMP)	In terms of project management, the CGPMP identifies needs, drafts technical project documents, formulates terms of reference, and oversees the execution of feasibility studies, technical specifications, and infrastructure works. It ensures the integration of project requirements into the national budgetary framework and supervises the delivery and acceptance of completed works, goods, and services. In the realm of public procurement, the CGPMP plans procurement operations, prepares and launches calls for tenders, evaluates bids, drafts and finalizes contract agreements, and monitors contract execution. It also ensures regulatory compliance by submitting required documentation to the General Directorate for Public Procurement Oversight and the Public Procurement Regulatory Authority (Surveillance des marchés publics et Autorité de régulation des marchés publics).	
14.	The Government Mechanism for Security (Mécanisme gouvernemental de la sécurité; MGS)		
15.	The National Commission for Combating Mineral Fraud (Commission Nationale de Lutte Contre la Fraude Minière; CNLCFM)	Design, coordinate, implement, and monitor joint operational measures to combat mineral fraud and smuggling nationwide.	
16.	The General Inspection of Territorial Administration (Inspection Générale de la Territoriale; IGT)		
17.	The Public Order Commission (Commission de l'Ordre Public; COP)		
18.	The Permanent Secretariat of the Conference of Governors (Secrétariat Permanent de la Conférence des Gouverneurs; SPCG)		
19.	The Superior Council of the Police (Conseil Supérieur de la Police; CSP)		
