= Union for Democracy and Social Progress =

Political party in the Democratic Republic of the Congo

Union for Democracy and Social Progress Union pour la Démocratie et le Progrès Social
- Abbreviation: UDPS
- President: Félix Tshisekedi
- Founded: 15 February 1982 (44 years ago)
- Split from: Popular Movement of the Revolution
- Headquarters: 546 avenue Zinnias, Limete, Kinshasa
- Ideology: Social democracy
- Political position: Centre-left
- National affiliation: Sacred Union of the Nation
- International affiliation: Progressive Alliance; Socialist International
- Slogan: "Le peuple d'abord" ("The people first")
- National Assembly: 69 / 484

Website
- www.udps.net

The Union for Democracy and Social Progress (French: Union pour la Démocratie et le Progrès Social, UDPS) is a major political party in the Democratic Republic of the Congo (DRC). Founded in 1982, amid the one-party rule of Mobutu Sese Seko and his Popular Movement of the Revolution, it is the country's oldest existing party. During the presidency of Joseph Kabila, it was the largest opposition party in the country. The party identifies as social democratic.

The party is led by Félix Tshisekedi, who has served as President of the DRC since his election in 2018. Tshisekedi's assumption of the presidency was the first peaceful transition of power in the country since it became independent from Belgium in 1960. He was reelected in 2023. His father Étienne Tshisekedi previously led the party.

== History ==
=== Mobutu dictatorship ===
The party can trace its origins to a group of dissenting parliamentarians during the dictatorship of Mobutu Sese Seko and his Popular Movement of the Revolution (MPR). In December 1980, Mobutu received a 52-page open letter calling for the democratization of the political system in Zaire (as the DRC was then known) and the permittance of opposition parties. It was signed by 13 parliamentarians and dated 1 November 1980. Although the letter has been cited as the first non-violent challenge to Mobutu and his one-party rule, the letter attempted to justify its proposals by citing the 1967 constitution and Manifesto of N'sele, which were authored by Mobutu and his party. Mobutu quickly had the letter's authors arrested but granted them amnesty shortly afterwards in January 1981. However, the authors were stripped of their mandates and exiled to their respective home provinces. Nonetheless, despite the efforts of the Zairean interior ministry, many of the authors would return to the capital Kinshasa later that same year to speak with other opposition figures.

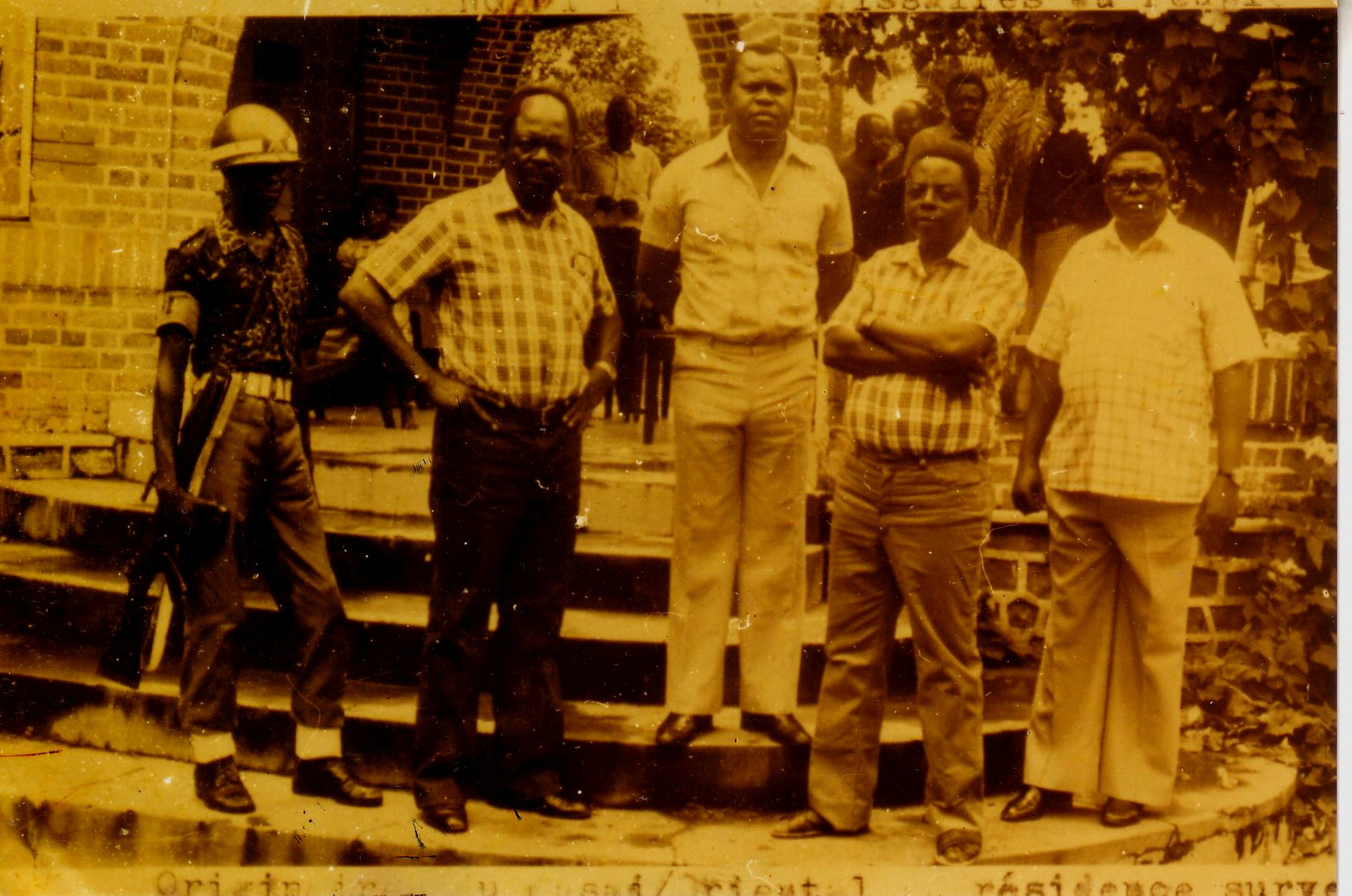
Left to right: parliamentarians Mpinga Makanda, Étienne Tshisekedi, Joseph Ngalula, and Isidore Kanana Tshiongo a Minanga, detained by Mobutu

On 15 February 1982, the Union for Democracy and Social Progress (French abbreviation: UDPS) was founded in Kinshasa with a declared commitment to the 1967 constitution. The party's founding members asserted that the 1967 constitution permitted the creation of the party; Mobutu, however, disagreed. Some members of the 13 were arrested the following month and sentenced to 15 years in prison for aggravated treason. Notably, former president of the Supreme Court Marcel Lihau testified on behalf of the defense. Six of those arrested were freed the next year but were banished from their home villages.

Unlike other opposition groups of the time, the party was able to survive as it existed both outside and inside the country, with some leaders, such as Étienne Tshisekedi, attempting to function within the country. The party also received support from United States Democratic Representatives Stephen Solarz and Howard Wolpe.

In 1987, the last UDPS leaders—Kibassa, Bossassi, Faustin Birindwa, and former deputies Kanana, Makanda, Ngalula, and Tshisekedi—rejoined the MPR, though being allowed to function as a "tendency", according to Tshisekedi. This action was criticised by the party's small number of supporters abroad and "true militants isolated in Kinshasa." According to Jeune Afrique, the UDPS had no impact on the vast country, being known only to a few high-level bureaucrats and party dignitaries in some regions.

In January 1988, Tshisekedi returned to Kinshasa and attempted to address a public meeting, only to be beaten and arrested by police, along with hundreds of other participants. In February 1989, thousands of students took to the streets of Kinshasa, protesting IMF-inspired austerity measures that included the elimination of student buses and hikes in tuition fees. After suppressing the demonstration, security forces arrested Tshisekedi's wife, apparently to pressure the UDPS leader into confessing that he had instigated the protest. Other UDPS leaders were arrested on the same occasion, even as former UDPS president Kibassa was appointed Minister of Sports.

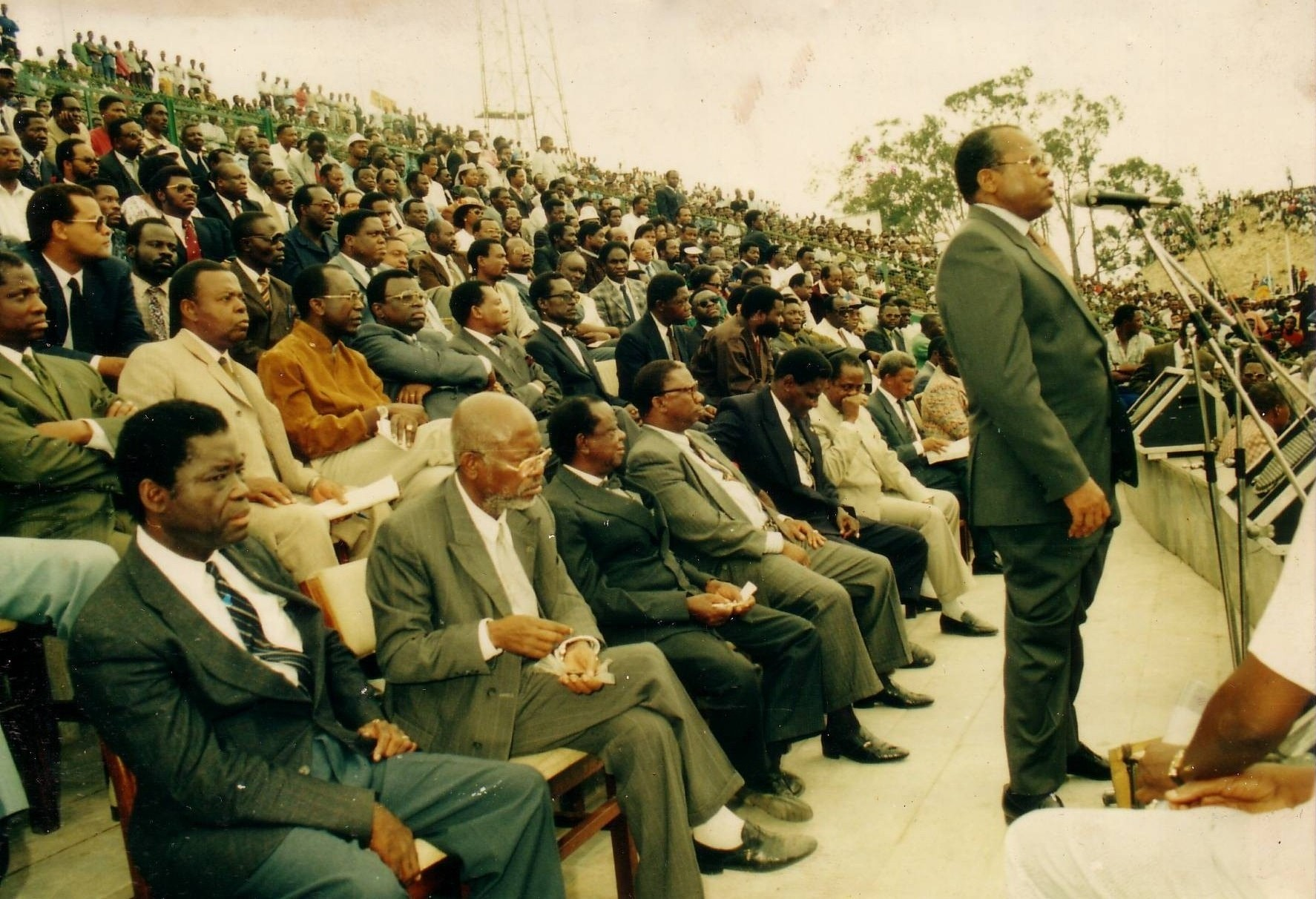
First meeting of the Union Sacrée de l'Opposition Radicale at the Stade du 20 Mai (Stade Tata Raphaël) in Kinshasa. Étienne Tshisekedi speaks from a microphone on the right. At the first chair in the front row is Marcel Lihau; to his left is Vincent Mbwakiem.

In early 1991, the UDPS and other leading opposition parties formed the Sacred Union of the Radical Opposition (Union Sacree de l’Opposition Radicale, USOR), committing to ousting Mobutu. Succumbing to both international and domestic pressure, Mobutu agreed to convene a National Conference. Following the conference, known as the Sovereign National Conference, UDPS leader Étienne Tshisekedi emerged as the main rival to Mobutu. Bowing to international pressure, Mobutu appointed Tshisekedi to the office of Prime Minister of Zaire on three occasions in the 1990s, but Mobutu allegedly interfered and prevented Tshisekedi from carrying out his mandate each time. Despite his (temporary) acceptance of Tshisekedi as prime minister, Mobutu would cling onto power as he maintained control over key institutions and continued to exhibit formidable political skills, practising successful divide and rule tactics against the domestic opposition as well as his former western backers.

=== Kabila presidency ===
The UDPS was a major opposition party during the presidency of Joseph Kabila from 2001 to 2019. The party called for a boycott of the 2005 constitutional referendum and the 2006 general election. Prior to the latter, the Commission Electorale Indépendante (CEI) – the DRC's electoral body – had refused a request by the UDPS for seats in the CEI, seats in the High Authority for the Media (Haute Autorité des medias), and the reopening of the electoral lists so that UDPS members could register as candidates for the election.

The party won 42 seats in the 2011 parliamentary election. Tshisekedi finished runner-up in the concurrent presidential election with just under a third of the national vote. The election was marred by violence and delays; voting was extended to a second day due to the failed deliveries of ballot boxes to some parts of the country.

Etienne Tshisekedi died of pulmonary embolism on 1 February 2017. He was succeeded as president of the UDPS by his son, Félix Tshisekedi.

Five months before the 2018 general election, the UDPS and three other opposition parties made a joint statement calling for the return of key opposition figures from exile, the release of political prisoners, and the de-escalation of tensions between supporters of the government and the opposition. The opposition had been in open conflict with the Commission Electorale Nationale Indépendante (formerly the Commission Electorale Indépendante or CEI), which they charged with being pro-Kabila.

=== Tshisekedi presidency ===
Tshisekedi contested and won the 2018 presidential election. He was confirmed as the winner by the Constitutional Court of the DRC on 20 January 2019, after a failed challenge from the runner-up Martin Fayulu. Tshisekedi was sworn in as president shortly after on 24 January. It was the first peaceful transition of power in the country since it became independent from Belgium in 1960. Tshisekedi's critics at the time described him as unproven, inexperienced, and lacking the charisma of his father. For example, Valentin Mubake, the UDPS' former secretary-general, commented: "His father was a man of the country. The son is very limited." Tshisekedi had never held a high office or managerial role, in contrast to his father's long career as a prominent figure of the country's opposition.

Analysts described Tshisekedi's victory as a victory for Kabila as well, due to the UDPS' alleged coordination with pro-Kabila parties in the lead up to the election. Pro-Kabila parties won a majority of seats in the concurrent parliamentary election.

The UDPS won a plurality of seats in the 2023 parliamentary election. Parties allied with the UDPS also won a significant number of seats. However, Tshisekedi, who was reelected in the concurrent presidential election, was unable to form a government immediately due to disagreements between member parties of the ruling coalition. An attempted coup on 19 May 2024 further delayed the formation of a government. A new government was finally announced on 29 May 2024.

The 2023 election was marred by threats and attacks by UDPS supporters against opposition party leaders and journalists. Supporters of the opposition were also implicated in acts of political violence. A major incident occurred on 7 November, when UDPS supporters clashed with supporters of Moïse Katumbi's opposition party, Together for the Republic (French abbreviation: Ensemble), at a rally in Kasumbalesa, in southeastern Haut-Katanga Province. Witnesses charged Ensemble supporters with ransacking a local UDPS office and UDPS supporters with attacking and injuring six people, raping at least two women, and sexually assaulting three others. Logistical delays also arose once again, leading to accusations of fraud levied against the UDPS.

In August 2024, the UDPS' disciplinary body dismissed party leader Augustin Kabuya, who had held the position since February 2022. The decision came amid accusations from his internal opponents of nepotism and mismanagement, among other things.

== Ideology ==
When the party established itself in 1982, it, unlike other opposition groups, positioned itself as distinctly moderate. It identified itself as "the party of peace and justice for all", committing to achieving democracy in Zaire through non-violent means by using the following methods: free elections, multiparty system, freedom of press and associations, and free market economy.

Currently, the UDPS identifies as a social democratic party. Its slogan is le peuple d'abord, meaning "the people first".

== Factions ==
In 2001, Digitalcongo reported the existence of five factions within the UDPS, including one led by Tshisekedi and another led by Kibassa. In 2004, a joint mission in Kinshasa reported the existence of three factions: the two previously mentioned and the UDPS Action Group (Groupe d'action de l'UDPS), led by Norbert Luyeye.

Following Tshisekedi's death in 2017, the party was plagued by internal conflicts, leading to the formation multiple factions, some of which opposed the transfer of leadership to Félix Tshisekedi. In 2018, there were four registured parties that claimed the UDPS name, despite electoral law banning the duplication of political parties. These were UDPS / Kibassa, UDPS / Mubake / Rénové, UDPS / Tharcisse Loseke, and UDPS / Tshisekedi. Separately, the CENI website listed the same factions but with UDPS / Tshibala instead of UDPS / Tharcisse Loseke.

=== UDPS / Kibbssa ===
The UDPS / Kibbssa is a dissident faction of the UDPS that was created by Kibassa in 1996 following a quarrel over legitimacy between him and Tshisekdi. Kibassa led the faction until his death in 2003, after which Edmond Mukendi became acting national president, as of 2006. The faction was officially recognized by the Kabila government, which diminished "the status and political potential" of the UDPS / Tshisekedi. Kibassa was reportedly open to negotiating with Tshisekedi. However, other sources later reported conflicts between the Kibassa and Tshisekedi wings over the UPDS leadership.

On 10 April 2023, the party joined the Sacred Union of the Nation and supported Félix Tshisekedi's candidacy. In the 2023 National Assembly elections, it won a seat in Mwenga Territory.

== International affiliations ==
The UDPS is a full member of the Progressive Alliance and the Socialist International.

== Membership cards ==
Membership cards can be purchased by party members. They are issued by the UDPS general secretariat in Kinshasa, sent to members' respective federations (either by region or abroad), and distributed among local party sections or cells in their respective jurisdictions. Members who lose their card may be issued a "'proof of membership' after making inquiries with the former federation, section or cell where the applicant claims to have been a member to confirm whether or not they were a member of the UDPS."

== Election results ==
=== Presidential ===
Year	Candidate	Votes	%	Rank	Outcome
2011	Étienne Tshisekedi	5,864,775	32.33%	2nd	Lost
2018	Félix Tshisekedi	7,051,013	38.57%	▲1st	Won
2023	Félix Tshisekedi	13,058,962	73.47%	1st	Won

=== National Assembly ===
Year	Leader	Seats	+/−	Votes	%	Rank	Outcome
2011	Étienne Tshisekedi	42 / 500	▲42	[data missing]	[data missing]	2nd	Opposition
2018	Félix Tshisekedi	32 / 500	▼10	[data missing]	[data missing]	▼3rd	Coalition government
2023	Félix Tshisekedi	69 / 484	▲37	1,664,049	9.26%	▲1st	Coalition government
