= Suminwa government =

Congolese government cabinet

- Government of the Democratic Republic of the Congo
- Incumbent
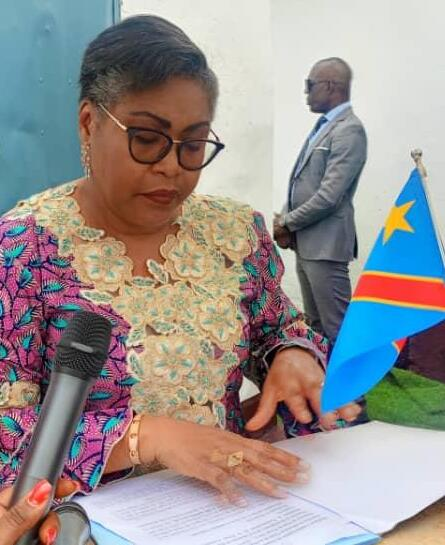
- Judith Suminwa in 2023
- Date formed: 12 June 2024

People and organisations
- President: Félix Tshisekedi
- Prime Minister: Judith Suminwa
- No. of ministers: 52
- Ministers removed: 2 resignations
- Status in legislature: supermajority (coalition)

History
- Election: 2023 general election
- Legislature term: 2024–2028
- Predecessor: Lukonde II

The Suminwa government also known as the Suminwa cabinet was formed following the appointment by President Félix Tshisekedi of Judith Suminwa as the first female Prime Minister of the Democratic Republic of the Congo on 1 April 2024.

The government was named on 29 May and was invested by the National Assembly on 12 June more than five months after the 2023 general election. Of the 405 deputies voting, 397 voted for the investiture and 8 abstained. By 14 June most, if not all, of the ministers had taken office and the government met for the first time as the Council of Ministers presided over by the President. This is the fourth government of Tshisekedi's presidency and the first of his second term.

== Government ==
The 52 member government is composed of 6 deputy prime ministers, 9 ministers of state, 24 ministers, 3 delegate ministers, and 10 deputy ministers. Among the members, 28 are new, 15 have kept their portfolios, and 9 have new ones. There are 16 women and 36 men. All deputy prime ministers are men.

Nearly half the original members, 26 to be precise, were freshly elected members of parliament, either as deputies or senators, when they joined the government. In their case, article 110 of the Constitution took effect, and their parliamentary mandates are suspended while in government to be taken up by their substitutes.

=== Prime minister ===
- Prime Minister: Judith Suminwa Tuluka

=== Deputy Prime Ministers ===
- Minister of the Interior, Security, Decentralization and Customary Affairs: Jacquemain Shabani
- Minister of Transport: Jean-Pierre Bemba
- Minister of National Defense and Veterans Affairs: Guy Kabombo Muadiamvita
- Minister of the Economy: Daniel Mukoko Samba
- Minister of Civil Service, Modernization and Innovation: Jean-Pierre Lihau Ebua
- Minister for Planning and Coordination of Development Aid: Guylain Nyembo

=== Ministers of State ===
- Minister for Agriculture: Grégoire Mutshayi
- Minister for Foreign Affairs: Thérèse Kayikwamba Wagner
- Minister for National Education and New Citizenship: Raissa Malu
- Minister for the Environment and Sustainable Development: Eve Bazaïba
- Minister for Infrastructure and Public Works: Alexis Gisaro
- Minister for Budget: Aimé Boji Sangara
- Minister for Land Affairs: Acacia Bandubola Mbongo
- Minister for Rural Development: Muhindo Nzangi
- Minister for Regional Planning: Guy Loando Mboyo

=== Ministers ===
- Minister of Finance: Doudou Fwamba Likonde
- Minister of Industry and SMEs: Louis Kabamba Watum
- Minister of Water Resources: Teddy Lwamba Moba
- Minister of Mines: Kizito Kapinga Mulume
- Minister of Hydrocarbons: Aimé Sakombi Molendo
- Minister of Employment and Labor: Ephraim Akuakua
- Minister of Urban Planning and Housing: Crispin Mbadu Phanzu
- Minister of Human Rights: Chantal Mwadiamvita
- Minister of Public Health : Samuel Roger Kamba Mulamba
- Minister of Higher and University Education: Marie-Thérèse Safi Sombo
- Minister of Scientific Research and Innovation: Gilbert Kabanda Kurhenga
- Minister of Posts, Telecommunications and New Information and Communication and Digital Technologies: Augustin Kibassa
- Minister of Portfolio: Jean-Lucien Bussa
- Minister of Social Action and Solidarity: Nathalie-Aziza Munana
- Minister of Foreign Trade: Julien Paluku
- Minister of Regional Integration: Didier Mazenga Mukanzu
- Minister of Communication: Patrick Muyaya Katembwe
- Minister of Vocational Training: Marc Ekila Likombio
- Minister of Gender, Family and Children: Léonnie Kandolo
- Minister of Fisheries and Livestock: Jean-Pierre Tshimanga Bwana
- Minister of Culture, Arts and Heritage: Yolande Elebe Ma Ndembo
- Minister of Tourism: Didier Mpambia Musanga
- Minister of Sports and Leisure: Didier Budimbu
- Minister of Youth and Patriotic Awakening: Noëlla Ayeganagato

=== Minister-Delegates ===
- Minister Delegate to the Minister of Foreign Affairs, in charge of Cooperation: Bestine Kazadi
- Minister Delegate to the Minister of Urban Planning and Housing, in charge of Urban Policy: Didier Tenge Te Litho
- Minister Delegate to the Minister of Social Affairs, in charge of people living with disabilities: Irène Esambo Diata

=== Deputy Ministers ===
- Deputy Minister of the Interior: Eugénie Tshiela Kamba
- Deputy Minister of Foreign Affairs: Grace Yamba
- Deputy Minister of Justice: Samuel Mbemba
- Deputy Minister of Budget: Elysée Bokumuamua Maposo
- Deputy Minister of Finance: Oneige Nsele
- Deputy Minister of Defense: Samuel Adubango Awotho
- Deputy Minister of Introduction to New Citizenship: Jean-Pierre Kezamudro
- Deputy Minister of Mines: Godard Motemona Gibolum
- Deputy Minister of Hydrocarbons: Wivine Moleka
- Deputy Minister of Customary Affairs: Jean-Baptiste Ndeze

=== Former members ===
- Minister Delegate to the Minister of State for the Environment and Sustainable Development, in charge of the Climate Economy: Stéphanie Mbombo (12–18 June 2024)
- Minister for Justice: Constant Mutamba (13 June 2024–17 June 2025)
