= 2024 Democratic Republic of the Congo Senate elections =

Senate elections were held in the Democratic Republic of the Congo in 2024 and early 2025 to renew the 108 elected members of the Senate elected by indirect ballot by the members of the 26 provincial assemblies. The elections took place in four parts. The election of the 84 senators representing Kinshasa and 19 provinces were held 29 April at the same time as the gubernatorial elections. This was followed by the election of the senators of Equateur and Ituri on 24 May, and on 26 May those of Mai-Ndombe and North Kivu for a total of 16 senators. The election of the last 8 senators from Kwilu and Nord-Ubangi was held on April 2, 2025, alongside governor elections.

These elections followed the re-election of President Félix Tshisekedi at the 2023 presidential election as well as the legislative and provincial elections held concurrently, with the results of the latter leading to the complete renewal of 22 of the 26 electoral colleges responsible for electing senators.

== Electoral system ==
The Senate has 108 elected seats with four seats per province and eight for the city-province of Kinshasa. The members of a provincial assembly make up the electoral college that elects the senators of that province. Provincial assemblies can have between 18 and 48 members depending on voter registration totals.

Senators are elected for the term of five years, renewable, by indirect multi-member proportional voting with open lists and a single preferential vote. The distribution is done according to the largest remainder method. Each senator is elected with two substitutes.

Former elected Presidents of the Republic are by right senators for life. Joseph Kabila is the first president of the Third Republic to have become so in 2019.

== Results ==
Elected Senate seats by party
| Party | Seats | | | | |
| Party | Total | 29 April 2024 | 24 May | 26 May | 2 April 2025 |
|---|---|---|---|---|---|
| Independent | 27 | 21 | 1 | 4 | 1 |
| UDPS/Tshisekedi | 15 | 13 | 1 | 1 | |
| AB | 6 | 5 | | | 1 |
| AFDC-A | 6 | 5 | 1 | | |
| AACPG | 5 | 3 | 1 | | 1 |
| MLC | 5 | 4 | | | 1 |
| 2A/TDC | 4 | 2 | | | 2 |
| A24 | 4 | 4 | | | |
| A/VK2018 | 3 | 3 | | | |
| Ensemble | 3 | 3 | | | |
| A/A-UNC | 2 | 1 | 1 | | |
| AA/C | 2 | 1 | | 1 | |
| AAAP | 2 | 2 | | | |
| ANB | 2 | 2 | | | |
| AVC-A | 2 | 2 | | | |
| CDER | 2 | 1 | | | 1 |
| FPAU | 2 | 1 | 1 | | |
| 4AC | 1 | 1 | | | |
| A/B50 | 1 | | | 1 | |
| A1 | 1 | 1 | | | |
| A3A | 1 | 1 | | | |
| AAAD | 1 | 1 | | | |
| AAeC | 1 | | | 1 | |
| ACP-A | 1 | 1 | | | |
| AN | 1 | 1 | | | |
| APCF | 1 | 1 | | | |
| ARDEV-A | 1 | 1 | | | |
| ART&A | 1 | 1 | | | |
| ATUA | 1 | 1 | | | |
| AV | 1 | 1 | | | |
| CDC/R | 1 | | | | 1 |
| CFC | 1 | | 1 | | |
| MSL | 1 | | 1 | | |
| Total | 108 | 84 | 8 | 8 | 8 |
Data source: CENI

Elected senators
| Province | Senator-elect | Party |
|---|---|---|
| Bas-Uélé | Carole Agito (inc.) | Independent |
| Bas-Uélé | Aminata Namasia | AB |
| Bas-Uélé | Norbert Gebanga | UDPS/Tshisekedi |
| Bas-Uélé | Eddy Pascal Sinango | Independent |
| Équateur | Jonas Mukamba | FPAU |
| Équateur | Jean Paul Boketsu | UDPS/Tshisekedi |
| Équateur | Jean-Claude Baende | Independent |
| Équateur | Gabriel Bolenge | MSL |
| Haut-Katanga | Danny Kabongo | UDPS/Tshisekedi |
| Haut-Katanga | Salomon Kalonda Della | Ensemble |
| Haut-Katanga | Jacques Kyabula (sub1: Christian Kunda) | ARDEV-A |
| Haut-Katanga | Sama Lukonde | Independent |
| Haut-Lomami | Gracia Yamba (sub2: Arsène Yamba) | Independent |
| Haut-Lomami | Alain Ilunga (inc.) | Independent |
| Haut-Lomami | Isabelle Kabamba (inc.) | AAAP |
| Haut-Lomami | Dany Banza} (sub1: Hervé Nkulu) | AB |
| Haut-Uélé | Anna Kumbodimo | Independent |
| Haut-Uélé | Christophe Baseane | Independent |
| Haut-Uélé | Prospère Mangbukele | A1 |
| Haut-Uélé | Jean Pierre Batumoko (inc.) | A/VK2018 |
| Ituri | Idi Tabani | AFDC-A |
| Ituri | Noella Bachebandey | A/A-UNC |
| Ituri | Samuel Adubang'o (sub1: Michel Remo) | AACPG |
| Ituri | Daniel Banio | CFC |
| Kasaï | Joseph Ngalamulume | AFDC-A |
| Kasaï | Hubert Mbingho | AA/C |
| Kasaï | Gaston Nkole | AACPG |
| Kasaï | Clément Muya | 2A/TDC |
| Kasaï-Central | Jean Tshisekedi | APCF |
| Kasaï-Central | Cedric Ngindu | Independent |
| Kasaï-Central | Jean Muntuabu | UDPS/Tshisekedi |
| Kasaï-Central | Sylvain Mukengeshayi | A3A |
| Kasaï-Oriental | José Kalala | AV |
| Kasaï-Oriental | Alphonse Ngoyi | AFDC-A |
| Kasaï-Oriental | José Mpanda | A24 |
| Kasaï-Oriental | Guy Kabombo (sub1: Pierre Kanda) | UDPS/Tshisekedi |
| Kinshasa | Augustin Kabuya (sub1: Roger Tshisekedi) | UDPS/Tshisekedi |
| Kinshasa | Gérard Mulumba | UDPS/Tshisekedi |
| Kinshasa | Micke Kabasele | UDPS/Tshisekedi |
| Kinshasa | Gentiny Ngobila | Independent |
| Kinshasa | Jacques Lunguana | MLC |
| Kinshasa | Arlette Bahati | AFDC-A |
| Kinshasa | Ivan Kazadi | Independent |
| Kinshasa | Anne Mbuguje | AVC-A |
| Kongo Central | Didier Budimbu (sub1: Paoline Nkunku) | AVC-A |
| Kongo Central | Pascal Kinduelo | UDPS/Tshisekedi |
| Kongo Central | Nefertiti Ngudianza (inc.) | AAAP |
| Kongo Central | Baby Vangu | A/VK2018 |
| Kwango | Simon Naa Ikamba | Independent |
| Kwango | Platini Luheto | Independent |
| Kwango | Willy Bitwisila (sub1: Jeancy Diahoya) | Independent |
| Kwango | Justin Kapenda | Independent |
| Kwilu | Papy Labila | 2A/TDC |
| Kwilu | Willy Itsundala | AACPG |
| Kwilu | Jean-Philibert Mabaya (inc.) | CDC/R |
| Kwilu | Marianne Bakiele | Independent |
| Lomami | Jonas Kalambayi | UDPS/Tshisekedi |
| Lomami | Florence Muleka | ATUA |
| Lomami | Pius Muabilu | AACPG |
| Lomami | Adolphe Lumanu | ACP-A |
| Lualaba | Michel Kanyimbu | ART&A |
| Lualaba | Norbert Naweji | Ensemble |
| Lualaba | Célestin Mashata | A24 |
| Lualaba | Fifi Masuka (sub1: Joe Saini) | A24 |
| Mai-Ndombe | Anicet Babanga | AA/C |
| Mai-Ndombe | Aimé Pascal Mongo (sub1: Marcus Makani) | AAeC |
| Mai-Ndombe | Herman Mutima | Independent |
| Mai-Ndombe | Adonis Ngambani | Independent |
| Maniema | Idrissa Mangala | UDPS/Tshisekedi |
| Maniema | Faustin Luanga | Independent |
| Maniema | Justin Kalumba | AACPG |
| Maniema | Pascal Omana | A24 |
| Mongala | Jean-Pierre Lihau (sub1: Gaspar Monganga) | UDPS/Tshisekedi |
| Mongala | Elise Bokumwana (sub1: Claude Bossio) | FPAU |
| Mongala | Aimé Sakombi Molendo (sub1: Bienvenu Essimba) | A/A-UNC |
| Mongala | Michel Lingepo | MLC |
| Nord-Ubangi | Michel Kobanga | AB |
| Nord-Ubangi | Basile Bale (inc.) | MLC |
| Nord-Ubangi | Giala Mobutu (inc.) | 2A/TDC |
| Nord-Ubangi | Anastasie Ngbako | CDER |
| North Kivu | Papy Mumbere Machozi | Independent |
| North Kivu | Jacquemin Shabani (sub1: Janvier Kasiwa) | UDPS/Tshisekedi |
| North Kivu | Jean-Marie Kasereka | A/B50 |
| North Kivu | Célestin Vunabandi (inc.) | Independent |
| Sankuru | René Kalala (sub1: Richard Kimbulu) | Independent |
| Sankuru | Jules Lodi | UDPS/Tshisekedi |
| Sankuru | Bernard Mpetshi | 2A/TDC |
| Sankuru | Christophe Lutundula | AB |
| South Kivu | Norbert Basengezi | AN |
| South Kivu | Modeste Bahati (inc.) | AFDC-A |
| South Kivu | Eustache Muhanzi | A/VK2018 |
| South Kivu | Aristide Bulakali | UDPS/Tshisekedi |
| Sud-Ubangi | Alexis Mondonge | Independent |
| Sud-Ubangi | Nadine Boboy | Independent |
| Sud-Ubangi | Jean-Lucien Bussa (sub1: Willy Bussa) | CDER |
| Sud-Ubangi | Françoise Bemba (inc) | MLC |
| Tanganyika | Vicky Katumwa (inc.) | AFDC-A |
| Tanganyika | Christine Mwando (inc.) | Ensemble |
| Tanganyika | Patrice Pungwe | AB |
| Tanganyika | Kilele Ramazani | 4AC |
| Tshopo | Renabel Kayala | AAAD |
| Tshopo | Jean Bamanisa | MLC |
| Tshopo | Jean-Pierre Daruwezi | Independent |
| Tshopo | Madeleine Nikomba | ANB |
| Tshuapa | Pancrace Boongo | AB |
| Tshuapa | Guy Loando (sub1: Cathy Botema (inc.)) | ANB |
| Tshuapa | Moise Ekumbo | Independent |
| Tshuapa | Corneille Isenge | Independent |
Source: CENI

=== 29 April results ===
On 29 April twenty senate elections combined for the first time with gubernatorial elections, took place without incident. The CENI published the provisional results for the Senate on 30 April and these were confirmed by the Constitutional Court on 16 May.

Of the 84 senators elected, only the three from Ensemble are in the opposition, eight were incumbents—of which six women, and three were also elected governor. To become governor, the governors-elect of Haut-Katanga, Kwango, and Lualaba had to relinquish their senate seats to the benefit of their substitutes.
