= Lukonde government =

Congolese government cabinet

The Prime Minister of the Democratic Republic of the Congo Sama Lukonde was appointed on 15 February 2021. He announced his first cabinet on 12 April 2021. On 24 March 2023, a second cabinet was announced.

== First cabinet ==
The members of the first cabinet were:

- Prime Minister: Jean-Michel Sama Lukonde Kyenge

Deputy Prime Ministers:

- Minister of the Interior, Security, Decentralization and Traditional Affairs: Daniel Aselo Okito.
- Minister of the Environment and Sustainable Development: Ève Bazaiba Masudi
- Minister of Foreign Affairs: Christophe Lutundula Apala
- Minister of the Civil Service, Administrative Modernization and Innovation in Public Services: Jean-Pierre Lihau

Ministers of State:

- Minister of Justice, Keeper of the Seals: Rose Mutombo Kiese.
- Minister of Infrastructure and Public Works: Alexis Gizaro Muvuni
- Minister of Portfolio: Adèle Kahinda Mayina
- Minister of Planning: Christian Mwando Nsimba
- Minister of the Budget: Aimé Boji Sangara Bamanyirue
- Minister of Town Planning and Housing: Pius Muabilu Mbayu Mukala
- Minister of Rural Development: François Rubota Masumbuko
- Minister of Entrepreneurship and Small and Medium-sized Enterprises: Eustache Muhanzi Mubembe
- Minister of Land Management: Guy Loando Mboyo.

Other Ministers:

- Minister of National Defence and War Veterans: Gilbert Kabanda Kurhenga
- Minister of Primary, Secondary and Technical Education: Tony Mwaba Kazadi
- Minister of Public Health, Hygiene and Disease Prevention: Jean-Jacques Mbungani Mbanda
- Minister of Finance: Nicolas Kazadi
- Minister of Transport, Communication Routes and Improving Access to Isolated Regions: Chérubin Okende Senga
- Minister of Agriculture: Désire Nzinga Bilihanzi
- Minister of Fishing and Stockbreeding: Adrien Bokele Djema
- Minister of the National Economy: Jean-Marie Kalumba Yuma
- Ministry of Industry: Julien Paluku Kahongya
- Minister of Regional Integration: Didier Mazenga Mukanzu
- Minister of Higher and University Education: Muhindo Nzangi
- Minister of Scientific Research and Technological Innovation: José Mpanda Kabangu
- Minister of Hydrocarbons: Didier Budimbu Ntubuanga
- Minister of Postal Services, Telecommunications and New Information and Communication Services: Augustin Kibassa
- Minister of Digital Technology: Désiré Cashmir Eberande Kolongele
- Minister of Employment, Labour and Social Security: Ndusi Ntembe
- Minister of Properties and Real Estate Affairs: Aimé Sakombi Molendo
- Minister of Water Resources and Electricity: Olivier Mwenze Mukaleng
- Minister of Human Rights: Albert Fabrice Puela
- Minister of Gender, Family and Children: Gisèle Ndaya Luseba
- Minister of External Trade: Jean-Lucien Bussa Tongba
- Minister of Mining: Antoinette N’Samba Kalambayi
- Minister of Communication and the Media, Government Spokesperson: Patrick Muyaya Katembwe
- Minister of Social Affairs, Humanitarian Actions and National Solidarity: Modeste Mutinga
- Minister of Professional Training and Crafts: Antoinette Kipulu Kabenga
- Minister of Youth, Initiation of New Citizenship and National Cohesion: Yves Bunkulu Zola
- Minister of Sport and Leisure: Serge Tshembo Nkonde
- Minister of Tourism: Modero Nsimba Matondo
- Minister of Culture, the Arts and Heritage: Catherine Katumbu Furaha
- Minister of Relations with Parliament: Anne-Marie Karume Bakaneme
- Minister to the President of the Republic: Nana Manuanina Kihimba
- Minister-delegate to the Minister of Social Affairs, in charge of the Disabled and Other Vulnerable Persons: Irène Esambo Diata

There are also 11 deputy ministers.

- Minister of Petroleum and Gas: Aimé Ngoy Mukena.
- Minister of Humanitarian Actions and National Solidarity: Steve Mbikayi Mabuluki.

== Second cabinet ==
On 24 March 2023, Nine months ahead of the general election, president Félix Tshisekedi rearranged his cabinet in order to better deal with challenges facing the country.

The members of the second cabinet are:

- Prime Minister: Jean-Michel Sama Lukonde Kyenge

Deputy Prime Ministers:

- Minister of the Interior, Security, Decentralization and Traditional Affairs: Peter Kazadi Kankonde
- Minister of National Defense and Veterans: Jean-Pierre Bemba Gombo
- Minister of National Economy: Vital Kamerhe
- Minister of Foreign Affairs and Francophonie: Apala Christophe Lutundula
- Minister of Civil Service, Modernization of Administration and Innovation of Public Service: Jean-Pierre Lihau Ebua

Ministers of State:

- Minister of the Environment and Sustainable Development: Ève Bazaiba Masudi
- Minister of Justice, Keeper of the Seals: Rose Mutombo Kiese
- Minister of Infrastructure and Public Works: Alexis Gizaro Muvuni
- Minister for Regional Cooperation: Antipas Mbusa Nyamwisi
- Minister of the Budget: Aimé Boji Sangara
- Minister of Portfolio: Adèle Kahinda Mayina
- Minister of Planning: Judith Tuluka Tsuminwa
- Minister of Town Planning and Housing: Pius Muabilu Mbayu Mukala
- Minister of Rural Development: François Rubota Masumbuko
- Minister of Decentralization and Institutional Reforms: Eustache Muhanzi Mubembe
- Minister of Regional Planning: Guy Loando Mboyo

Other Ministers:

- Minister of Finance: Nicolas Kazadi
- Minister of Public Health, Hygiene and Prevention: Samuel-Roger Kamba Mulamba
- Minister of Agriculture: José Mpanda Kabangu
- Minister of Primary, Secondary and Technical Education (EPST): Tony Mwaba Kazadi
- Minister of Transport, Ways of Communication and Opening Up: Marc Ekila Likombio
- Minister of Employment, Labor and Social Welfare: Ndusi Ntembe Claudine
- Minister of Fisheries and Livestock: Adrien Bokele Djema
- Minister of Industry: Julien Paluku Kahongya
- Minister of Entrepreneurship and Small and Medium Enterprises: Désire Nzinga Bilihanzi
- Minister of Higher and University Education (ESU): Muhindo Nzangi
- Minister of Scientific Research and Technological Innovation: Gilbert Kabanda Kurhenga
- Minister of Mines: Antoinette Nsamba Kalambayi
- Minister of Hydrocarbons: Didier Mazenga Mukanzu
- Minister of Posts, Telecommunications and New Information and Communication Technologies (PTNTIC): Augustin Kibassa Maliba Lubalala
- Minister of Digital: Désiré Cashmir Eberande Kolongele
- Minister of Land Affairs: Aimé Sakombi Molendo
- Minister of Hydraulic Resources and Electricity: Olivier Mwenze Mukaleng
- Minister of Foreign Trade: Jean-Lucien Bussa Tongba
- Minister of Human Rights: Albert Fabrice Puela
- Minister of Gender, Family and Children: Mireille Masangu
- Minister of Tourism: Didier Mazenga Mukanzu
- Minister of Communications and Media, Government Spokesperson: Patrick Muyaya Katembwe
- Minister of Social Affairs, Humanitarian Actions and National Solidarity: Modeste Mutinga Mutushayi
- Minister of Vocational Training and Trades: Antoinette Kipulu Kabenga
- Minister of Youth, Initiation to New Citizenship and National Cohesion: Yves Bunkulu Zola
- Minister of Sports and Recreation: Claude-François Kabulo Mwana Kabulo
- Minister of Culture, Arts and Heritage: Catherine Katumbu Furaha
- Minister for Relations with Parliament: Anne-Marie Karume Bakaneme
- Minister to the President of the Republic: Nana Manuanina Kihimba
- Minister Delegate to the Minister of Social Affairs, Humanitarian Actions and National Solidarity Responsible for people living with disabilities and other vulnerable people: Irène Esambo Diata

Deputy Ministers:

- Deputy Minister of the Interior, Security, Decentralization and Customary Affairs: Jean-Claude Molipe Mandongo
- Deputy Minister of Foreign Affairs: Crispin Mbadu Phanzu
- Deputy Minister of Justice: Mambu Lawu Thadée
- Deputy Minister of Planning: Pascal Bitiki Omana
- Deputy Budget Minister: Elysée Bokumuamua Maposo
- Deputy Minister of National Defence: Samuel Adubango Awotho
- Deputy Minister of Finance: O'Neige N'Sele Mimpa
- Deputy Minister of Mines: Godard Motemona Gibolum
- Deputy Minister of Public Health and Prevention: Olen Obe A Nzem Serge
- Deputy Minister of EPST: Aminata Namasiya Bazego
- Deputy Minister of Hydrocarbons: Wivine Moleka
- Deputy Minister of Transport and Communication: Séraphine Tulugu Kutuna
