= Muhindo =

Muhindo is a given name and a surname. Notable people with the name include:

== Given name ==
- Muhindo Nzangi (born 1980), Congolese politician

== Surname ==
- Jane Asiimwe Muhindo (born c. 1988), Ugandan Politician
- Mathilde Muhindo (born c. 1954), Congolese human rights activist
