= Adèle Kahinda =

Woman congolese politician

Adèle Kahinda Mayina

Minister of State Minister of Portfolio
- In office 27 April 2021 – 13 June 2024
- President: Félix Tshisekedi
- Prime Minister: Sama Lukonde
- Preceded by: Clément Kwete
- Succeeded by: Jean-Lucien Bussa

Member of the National Assembly
- Constituency: Sandoa

Personal details
- Party: Alliance des Forces Démocratiques du Congo
- Occupation: politician

Adèle Kahinda Mahina is a politician from the Democratic Republic of the Congo who served as Minister of State, Minister of Portfolio in the Lukonde governments from April 2021 to June 2024. She is a member of Modeste Bahati Lukwebo's Alliance des Forces Démocratiques du Congo, and a longstanding deputy in the National Assembly.

== Life ==
Princess Adèle Kahinda Mahina comes from the royal family of the Tshokwe people, from near Mwathisenge in Sandoa Territory, Lualaba Province. She was elected to the National Assembly as a deputy representing Sandoa, and has served in the National Assembly for over a decade.

She has been president of the caucus of women parliamentarians, and president of the gender and parity parliamentary network. She was also president of the Alliance des Forces Démocratiques du Congo – a parliamentary group.

After several months of negotiating the composition of the Sacred Union of the Nation in early 2021, on 12 April 2021 Adèle Kahinda was announced as Minister of Portfolio within the Lukonde cabinet.
