= Palais de Justice, Kinshasa =

Judicial complex in Gombe, Kinshasa

Palais de Justice
- Didier Reynders, European Commissioner for Justice, speaks with Rose Mutombo, Minister of Justice, at the palace

General information
- Status: Completed
- Type: Judicial complex
- Architectural style: Modernist
- Location: Place de l'Indépendance, Gombe, Kinshasa, Democratic Republic of the Congo
- Year built: 2010–2014
- Construction started: 27 January 2010; 16 years ago
- Completed: 4 March 2014; 12 years ago
- Inaugurated: 20 February 2015; 11 years ago
- Cost: Approximately €3 million
- Owner: Government of the Democratic Republic of the Congo

Technical details
- Floor count: 3

Design and construction
- Main contractor: SAFRICAS

Other information
- Parking: Two parking facilities: one at the rear of the building and another in the basement

The Palais de Justice (French pronunciation: [palɛ d(ə) ʒystis], lit. 'Palace of Justice') is a judicial complex in Gombe, Kinshasa, Democratic Republic of the Congo. It houses several courts and judicial offices. Construction of a new judicial building in Kinshasa began in January 2010 on land behind the existing Palais de Justice. The building was completed in 2014 and officially inaugurated by President Joseph Kabila in February 2015.

In 2022, construction began on a separate building for administrative courts in Kasa-Vubu, Kinshasa. Meanwhile, the original Palais de Justice in Gombe underwent major renovations, which were reported in October 2025.

== History ==
The need to build and improve court facilities in Kinshasa came as part of the changes brought by the DRC's 2006 Constitution. These changes included the creation of three major courts: the Constitutional Court, the Council of State, and the Court of Cassation. Their purpose was to take over responsibilities that had once belonged to the Supreme Court of Justice (Cour suprême de justice; CSJ), which was previously the highest court in the country. With these new institutions being introduced, the government also needed to provide proper buildings and offices where they could carry out their work. The existing court facilities were not suitable for these needs. In June 2021, Félix Vundwawe Te Pemako, First President of the Council of State, noted that since independence, the country had not had a Palais de Justice commensurate with its status, apart from the building inherited from Belgian rule.

Construction plans for a new Palais de Justice in Kinshasa started in January 2010. On 27 January, the president of the National Assembly, Évariste Boshab, attended a ceremony to launch the project and laid the foundation stone on behalf of president Joseph Kabila. Funding for the project came from the European Union through its Ninth European Development Fund (9th EDF). Funding estimates varied, with the Agence Congolaise de Presse reporting a total cost of approximately €9 million, entirely covered by the fund, while Radio Okapi cited an EU contribution of €1.95 million for the 12-month construction programme. The construction project was carried out under the EU's Governance Support Programme (Programme d'appui à la gouvernance; PAG).

Planned behind the existing Palais de Justice in Gombe, the 3,128-square-metre annex was intended to accommodate several institutions established under the 2006 Constitution, including the Constitutional Court, the Council of State, the Superior Council of the Judiciary, the High Military Court and the Office of the Prosecutor General. The Court of Cassation, Justice Minister Luzolo Bambi indicated, would instead occupy the existing Supreme Court of Justice building. The proposed complex included offices for approximately 123 staff, a 120-square-metre reception hall, two courtrooms with a combined capacity of 175 people and a 100-square-metre central archive. The wider development plan also envisaged a facility for the National Institute for the Training of Magistrates and other judicial personnel. Scheduled for completion and inauguration by the end of March 2011, the project had an estimated construction period of one year.

=== Completion and inauguration ===
Near completion by early 2014, the new Palais de Justice was visited on 4 March by European Commissioner for Development Andris Piebalgs, who presented a ceremonial golden key to Justice Minister Wivine Mumba Matipa. The pale-yellow, angular four-storey building contained approximately 50 offices, 10 conference rooms and underground parking. It was intended to house several judicial institutions, including the Constitutional Court, the Council of State, the Court of Cassation, the High Military Court and the Office of the Prosecutor General, alongside their associated prosecution services. The project cost was estimated at €4.3 million.

Even though the main construction work had been completed, outstanding finishing work delayed the building's formal handover until 20 February 2015, when president Kabila inaugurated it at a ceremony attended by government officials and other dignitaries. The palace was built by Congolese contractor Safricas with reported EU funding of around €3 million. During the opening ceremony, Jean-Michel Dumond, Head of the European Union Delegation in the DRC, explained that the EU's support for the country's justice system was not limited to the construction of the building and that the EU had invested more than €100 million in different programmes to support justice, improve governance, and strengthen judicial reforms.

== Palais de Justice redevelopment projects ==
Renovated independently of the newer judicial complex, the original Palais de Justice underwent refurbishment alongside the latter's construction between 2010 and 2015. According to Radio Okapi, the restored building was intended to house the offices of the Minister of Justice and Keeper of the Seals, as well as the Court of Cassation. A major renovation, reported by Totaleinfo.cd in October 2025, was entrusted to Milvest to modernise the facilities and improve working conditions for judicial personnel and access for the public; the project reportedly employed durable construction materials and techniques intended to extend the building's lifespan to approximately a century.

In January 2022, work officially began on plans for another Palais de Justice in Kinshasa, this time intended for the administrative courts. On 29 January, Minister of State for Justice Rose Mutombo Kiese laid the foundation stone at the former Kasa-Vubu cemetery (Cimetière de Kasa-Vubu), where the new building was to be constructed. The project was different from the earlier construction in Gombe because it was meant specifically for the administrative branch of the judiciary. The site is located on Saio Avenue in Kasa-Vubu, opposite Maman Poto Bakery (Boulangerie Maman Poto). It covers slightly more than one hectare and had been cleared before the start of construction. The building would have six floors above ground and a basement parking area, giving it seven levels in total. Its overall floor area was expected to be around 10,000 square metres. However, there was a difference between the reports, as Ouragan.cd described it as having five storeys, while Beto.cd reported six above-ground floors and one basement level. The building was planned to include more than 120 offices and several courtrooms. Its main purpose was to provide a headquarters for the Council of State and suitable working space for Kinshasa's administrative courts and tribunals.

Construction was assigned to the Italian company GIMACO and was expected to last 18 months, after which the building would be checked before the official handover.
