= Aminata Namasia =

Congolese politician, Minister of State in charge of Regional Planning

Aminata Namasia Bazego

Deputy Minister of Primary, Secondary and Technical Education of the Democratic Republic of the Congo
- Incumbent
- Assumed office April 26, 2021
- President: Félix Tshisekedi
- Prime Minister: Jean-Michel Sama Lukonde
- Majority: Union Sacrée de la Nation (USN)

Founder of Aminata Namasia Foundation
- Incumbent
- Assumed office 2016

Member of the Democratic Republic of the Congo Parliament
- In office December 30, 2018 – April 26, 2021

Personal details
- Born: March 10, 1993 (age 33) Dingila, Bas-Uélé, DRC
- Party: Congolese Party for Development (Parti Congolais pour le développement (PCD))
- Education: Protestant University in the Congo
- Occupation: Politician

Aminata Namasia Bazego (born March 10, 1993, in Dingila) is a politician and member of the Democratic Republic of the Congo Parliament, appointed Deputy Minister of Primary, Secondary and Technical Education since April 2021.

== Biography ==
=== Education ===
Aminata Namasia was born on March 10, 1993, in Dingila in the province of Bas-Uélé in the Democratic Republic of the Congo. She did her primary studies at the Golpas School Complex. In 2017, she obtained a diploma in monetary economics from the faculty of business administration and economics of the Protestant University in the Congo (UPC).

=== Political career ===
Member of the Congolese Development Party, Aminata Namasia was elected national deputy in the constituency of Bambesa, in the province of Bas-Uélé, during the legislative elections of December 30, 2018 in the Democratic Republic of the Congo.

On December 8, 2020, following the fall of the Office of the National Assembly, in accordance with its internal regulations, the oldest deputy, accompanied by two youngest members of Parliament, took over the management of the Office, with the mission of organizing and electing a new bureau. Aminata Namasia, the youngest sitting member of the lower house of the Congolese parliament alongside Gael Bussa, is appointed quaestor of the National Assembly.

On April 12, 2021, she was appointed National Deputy Minister of Primary, Secondary and Technical Education in the Democratic Republic of the Congo under Jean-Michel Sama Lukonde's cabinet.

=== Aminata Namasia Foundation ===
Aminata Namasia is the founder of a foundation, named after her name, and whose head office is located in the territory of Bambesa in the northeast of the Democratic Republic of the Congo. Created in 2016, the foundation's field of action is the education of young girls, the promotion of school cafeterias, the empowerment of women and the promotion of sport in rural areas.

== See also ==
- Lukonde cabinet
- Parliament of the Democratic Republic of the Congo
