= Daniel Mukoko Samba =

Democratic Republic of the Congo politician

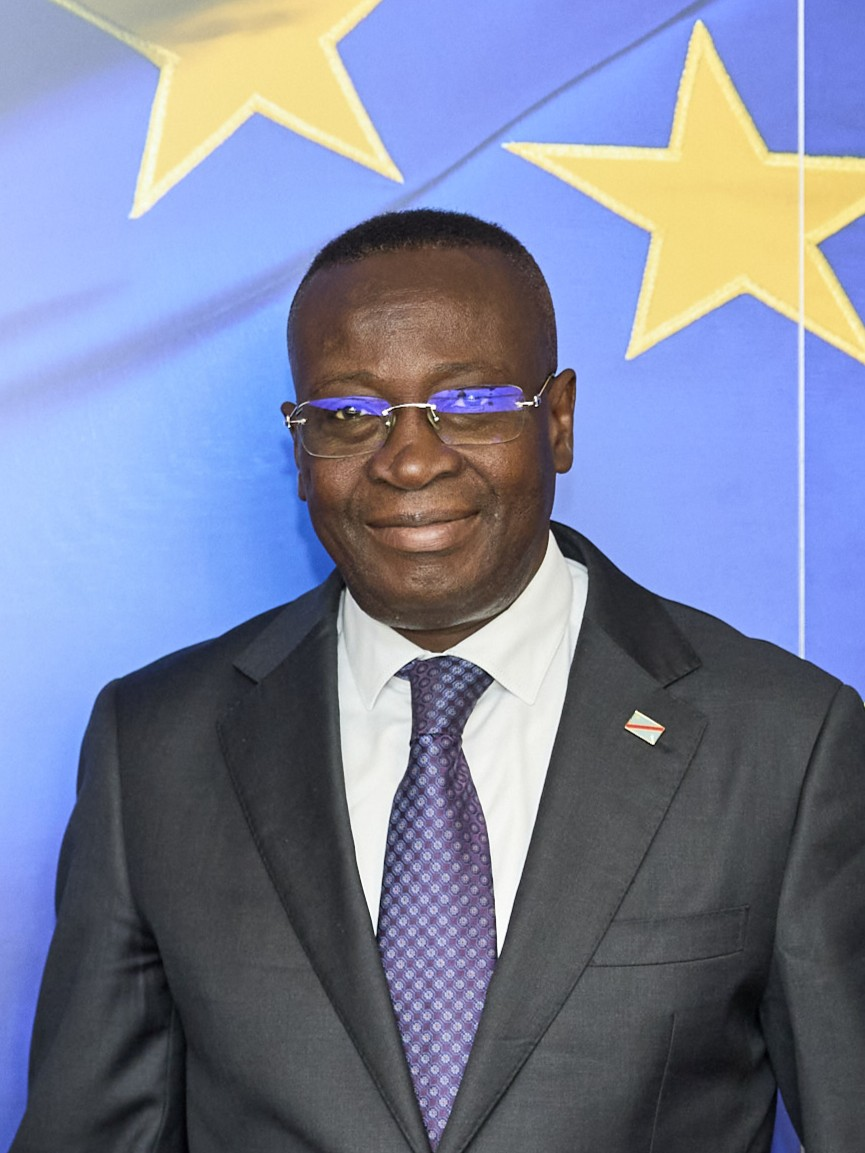
- Samba in 2026

Deputy Prime Minister Minister of the National Economy
- Incumbent
- Assumed office 13 June 2024
- President: Félix Tshisekedi
- Prime Minister: Judith Suminwa Tuluka
- Preceded by: Eustache Mubembe (interim)

Deputy Prime Minister Minister of the Budget
- In office 9 May 2012 – 8 December 2014
- President: Joseph Kabila
- Prime Minister: Matata Ponyo Mapon
- Succeeded by: Michel Bongongo

Personal details
- Born: 15 May 1959 (age 67) Thysville, Belgian Congo (now Mbanza-Ngungu, DR Congo)
- Occupation: Economist, university professor, politician

Daniel Mukoko Samba is a politician from the Democratic Republic of the Congo. He serves as the Deputy Prime Minister under President Joseph Kabila. He also serves as Minister of the Budget.

== Biography ==
Daniel Mukoko Samba was born in Mbanza-Ngungu, RDC on May 15, 1959. He received a B.A. in Economics from the University of Kinshasa in 1983, a master's degree in Economics from Oita University in Japan in 1990, and a PhD in Economics from the University of Tsukuba in Japan in 1993.

For sixteen years, he taught as a university professor at the University of Kinshasa, Kongo University and Aichi University of Education in Japan. He also worked for the United Nations for five years.

== Bibliography ==
- Estimation des effets spécifiques sur la demande de logement à Kinshasa par le modèle à prix hédonique (2004)
- Resilience of an African Giant: Boosting Growth and Development in the Democratic Republic of Congo (co-written with Johannes Herderschee, Kai-alexander Kaiser, World Bank, 2011)
- Guérir le Congo du mal Zaïrois ( French edition), Mukoko Samba, Daniel - amazon.com, https://www.amazon.com/Gu%C3%A9rir-Congo-mal-za%C3%AFrois-French/dp/2806106109/ref=nodl_?dplnkId=d48e43c6-a403-4e73-bfd1-62f225e12339,
