= Guy Kabombo Muadiamvita =

Congolese politician

Deputy Prime Minister Minister of National Defence and Veterans' Affairs
- Incumbent
- Assumed office 12 June 2024
- President: Félix Tshisekedi
- Prime Minister: Judith Suminwa
- Preceded by: Jean-Pierre Bemba

Member of the National Assembly from Tshilenge
- Incumbent
- Assumed office 12 February 2024

Director General of the Official Journal of the DRC
- Incumbent
- Assumed office 6 December 2019
- Preceded by: Louis Marie Walle Lufungula

Personal details
- Born: 14 May 1964 (age 62) Mbuji-Mayi, Kasaï-Oriental, Congo-Léopoldville
- Party: Union for Democracy and Social Progress
- Education: University of Kinshasa
- Occupation: Politician

Guy Kabombo Muadiamvitaet Mireille Malengele Kuzoma (born 14 May 1964) is a Congolese politician who serves as the incumbent Deputy Prime Minister of Defense, since 12 June 2024. He served as the director general of the Official Journal of the Democratic Republic of the Congo, prior to his current position.

== Early life and education ==
Guy Kabombo Muadiamvita was born 14 May 1964 in Mbuji-Mayi, Kasaï-Oriental.

He attended primary and secondary school in Mwene-Ditu. He obtained a Bachelor's degree in Health Sciences from the l'Institut Facultaire de Développement (IFAD). He has an advanced studies diploma (DEA) in public law from the University of Kinshasa. He has some medical training from l'Institut de formation en soins infirmiers (IFSI) Tenon Débrousse (AP-HP) in Paris.

== Political career ==
In his youth he served as a party activist from Mwene-Ditu with the Union for Democracy and Social Progress (UDPS). He helped popularise the influential December 1980 Lettre des 13 parlementaires (Letter of the 13 parliamentarians) which denounced the dictatorship of Mobutu Sese Seko. He served as the youth mobilization leader and president of UDPS party in France.

=== National Assembly ===
He was elected to the National Assembly in the 2011 Democratic Republic of the Congo parliamentary election for the Mwene-Ditu district. Since Étienne Tshisekedi objected to the results of the election, he did not take his seat.

He was elected again to the National Assembly in the 2023 Democratic Republic of the Congo general election for the Tshilenge district in Kasaï-Oriental. He took office on 12 February 2024. He is reported to be a friend and confidant of Félix Tshisekedi.

=== Official Journal of the DRC ===
On 21 November 2019 he was made the acting Director General of the Official Journal of the Democratic Republic of the Congo (JORDC). On 6 December 2019, his appointment was made official.

=== Defense minister ===
He was appointed to the defense minister position on 28 May 2024 as part of the Suminwa cabinet. He succeeds Jean-Pierre Bemba who was shuffled into the transportation minister position. His appointment comes shortly after the 2024 coup attempt and during the ongoing hostilities facing the Rwandan-backed M23 rebels.

== Personal life ==
He is married with five children.
