= Aimé Ngoy Mukena =

Congolese politician (died 2022)

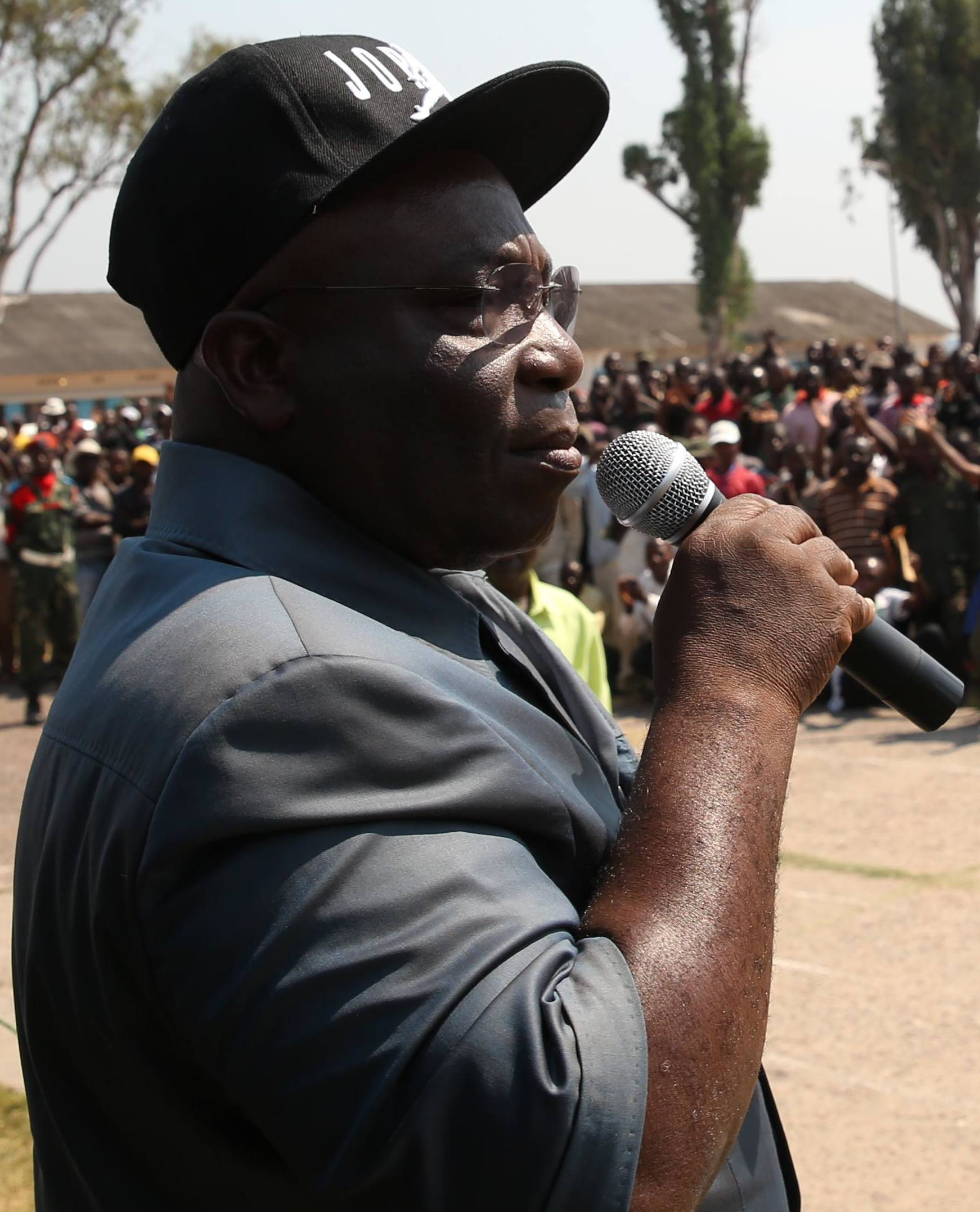

Minister of Defence (Democratic Republic of the Congo)
- In office 6 September 2019 – 26 April 2021
- President: Félix Antoine Tshisekedi Tshilombo
- Prime Minister: Matata Ponyo Mapon
- Preceded by: Michel Bongongo

Member of Parliament of the National Assembly (Democratic Republic of the Congo)
- In office 2019–2022

Ministry of Hydrocarbons
- In office 26 September 2015 – 6 September 2019
- President: Joseph Kabila
- Prime Minister: Matata Ponyo Mapon; Samy Badibanga; Bruno Tshibala
- Preceded by: Crispin Atama Atabe

Minister of Defence (Democratic Republic of the Congo)
- In office 7 December 2014 – 14 November 2015
- President: Joseph Kabila
- Prime Minister: Matata Ponyo Mapon
- Preceded by: Alexandre Luba Ntambo

Board Member at Société nationale des chemins de fer du Congo
- In office 2011–2013

Member of Parliament of National Assembly (Democratic Republic of the Congo)
- In office 2006–2011

Governor of Katanga Province
- In office 2001–2004
- Preceded by: Augustin Katumba Mwanke
- Succeeded by: Kisula Ngoy

Chairman of the Board of Directors of Régie des Voies Aériennes de la République Démocratique du Congo
- In office 2001–2002

Member of Parliament of National Assembly (Democratic Republic of the Congo)
- In office 2000–2003

Personal details
- Died: 22 May 2022 Lubumbashi
- Party: People's Party for Reconstruction and Democracy
- Education: University of Lausanne
- Profession: Professor of political philosophy, politician
- Website: hydrocarbures.gouv.cd

Aimé Ngoy Mukena (28 April 1954 – 22 May 2022) was a political figure from the Democratic Republic of the Congo who has served as Minister of Petroleum and Gas since 26 September 2015. He previously served as Minister of Defence and Veterans' Affairs under President Joseph Kabila. He was a founding member of the People's Party for Reconstruction and Democracy (PPRD), one of the most influential political parties in the Congo where he served as its Executive Secretary in charge of interior and decentralization.

Mukena studied Political Philosophy at the University of Lausanne, Ethics, Theology and Human Resources Management at the University of Geneva, and African Linguistics at ISP Lubumbashi. His past offices include Governor of Katanga (2001–2004), member of the national assembly (2006–2011), member of the board of directors at SNCC (2011). He was professor of Political Philosophy at the University of Lubumbashi in the Democratic Republic of Congo. A professor by profession, Mukena has published a number of academic books and journal articles on political economy and philosophy. He is also known as one of the political heavyweights from the Southern province of Katanga.

== Early life and education ==
Aimé Ngoy Mukena was born in Lubumbashi, capital of Katanga province. He received a PhD in Political Philosophy from the University of Lausanne in 1999, and a Post-graduate degree in Theology, Ethics and Human Resources Management at the University of Geneva. He also received a bachelor's degree in philosophy and African linguistics at ISP-Lubumbashi.

== Career ==
Mukena worked successively at Gécamines, a mining company located in the Southern province of Katanga, the Fondation des Oliviers, the University of Lausanne and the Permanent Mission of the Democratic Republic of Congo to Geneva. Upon his return to the Congo, he worked as Member of the Constituent and Legislative Assembly in the Transitional Parliament in 2000 and later worked as chairman of the board of directors of the Régie des Voies Aériennes de la République Démocratique du Congo (RVA). Between 2001 and 2004, Mukena served as governor of the Province of Katanga. In the 2006 general elections, he was elected member of the Congolese National assembly for a five-year term, ending in 2011. In September 2011, he was appointed member of the board of directors of the Société nationale des Chemins de fer du Congo. On 8 December 2014, he was appointed Minister of Defense and Veterans affairs in the new government. Following the reshuffling of the Government, Mukena was given the Petroleum and Gas portfolio. Aside from his political career, he also taught philosophy and history of political and economic thought at the University of Lubumbashi.

== Published work ==
- La dimension politique et économique de la " Révolution de la modernité " in Frontières et gouvernance sécuritaire pour le développement économique de la République Démocratique du Congo. L'Harmattan 2013.
- Parcours de l'histoire de la philosophie négro-africaine : A l'usage des étudiants de deuxième graduat en Philosophie
- Tout arrive à tous et autre nouvelles. Lubumbashi : Editions pensées du sud, [2002]
- La critique du sens de l'Homme dans l'économisme occidental totalitaire au départ de la pensée de L.S. Senghor, 2000
- Monseigneur Fariala, ou, Le salaire du péché : (drame en cinq tableaux), 2002
- Première épître aux enfants de mon village : sur le double événement du mois de mai, 2004
- Ma vision du Katanga : un nouveau regard sur une cité natale à rebâtir
- L'hégémonie du peuple et la fin des idéologies de domination : dialogues sur la Cité, 2000
- " Senghor : l'homme et le penseur enveloppent une énigme ", in Mbegu n°31, juin 2003, Lubumbashi, Centre de Recherche et d'Animation Pédagogique, 2003, p. 27
