= Jean Mukuala Bateke =

Jean Mukuala Bateke is the secretary general of the senate of the Democratic Republic of the Congo.
