= Ministry of Hydrocarbons =

Government ministry of the Democratic Republic of the Congo

Democratic Republic of the Congo Ministry of Hydrocarbons
Department overview
- Jurisdiction: Democratic Republic of the Congo
- Headquarters: Kinshasa
- Minister responsible: Aime Ngoy Mukena
- Website: www.hydrocarbures.gouv.cd

The Ministry of Hydrocarbons (MoH) is a ministry of the Government of the Democratic Republic of the Congo. It is responsible for the exploration, production, refining, distribution, marketing, import, export, and conservation of petroleum, natural gas, petroleum products, and liquefied natural gas in the Democratic Republic of Congo. It also oversees the safety and other regulations that relate to the exportation and importation of the products into the country. As part of its activities, the department manages the upstream, midstream and downstream in the Congo.

The Ministry is headed by the cabinet Minister Aime Ngoy Mukena, as well as a secretary general who is in charge of administrative duties and procedures relating to the ministry.

== Areas of work allocated to the Ministry ==
- Managing the exploration and exploitation of petroleum resources, including natural gas.
- Overseeing the production, supply distribution, marketing and pricing of petroleum including natural gas and petroleum products.
- Oil refineries.
- Planning, development and control of, and assistance to all industries dealt with by the Ministry.
- Planning and elaboration of oil policies, regulatory and legal framework of petroleum and gas.
- All attached or subordinate offices or other organisations concerned with any of the subject specified in this list.
- Planning, development and regulation of oilfield services.

== Cabinet Ministers ==
- Simplice Onanga - April 2026 - present
- Acacia Bandubola Mbongo - 2025 - April 2026
- Didier Budimbu - April 2022 – June 2024
- Aime Ngoy Mukena - 2015–2022
- Crispin Atama Tabe - 2012 - 2015
- Martin Kabwelulu - 2011 - 2012
- Célestin Mbuyu Kabango - 2008 - 2011
- René Isekemanga Nkenka - 2008
- Lambert Mende - 2007 - 2008
