= Frédéric Kibassa Maliba =

Congolese politician (1939–2003)

Frédéric Kibassa Maliba Masele
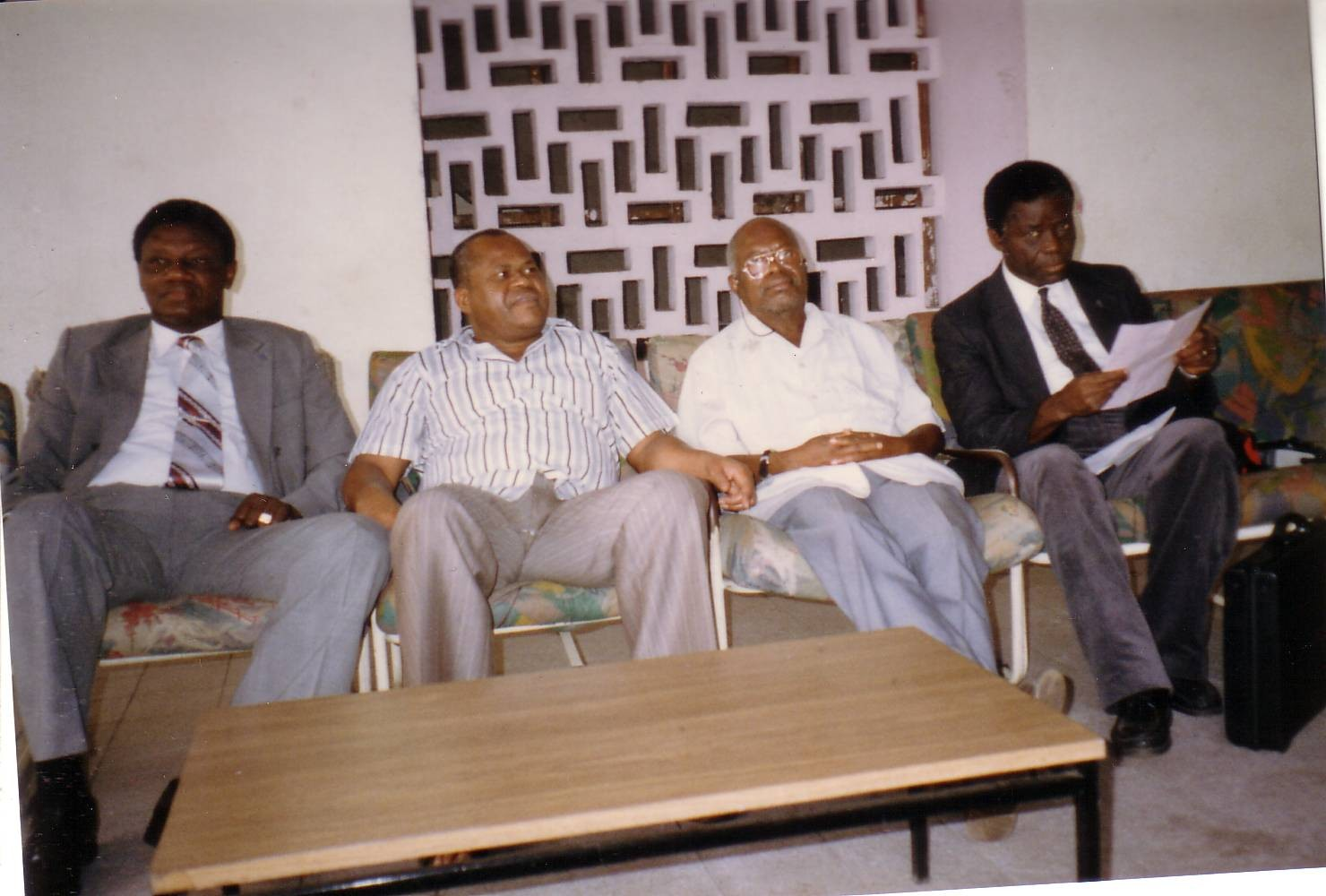

Deputy Minister of Mines
- In office 1997–1998

Minister of Mines
- In office 1998–2000

Minister of Youth and Sports
- In office 1987–?

Personal details
- Born: 28 December 1939 Élisabethville, Belgian Congo (now: Lubumbashi, D.R. Congo)
- Died: 5 April 2003 (aged 63) Brussels, Belgium
- Children: Augustin Kibassa (son)

Frédéric Kibassa Maliba (28 December 1939 – 5 April 2003) was a politician in the Democratic Republic of the Congo (DRC). Kibassa held the positions of Deputy Minister of Mines and then Minister of Mines in the Laurent-Désiré Kabila government. He was accused of misappropriating funds in June 2000, while he was Minister of Mines.

== Background ==
Kibassa was born on 28 December 1939 near Lubumbashi in Katanga Province. He attended primary and secondary schools in his hometown. He then attended the University of Congo, still in Lubumbashi. His studies were in preparation for a diplomatic career. From 1965 until 1966 he was a provincial minister of Education. He was elected Deputy of Lubumbashi in 1970 and again in 1975. In 1979 he was appointed State Commissioner for Sports and Leisure.

== Mobutu regime ==
In November 1980, Kibassa was among thirteen members of parliament who signed an "open letter to the president of the republic", a ten-point document cataloging corruption and abuse of power in the regime, and calling for legalization of a second political party. The thirteen signatories were arrested and stripped of their parliamentary seats. He was a founding member of the Union for Democracy and Social Progress (Union pour la démocratie et le progrès social, UDPS) in 1982, and the party's first President. While president of the UDPS, in 1987 he joined the government of President Mobutu Sese Seko. He was appointed Minister of Youth and Sports.

In 1991 the UDPS split into two factions. The UDPS-Orthodoxe was led by Etienne Tshisekedi and the UDPS-Legale by Kibassa Maliba. In October 1991 Kibassa Maliba was serving as chairman of the Union Sacrée de l'Opposition Radicale (USOR), which was formed in 1991 as a coalition of opposition groups that included the UDPS. In January 1993 troops from the elite Division spéciale présidentielle made a rocket attack on Kibassa's family home. His 28-year-old son, Berthos, was killed and other family members badly injured. Tshisekedi was the prime minister of the country at the time. In June 1994 soldiers fired on people gathered in front of Kibassa Maliba's home. As of 1994 he was still president of USOR and leader of the main opposition UDPS.

== Kabila regime ==
At the end of the First Congo War, in May 1997 Mobutu fled into exile and Laurent-Désiré Kabila took power. Kabila appointed Kibassa Deputy Minister of Mines in November 1997. At the time, Kibassa was leader of the UDPS/Kibassa. This was, according to people close to Tshisekedi, one of the parties recognized by the Kabila government, reportedly in order to reduce the stature of the UDPS/Tshisekedi faction. A spokesman for Tshisekedi's faction falsely accused Kibassa's party of being "a branch of [Kabila's] AFDL/CPP State Party".

In 1998, the Prospectors and Developers Association of Canada (PDAC) and Canada's Department of Foreign Affairs and International Trade co-sponsored, under the organisation of Joe Clark, a visit by Kibassa as DRC Minister of Mines for meetings with mining companies at the PDAC's annual convention in Toronto. During his Canada mission, Kibassa Maliba was also scheduled to meet with Canadian NGOs at Montreal offices of the Canadian engineering firm SNC Lavalin. However, this meeting was reportedly canceled by Canada's Foreign Affairs department following protests made by dozens of representatives from a banned Congolese opposition party, the UDPS/Tshisekedi (Union for Democracy and Social Progress/Tshisekedi).

Kibassa died from a heart attack in Brussels on 5 April 2003, following a long illness. In recognition to his contribution to the political and social arena of the Democratic Republic of Congo, the second largest soccer stadium was named after him. TP Mazembe plays their domestic game in Stadium Frederic Kibassa Maliba.
