= Daniel Aselo =

Politician of the Democratic Republic of the Congo

Daniel Asselo Okito Wankoy is a politician from the Democratic Republic of the Congo. He was Minister of the Interior and Security, Decentralization, and Customary Affairs in the first Lukonde cabinet (April 2021 – March 2023). He was born in Lodja in the province of Sankuru.
