= Mathilde Muhindo =

Congolese human rights activist

Mathilde Muhindo Mwamini

Director of the Olame Centre

DRC Parliament Member

Personal details
- Born: c. 1954 (age 71–72) Democratic Republic of the Congo
- Awards: Alison Des Forges Award for Extraordinary Activism

Mathilde Muhindo Mwamini (born c. 1954) was the Director of the Olame Centre, located in eastern Bukavu in the Democratic Republic of the Congo. She is a former member of the Parliament in the Democratic Republic of Congo. She was awarded the Human Rights Watch's Alison Des Forges Award for Extraordinary Activism. She and her organisation fight against discrimination and sexual violence against women.
