= Chikez Diemu =

Democratic Republic of the Congo politician

Minister of Defense and Veterans' Affairs
- In office 6 Feb 2007 – October 2008
- President: Antoine Gizenga
- Succeeded by: Charles Mwando Nsimba

Personal details
- Born: Ghislain Chikez Diemu
- Party: People's Party for Reconstruction and Democracy

Ghislain Chikez (also known as Tshikez) Diemu is a politician in the Democratic Republic of the Congo, and a member of the People's Party for Reconstruction and Democracy (PPRD), of which he was previously Secretary General. He joined the Alliance of Democratic Forces for the Liberation of Congo (AFDL) in 1997 and was appointed Vice-Minister of the Interior by Joseph Kabila, and later on, Secretary General of the PPRD.

He was also previously Vice-Governor of Katanga province for economic affairs.

Starting 6 February 2007, he served as Minister of Defense and Veterans' Affairs (Anciens Combattants), supervising the FARDC, in the government of Antoine Gizenga. However President Kabila distrusts the official military structure in Kinshasa and prefers to give instructions directly to the commanders in the east. He was replaced by another politician, Charles Mwando Nsimba in October 2008.
