= Senate (Democratic Republic of the Congo) =

Upper house of the Democratic Republic of the Congo

Coordinates: 4.3322°S 15.3031°E

Senate Sénat

Type
- Type: Upper house None (1967–2003) Upper house (1960–1967)

History
- Founded: 1960 (original) 2003 (re-established)

Leadership
- President: Sama Lukonde, ACO since 12 August 2024

Structure
- Seats: 109 (including one senator for life)
- Length of term: 5 years

Elections
- Voting system: Indirect election
- Last election: 29 April, 24 and 26 May 2024, 2 April 2025
- Next election: June 2029

Meeting place
- Sénat; Palais du Peuple; Kinshasa

Website
- Official website

The Senate (French: Sénat) is the upper house of the Parliament of the Democratic Republic of the Congo. The senate was established in 1960, abolished in 1967 and re-established in 2003.

During the transition period in the Democratic Republic of the Congo (2003–2006), the Senate, aside from its legislative role, also had the task of drafting the country's new constitution. This task came to fruition with the adoption of the draft in Parliament in May 2005, and its approval by the Congolese people, in a successful democratic referendum on 18 and 19 December 2005.

The current president of the Senate is Sama Lukonde, elected in 12 August 2024. The secretary general is Jean Mukuala Bateke. The most recent Senate was sworn in on January 28, 2019.

== Election ==
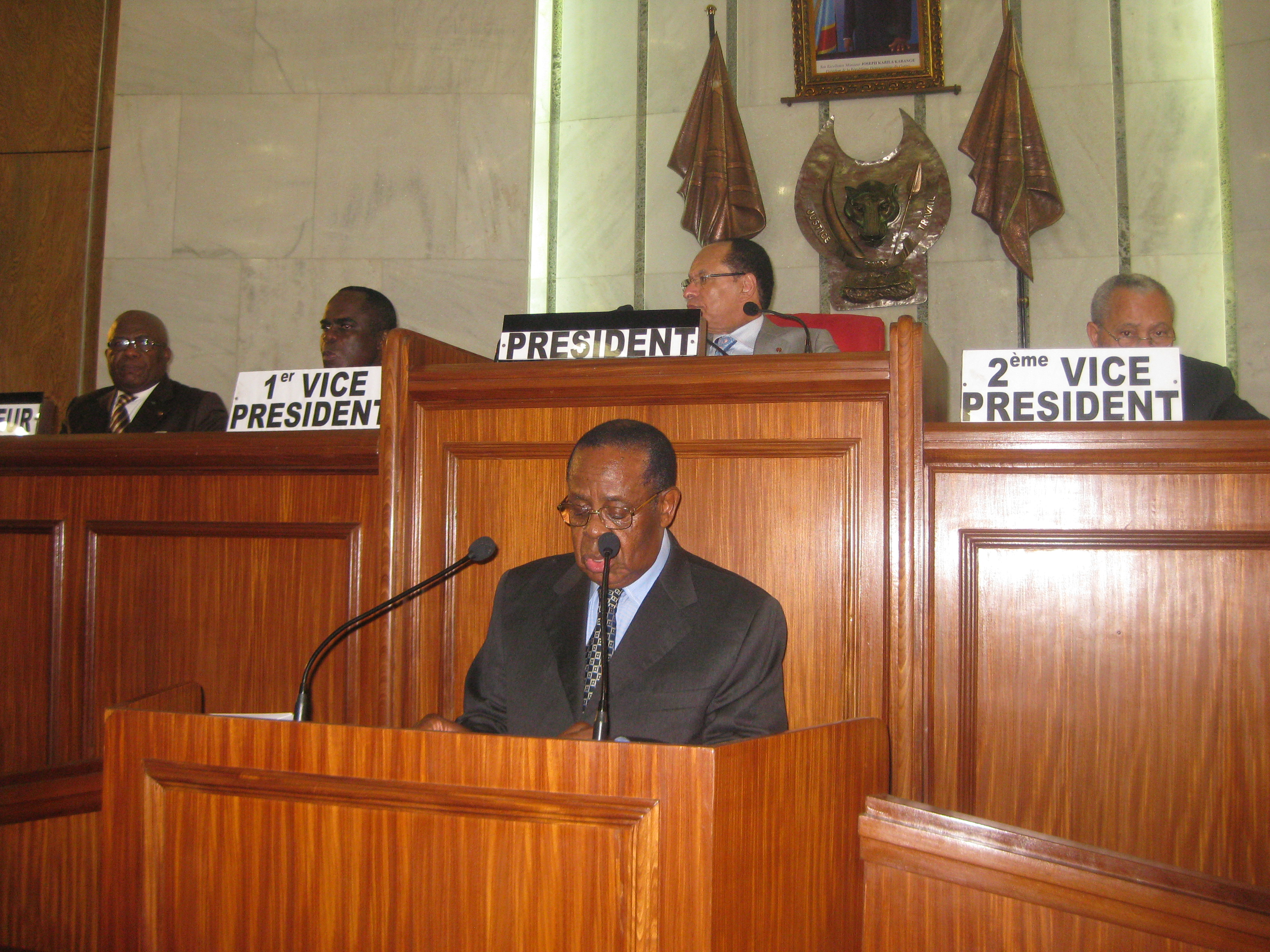
Charles Mwando Nsimba addressing the Senate with Léon Kengo presiding, 2009

Senators were elected under the new constitution on 19 January 2007 by the provincial parliaments of their respective provinces. Members of the Senate are indirectly elected by the Provincial Assemblies. Each of the 25 provinces proper elects four senators and the city-province of Kinshasa elects eight. Elected senators serve five year terms. Former presidents may sit as senators for life.

== Transitional Senate ==
Composition of the Transitional Senate of the Democratic Republic of the Congo
	Seats
Movement for the Liberation of Congo (Mouvement pour la Liberation du Congo)	22
Government	22
Political opposition	22
Congolese Rally for Democracy (Rassemblement Congolais pour la Democratie)	21
Civil Society	21
Maï-Maï	4
Congolese Rally for Democracy/Kisangani Liberation Movement (Rassemblement des Congolais pour la Démocratie/ Kisangani Mouvement de Libération)	3
Rally of Congolese for Democracy-National (Rassemblement des Congolais pour la Démocratie – National)	1
Total	120

== List of senators ==
Members of the 2019–2023 Senate
Province	Senator	Party
Bas-Uélé	Carole Agito Amela	Independent
Bas-Uélé	Papy Bazego Tebuseli	MLC
Bas-Uélé	George Erick Makangu	Independent
Bas-Uélé	Nestor Ngbonda Dauly	Independent
Équateur	Richard Bampunga Ndombo Benteke	RIA
Équateur	José Endungo Bononge	G7
Équateur	Tristan Etumba Boyengo	ACO
Équateur	Edouard Mokolo Wa Pombo	Independent
Haut-Katanga	Bijoux Goya Kitenge	Independent
Haut-Katanga	Miche Kanyimbu Shindany	Independent
Haut-Katanga	Francine Muyumba Furaha	Independent
Haut-Katanga	Célestin Pande Kapopo	PPRD
Haut-Lomami	Isabelle Kabamba Wa Umba	Movement for the Integrity of the People
Haut-Lomami	Augustin Kapya Ntumba	Alternative Action for Well-being and Change
Haut-Lomami	Ilunga Kitombolwe	PPRD
Haut-Lomami	Irène Kunda Kisenga	FCC
Haut-Uélé	Jean Bakomito Gambu	Independent
Haut-Uélé	Jean Pierre Batumoko Afozunde	Alliance of Actors for Good Governance of Congo
Haut-Uélé	Dieudonnette Mungwananjo Boyekombo	Alliance of Democrats for Renewal and Progress
Haut-Uélé	Norbert Samaki Anidutini	FCC
Ituri	Médard Autsai Asenga	PPRD
Ituri	John Tibasima Mbongemu Ateenyi	Alternative Action for Well-being and Change
Ituri	Alphonse Ukeci Muswa Urundi	Alliance for Democratic Alternative
Ituri	Pierrot Uweka Ukaba	PPRD
Kasaï	Evariste Boshab Mabudi	Independent
Kasaï	Victorine Lwese Bakuamoyo	Independent
Kasaï	John Muyamba Ngov	PPRD
Kasaï	Kalala Nkole Kally	Alliance of the Democratic Forces of Congo and Allies
Kasaï-Central	Remy Bwanoko Kalombo	Independent
Kasaï-Central	Dénis Kambayi Cimbumbu	PPRD
Kasaï-Central	Ida Kamonji Nasserwa	PPRD
Kasaï-Central	Pauline Monalux Ml Mona Kayoko	PPRD
Kasaï-Oriental	Samy Badibanga Ntita	Progressistes
Kasaï-Oriental	Auguy Ilunga Civuila	RDT
Kasaï-Oriental	Odette Mbuyi Ngoy	PPRD
Kasaï-Oriental	Eddy Mundela Kanku	UDPS/Tshisekedi
Kinshasa	Valentin Gerengo N'vene	MLC
Kinshasa	Patrick Lubala Birhashirwa	Alliance of Democrats for Renewal and Progress
Kinshasa	Didier Molisho Sadi	MCR
Kinshasa	Didier Mumengi Tshukudi	Independent
Kinshasa	Adonis Ngambani Ngovoli	Independent
Kinshasa	Eric Rubuye Hakizimwami	ACO
Kinshasa	Augustin Salabia Isambakana	Alternative Action for Well-being and Change
Kinshasa	Ange Ziaka Angelani	ACO
Kongo Central	Pamphile Badu Wa Badu	Independent
Kongo Central	Rolly Lelo Nzazi	Independent
Kongo Central	Roger Muaka Muaka	ACO
Kongo Central	Nefertiti Ngudianza Bayokisa Kisula	ACO
Kwango	Nathalie Bul'an'sung Sanata	ACO
Kwango	André Kimbuta Yango	PPRD
Kwango	Colette Lukamata Nkulu	Unified Lumumbist Party
Kwango	Aimé Patience Mangyadi Bifulu	Alternative Action for Well-being and Change
Kwilu	Sacré Inioki Lamfel	Alliance for the Future
Kwilu	Marie-Josée Sona Kamitatu	G7
Kwilu	Ida Kidima Nzumba	Independent
Kwilu	Jean-Philibert Mabaya Gizi Amine	Rainbow of Congo
Lomami	Micheline Kabedi Kazadi	Independent
Lomami	Gabriel Kazadi Ngoy	PPRD
Lomami	Dieudonné Kazadi Nyembwe	PPRD
Lomami	Hippolyte Mutombo Mbwebwe	Action of Allies to Improve Living Conditions for the Congolese
Lualaba	Ghislain Chikez Diemu	PPRD
Lualaba	Kaumba Lufunda	Movement for the Integrity of the People
Lualaba	Laurent Muzangisa Mutalenu	PPRD
Lualaba	Godefroid Mwenda Bantu Munongo	Independent
Mai-Ndombe	Thalie Dasyo Mokfe	Independent
Mai-Ndombe	Célestin James Mokelo Mumba Kebeke	PPRD
Mai-Ndombe	Fidèle Mpayi Mumpele	PPRD
Mai-Ndombe	Frederick Mwamfwa Bopali	CPPR
Maniema	Jean Baptiste Assumani Amani	People's Party for Peace and Democracy
Maniema	Jérôme Bikenge Musimbi	Action of Allies to Improve Living Conditions for the Congolese
Maniema	Matata Ponyo Mapon	Independent
Maniema	Alexis Thambwe Mwamba	Independent
Mongala	Denise Bolingo Botakile	Alliance for the Future
Mongala	Abdoul Lianza Mole	Independent
Mongala	Louis Mbonga Magalu-Engwanda	Alliance of the Democratic Forces of Congo and Allies
Mongala	Jean de dieu Moleka Liambi	Independent
Nord-Ubangi	Basile Bale Bila	MLC
Nord-Ubangi	Philémon Kpama Baramoto Kapa	Independent
Nord-Ubangi	Giala Mobutu	ZAIRE
Nord-Ubangi	Jean-Pierre Zagbalafio Angala	ATD
North Kivu	Pierre Kabanda Kayobotsi	BUREC
North Kivu	Jean-Pierre Kibaya Munembwe	AARC
North Kivu	Jean Mukinti Baumbilia	Social Movement for Renewal
North Kivu	Célestin Vunabandi Kanyamihigo	Independent
Sankuru	Moise Ekanga Lushyma	Independent
Sankuru	Emile Omba Djunga Kasongo	Independent
Sankuru	Leonard She Okitundu Lundula	Independent
Sankuru	Berthold Ulungu Ekunda Lutaka	CCU
South Kivu	Modeste Bahati Lukwembo	Alliance of the Democratic Forces of Congo and Allies
South Kivu	Léon Mamboleo Mughuba Itundamilamba	Union for the Congolese Nation
South Kivu	Mapenzi Maneno	G7
South Kivu	Stéphane Miruho Mugorozi	PPRD
Sud-Ubangi	Francoise Bemba Ndokwa	MLC
Sud-Ubangi	Norbert Imana Mbule	CDER
Sud-Ubangi	José Makila Sumanda	ATD
Sud-Ubangi	Sanguma Temongonde Mossai	Independent
Tanganyika	Isidore Kabwe Mwehu Longo	Alternative Action for Well-being and Change
Tanganyika	Vicky Katumwa Mukalay	Alliance of the Democratic Forces of Congo and Allies
Tanganyika	Célestine Hortense Mukalay Kionde	PPRD
Tanganyika	Christine Mwando Katempa	G7
Tshopo	James Bayukita Makula	Independent
Tshopo	Mike Mosisi Makota	Alliance of the Democratic Forces of Congo and Allies
Tshopo	Laddy Yangotikala Senga	Independent
Tshopo	Anita Zeta Bamanyisa	FNSD
Tshuapa	Lydie Baopoko Bahike	Independent
Tshuapa	Cathy Botema Mboyo	Independent
Tshuapa	Reagan Ilanga Bakonga	Independent
Tshuapa	Fidèle Likinda Bolom'elenge	PPRD

== See also ==
- 2024 Democratic Republic of the Congo Senate election
- List of presidents of the Senate of the Democratic Republic of the Congo
- Parliament of the Democratic Republic of the Congo
