= Muhindo Nzangi =

Congolese politician

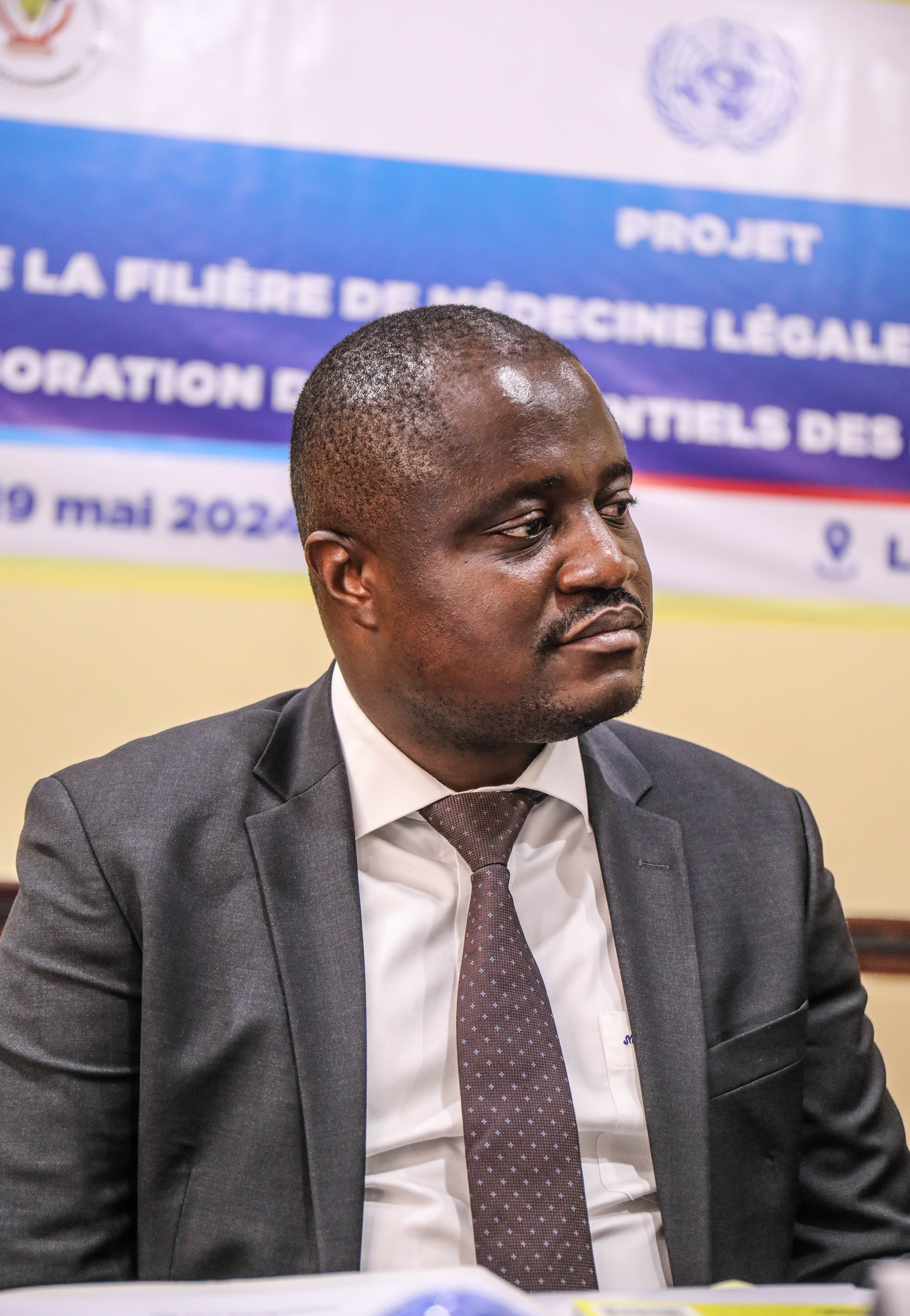

Minister of State Minister of Rural Development
- Incumbent
- Assumed office June 13, 2024
- President: Félix Tshisekedi
- Prime Minister: Judith Suminwa
- Preceded by: François Rubota

Minister of Higher and University Education
- In office April 12, 2021 – June 13, 2024
- President: Félix Tshisekedi
- Prime Minister: Sama Lukonde
- Preceded by: Thomas Luhaka
- Succeeded by: Marie-Thérèse Sombo

Deputy in the National Assembly for Butembo
- In office November 28, 2011 – December 20, 2023

Personal details
- Born: Muhindo Nzangi Butondo; November 11, 1980 (age 45) Kyavinyonge, Beni Territory, North Kivu, Democratic Republic of the Congo
- Party: Together for the Republic (2018-2022); VAPR (2022-present)

Muhingo Nzangi Butondo is a Congolese politician who is currently serving as the Congolese Minister of Rural Development since May 2024 and as a member of the National Assembly for Goma since 2024. He had previously served as the Minister of Higher Education from 2021 to 2024, and as deputy for Butembo from 2012 to 2024.

== Biography ==
Nzangi was born in Kyavinyonge, on the shore of Lake Edward in Beni Territory, North Kivu, Democratic Republic of the Congo on November 11, 1980. Nzangi was elected as a provincial deputy for Lubero Territory in North Kivu in 2006. In August 2013, he was arrested by the ANR and convicted by the Supreme Court on the charges of "undermining state security" and "insulting the head of state."

Nzangi was elected to the National Assembly in 2011 for the constituency of Butembo during the 2011 legislative elections. He was re-elected in 2018 under the Together for the Republic party. Nzangi was part of TFR until July 2022 when he created his own party Volunteer Action for Patriotic Relief, though the VAPR was still close to TFR founder Moise Katumbi. On April 12, 2021, Nzangi was appointed as the Minister of Higher Education, and served in the first and second Lukonde cabinets.

Nzangi sided with Katumbi when the latter announced his intention to run for the 2023 presidential election, although many TFR ministers left the cabinet. In January 2024, Nzangi was elected as deputy for the city of Goma. On May 29, 2024, Nzangi was appointed as the Minister of Rural Development.
