= Future of the Congo =

Political party in the Democratic Republic of the Congo

- President: Patrick Bologna Rafiki
- Secretary-General: Tristan Etumba Boyengo
- Founders: Patrick Bologna Rafiki; Danny Banza
- Founded: November 28, 2009; 16 years ago
- Headquarters: 2 Route des Poids-Lourds, Kinshasa, DRC
- Ideology: Liberalism
- Colors: Red and White
- National Assembly: 12 / 500
- Senate: 6 / 109
- Provincial Deputies: 20 / 780

Party flag
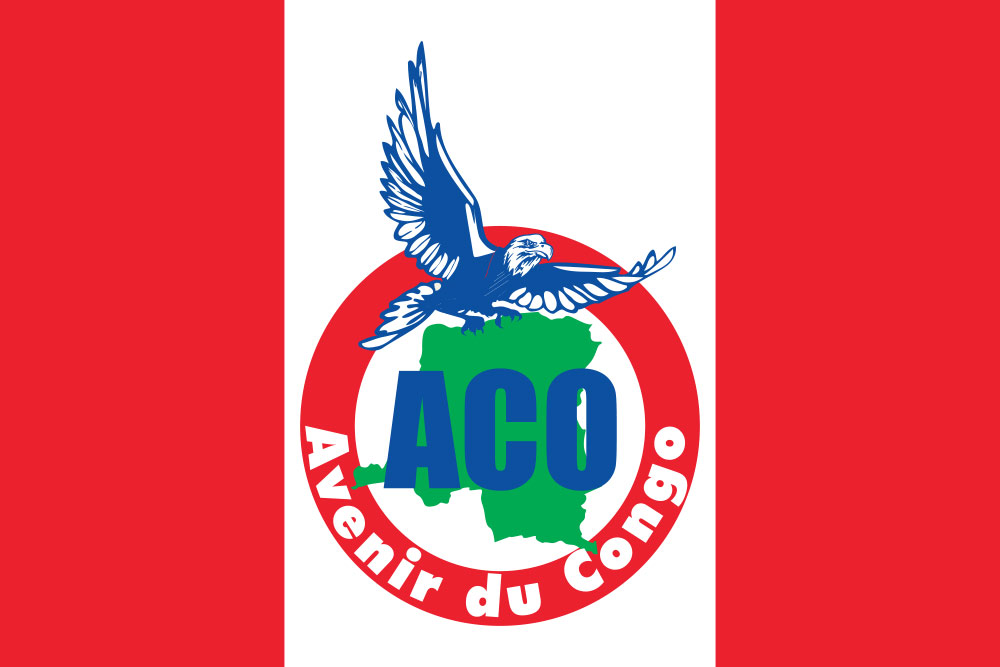

Future of Congo (ACO; French: Avenir du Congo) is a political party in the Democratic Republic of the Congo. It was founded in 2009 by Patrick Bologna Rafiki and currently holds 12 seats in the National Assembly.

Jean-Michel Sama Lukonde, who was prime minister between 26 April 2021 and 12 June 2024, is from the party.

== Ideology ==
Future of Congo advocates for a societal project based on economic liberalism with a human face, free enterprise, and a decentralized market economy.

== Coalitions ==
In July 2018, Future of Congo joined the Common Front for Congo coalition. The coalition broke up in 2020, and Future of Congo joined Sacred Union of the Nation.
