= Minister of Defence (Democratic Republic of the Congo) =

Democratic Republic of the Congo Minister of Defence
Department overview
- Jurisdiction: Democratic Republic of the Congo
- Headquarters: Kinshasa
- Minister responsible: Guy Kabombo Muadiamvita

The Minister of Defence and Veterans (French: Ministre de la Défense et des Anciens combattants) is a minister of the DR Congo government responsible for implementation of government defence policy and supervises the Armed Forces of the Democratic Republic of the Congo.

The President, Félix Tshisekedi is the Commander-in-Chief of the Armed Forces. Defence ministers are formally Ministers of Defence, and Veterans (Ancien Combattants).

== Ministers of defence ==
- Patrice Lumumba, June 1960 - September 1960
- Vital Moanda, September 1960
- Cyrille Adoula, August 1961 - July 1962
- Jérôme Anany, July 1962 - July 1964
- Joseph Kasavubu, July 1964 - November 1965
- Joseph Désiré Mobutu, November 1965 - October 1966
- Léonard Mulamba, October 1966 - December 1966
- Joseph Désiré Mobutu, December 1966 - 1976 - ?
- Admiral Mavua Mudima, c.1994-97
- General Likulia Bolongo, 1997
- General Donatien Mahele Lieko Bokungu, 1997
- Laurent-Desire Kabila, 1997 – 2001
- Irung Awan, 2001 – 2003
- Jean-Pierre Ondekane (of the Rally for Congolese Democracy-Goma (RCD-G)), July 2003-January 2005
- Adolphe Onusumba Yemba (of RCD-G), January 2005-February 2007
- Chikez Diemu, February 2007-October 2008
- Charles Mwando Simba, October 2008-April 2012
- Alexandre Luba Ntambo, April 2012-December 2014
- Aime Ngoy Mukena, December 2014-September 2015
- Crispin Atama Tabe, September 2015-March 2019
- Michel Bongongo, March 2019 - September 2019
- Aimé Ngoy Mukena, September 2019 - April 2021
- Gilbert Kabanda Kurhenga, April 2021 - March 2023
- Jean-Pierre Bemba, March 2023 - May 2024
- Guy Kabombo Mwadiamvita, May 2024 -
