= Alexis Gizaro Muvuni =

Congolese politician

Alexis Gisaro Muvuni is a politician from the Democratic Republic of the Congo.

He was the Minister of Infrastructure and Public Works for the cabinet of Sama Lukonde, from 2021 to 2024.
