= Alexandre Luba Ntambo =

Politician from the Democratic Republic of the Congo

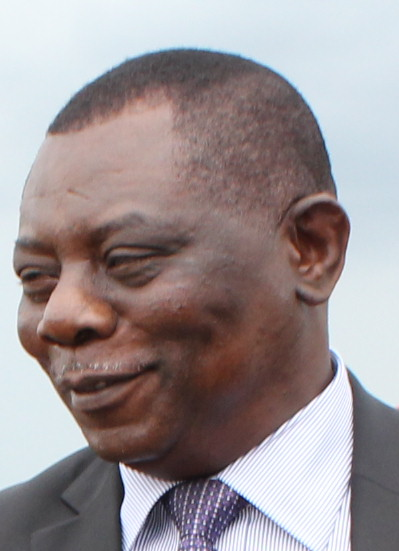

Alexandre Luba Ntambo is a politician from the Democratic Republic of the Congo. He serves as the Deputy Prime Minister under President Joseph Kabila. He also serves as the Minister of Defence and Veterans' Affairs. He took the post on 28 April 2012.

== Biography ==
He was born on 14 December 1947 at Manono (Katanga). He was trained as a chemist. He gained a pharmacists' diploma from Kinshasa University in 1975, and he has worked for Gecamines since 1981.

He was appointed as Minister of National Security on April 28, 2012.

He has expressed confidence in the International Conference on the Great Lakes Region. In 2012, he praised the Southern African Development Community for adding more troops to the eastern region of the DRC.

He is married and a father of five children.
