= Jane Asiimwe Muhindo =

Ugandan politician and civil servant

- Born: c. 1988 (age 37–38); Kasese District, Uganda
- Citizenship: Uganda
- Education: Railway Primary School, Kasese; Celak Vocational School, Kasese; Kasese High School
- Alma mater: Uganda Martyrs University; Makerere University
- Occupation: Political Administrator
- Years active: 2011 to present
- Known for: Dedication
- Title: Resident City Commissioner for Kampala Capital City

Jane Asiimwe Muhindo, is a Ugandan politician and civil servant who, in August 2024, was appointed as the Resident City Commissioner (RCC) of Kampala, Uganda's capital city. Before that, she was the Resident District Commissioner (RDC) for Rwampara District, in the Ankole sub-region. She replaced Amina Lukanga, who was transferred to Mbarara District, in the same capacity.

== Background and education ==
Jane Asiimwe Muhindo was born in Kasese District, in the Western Region of Uganda circa: the late 1980s. She is the daughter of the late Sowedi Bwambale and Dorothy Kabugho. She attended Railway Primary School, Kasese, followed by Celak Vocational School, Kasese, where she completed her middle school education. She studied for and obtained her High School Diploma from Kasese High School.

In 2011, she graduated with a Bachelor's degree from Uganda Martyrs University in Nkozi, Mpigi District. In 2018, she undertook a short course in Public Administration and Policy Implementation at Makerere University, The following year, she completed the Leadership and Governance training at the National Leadership Institute Kyankwanzi, in Kyankwanzi District.

== Career ==
In 2011, Muhindo was elected as the youth councilor at Kasese District Council, serving in that capacity until 2016. She also served as the deputy speaker of Kasese District Council, between 2014 and 2018.

She was then appointed Resident District Commissioner for Bunyangabu District, serving in that capacity until 2021. She was transferred to Bushenyi District, and later to Rwampara District, in the same capacity.

On 19 August 2024, the Ugandan head of state in a reshuffle of his RDCs named Muhindo as the new City Resident Commissioner for Kampala, effective that day.

== Other considerations ==
Muhindo's relatively rapid rise within the resident commissioner ranks in the country can be attributed to her dedication to her assignments. In Bunyangabo District, she is reported to have dedicatedly enforced standard operating procedures (SOPs) established to control the COVID-19 pandemic. In Bushenyi District, she was an ardent promoter of universal primary education (UPE). In Rwampara District, she was very active in resolving land conflicts and ensuring that money meant for government social programs; Emyooga and Parish Development Model (PDM) reaches the intended beneficiaries and is not stolen by political bureaucrats.

== See also ==
- Jennifer Musisi
- Dorothy Kisaka
