= Faustin Luanga =

Congolese politician and diplomat

His Excellency Faustin Luanga
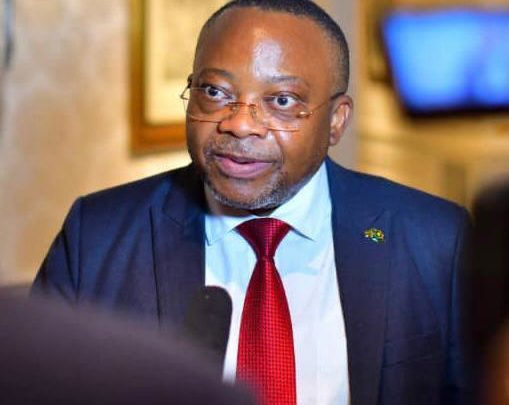

Ambassador-at-large of the Democratic Republic of the Congo
- Incumbent
- Assumed office 4 June 2021
- President: Félix Tshisekedi

Personal details
- Born: Faustin Mukela Luanga; 15 February 1964 (age 62) Kindu, Congo
- Citizenship: Democratic Republic of the Congo
- Education: University of Kinshasa, International University of Japan, Nagoya University
- Alma mater: Nagoya University
- Occupation: Diplomat, politician
- Profession: Economist, Professor
- Known for: Ambassador-at-large of the Democratic Republic of Congo

Faustin Luanga (born 15 February 1964) is a Congolese politician and career diplomat who has been Ambassador-at-large for the Democratic Republic of the Congo since 4 June 2021.

== Education ==
Faustin Luanga obtained a bachelor's degree in economics from the University of Kinshasa in 1988 before getting a master's degree in international relations from the International University of Japan in 1991 and a doctorate in economics from the University of Nagoya in 1994.

== Diplomatic career ==
In 1996 Faustin Luanga joined the World Trade Organization (WTO) and served as advisor to the Economic and Statistics Division as well as to the Division of the Institute for Training and Technical Cooperation where he was Advisor in charge of the Africa Office before becoming Regional Head for the economies of Asia and the Pacific, a position he holds to this day.

== Involvement in government ==
Between 2001 and 2006, Faustin Luanga held political office with the rank of Minister of State in his country of origin, the Democratic Republic of Congo (DRC). He was special advisor to the President of the DRC, Joseph Kabila, in charge of all economic, financial and development issues, coordinating and supervising all the ministries linked to the Economic and Financial Commission of his country for three years. For two years, Luanga also headed the National Program for the disarmament, demobilization and reintegration of former soldiers, at a time where the DRC had just left a decade of war.
