= Célestin Vunabandi =

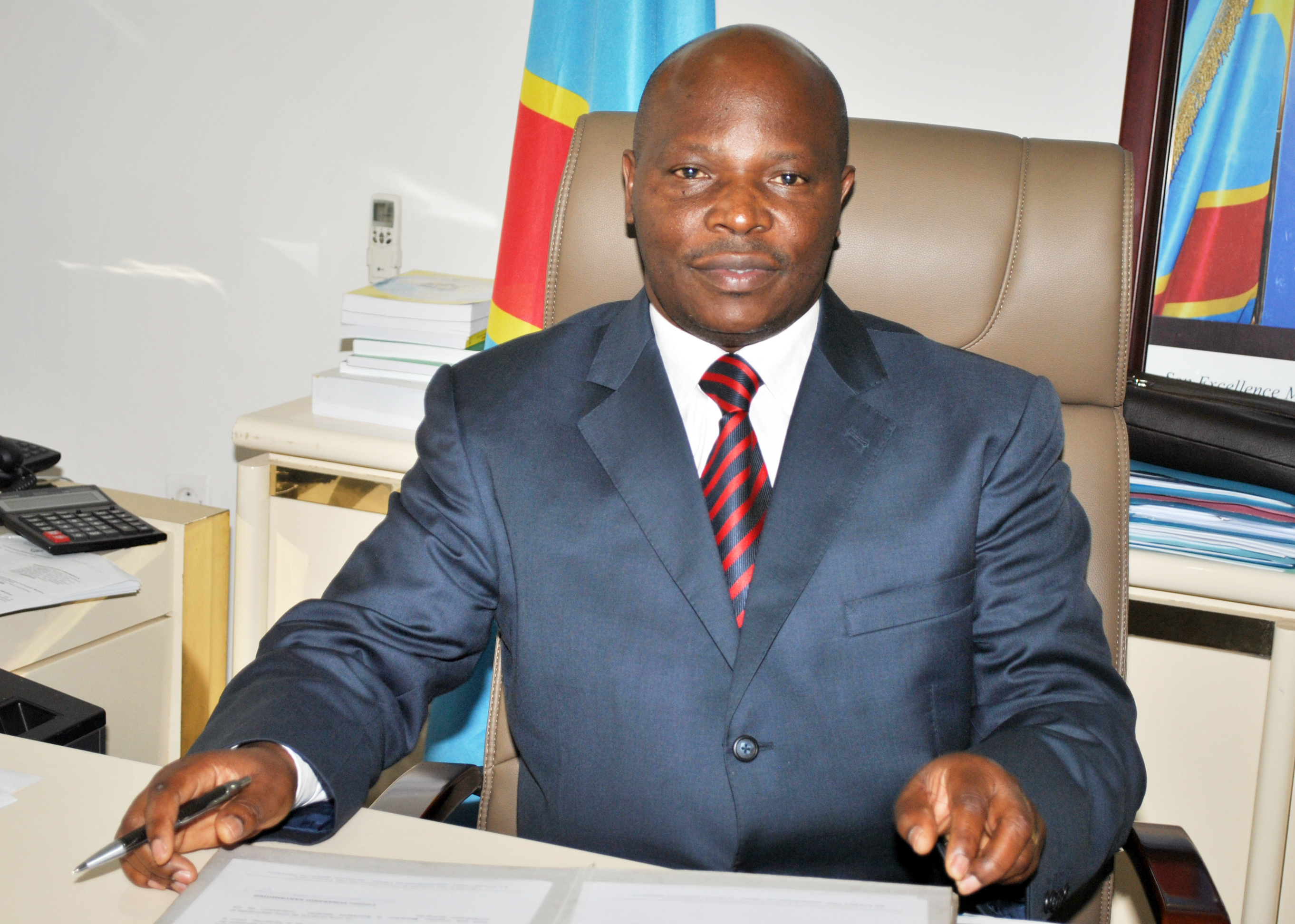
- Vunabandi in 2012

Senator for North Kivu
- Incumbent
- Assumed office January 20, 2024

Minister of Planning and Oversight for the Implementation of the Revolution of Modernity
- In office April 6, 2012 – December 7, 2014
- Preceded by: Position established
- Succeeded by: Olivier Kamitatu

Personal details
- Born: Célestin Vunabandi Kanyamihigo; May 9, 1964 (age 62) Jomba, Rutshuru Territory, Democratic Republic of the Congo
- Party: ACN (until 2024); Independent (2024-present)
- Education: University of Kinshasa

Célestin Vunabandi Kanyamihigo is a Congolese politician currently serving as a senator for North Kivu since 2024 and previously serving as the Minister of Planning from 2012 to 2014.

== Biography ==
Vunabandi was born on May 19, 1964, in Jomba, Rutshuru Territory, North Kivu, Democratic Republic of the Congo. He graduated with a degree in applied economics from the University of Kinshasa in 1988. He is part of the Action For A New Congo (Action Pour un Congo Nouveau, ACN) party. Vunabandi is one of the richest men in North Kivu.

In 2003, Vunabandi was appointed Minister of the National Economy. He worked with Joseph Kabila in attracting European Union investors into the DRC. In 2004, he was investigated for corruption. In 2006, he was elected as a member of parliament for Rutshuru. In 2009, Vunabandi was replaced by Emile Ngoy as Minister of Higher Education, and Vunabandi replaced Joseph Mudumbi as Minister of Public Firms.

In April 2012, Vunabandi was appointed Minister of Planning and Oversight for the Implementation of the Revolution of Modernity. While serving as MP and as a minister, Vunabandi was a consultant for American oil firm Soco International and used his position to push for Soco drilling projects in environmentally-sensitive areas including Virunga National Park. His brother, Damas Vunabandi, worked as a protocol officer for Soco. Soco paid Vunabandi for promote the oil firm and organize protests in favor of Soco and oil drilling. In a report by Global Witness in 2014, a French worker for Soco, when asked how Soco created demonstrations in favor of the company, said "In fact, via Vunabandi, who is the minister. He’s our friend. He knows everyone. Just need to send cash and it’s done." He was replaced as Minister of Planning on December 7, 2014.

In February 2024, Vunabandi was elected provincial deputy for North Kivu, running as an independent. He is part of the Congolese Senate's Finance Committee. In May 2026, he was summoned by the Congolese Senate over his mismanagement of land nationalized after the fall of Zaire (Zairianized land).
