= Guy Loando Mboyo =

Congolese politician, Minister of State in charge of Regional Planning

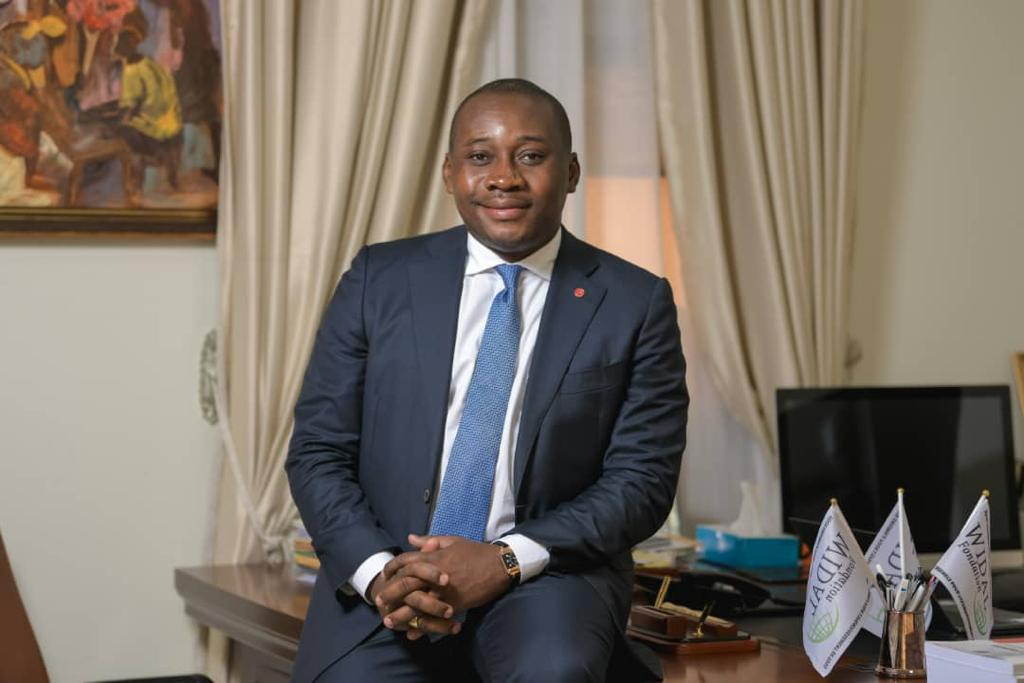

Minister of regional planning of the Democratic Republic of the Congo
- Incumbent
- Assumed office April 26, 2021
- President: Félix Tshisekedi
- Prime Minister: Jean-Michel Sama Lukonde
- Majority: Union Sacrée de la Nation (USN)

Founder & president of Widal Foundation
- Incumbent
- Assumed office September 2018

Member of the Democratic Republic of the Congo Senate
- In office May 14, 2019 – April 26, 2021

Personal details
- Born: February 5, 1983 (age 43) Bokungu, Tshuapa, DRC
- Party: Independent
- Spouse: Deborah Linda Loando
- Children: 3
- Education: University of Kinshasa
- Occupation: Lawyer
- Website: cabglm.com fondationwidal.org

Guy Loando Mboyo (born February 5, 1983) is a lawyer, Congolese politician and a member of the Senate of Democratic Republic of the Congo since 2019 who was appointed Minister of State in charge of Regional Planning since April 2021. He is the founder of the Widal Foundation in September 2018.

== Biography ==
=== Education ===
Guy Loando Mboyo was born on February 5, 1983, in Bokungu in the province of the Tshuapa (formerly Grand-Équateur, in Zaire, currently the Democratic Republic of the Congo). He was the last born in a family of eight children. During his childhood, his family moved to Mbandaka where he did his secondary studies. He obtained his state diploma in literary studies at the Mbandaka School of Application (École d'application de Mbandaka, in acronym EDAP) in 2001 and moved to the country's capital city Kinshasa to continue his university studies in law at the University of Kinshasa.

=== Career ===
After graduating in law (with a specialisation in social and economic law) from the University of Kinshasa, Guy Loando Mboyo began his career as a lawyer and legal advisor in the mining, business and private investment sectors. He gained important contacts at national and international level which allowed him to start working in business. He is the main shareholder of "GLM & Associates", a law firm based in Kinshasa, administrator of companies and chairman of the Widal Foundation.

Guy Loando Mboyo was elected senator of Tshuapa in the April 2019 senatorial elections in the Democratic Republic of Congo. In November 2020, he had his first book, entitled "Le Congo d'après : Nécessité d'un changement de cap post-Covid-19" published, by French book publisher L'Harmattan.

In April 2021, he was appointed Minister of State in charge of Regional Planning by President Félix Tshisekedi.

=== Widal Foundation ===
Through this humanitarian structure Widal Foundation, created in September 2018 with his wife, Déborah Linda Loando, Mboyo pursues an objective to reduce poverty in the Democratic Republic of the Congo, especially in Tshuapa and Kinshasa. On Sunday May 5, 2019, in the municipality of Limete (Kinshasa), during the official launch of the foundation, Guy Loando explained his objectives and his mission, which are to support the most vulnerable in Congolese society by training them to become entrepreneurs.

== Personal life ==
He is married to Déborah Linda Loando (born Déborah "Bobo" Elite Linda) and is the father of their three children.

== Publications ==
- 2020 : L'Après Covid-19 se prépare dès maintenant ! (Tribune)
- 2020 : Le Congo d'après : Nécessité d'un changement de cap post-Covid-19, L'Harmattan (ISBN 978-2-343-21547-1)

== Recognition ==
=== Awards ===
- 2019 : Excellence Prize for Initiative and Development, awarded by Pan-African Observation for Initiative and Development
- 2020 : Diploma of merit, awarded by the National League of Anamongos (Ligue Nationale des Anamongos, in acronym LINA )

=== Honorary degrees ===
- 2022 : Honorary degree from ICN (I Change Nations).
