= Irène Esambo =

Congolese lawyer and politician

Irène Esambo Diata

Minister-Delegate to the Minister of Social Affairs
- Incumbent
- Assumed office August 2019

Irène Esambo Diata is a human rights lawyer and politician in the Democratic Republic of Congo. A woman with a disability, in 2019 Esambo became DRC's first minister for people with disabilities. In the 2021 Lukonde government she kept her place in cabinet, as Minister-delegate to the Minister of Social Affairs, in charge of the Disabled and Other Vulnerable Persons.

== Life ==
Irène Esambo practiced law for many years in Kinshasa, with expertise in cases of sexual violence, disability rights and victims of war. She was head of the Centre d'Études sur la Justice et la Résolution 1325 (CJR), aiming at security sector reform in the light of United Nations Security Council Resolution 1325. In 2013 she was appointed as a lawyer with the International Criminal Court.

In August 2019 Esambo was announced as a member of the Ilunga government, taking the new role of Delegate to the Minister of Social Affairs in charge of people living with disabilities and other vulnerable people.

In 2020 she worked to prepare a disability rights law for DRC.

After several months of negotiations on the composition of the new government, the Lukonde government was announced on 12 April 2021. Esambo continued as minister delegate for disabled people in the new cabinet.
