= Rose Mutombo =

DRC lawyer and politician

Rose Mutombo Kiese
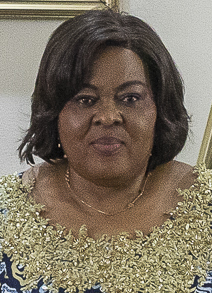
- Rose Mutombo in 2023

Minister of Justice and Keeper of the Seals
- Incumbent
- Assumed office 12 April 2021

Personal details
- Born: 19 March 1960 (age 66) Kananga
- Occupation: politician

Rose Mutombo Kiese (born 1960) is a DR Congo lawyer and politician. She is the national president of the Permanent Consultative Framework for Congolese Women (CAFCO). In 2021 she was appointed Minister of Justice and Keeper of the Seals in the Lukonde government.

== Life ==
Rose Mutombo Kiese was born in Kananga on 19 March 1960. She trained as a lawyer and worked as a magistrate at the General Prosecutor's Office at the Council of State. She was National President of the Permanent Consultative Framework for Congolese Women (CAFCO).

After several months of negotiations on the composition of the Sacred Union of the Nation in early 2021, in April 2021 Rose Mutombo was announced as Minister of Justice within the Lukonde government.
