= Ministry of Scientific Research and Technology =

Government ministry of the Democratic Republic of the Congo

The Ministry of Scientific Research and Technology is the science and technology ministry of the Democratic Republic of the Congo. As of 2018, the minister for science and technology was Evariste Heva Muakasa.

The Ministry of Science and Technology is the responsible ministry for the Institut National pour la Recherche Biomedicale.
