= José Mpanda Kabangu =

Congolese politician

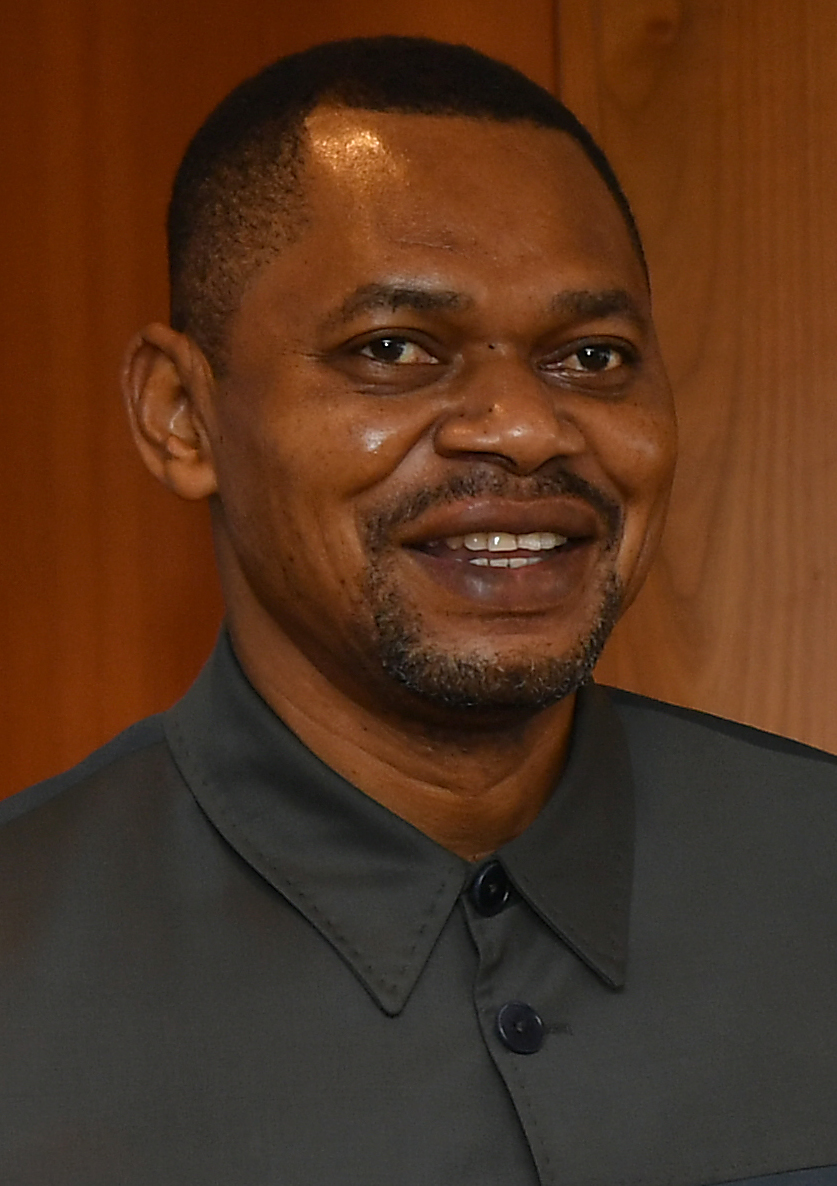

Minister of Scientific Research and Technological Innovation
- In office September 2019 – April 2021

Personal details
- Born: 31 August 1971 (age 54) Mbuji-Mayi, Democratic Republic of the Congo

José Mpanda Kabangu (born 31 August 1971) is a Congolese politician. In 2019, he was appointed as the Minister of Scientific Research and Technological Innovation of Democratic Republic of the Congo, under Ilunga government that ran from September 2019 to April 2021, as well as a member of parliament. He is a member of Union for Democracy and Social Progress.
