= Parliament of the Democratic Republic of the Congo =

Bicameral legislature of the Democratic Republic of the Congo

Coordinates: 4.3322°S 15.3031°E

Parliament of the Democratic Republic of the Congo Parlement de la République démocratique du Congo
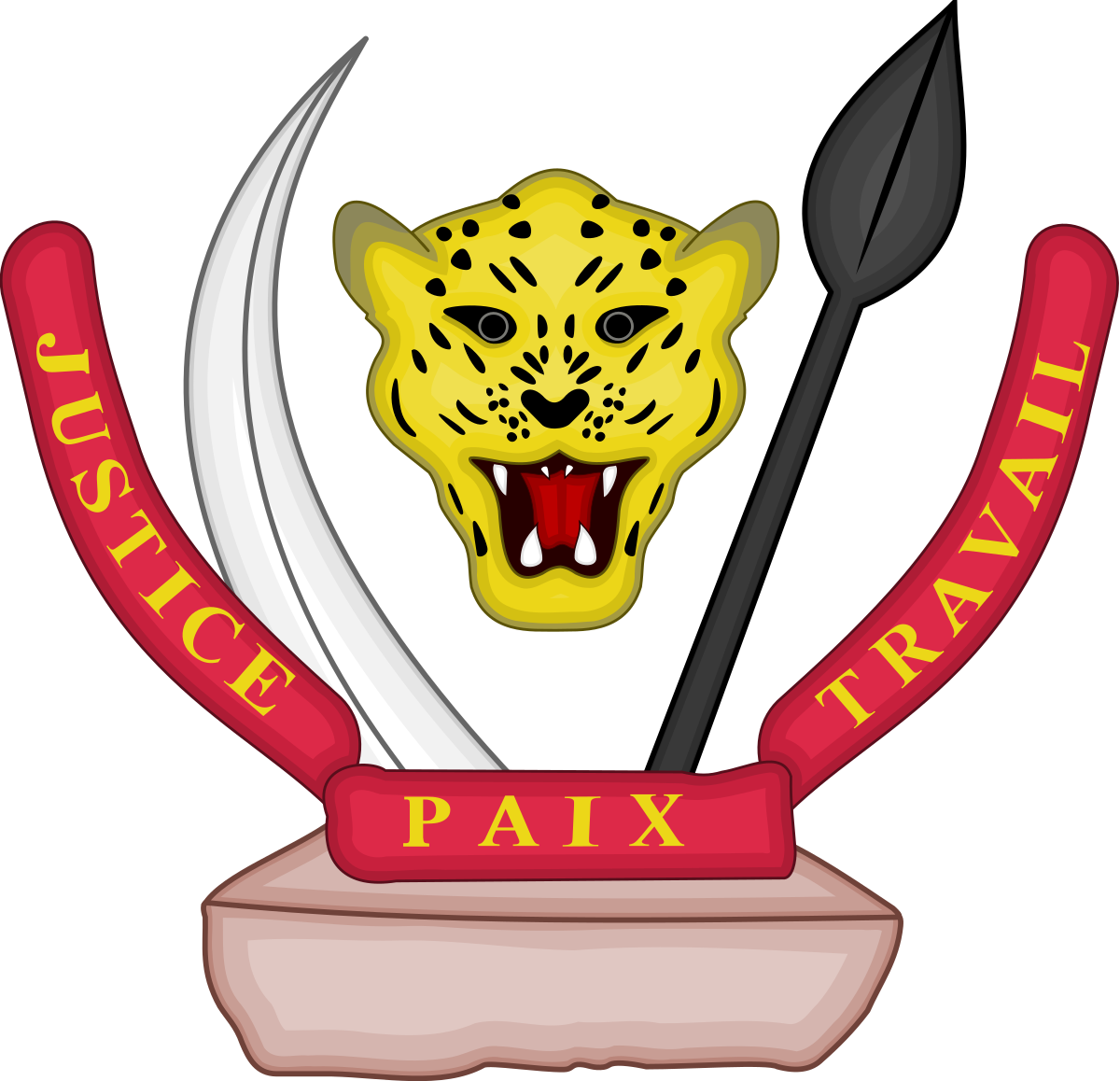

Type
- Type: Bicameral
- Houses: National Assembly; Senate

Leadership
- President of the Senate: Sama Lukonde since 12 August 2024
- President of the National Assembly: Aimé Boji since 14 November 2025
- Seats: 609 members (500 and 109)

Elections
- National Assembly voting system: Coexistence: Open list proportional representation with the largest remainder method in multi-member constituencies and first-past-the-post voting in single-member constituencies
- Senate voting system: Indirectly elected

Meeting place
- Palais du Peuple (Kinshasa)

Website
- www.assembleenationale.cd www.senat.cd

The Parliament of the Democratic Republic of the Congo (French: Parlement de la République Démocratique du Congo) is the legislative branch of the Congolese government. It consists of two chambers:

- The Senate (Upper Chamber)
- The National Assembly (Lower Chamber)

The most recent Parliament was inaugurated on January 28, 2019.

== History ==
By 28 May 2021, 32 members of the DRC parliament, 5% of the total, had died due to COVID-19 during the COVID-19 pandemic in the Democratic Republic of the Congo.

== See also ==
- Politics of the Democratic Republic of the Congo
- List of legislatures by country
