= Charles Mwando Simba =

Congolese politician

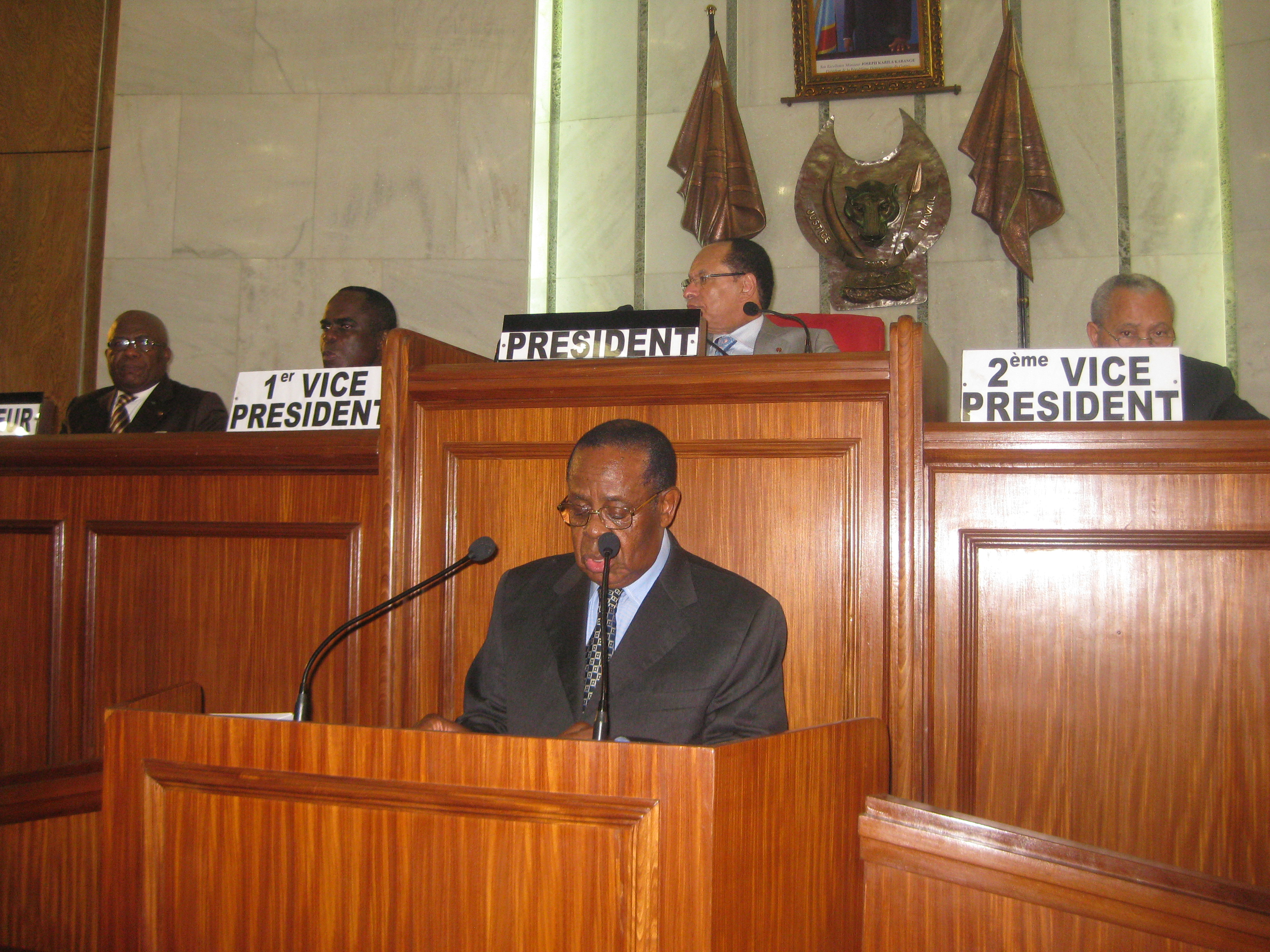
Charles Mwando Simba addressing the Senate in 2009

Charles Mwando Simba (18 October 1936 – 12 December 2016) was a Congolese politician and member of UNADEF. He was born in Moba, Tanganyika District. From 6 February 2007, to October 2008, he served in the government of the Democratic Republic of the Congo as Minister of Rural Development. In October 2008, he was appointed as Defense Minister in Adolphe Muzito's cabinet, succeeding Chikez Diemu. In April 2012, he became the first vice-president of the National Assembly of the Democratic Republic of the Congo, a position he held until his death.

Mwando Simba also served as a minister during the Congo's second republic and was Governor of Grand Kivu for 12 years.

According to the MLC, he held Belgian nationality as of 28 May 2002, as can be seen on page 29,149 of a letter signed by the Belgian king.
