= Jean-Pierre Lihau =

Jean-Pierre Lihau Ebua Kalokola Monga Libana, better known as Jean-Pierre Lihau (born 20 January 1975 in Kinshasa) is a DR Congo politician from the People's Party for Reconstruction and Democracy currently serving as Minister of the Civil Service, Administrative Modernization and Innovation in Public Services in the Lukonde cabinet.

He claims to be the son of Marcel Lihau, the first president of the country's Supreme Court. In July 1998, Marcel Lihau and his six daughters filed a lawsuit against Martin Lihau and Jean-Pierre Lihau contesting the filiation between the plaintiff and the defendants. Professor and Justice Marcel Lihau requested a DNA test for any filiation outside of his legal children, his 6 daughters.
