= Judith Suminwa =

Prime Minister of the Democratic Republic of the Congo since 2024

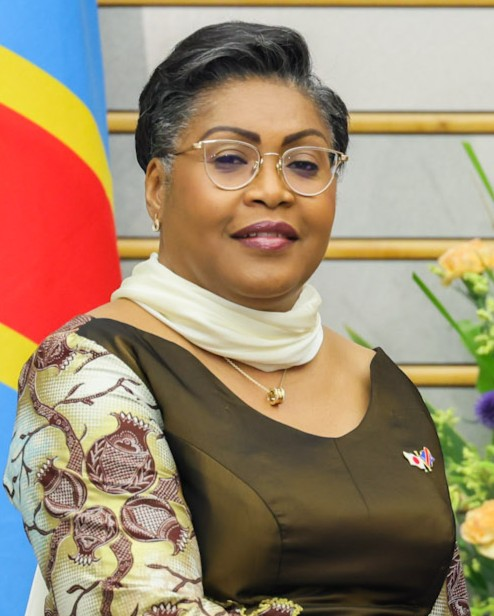
- Suminwa in 2025

Prime Minister of the Democratic Republic of the Congo
- Incumbent
- Assumed office 12 June 2024
- President: Félix Tshisekedi
- Preceded by: Sama Lukonde

Minister of State Minister of Planning
- In office 24 March 2023 – April 2024
- Prime Minister: Sama Lukonde
- Preceded by: Christian Mwando Nsimba
- Succeeded by: Eustache Muhanzi (interim)

Personal details
- Born: 19 October 1967 (age 58) Kongo Central, Democratic Republic of the Congo
- Party: Union for Democracy and Social Progress
- Spouse: Roger Tuluka
- Education: Catholic university of Mons; Université libre de Bruxelles

Judith Suminwa Tuluka (born 19 October 1967) is a Congolese politician who has served as Prime Minister of the Democratic Republic of the Congo since 2024, and is the first woman to hold the position. Prior to her tenure as prime minister she was Minister of State and Minister of Planning.

== Early life and education ==
Judith Suminwa Tuluka was born in Kongo Central, on 19 October 1967. Her father was the ambassador to Chad during Mobutu Sese Seko's presidency. She graduated from the Catholic university of Mons with a bachelor's degree in applied economic sciences and from the Université libre de Bruxelles with a master's degree in labour studies. She returned to the DRC in 1997, and worked at Citibank.

== Career ==
Suminwa applied to the Office of the United Nations High Commissioner for Human Rights and worked as an administrative and financial assistant before becoming a member of the United Nations Development Programme.

She is a member of Union for Democracy and Social Progress (UDPS). She was deputy coordinator of the Presidential Council for Strategic Monitoring. She was appointed to the Lukonde cabinet as Minister of State and Minister of Planning in 2023.

Prime Minister Sama Lukonde submitted his resignation on 21 February 2024. She is the first woman to serve as prime minister. Her initial cabinet contained 54 people, with 18 being women.

== Personal life ==
Suminwa is married to Roger Tuluka, a former classmate of Félix Tshisekedi who she met in Belgium in the 1990s.

== Political positions ==
Suminwa has been critical of Rwanda for its occupation of areas in eastern DRC and accused it of supporting rebel groups, such as the Congo River Alliance, to overthrow the DRC's government.

== Works cited ==
=== News ===
- "A Addis-Abeba, Judith Suminwa met en lumière les affres de l'agression rwandaise dans l'Est de la RDC". Radio Okapi. 15 February 2025. Archived from the original on 23 June 2025.
- "Judith Suminwa Tuluka devient la première femme Première ministre de la RDC". Le Baobab. 1 April 2024. Archived from the original on 23 June 2025.
- "RDC: Judith Suminwa Tuluka nommée Première ministre". RTBF. 1 April 2024. Archived from the original on 23 June 2025.
- Ba-Mweze, Jean-Noël (2 April 2024). "Judith Suminwa, première femme cheffe du gouvernement en RDC". Deutsche Welle. Archived from the original on 23 June 2025.
- Duhem, Vincent (8 April 2024). "DRC: 10 things to know about new PM Judith Suminwa Tuluka". The Africa Report. Archived from the original on 23 June 2025.
- Lokale, Prisca (27 March 2023). "RDC-Sama Lukonde II : ce qu'il faut savoir de Judith Tuluka Suminwa, la nouvelle ministre d'Etat en charge du Plan". Actualite. Archived from the original on 23 June 2025.
- Fischer, Nikolas (20 September 2024). "Congo govt.'s first 100 days see many goals, few results". Deutsche Welle. Archived from the original on 23 June 2025.

=== Web ===
- "Embassy of the DRC Republic in Nairobi". Embassy of the DRC Republic in Nairobi. Archived from the original on 23 June 2025.
- "Hon. Judith Suminwa Tuluka". Extractive Industries Transparency Initiative. Archived from the original on 23 June 2025.

Political offices
Preceded by Sama Lukonde	Prime Minister of the Democratic Republic of the Congo; 2024–present	Incumbent
