= Augustin Kibassa =

Congolese politician (born 1971)

- Born: 30 November 1971 (age 54); Democratic Republic of the Congo
- Occupation: Politician
- Parent(s): Frédéric Kibassa Maliba (father), Euprhasie Kibassa Maliba (mother)

Augustin Kibassa Maliba (born 30 November 1971), is a Congolese politician. He was the Minister of Postal Services, Telecommunications and New Information and Communication Services of Democratic Republic of the Congo, under Ilunga government that ran from September 2019 to April 2021, as well as a member of parliament. He is president of the UDPS/KIBASSA, dissident faction and independent political party of the Union for Democracy and Social Progress.
