= Didier Budimbu =

Congolese politician

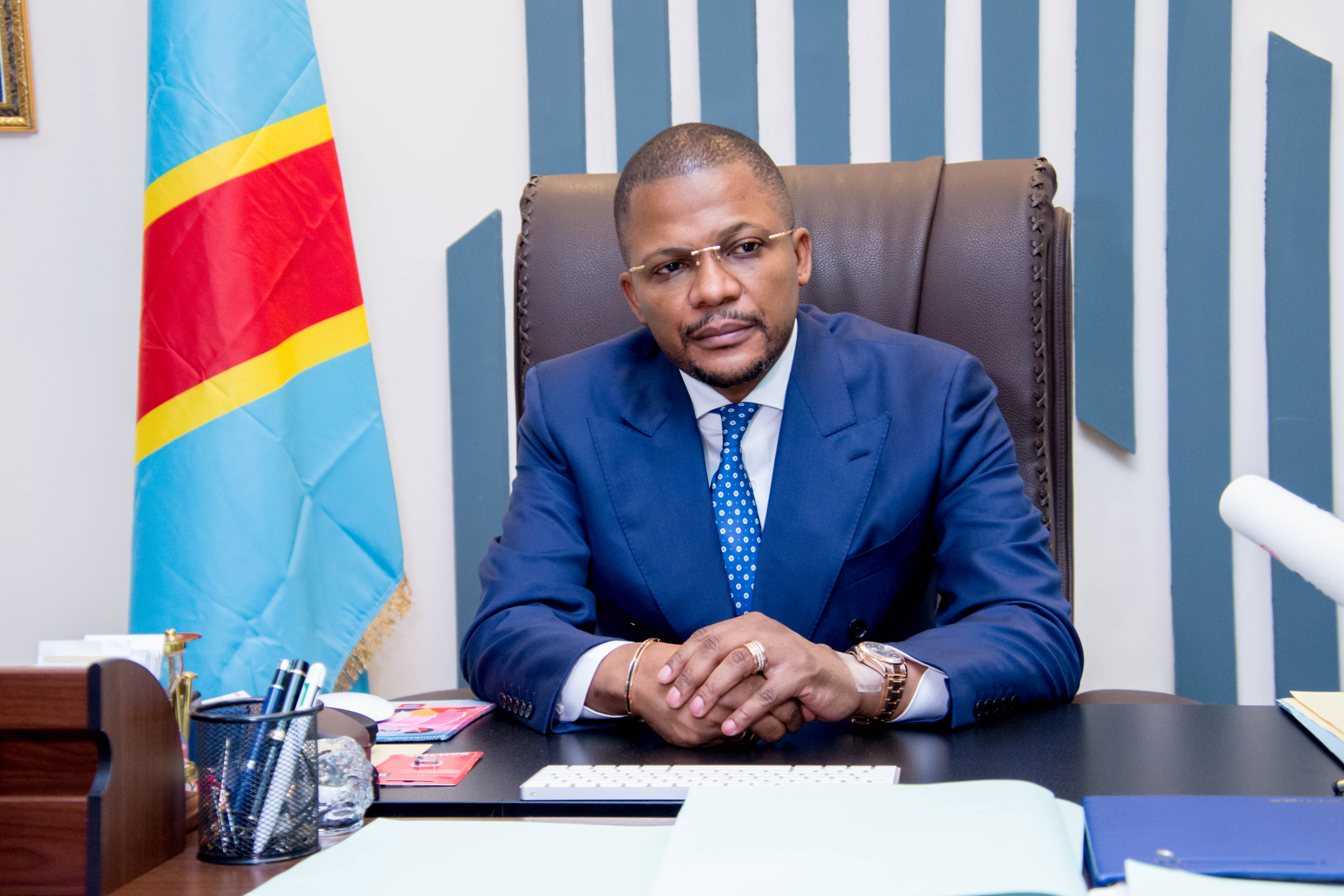
- Budimbu in 2012
- Born: Democratic Republic of the Congo
- Occupation: Politician

Didier Budimbu is a Congolese politician. In 2019, he was appointed as the Deputy Minister of Primary, Secondary and Technical Education of Democratic Republic of the Congo, under Ilunga government that ran from September 2019 to April 2021, as well as a member of parliament. He is the leader of Another Vision of Congo and Allies (Autre Vision du Congo et Alliés, AVC-A), a political grouping made up of seven political parties that formed on April 20, 2023. The group supports Liberalism, anti-corruption, and human rights.
