= Jean-Lucien Bussa =

Congolese politician (born 1962)

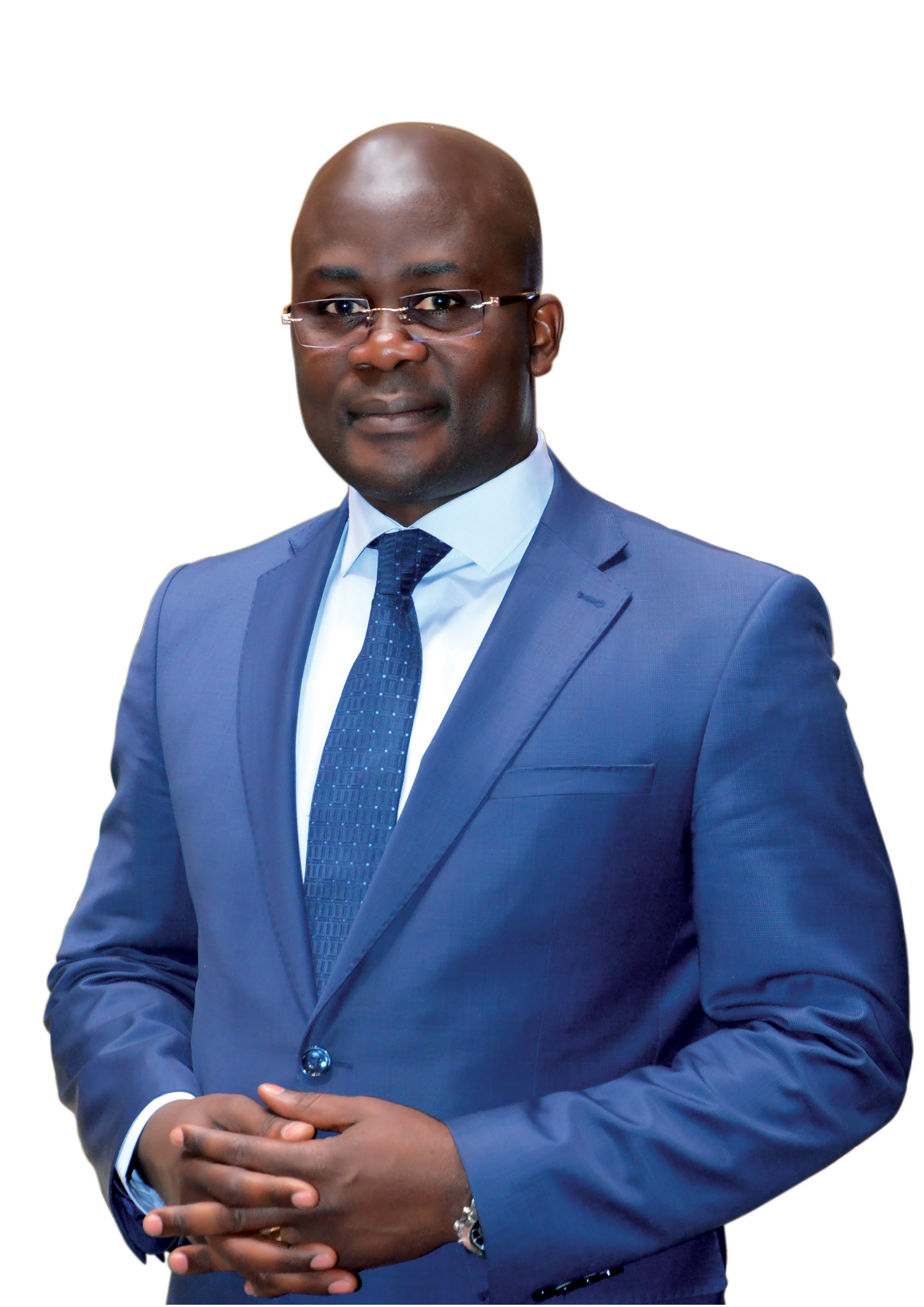
- Born: 26 March 1962 (age 63); Democratic Republic of the Congo
- Occupation: Politician

Jean-Lucien Bussa Tongba (born 26 March 1962) is a Congolese politician. He has been Minister of External Trade since 2017, under Ilunga government that ran from September 2019 to April 2021, as well as a member of parliament since 2019. He is the coordinator of the political platform Coalition of Democrats (coalition des démocrates, CODE). He has been the Minister of Portfolio since 2024.

== Life and career ==
He was an initiator and president of the political party Courant des démocrates rénovateurs (CDER) from 2013 to December 2016. Following the failure of the presidential election in 2016, Bussa led the political opposition delegation to the pre-dialogue facilitated by former Secretary-General of the Organisation of African Unity (OAU), Edem Kodjo, which will result in a government of national unity with the primacy of the opposition.

He was elected to the National Assembly in the 2018 election, and was re-elected in the 2023 election. His parliamentary tenure was suspended on 15 June 2024 after his appointment as Minister of Portfolio. He was succeeded by his substitute Romain-Landry Bussa Mbule.
