= Sama Lukonde =

Politician from the Democratic Republic of the Congo

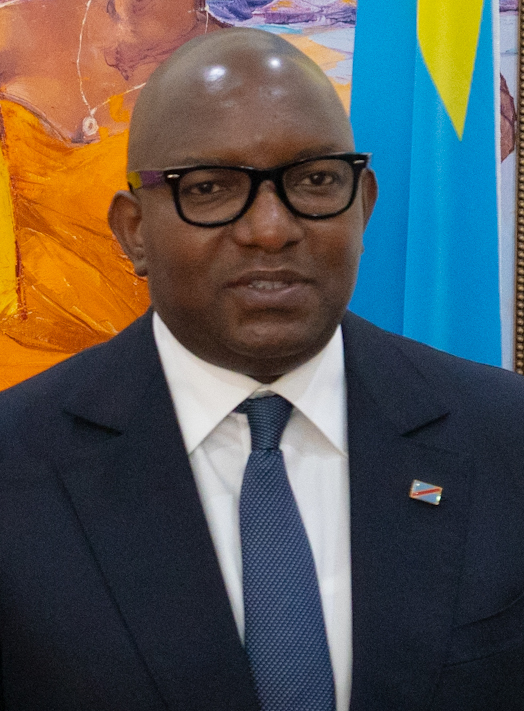
- Lukonde in 2022

President of the Senate of the Democratic Republic of the Congo
- Incumbent
- Assumed office 12 August 2024
- Preceded by: Pascal Kinduelo Lumbu

Prime Minister of the Democratic Republic of the Congo
- In office 26 April 2021 – 12 June 2024
- President: Félix Tshisekedi
- Preceded by: Sylvestre Ilunga
- Succeeded by: Judith Suminwa

Personal details
- Born: 4 August 1977 (age 48) Paris, France
- Party: Future of Congo

Jean-Michel Sama Lukonde Kyenge (born 4 August 1977) is a Congolese politician from the former Katanga Province who served as Prime Minister of the Democratic Republic of the Congo from 2021 to 2024. He announced his first cabinet on 12 April 2021. He is a member of the Future of Congo party. He is President of the Senate since August 2024.

== Biography ==
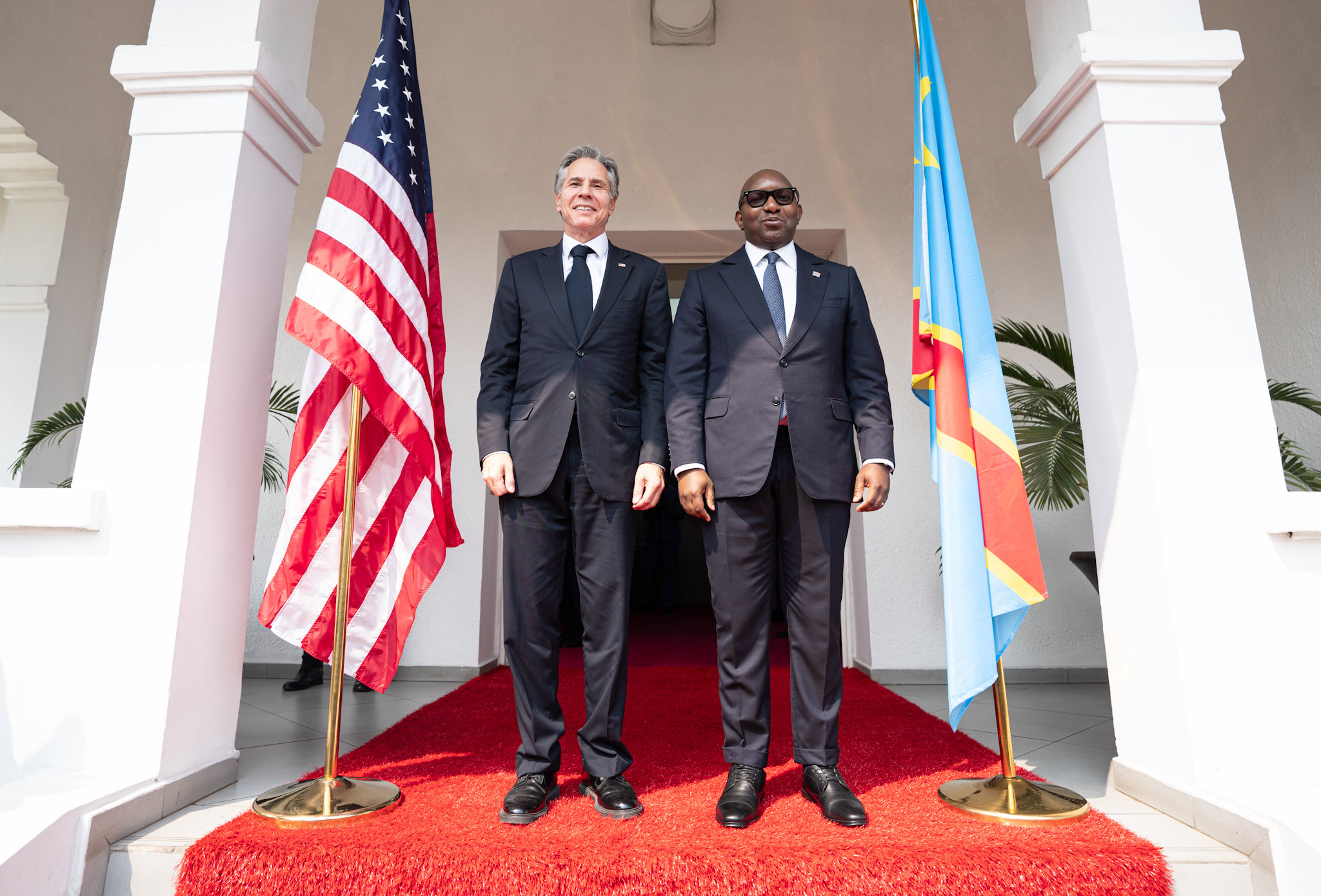
Lukonde with United States Secretary of State Antony Blinken on a visit to Kinshasa in August 2022.

Lukonde was born on 4 August 1977, in Paris, and is an engineer by training. He is the son of Stéphane Lukonde Kyenge, an important figure in the political scene of his native Katanga who was assassinated in 2001.

After being active in politics as a member of the Avenir du Congo (English, Future of Congo) party, and becoming one of the youngest deputy at the National Assembly, Lukonde was named Minister of Youth, Sports, and Leisure in December 2014, during the Joseph Kabila Presidency. He served in this position for 10 months, before resigning to support his party in their opposition to Kabila's bid for a third successive term as President.

In June 2019, Lukonde became the Director-General of Gécamines: one of the largest mining companies in Africa, and the biggest in the Democratic Republic of Congo. He was appointed to this position by President Félix Tshisekedi in June 2019. Prior to this position, he was also deputy general administrator of the Congo National Railway Company.

He was named Prime Minister by Tshisekedi in February 2021. He later named his cabinet. On 20 February 2024, Lukonde tendered his resignation to President Tshisikedi after he decided to join the National Assembly as a member from the Kasenga Territory, having won the seat during the general election of December 2023. He served as acting prime minister until the installation of a new government led by former planning minister Judith Tuluka on 12 June 2024.

On August 12, 2024, Sama Lukonde Kyenge was elected President of the Senate, with 84 votes out of 96.

Political offices
Preceded by Sylvestre Ilunga	Prime Minister of the Democratic Republic of the Congo; 2021–2024	Succeeded by Judith Suminwa
