= List of presidents of the National Assembly of the Democratic Republic of the Congo =

The president of the National Assembly of the Democratic Republic of the Congo is the presiding officer in the National Assembly.

== List of presidents ==
=== Presidents of the Chamber of Representatives ===
Name	Entered office	Left office
Joseph Kasongo	June 1960	March 1962
Yvon Kimpiobi	March 1962	November 1962
Bertin Mwamba	November 1962	March 1963
Joseph Midiburo	3 March 1963	September 1965
Yvon Kimpiobi	September 1965	June 1967

=== Presidents of the Legislative Council ===
Name	Entered office	Left office
Bo-Boliko Lokonga	December 1970	March 1979
Iléo Songo Amba	March 1979	December 1979
Nzondomyo a' Dokpe Lingo	April 1980	March 1984
Kasongo Mukundji	March 1984	October 1987
Kalume Mwana Kahambwe	October 1987	August 1989
Anzuluni Bembe Isilonyoni	August 1989	1993

=== Presidents of the High Council of the Republic ===
Name	Entered office	Left office
Msgr. Laurent Monsengwo Pasinya	December 1992	1994

=== Presidents of the National Assembly ===
Name	Entered office	Left office
Anzuluni Bembe Isilonyoni	1993	1993

=== Presidents of the High Council of the Republic - Transitional Parliament ===
Name	Entered office	Left office
Msgr. Laurent Monsengwo Pasinya	1994	May 1997

=== Presidents of the Constituent and Legislative Assembly - Transitional Parliament ===
Name	Entered office	Left office
Tshamala Wa Kamwanya	2000	2003
Philomène Omatuku Atshakawo Akatshi (ad interim)	2003	22 April 2003

=== Presidents of the National Assembly ===
Name	Entered office	Left office	Notes
Olivier Kamitatu Etsu	April 2003	5 April 2006	
Thomas Luhaka	5 April 2006	December 2006	
Vital Kamerhe	December 2006	25 March 2009	
Christophe Lutundula (ad interim)	25 March 2009	April 2009	
Évariste Boshab	18 April 2009	2012	
Aubin Minaku	12 April 2012	28 January 2019	
Gabriel Kyungu wa Kumwanza	28 January 2019	24 April 2019	
Jeanine Mabunda	24 April 2019	10 December 2020	
Vacant	10 December 2020	3 February 2021	
Christophe Mboso	3 February 2021	24 May 2024	
Vital Kamerhe	24 May 2024	25 September 2025	
Jean-Claude Tshilumbayi (ad interim)	25 September 2025	14 November 2025	
Aimé Boji	14 November 2025		

== Elections ==
=== April 2019 ===
Henri-Thomas Lokondo, vice-president of the Unified Lumumbist Party and allies political grouping, a member of the Common Front for Congo coalition, ran as an independent against Jeanine Mabunda, the candidate of the FFC-CACH alliance who ran a "ticket" to share the majority of the seven positions within the National Assembly's bureau. With the cancellation his candidacy, Mabunda won unopposed as Lamuka boycotted.

First Round
Candidate	Coalition/Party	Votes	%
Jeanine Mabunda	FCC/PPRD	375	100
Valid votes		375	97.91
Invalid		8	2.09
Total		383	100
Eligible voters/turnout		500	76.60

=== 2021 ===
Christophe Mboso, having won the ruling Sacred Union of the Nation (USN) coalition primary, won unopposed as his rivals were disqualified.

First Round
Candidate	Coalition/Party	Votes	%
Jeanine Mabunda	USN/AFDC	389	100
Valid votes		389	83.48
Invalid		69	14.81
Abstentions		8	1.72
Total		466	100
Eligible voters/turnout		500	93.20

=== 2024 ===
On 23 April 2024, the USN held a primary for their candidate, selecting Vital Kamerhe. On 22 May, Kamerhe was elected president with 371 votes with 36 votes being invalid or blank.

Sacred Union of the Nation primary
Candidate	Party	Votes	%
Vital Kamerhe	UNC	183	50.14
Christophe Mboso	CRD	113	30.96
Modeste Bahati Lukwebo	AFDC	69	18.90
Valid votes		365	98.12
Blank votes		7	1.88
Total		372	100
Eligible voters/turnout		447	83.22

First Round
Candidate	Coalition/Party	Votes	%
Vital Kamerhe	USN/UNC	371	100
Valid votes		371	91.15
"Invalid and blank ballots"		36	8.85
Total		407	100
Eligible voters/turnout		477	85.32

== Impeachment votes ==
=== 2020 ===
Impeachment of Jeanine Mabunda
Candidate	Votes	%
For	281	58.42
Against	200	41.58
Valid votes	481	99.59
Present	2	0.41
Total	483	100
Eligible voters/turnout	500	96.60
