= List of senators of Val-de-Marne =

Location of Val-de-Marne in France

Reorganization of the former Seine-et-Oise and Seine departments in 1968. Val-de-Marne extends to the southeast of central Paris.

Following is a list of senators of Val-de-Marne, people who have represented the department of Val-de-Marne in the Senate of France. The department was created in 1968 during a reorganization of the former Seine-et-Oise and Seine departments.

Senators for Val-de-Marne under the French Fifth Republic:

Term	Name	Party	Notes
1968-1977	Jean Bertaud	Union for the Defense of the Republic (UDR)	
1968-1977	Jacques Carat	French Section of the Workers' International (SFIO)	
1968-1977	Louis Talamoni	Groupe Communiste	Died in office 30 April 1975
1968-1977	Hélène Edeline	French Communist Party (PCF)	Replaced Louis Talamoni on 1 May 1975
1968-1977	Roger Gaudon	French Communist Party (PCF)	
1968-1977	Alain Poher	Democratic Centre (CD)	
1977-1986	Jacques Carat	Socialist Party (PS)	
1977-1986	Michel Giraud	Rally for the Republic (RPR)	
1977-1986	Charles Lederman	French Communist Party (PCF)	
1977-1986	Hélène Luc	French Communist Party (PCF)	
1977-1986	Alain Poher	Democratic Centre (CD)	
1977-1986	Marcel Rosette	French Communist Party (PCF)	
1986-1995	Jacques Carat	Socialist Party (PS)	
1986-1995	Jean Clouet	Republican Party (PR)	
1986-1995	Michel Giraud	Groupe du Rassemblement pour la République	Resigned 1988 (elected deputy 12 June 1988)
1986-1995	Lucien Lanier	Rally for the Republic (RPR)	Replaced Michel Giraud on 4 October 1988
1986-1995	Charles Lederman	French Communist Party (PCF)	
1986-1995	Hélène Luc	French Communist Party (PCF)	
1986-1995	Alain Poher	Union for French Democracy (UDF)	
1995-2004	Jean Clouet	Union for French Democracy (UDF)	
1995-2004	René Rouquet	Groupe socialiste	Resigned (elected deputy on 1 June 1997)
1995-2004	Serge Lagauche	Socialist Party (PS)	Replaced René Rouquet on 15 October 1997
1995-2004	Lucien Lanier	Rally for the Republic (RPR)	
1995-2004	Hélène Luc	French Communist Party (PCF)	
1995-2004	Jean-Marie Poirier	Union for French Democracy (UDF)	
1995-2004	Claude Billard	Groupe communiste républicain citoyen et écologiste	Resigned (elected deputy on 1 June 1997).
1995-2004	Odette Terrade	French Communist Party (PCF)	Replaced Claude Billard on 13 June 1997
2004-2011	Christian Cambon	Union for a Popular Movement (UMP)	
2004-2011	Jean-Jacques Jégou	Union for French Democracy (UDF)	
2004-2011	Serge Lagauche	Socialist Party (PS)	
2004-2011	Catherine Procaccia	Union for a Popular Movement (UMP)	
2004-2011	Jean-François Voguet	French Communist Party (PCF)	
2004-2011	Hélène Luc	Groupe communiste républicain citoyen et écologiste	resigned 18 September 2007
2004-2011	Odette Terrade	French Communist Party (PCF)	replaced Hélène Luc on 19 September 2007
2011-2017	Esther Benbassa	Europe Ecology – The Greens (EELV)	
2011-2017	Christian Cambon	Union for a Popular Movement (UMP)	
2011-2017	Luc Carvounas	Groupe socialiste et républicain	Resigned (elected deputy on 18 June 2017)
2011-2017	Laurent Dutheil	Socialist Party (PS)	Replaced Luc Carvounas on 29 July 2017
2011-2017	Laurence Cohen	French Communist Party (PCF)	
2011-2017	Christian Favier	French Communist Party (PCF)	
2011-2017	Catherine Procaccia	Union for a Popular Movement (UMP)	
From 2017	Christian Cambon	Groupe Les Républicains	
From 2017	Laurence Cohen	Groupe communiste républicain citoyen et écologiste	
From 2017	Laurent Lafon	Groupe Union Centriste	
From 2017	Catherine Procaccia	Groupe Les Républicains	
From 2017	Pascal Savoldelli	Groupe communiste républicain citoyen et écologiste	
From 2017	Sophie Taillé-Polian	Groupe socialiste et républicain	

== Sources ==
- Liste des anciens sénateurs de la Vème République par circonscription (in French), Sénat de France
- Liste par département - Val-de-Marne (in French), Sénat de France
