= Marie Tumba Nzeza =

Congolese politician (born 2000)

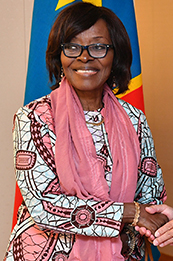

Minister of Foreign Affairs of the Democratic Republic of Congo
- In office 9 September 2019 – 12 April 2021
- Preceded by: Franck Mwe di Malila
- Succeeded by: Christophe Lutundula

Personal details
- Education: Université libre de Bruxelles

Marie Tumba Nzeza is a Congolese politician and diplomat. She served as the Minister of Foreign Affairs of the Democratic Republic of Congo in Prime Minister Sylvestre Ilunga's cabinet from September 2019 to April 2021. Previously, she was deputy secretary general of the Union for Democracy and Social Progress (UDPS), responsible for foreign affairs.

== Biography ==
Marie Tumba Nzeza studied at the Université libre de Bruxelles in Belgium, where she earned a degree in social sciences. She then worked in the field of international relations between the DR Congo and Canada. During the Conférence nationale souveraine (CNS) period in the early 1990s, she was very involved politically. She was an activist against the Popular Movement of the Revolution, the Unity Party, and headed the CNS Commission on Foreign Policy. In 1991, Prime Minister Jean Nguza Karl-I-Bond offered her a ministerial post in his government, which she declined. She then joined the Union for Democracy and Social Progress (UDPS), the party of former opponent Etienne Tshisekedi, with whom she actively campaigned. At the request of his son, Félix Tshisekedi, she became deputy secretary general of the party in May 2018, responsible for foreign policy.

=== Foreign minister ===
Following the election of Felix Tshisekedi as president, she was appointed Minister of Foreign Affairs in the Ilunga government on 26 August 2019, having been preferred to Aimé Boji, the former brother-in-law of Vital Kamerhe (the president's chief of staff). She is the second woman to hold this position after Ekila Liyonda (1987), and held the largest portfolio among women appointed in this government. She officially took office on 9 September succeeding Franck Mwe di Malila, who served as interim minister.
