= Odette (given name) =

Odette is a French given name; Old German name Oda + diminutive -tte; a female form of Odo, Odet.

People named Odette include:

- Odette de Champdivers (c. 1390 – c. 1425), chief mistress of King Charles VI of France
- Odette Annable (born 1985), American actress
- Odette Babandoa Etoa (born 1961), Congolese politician
- Odette Bancilhon (1908–1998), French astronomer
- Odette Barencey (1893–1981), French film actress
- Odette Barsa (1901–1975), American lingerie designer
- Odette Bergoffen (1924–2026), French resistance fighter
- Odette Cortez (born 1987), Panamanian choreographer, dancer and folklorist
- Odette Drand (1927–2019), French fencer
- Odette Dulac (1865–1939), French actress and singer
- Odette England (born 1975), Australian-British photographer
- Odette Le Fontenay (1885–1965), French opera singer, voice teacher
- Odette Gartenlaub (1922–2014), French pianist, music teacher and composer
- Odette Giuffrida (born 1994), Italian judoka
- Odette Hallowes (also known as Odette Sansom and Odette Churchill; 1912–1995), British spy
- Odette Herviaux (born 1948), French politician
- Odette Joyeux (1914–2000), French actress, playwright and novelist
- Odette Kahn (1923–1982), French wine critic
- Odette Kervorcʻh (1915–2010), French resistance fighter and anarchist activist
- Odette Krempin (1976–2016), Zairian fashion designer and socialite
- Odette Lapierre (born 1955), Canadian marathoner
- Odette Laure (1917–2004), French actress and singer
- Odette Lavigne, Canadian politician from Quebec
- Odette Lusien (1927–2007), French swimmer
- Odette Mennesson-Rigaud (1907–1990), French and Haitian ethnographer
- Odette Mistoul (born 1959), Gabonese shot putter
- Odette Monard (1903–1989), French swimmer
- Odette Myrtil (1898–1978), French-born American actress and musician
- Odette Ntahonvukiye (born 1994), Burundian judoka
- Odette Nyiramilimo (born 1956), Rwandan physician and politician
- Odette Palma (born 1982), Chilean hammer thrower
- Odette Pavlova (born 1994), Russian fashion model
- Odette Piñeiro Caballero, Puerto Rican politician
- Odette Richard (1988–2020), South African rhythmic gymnast
- Odette Roy Fombrun (1917–2022), Haitian writer and intellectual
- Odette Siko, French auto racing driver
- Odette Tchernine, writer
- Odette Teissier du Cros (1906–1997), French ethnologist, curator
- Odette Terrade (born 1949), French politician
- Odette Valery (1883–?), Italian dancer
- Odette Vidal de Oliveira (1930–1939), Brazilian child saint
