= Philomène Omatuku Atshakawo Akatshi =

Congolese politician

Philomène Omatuku Atshakawo Akatshi is a politician from the Democratic Republic of the Congo.

== Career ==
She served as Minister for Women's Affairs in 2007 under President Joseph Kabila and Prime Minister Antoine Gizenga. In Gizenga's second cabinet she held the post of "Ministre de Genre, de la Famille et de l'Enfant": Minister for Gender, the Family and the Child.

== See also ==
- Christophe Mboso N'Kodia Pwanga
- Jeannine Mabunda
- Gabriel Kyungu wa Kumwanza
