= Sam Bokolombe =

Congolese politician

Member of the National Assembly
- Constituency: Basankusu Equateur

Personal details
- Party: Union for the Congolese Nation

Sam Bokolombe Batuli is a Congolese politician and Union for the Congolese Nation Member of the National Assembly of the Democratic Republic of the Congo.

Bokolombe is also a member of the political bureau for Together for Change, the opposition political coalition formed by former Katanga governor Moïse Katumbi to support his presidential bid in the upcoming 2018 presidential election.
