= Joseph Kasongo =

Congolese lawyer, businessman and politician

The Honourable Joseph Kasongo
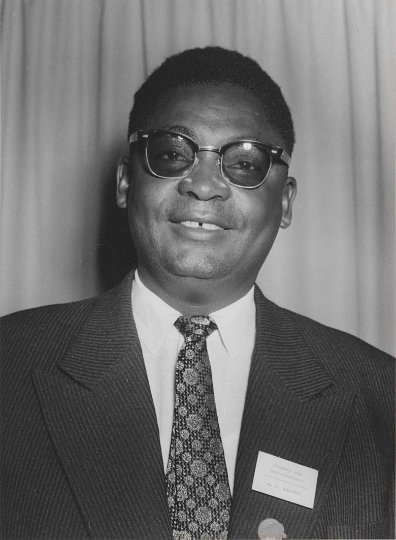
- Kasongo at the Belgo-Congolese Round Table Conference, 1960

President of the Chamber of Deputies of the Republic of the Congo
- In office 21 June 1960 – 13 September 1960
- Deputy: Louis Mulunda; Joseph Midiburo
- Preceded by: position established
- In office 24 July 1961 – March 1962
- Succeeded by: Yvon Kimpiobi

Deputy Prime Minister for Economic Coordination of the Republic of the Congo
- In office 17 April 1963 – June 1964
- Prime Minister: Cyrille Adoula

Personal details
- Born: 25 December 1919 Dar es Salaam, Tanganyika
- Died: 19 October 1990 (aged 70) Bunia, Zaire
- Party: Mouvement National Congolais (1958–1963); Mouvement National Congolais-Kasongo (1963–?)

Joseph-Georges Kasongo (25 December 1919 – 19 October 1990) was a Tanganyikan-born Congolese lawyer, businessman, and politician who served as the first President of the Chamber of Deputies of the Republic of the Congo (today the Democratic Republic of the Congo). He later held office as a deputy prime minister and as a senator.

Kasongo was born in 1919 in Dar es Salaam to a family with ties to the Maniema region in the Belgian Congo. Following his education he took up work in business and in the indigenous courts in Stanleyville. In the late 1950s he became a leader in Patrice Lumumba's Mouvement National Congolais (MNC) party and worked to expand its influence. In 1960 the Congo became independent and Kasongo was elected to the Chamber of Deputies, shortly thereafter becoming its president. Lumumba became Prime Minister, but later that year he was removed from office as the country became embroiled in a political crisis. Parliament was also adjourned. Kasongo remained loyal to Lumumba and demanded that Parliament reconvene. In July 1961 he was reelected President of the Chamber, serving in the post until March 1962. The following year he became Deputy Prime Minister for Economic Coordination under the leadership of Cyrille Adoula, but was then ejected from the MNC. Kasongo formed a splinter group from the party and in 1966 he became a member of the Senate. He died in 1990 while trying to reestablish the MNC.

== Biography ==
=== Early life ===
Joseph Kasongo was born on 25 December 1919 in Dar es Salaam, Tanganyika. His family was part of the Kusu tribe of the Tetela ethnic group and came from the village of Lukonge, Aluba chieftaincy, Kibombo Territory, Maniema, Belgian Congo. Due to his family's Muslim background, Kasongo was a firm supporter of anti-clericalism and opposed the Catholic Church's political influence in the Congo. He conducted three years of business studies and four years of legal studies. Afterwards he worked as a businessman and an advocate in the indigenous courts of Stanleyville, Belgian Congo. The latter included work as a court secretary. Kasongo was also a member of several mutual organisations and trade associations. Around 1950 he served as president of the Élisabethville chapter of the Association des Batetela, a Tetela ethnic organisation. In 1955 the population of the Mangobo district appealed to the colonial authorities to appoint him to the communal council, (Note: A communal council was a board of government for a commune, an administrative division of a city or town.) which they refused. The following year Kasongo was elected to the central committee of the Cercle Belgo-Congolais and served as its assistant secretary. In February 1958 he was appointed bailiff on the Stanleyville Territorial Tribunal by the local territorial administrator.

=== Entry into politics ===
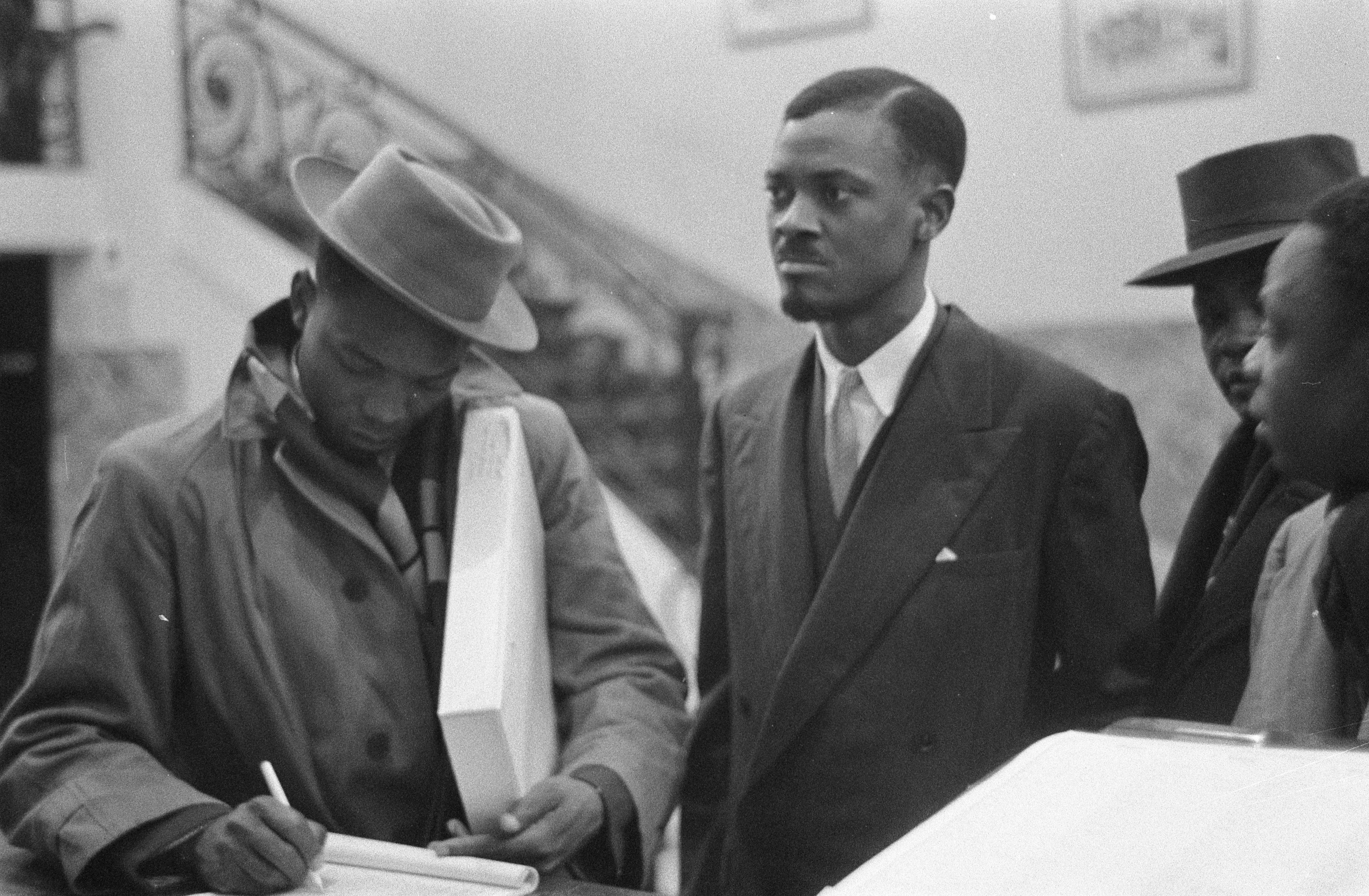
Patrice Lumumba (centre) and Kasongo (right, wearing hat) at the Belgo-Congolese Round Table Conference

In 1957 the Belgian colonial administration instituted reforms that permitted municipal elections and the formation of political parties. The following year Kasongo's friend, Patrice Lumumba, created the Mouvement National Congolais (MNC), a nationalist organisation, and tasked him and several others to form a central committee. On 15 May 1959 Kasongo was elected president of the Orientale Province's chapter of the MNC. Proving himself to be an effective propagandist, he successfully expanded the MNC's influence throughout the region. Together with other party officers, he oversaw the establishment of branches in Stanleyville's communes, neighboring towns, and some locales in Kivu Province. In October he participated in a nationalist congress in Stanleyville. In December Kasongo was elected communal councilor of Mangobo, 776 votes to his opponent's 146. The civil unrest that had surfaced during the year caused the Belgian government to arrange a round table conference in Brussels to discuss the political future of the Congo. Kasongo was invited to attend as a delegate for the MNC but threatened to boycott the conference unless Lumumba, who had been arrested and imprisoned, was allowed to go as well. The Belgian government eventually gave in and both attended the conference. Kasongo served on the conference's bureau. The Belgians and Congolese reached an agreement whereby the Congo would be granted independence on 30 June 1960. General elections for a newly-constituted Parliament took place in May.

=== Government career ===
In the May elections Kasongo won a seat in the Chamber of Deputies on an MNC ticket as a representative from the Haut-Congo constituency with 2,429 preferential votes. On 21 June the Chamber selected him to be its first president, beating Jean Bolikango in a vote 74 to 58. (Note: According to Kent, the result was facilitated by the bribing of 13 deputies by Jacques Lumbala, an ally of Lumumba, who would have otherwise been partial to Bolikango.) He presided over the joint-session of Parliament that elected the Congo's first head of state and the country's formal independence ceremony that took place on 30 June 1960 at the Palais de la Nation, which included Prime Minister Lumumba's controversial Congolese Independence Speech. Kasongo also served as the chairman of the Chamber's constitutional commission. On 9 July he went to Stanleyville to assist in overseeing the Africanisation of the local army garrison. Later that month he traveled with Lumumba to the Headquarters of the United Nations in the United States.

On 5 September the President of the Congo, Joseph Kasa-Vubu, dismissed Lumumba, but Lumumba refused to leave office. Kasongo played a key role in attempting to reconcile the two to avoid a political impasse. (Note: According to Makombo, on 7 September Kasongo became a member of an "arbitration commission" established by Parliament to mediate the dispute. However, Hoskyns and Artigue do not list him as a member of the commission.) On 14 September Joseph-Désiré Mobutu launched a coup that removed Lumumba from power and adjourned Parliament. In October Kasongo was made a member of a commission assembled by Lumumba (Note: Though deposed, Lumumba still claimed to hold the premiership and behaved accordingly.) tasked with managing his relations with the United Nations Operation in the Congo. Kasongo reached an agreement in mid-December to work under the new leadership of Joseph Iléo. He then attended a Francophone-African conference in Brazzaville where foreign diplomats attempted to provide mediation between the Congolese factions. However, by January 1961 Mobutu's government of commissioners was foundering due to financial problems and Kasongo angrily demanded that Lumumba be restored to the premiership. When proposals were made to have the dispute over governance settled in a round table discussion, Kasongo rejected the idea and demanded for Parliament's powers to be restored. Instead of attending the Round Table Conference of Léopoldville later that month he sent the participants a memorandum. On 17 January Lumumba was killed in Katanga; his death was announced in February.

"The Congolese Parliament has never betrayed the ideas of Lumumba. If ensured real security in its work, the Congolese Parliament members this time will once again raise their weighty voices in defence of the republic, its unity and its indivisibility."

— Joseph Kasongo's statement to a foreign correspondent, June 1961

In mid-February the United Nations (UN) established a program by which potential political targets could seek military protection in designated facilities. Kasongo was the first person to accommodate himself in the service. Deputy Prime Minister Bolikango personally requested that he return to his residence under government protection, but Kasongo chose to remain with his family in a UN-guarded facility. In June 1961 he went to Stanleyville to meet with his political allies. Parliament reconvened the following month at Lovanium University under the temporary chairmanship of Kasongo. The deputies who had supported Lumumba coalesced into the Bloc Nationaliste, and he acted as one of its leaders. On 24 July the Chamber of Deputies held its first independent session and reelected Kasongo President, 61 votes to 57. He served in the role until March 1962. On 18 December he levied an interpellation against the Minister of Public Function concerning the politicisation of government services. Three days later he filed another against the Minister of Transport, requesting an explanation for the mismanagement of state transportation companies.

On 17 April 1963 Kasongo was made Deputy Prime Minister with responsibility for the Economic Coordination portfolio in Cyrille Adoula's new government. (Note: According to Ludo Martens, by accepting the position in Adoula's government, Kasongo "confirmed [his] passage into the camp of the monopoly bourgeoisie".) That same month the MNC central committee, under the control of radical Christophe Gbenye, ejected Kasongo from the party. Kasongo subsequently formed his own wing of the MNC. He criticised the old party leadership for forgoing electoral organisation and strategy in favor of advocating dissent and rebellion. On 24 January 1966 he was elected by the Maniema provincial assembly by a margin of 3 votes to serve as a senator. The Senate confirmed his co-optation on 11 March. At the end of July 1967 he was appointed second vice president of the Association pour la Promotion et la Défense des Intérêts des Commerçants Congolais-Ngaliema committee.

=== Later life ===
Kasongo died on 19 October 1990 in Bunia while working to revitalise the MNC.
