= Jean-Marie Bamporiki =

Congolese politician

Member of the National Assembly
- Constituency: Kabare

Personal details
- Party: Union for the Congolese Nation

Jean-Marie Bamporiki Manegabe is a Congolese politician and Union for the Congolese Nation Member of the National Assembly of the Democratic Republic of the Congo.
