= Kizito Mushizi =

Member of the National Assembly
- Constituency: Bukavu

Personal details
- Party: Union for the Congolese Nation

Kizito Mushizi Nfundiko is a Congolese politician and Union for the Congolese Nation Member of the National Assembly of the Democratic Republic of the Congo.
