= Jason Luneno =

Congolese politician

Member of the National Assembly
- Constituency: Goma

Personal details
- Party: Union for the Congolese Nation

Jason Luneno Maene is a Congolese politician and Union for the Congolese Nation Member of the National Assembly of the Democratic Republic of the Congo.
