= Christophe Lutundula =

Honorable Christophe Lutundula Apala Pen'apala
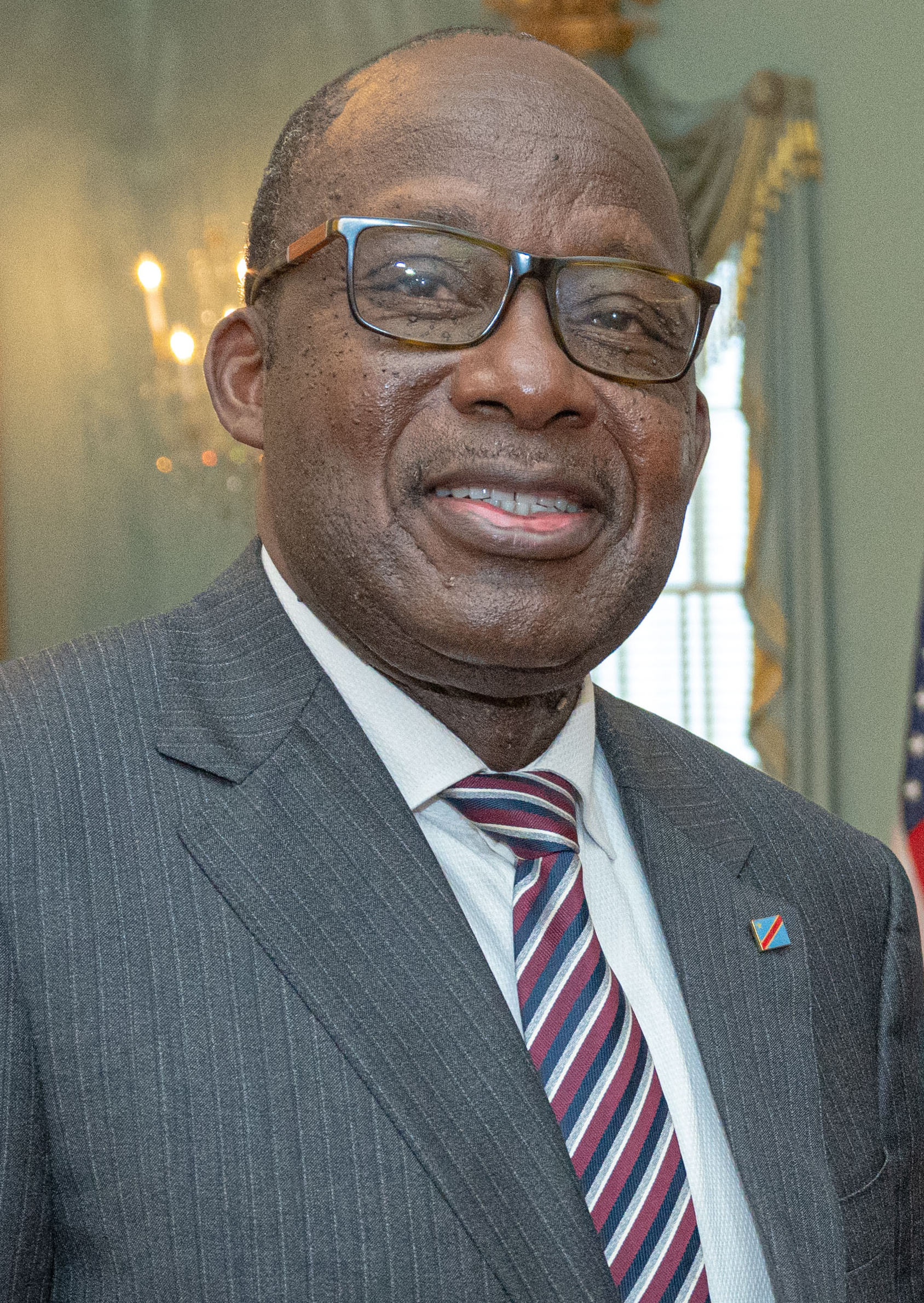
- Christophe Lutundula in 2022

Minister of Foreign Affairs of the Democratic Republic of Congo
- In office 12 April 2021 – 13 June 2024
- Preceded by: Marie Tumba Nzeza
- Succeeded by: Thérèse Kayikwamba Wagner

Deputy
- President: Joseph Kabila
- Prime Minister: Matata Ponyo Mapon

President ad interim of the Assembly
- In office March 25, 2009 – April 18, 2009
- Preceded by: Vital Kamerhe
- Succeeded by: Évariste Boshab

Second vice-president of the High Council of the Républic - Transition Parliament (HCR-PT)

First vice-president of the National Assembly

Christophe Lutundula Apala Pen'apala is a member of the National Assembly of the Democratic Republic of the Congo and the Deputy President of the Assembly.

== Career ==
On March 25, 2009, he became President ad interim of the Assembly following the resignation of Vital Kamerhe. He was succeeded by Évariste Boshab on April 18, 2009. He was appointed Vice-Premier minister/Minister of Foreign Affairs on April 12, 2021 in the new government of Sama Lukonde.

== Lutundula Commission ==
Lutundula helped create the Lutundula Commission, an important investigation by the post-war transition government into mining contracts signed by both rebels and government employees with mining companies during both the First and Second Congo Wars.

The commission recommended suspending new contracting during the transition, but this suggestion was ignored. The government signed several new contracts with multinationals, mostly forming joint ventures with one of the government enterprises in the sector such as Gécamines, Societé Minière de Bakwanga (MIBO) and Kilo-Moto Mining Company (OKIMO).

== See also ==
- Conflict resource
- Corruption in the Democratic Republic of the Congo

Political offices
Preceded by Marie Tumba Nzeza	Foreign minister of the Democratic Republic of the Congo; 2021–2024	Succeeded by Thérèse Kayikwamba Wagner
