= Edouard Kiove Kola =

Congolese politician

Minister of Justice
- Incumbent
- Assumed office 19 December 2016
- Prime Minister: Samy Badibanga

Member of the National Assembly
- Constituency: Lubero

Personal details
- Party: Union for the Congolese Nation

Edouard Kiove Kola is a Congolese politician who has been Minister of Justice in the Cabinet of the Democratic Republic of the Congo since December 2016. He is a Union for the Congolese Nation Member of the National Assembly.
