= Eric Katolo =

Member of the National Assembly
- Constituency: Mweneditu

Personal details
- Party: Union for the Congolese Nation

Eric Katolo Kabongo is a Congolese politician and Union for the Congolese Nation Member of the National Assembly of the Democratic Republic of the Congo.
