= Odette Babandoa Etoa =

Congolese politician

Minister of Transport and Communications
- In office 14 March 1999 – 2 September 2000
- President: Laurent-Désiré Kabila

Personal details
- Born: 11 January 1961 (age 65) Aketi, Orientale, Republic of the Congo

Odette Babandoa Etoa (born 11 January 1961) is a Congolese opposition politician and former government minister.

== Early life and education ==
Odette Babandoa Etoa was born in Aketi in Orientale Province on 11 January 1961. She studied law.

== Career ==
Babandoa Etoa is a member of the Kinshasa Bar. She has worked as a magistrate and legal advisor to the Prime Minister's office. She was appointed Deputy General and the Chairperson of the Bas-Uele Railway Board.

She is the President of the UPR (Patriotic Union for the Republic, party presently in the opposition in the DRCongo).

In 1999, she was appointed Minister of Transport and Communications by President Laurent-Désiré Kabila.

In July 2000, she and her husband were arrested and accused of accepting bribes from a foreign country after meetings with senior Canadian government officials including David Kilgour and the awarding of a $41.5million contract to Quebec company Navigation Aeronav. However, the Canadian company denied any bribes had been offered, and others said she had been targeted for trying to expose corruption in Kabila's government. Three other ministers had been arrested in the preceding weeks.

She was released a day after her arrest on 7 July, and then arrested again on 13 July and released on 21 July. Her husband was tried for "treason in war-time" for allowing journalists hostile to the regime to use his office. He was sentenced to one year in jail but was released on provisional bail in August 2000.

Since her departure from government, Babandoa Etoa has served as President of the Forum of Women Lawyers. She spoke out against corruption and flaws in the 2006 electoral process. In 2011, she criticised Joseph Kabila and irregularities in the presidential election that she said contravened the constitution.

In April 2011, Babandoa Etoa joined Vital Kamerhe's opposition party Union for the Congolese Nation, later becoming Secretary General of the party. She is sometimes referred to as "Joan of Arc" or the "Iron Lady". As of 2016 she is also the "moral authority" of the Union for the Republic in the Democratic Republic of the Congo.

In January 2016, she called on the Independent National Electoral Commission to fully assume its independence by publishing a detailed electoral calendar.

== Personal life ==
Babandoa Etoa is married to lawyer Nicolas Okende Katako and has six children.
