= Bertin Mwamba =

Congolese politician (born 1932)

Minister for the Post Office, Telegraphs and Telecommunications
- In office November 1965 – 18 December 1966

President of the Chamber of Deputies of the Democratic Republic of the Congo
- In office November 1962 – March 1963
- Preceded by: Yvon Kimpiobi
- Succeeded by: Joseph Midiburo

Personal details
- Born: 25 September 1932 (age 93) Songa, Belgian Congo
- Party: Confédération des associations tribales du Katanga

Bertin Mwamba or Mwamba Maleba Banze Kabombo (born 25 September 1932) is a Congolese politician who served as the third President of the Chamber of Deputies of the Democratic Republic of the Congo.

== Early life ==
Bertin Mwamba was born on 25 September 1932 in Songa, Belgian Congo into a Luba family. He received three years of secondary education at the Ecole des Moniteurs. He worked as a teacher from 1953 until 1957, when he became a chartered accountant, holding the latter job until 1960.

Mwamba participated in the economic portion of the Belgo-Congolese Round Table Conference in Brussels from April to May 1960. He was a member of the Confédération des associations tribales du Katanga (CONAKAT) party and led its chapter in Kamina. In anticipation of the May 1960 general elections in the Congo, Mwamba directed the party's campaigning efforts in the town.

Without many resources to organise the local campaign, he appealed to the local electorate by saying that CONAKAT would serve as a bulwark against domination from the neighbouring Kasai region.

== Career ==
Mwamba was elected to the Chamber of Deputies in the election, representing the Haut-Lomami constituency in Katanga Province. Though a member of CONAKAT, he had political differences with party leader Moïse Tshombe. Thus even though Katanga had seceded under Tshombe's direction, Mwamba returned to his seat in Parliament in August 1961.

In March 1962, he ran as the parliamentary opposition's candidate to be President of the Chamber. He lost the Chamber vote, 51 to 59.

In November, he successfully secured the office and held it until March 1963. In April, following the termination of the Katangese secession, Prime Minister Cyrille Adoula reshuffled his government and appointed Mwamba Deputy Minister of Foreign Affairs. He was re-elected to the Chamber in 1965.

That November, Joseph-Désiré Mobutu took power in a coup. Mwamba was appointed Minister for the Post Office, Telegraphs and Telecommunications, and he held the post until a cabinet reshuffle on 18 December 1966. On 18 January, 1967, he was arrested on charges of embezzling $570,000 of government profits from stamp resells while in office.

== Later life ==
Mwamba later involved himself in commerce and agriculture. In 1982, he was elected Haut-Lomami Commissar for the Legislative Council with 19,814 votes. He was a member of the Political, Administrative and Judiciary Committee of the Subcommittee on Justice and worked on the parliamentary group for environmental issues.
