= Édouard Mwe di Malila Apenela =

Édouard Lendje Héritier Mwe di Malila Apenela (13 October 1937 – 5 June 2014) was a Congolese businessman, founder and president of the Woyo Alliance, former president and donator of the football club AS Dragons.

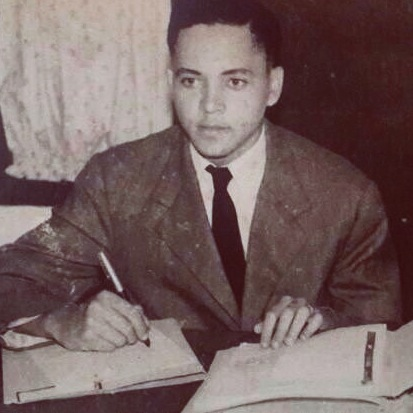

== Personal ==
Édouard Mwe di Malila Apenela was born in Moanda, territory of Bas-Congo. He was son to a Congolese woman and man from Switzerland. His second name Héritier is dedicated to his biological father. Due to his mother he belonged to the Woyo tribe, which members are present in Cabinda and Congo. This was also the territory of the Ngoyo-Kingdom in which the ruler and nobles held the title, "Mwe", "Mwene" or "Ma". His name "Mwe di" literally means "Lord of", an honorable particule. He worked in the estate industry and owned several buildings in the city center of Kinshasa. Mwe di Malila Apenela had numerous children, among them the current deputy minister of international relations and national integration Franck Mwe di Malila. The living in Germany Artist Jonathan Mwe di Malila also belongs to his descendants (grandson).

== AS Dragons ==
Édouard Mwe di Malila Apenela started managing the AS Dragons in 1969. By his arrival he acquainted players like Pembele Ngunza, Magie Mafwala and Romain Bamuleke. In 1985 he gave instructions to AS Dragons, now called Bilima. Also, through his engagement the team could win the Congolese championship. Thanks to his moral and financial contribution, Bilima could play the second time in its history: the 22nd African Cup against the Forces Armées Royales du Maroc, in 1986, in the state of Kenya in Lubumbashi (Katanga). Later he left the head of the sport commission to pass on the control to others. He remained active as donator of the club and as their president of supreme committee.

== Additional information ==
Mwe di Malila died on 5 June 2014. He left his many children a huge estate empire which caused a big argument among them. Only four of his children have themselves declared as his only legitimate successor and heirs. This case is treated by the High Court in Kinshasa Gombe. Because of his good reputation and popularity the Congolese singer Kwamy, wrote a song which is dedicated to Mwe di Malila after his death and named "Véa Mokonzi" Mokonzi is Lingala and means as such as king or leader.
