= Aimé Boji =

Congolese politician

President of the National Assembly of the Democratic Republic of the Congo
- Incumbent
- Assumed office 13 November 2025
- Preceded by: Vital Kamerhe

Member of the National Assembly
- Incumbent
- Assumed office January 2024
- Constituency: Walungu
- In office 30 July 2006 – February 2019

Minister of Industry
- In office 8 August 2025 – 20 October 2025

Minister of Budget
- In office April 2021 – 8 August 2025

Minister of Foreign Trade
- In office 19 December 2016 – 2017

Personal details
- Party: Union for the Congolese Nation
- Education: Oxford Brookes University; University of East Anglia

Aimé Boji Sangara Bamanyirue is a Congolese politician who has been president of the National Assembly since 13 November 2025. He was a Union for the Congolese Nation Member of the National Assembly representing Walungu from 2006 to 2019, and was reelected in the same constituency at the 2023 general election.

He was educated at Collège Alfajiri in Bukavu, Oxford Brookes University (BSc Economics, Business Administration and Management, 1994), the Refugee Studies Centre, and the University of East Anglia (MA Development Economics, 1997). He has been Permanent Secretary of the UNC's National Policy Directorate since 2011. He was formerly Congolese Minister of Foreign Trade, Minister of Budget, and Minister of Industry. He was previously aligned to the People's Party for Reconstruction and Democracy. He is the brother-in-law of Vital Kamerhe.
