= AS Dragons (Kinshasa) =

Football club in the Democratic Republic of the Congo

- Full name: Amicale Sportive Dragons
- Founded: 1938; 88 years ago
- Ground: Stade Cardinal Malula; Kinshasa, DR Congo
- Capacity: 24,000
- Chairman: Édouard Mwe di Malila Apenela
- Manager: Lili Lumande
- League: Linafoot Ligue 2
- 2018–19: Linafoot, 15th, Relegated

Amicale Sportive Dragons is a Congolese football club based in Kinshasa. As of the 2007–08 season they play in the Linafoot league, the top level of professional football in DR Congo. Their home games are played at Stade 24 Novembre. In the past, the club was also called Amicale Sportive Bilima.

== History ==
The club was founded in 1938 under the name AS Bilima. After the independence of the country from Belgium in June 1960, the team developed into a leading Club, which was proved when it won its first championship in 1965. Subsequently, a domination between the trio AS Vita Club, Imana Kinshasa and Tout Puissant Mazembe developed which was hard to break. 1969 the congolese businessman Edouard Mwe di Malila Apenela started managing As Dragons as their president and donator. By his arrival he brought players like Pembele Ngunze, Magie Mafwala and Romain Bamuleke. Thanks to his financial and moral engagement the team could reach the finals of the African Cup of Champions Clubs, after its second championship title 1979 and 1980. The Cameroonian opponent Canon Yaoundé could win the finals. After a further title 1982 the team gild its fourth championship title by reaching again the finals 1984 in the African Cup of Champions Clubs. But the opponent FAR Rabatt was too strong. In the 1990s the club was named Amicale Sportive Bilima, simply AS Bilima and won for several times the Coupe du Congo. But the team couldn't tie on the former achievements. Later the businessman Edouard Mwe di Malila Apenela left the title of president to pass on the control to others. He remains in the club as donator and as the president of the supreme committee. Currently Lili Lumande is the president of the club.

== Honours ==
- African Cup of Champions Clubs

Finalist : 1980, 1985

- Linafoot: 4

1965, 1979, 1982, 1984

- Coupe du Congo: 5

1965, 1996, 1997, 1998, 1999

- DR Congo Super Cup: 1

1997

- Coupe de l'Indépendance: 1

1997

- EPFKIN (Kinshasa): 9

1948, 1951, 1952, 1960, 1964, 1966, 1978, 1981, 1983

- Linafoot Ligue 2: 1

2105 (Zone West)

== Performance in CAF competitions ==
- African Cup of Champions Clubs: 4 appearances

1966: First Round
1980: Finalist
1983: Quarter-Finals
1985: Finalist

- CAF Cup Winners' Cup: 4 appearances

1997 – withdrew in Second Round
1998 – Second Round
1999 – Quarter-Finals
2000 – First Round
