= Stade Cardinal Malula =

Stadium in Kinshasa, Democratic Republic of the Congo

Coordinates: 4°19′22″S 15°18′45″E

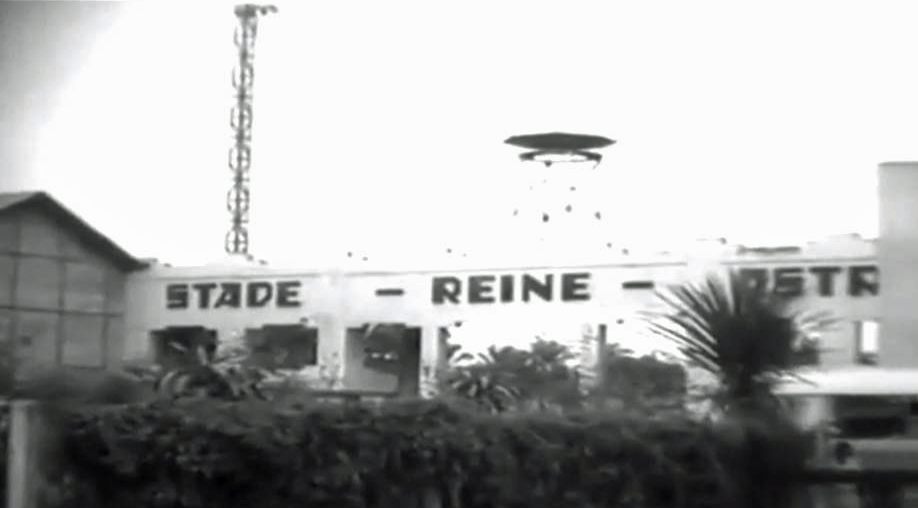
- Interactive map of Stade Cardinal Malula
- Full name: Stade Cardinal Malula
- Former names: Stade du 24 Novembre; Stade Reine Astrid
- Location: (Democratic Republic of the Congo) Kinshasa, Congo DR
- Capacity: 24,000

Construction
- Opened: 1937

Tenant
- AS Dragons

Stade Cardinal Malula, formerly known as Stade 24 Novembre and before Stade Reine Astrid, is a stadium located in Kinshasa, Democratic Republic of the Congo. It opened in 1937 and serves as the home of AS Dragons.

It is currently named in honor of Joseph Malula, Archbishop of Kinshasa from 1964 to his death in 1989. It was before named of the date Mobutu Sese Seko seized power in the country in 1965 and previously named after Astrid of Sweden, Queen consort of the Belgians, when Congo was a Belgian colony.
