= Yvon Kimpiobi =

President of the Chamber of Deputies of the Democratic Republic of the Congo
- In office 6 March 1962 – November 1962
- Preceded by: Joseph Kasongo
- Succeeded by: Bertin Mwamba
- In office September 1965 – June 1967
- Preceded by: Joseph Midiburo
- Succeeded by: position disestablished

Personal details
- Born: 1 June 1923; Kikongo-Mitshakila, Kwango, Belgian Congo
- Died: 4 September 2009 (aged 86); Kinshasa, Democratic Republic of the Congo
- Political party: Parti Solidaire Africain; Convention Nationale Congolaise; Mouvement Populaire de la Révolution (1968–?)

Yvon Kimpiobi or Kimpiob-Ninafiding Nki-Ekundi (1 June 1923 – 4 September 2009) was a Congolese politician who served twice as the President of the Chamber of Deputies of the Democratic Republic of the Congo.

== Early life ==
Yvon Kimpiobi was born on 1 June 1923 in Kikongo-Mitshakila (near Bulungu, Bandundu), Kwango, Belgian Congo to Dias Suing Mabong Ngul Mun and Nkubiya Nazur of the Mbel clan of the Yansi people. He undertook six years of primary studies and six years of commercial and administrative studies in Leverville before entering the workforce. In 1943 he became an accounting clerk at Huileries et Plantations du Kwango in Fumu-Mputu, Masi-Manimba Territory. Six years later he was hired by Almeida Frères in Kikwit. Kimpiobi served there until 1952 when he became a clerk in the colonial administration attached to the secretariat of Kwango Province (reformed as Kwilu in 1954).

== Political career ==
In the 1957 municipal elections Kimpiobi won the office of Chef de Centre extra-coutumier de Kikwit, holding that position until 1960. Two years later he formed part of a Kwilu delegation of customary chiefs that met with the Belgian minister of colonies to discuss the Léopoldville riots.

In the Congo's first national elections in 1960 Kimpiobi was elected to the Chamber of Deputies as a representative from Kwilu Province and a member of the Parti Solidaire Africain (PSA) with 6,281 preferential votes. When the PSA split he aligned himself with Cléophas Kamitatu's moderate wing of the party. On 6 March 1962 he was elected President of the Chamber, defeating the parliamentary opposition candidate, 59 votes to 51. He held the office until November 1962. In September of that year he led a small parliamentary delegation on a good-will trip to the Republic of China. In 1965 he was reelected to the Chamber as a member of the new Convention Nationale Congolaise. He again served as President of the Chamber from that September until June 1967. That year the Chamber was dissolved, ending Kimpiobi's tenure as a national deputy. In June 1968 he was made a member of the political bureau of the Mouvement Populaire de la Révolution (MPR). In December 1970 the bureau was reorganised and he was dismissed from his position.

In 1997 Laurent-Désiré Kabila seized control of the Congo. Afterwards he created a commission to draft a new constitution for the country. Kimpiobi was appointed to the commission.

== Personal life ==
Kimpiobi was married and had a total of 20 children. In his later life he suffered from blindness and a severe illness, for which he received medical treatment in South Africa. He died in Kinshasa on 4 September 2009, at the age of 86.
