= Christian Cambon =

French politician (born 1948)

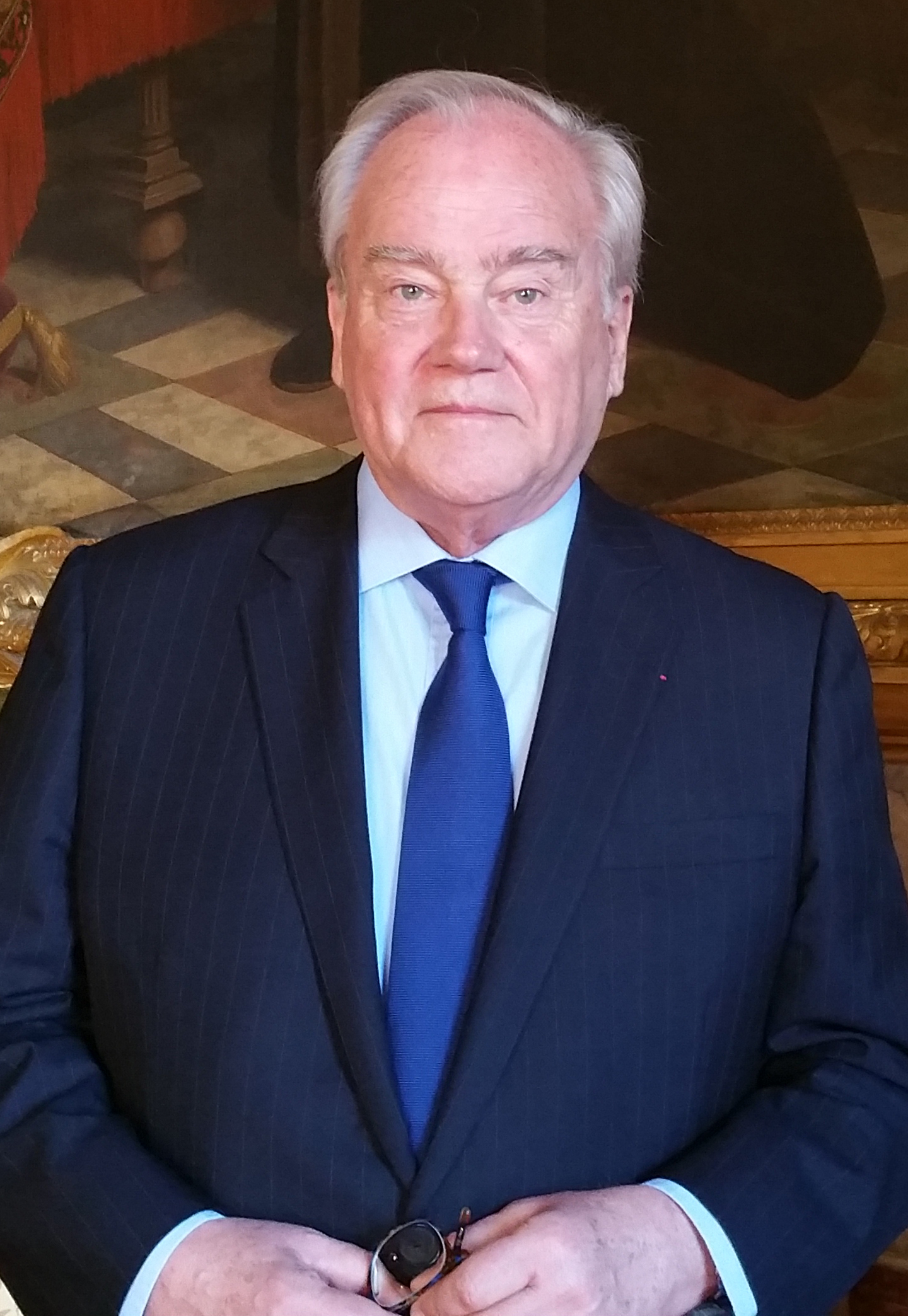

Senator for Val-de-Marne
- Incumbent
- Assumed office 1 October 2004

Mayor of Saint-Maurice
- In office 19 March 1989 – 14 October 2017
- Preceded by: Louis-François Manchon
- Succeeded by: Igor Semo

Member of the Regional Council of Île-de-France
- In office 16 March 1986 – 25 September 2004

Personal details
- Born: 8 March 1948 (age 78) Saint-Mandé, France
- Party: Union for French Democracy (until 2002); Union for a Popular Movement (2002–2015); The Republicans (2015–present)
- Education: Panthéon-Assas University; Sciences Po

Christian Cambon (French pronunciation: [kʁistjɑ̃ kɑ̃bɔ̃]; born 8 March 1948) is a French politician of The Republicans (LR) who has represented the Val-de-Marne department in the Senate since 2004.

== Early life and education ==
Cambon graduated from the Paris Institute of Political Studies (Sciences Po) and holds a master's degree in Public Law (Panthéon-Assas University).

== Political career ==
Cambon held the mayorship of Saint-Maurice, Val-de-Marne from 1989 until 2017 and was First Vice President of the Syndicat des eaux d'Île-de-France, the public drinking water service for the greater metropolitan Paris area, from 1983 to 2017.

In the Senate, Cambon served as president of the Committee on Foreign Affairs, Defense and the Armed Forces from 2017 to 2023. He also chairs the French-Moroccan parliamentary friendship group and the French delegation to the NATO Parliamentary Assembly.

On 24 April 2018, Cambon was among the guests invited to the state dinner hosted by US President Donald Trump in honour of President Emmanuel Macron at the White House.

== Other activities ==
- French Development Agency (AFD), Member of the Board of Directors

== Political positions ==
Following the 2023 Nigerien coup d'état, Cambon joined forces with fellow Senators Roger Karoutchi and Bruno Retailleau on an open letter to President Macron in Le Figaro, criticizing France's Africa policy and arguing that the failure of Operation Barkhane was in great part the reason why France and its economic, political and military presence have been rejected in Mali, Burkina Faso, Niger and the Central African Republic; the letter was signed by 91 other senators.
