= List of governors of Katanga =

Belgian Congo provinces in 1920

Belgian Congo provinces in 1933 after the District of Lomami was transferred to the new Kasaï Province

Katanga in the Democratic Republic of the Congo in 2015

This list of governors of Katanga includes governors or equivalent officeholders of the Katanga Province established in the Belgian Congo in 1910, and of successor provinces up to 29 October 2015, when Katanga was split into the provinces of Haut-Katanga, Haut-Lomami, Lualaba and Tanganyika.

On 1 October 1933 the original province of Katanga was renamed Elisabethville/Elisabethstad. The district of Lomami was transferred at this time to the new province of Lusambo (later named Kasaï), which had been formed from parts of the old Congo-Kasaï province. The province returned to the name of Katanga on 27 May 1947.

On 11 July 1960, a few days after the Congo Republic had gained independence, the province of Katanga seceded as an independent state. In November 1961 the northern portion was reconquered by the national government and made the province of Nord-Katanga. On 21 January 1963 the remainder of Katanga was reconquered and divided into the provinces of Lualaba and Katanga Oriental.

Nord-Katanga, Lualaba and Katanga Oriental were merged back into the province of Katanga on 28 December 1966. The province was renamed Shaba on 2 January 1972, then returned to the name of Katanga in 1997.

== Governors of Katanga / Elisabethville (1891–1960) ==
The governors (or equivalent) of Katanga province, renamed Elisabethville/Elisabethstad Province from 1 October 1933 to 27 May 1947, were:

Province	Start	End	Officeholder	Title
Katanga	1 September 1910	21 March 1917	Émile Wangermée	Governor and deputy governor-general
Katanga	1915	1917	Adolphe De Meulemeester	Interim governor
Katanga	22 March 1917	2 September 1920	Charles Tombeur	Governor and deputy governor-general
Katanga	September 1920	October 1921	Léopold De Koninck	Governor and deputy governor-general (acting)
Katanga	October 1921	23 December 1923	Martin Rutten	Governor and deputy governor-general
Katanga	December 1923	21 January 1928	Léon Guilain Bureau	Governor and deputy governor-general
Katanga	5 May 1928	September 1931	Gaston Heenen	Governor and deputy governor-general (1st time)
Katanga	1931	1931	Rodolphe Dufour	Interim governor
Katanga	September 1931	January 1932	Louis Joseph Postiaux	Governor and deputy governor-general
Katanga	January 1932	23 September 1933	Gaston Heenen	Governor and deputy governor-general (2nd time)
Elisabethville	1933	1941	Amour Maron (1891–1948)	Commissioner
Elisabethville	1941	1945	Amour Maron	Governor
Elisabethville	1945	March 1948	Léon Keyser	Governor
Katanga	March 1948	April 1951	Joseph Ziegler de Ziegleck auf Rheingrub	Governor
Katanga	May 1951	October 1955	René Wauthion	Governor
Katanga	January 1956	September 1958	Jean Paelinck	Governor
Katanga	September 1958	30 June 1960	André Schöller (b. 1908)	Governor (also deputy governor-general)

== Governors of successor state and provinces (1960–1966) ==
=== Independent Katanga (1960–1963) ===
The rule of the independent state of Katanga were:

Start	End	Officeholder	Title
16 June 1960	12 January 1963	Moïse Tshombe	President

=== Nord-Katanga (1961–1966) ===
The governors (or equivalent) of the province of Nord-Katanga were:

Start	End	Officeholder	Title
20 October 1960	March 1961	Prosper Mwamba-Ilunga	President (1st time)
11 September 1962	27 September 1963	Prosper Mwamba-Ilunga	President (2nd time)
27 September 1963	15 March 1964	Jason Sendwe	President (1st time)
15 March 1964	21 April 1964	Fortunat Kabange Numbi (1934–1964)	President
21 April 1964	18 June 1964	Jason Sendwe	President (2nd time)
22 June 1964	July 1964	Ildephonse Masengo (c.1935–1969)	President
22 July 1965	5 November 1966	Henri Ndala Kambola	Governor (administrator since August 1964?)

=== Lualaba (1963–1966) ===
The governors (or equivalent) of the province of Lualaba were:

Start	End	Officeholder	Title
23 September 1963	24 April 1966	Dominique Diur	President (from 1965, governor)

=== Katanga Oriental (1963–1966) ===
The governors (or equivalent) of the province of Katanga Oriental were:

Start	End	Officeholder	Title
13 August 1963	20 July 1965	Édouard Bulundwe (b. 1932)	President
20 July 1965	24 April 1966	Godefroid Munongo	Governor (from 24 April 1966 to 5 November 1966 of Sud-Katanga, including Lualaba)

== Governors of Katanga / Shaba (1966–2015) ==
The governors (or equivalent) of the province of Katanga, renamed Shaba Province on 2 January 1972, then returned to the name of Katanga in 1997 were:

Province	Start	End	Officeholder	Title
Katanga	3 January 1967	August 1967	Jean Foster Manzikala	
Katanga	1967		Léopold Massiala	Governor
Katanga	1967	1968	Denis Paluku (1936–2014)	Governor
Katanga	1968	1970	Léon Engulu	Governor
Katanga	1970	1972	Henri-Désiré Takizala	Governor
Shaba	1972	1973	Daniel Monguya Mbenge	Commissioner
Shaba	1973	1975	Duga Kugbe Toro (1st time) (1935–2010)	Commissioner
Shaba	1975	1977	Assumani Busanya Lukili	Commissioner
Shaba	1977	1978	Efambe Ey'Olanga	Commissioner
Shaba	1978	January 1980	Mosambaye Singa Boyenge	Commissioner
Shaba	January 1980	January 1985	Mandungu Bula Nyati (1935–2000)	Governor
Shaba	January 1985	1986	Duga Kugbe Toro	Governor (2nd time)
Shaba	1986	May 1990	Louis Alphonse Koyagialo	Governor
Shaba	May 1990	November 1991	Bonaventure Konde Vila Kikanda	Governor
Shaba	1991	April 1995	Gabriel Kyungu wa Kumwanza	Governor (1st time)
Shaba	1995	1997	Benjamin Thadée Ngoie Mulume	Governor
Katanga	March 1997	April 1997	Gabriel Kyungu wa Kumwanza	Governor (2nd time)
Katanga	April 1997	April 1998	Gaëtan Kakudji	Governor
Katanga	April 1998	April 2001	Augustin Katumba Mwanke	Governor
Katanga	April 2001	November 2001	Jacques Muyumba	Governor (interim)
Katanga	26 November 2001	May 2004	Aimé Ngoy Mukena	Governor
Katanga	26 May 2004	24 February 2007	Kisula Ngoy	Governor
Katanga	24 February 2007	September 2015	Moïse Katumbi	Governor
Katanga	September 2015	29 October 2015	Guilbert Paul Yav Tshibal	Governor (interim)

== See also ==
- Lists of provincial governors of the Democratic Republic of the Congo
