= Serge Lagauche =

French politician (born 1940)

Serge Lagauche (born 2 January 1940) is a former member of the Senate of France, who represented the Val-de-Marne department from 1997 to 2011. He is a member of the Socialist Party.
