= Franck Mwe di Malila =

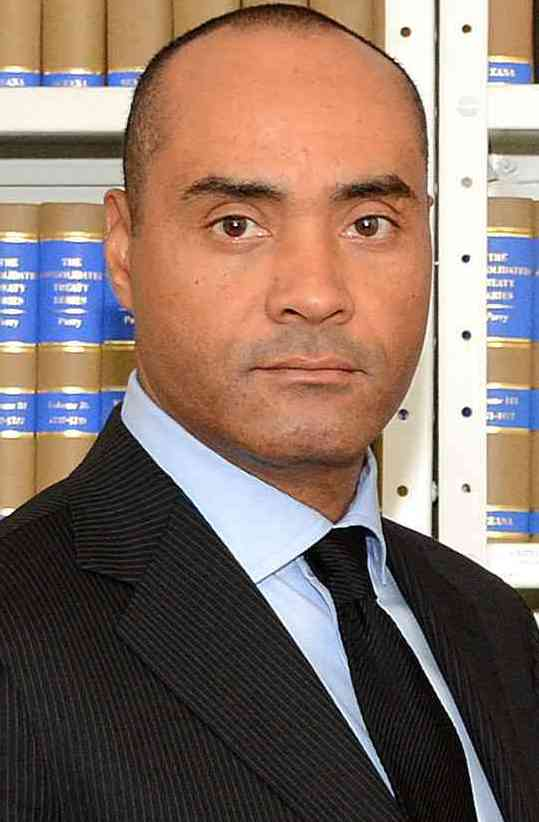

Vice Prime Minister - Deputy Minister for Foreign Affairs
- Incumbent
- Assumed office 30 April 2019
- President: Félix Tshisekedi
- Prime Minister: Bruno Tshibala

Deputy Minister of Planning
- In office 20 December 2016 – 9 April 2017
- President: Joseph Kabila
- Prime Minister: Samy Badibanga

Deputy Minister of International Relations and Regional Integration
- In office 8 December 2014 – 19 December 2016
- President: Joseph Kabila
- Prime Minister: Augustin Matata Ponyo

Minister of Tourism
- In office 10 April 2017 – 30 April 2019
- President: Joseph Kabila
- Prime Minister: Bruno Tshibala
- Preceded by: André Moke Sanza

Personal details
- Born: 22 January 1968 (age 58) Kinshasa, Democratic Republic of Congo
- Party: UFC
- Spouse: Marie-Claire Kengo
- Education: College Saint Vincent de Soignies, CERIA de Bruxelles

Franck Mwe di Malila (born 22 January 1968) was a Congolese politician and adviser to the former Senate president of the Democratic Republic of the Congo, Léon Kengo Wa Dondo. As of May 2019 he was serving as intérim vice-Prime Minister and deputy Minister for Foreign Affairs. He previously served as Deputy Minister of International Relations and National Integration as well as Deputy Minister of Planning and as Minister of Tourism.

== Family ==
He is a descendant of the (Mwe di) Malila family, among the most notable families in Kinshasa, Bas-Congo and Cabinda.

== Biography ==
=== Childhood ===
Malila grew up in Kinshasa, the capital of the Democratic Republic of the Congo and in Belgium. He was raised by his father, the Congolese businessman, estate owner, president of the Woyo Alliance and Football official of the L'AS Dragon, Edouard Lendje Héritier Mwe di Malila Apenela. He attended the primary school Lycée Français de Kinshasa and then went to the Ecole des Carrières in Soignies (Belgium). Later he studied humanities at the College of Saint Vincent in Soignies. At the CERIA in Brussels he graduated with the diploma in business administration, organization and development.

=== Business career ===
From 1992 to 1994 Malila was responsible for the administration part at Exxon in Kinshasa as a manager. From 1994 to 1997 he was the managing director of Zaïre Technical Service.

== Political career ==
=== Adviser ===
Besides his business activities as a manager, he remained as a private advisor to the director of the President's cabinet of the Republic from 1993 to 1997. From 2007, he found himself in the wake of Senate President Leon Kengo. He is also married to Marie-Claire Kengo, Kengo's daughter. They have three children, who grew up in the Congo and Belgium. Through his marriage to Kengo's daughter, he developed an intensive political relationship with his father-in-law, leading to becoming his political adviser, a position he will hold until joining the government.

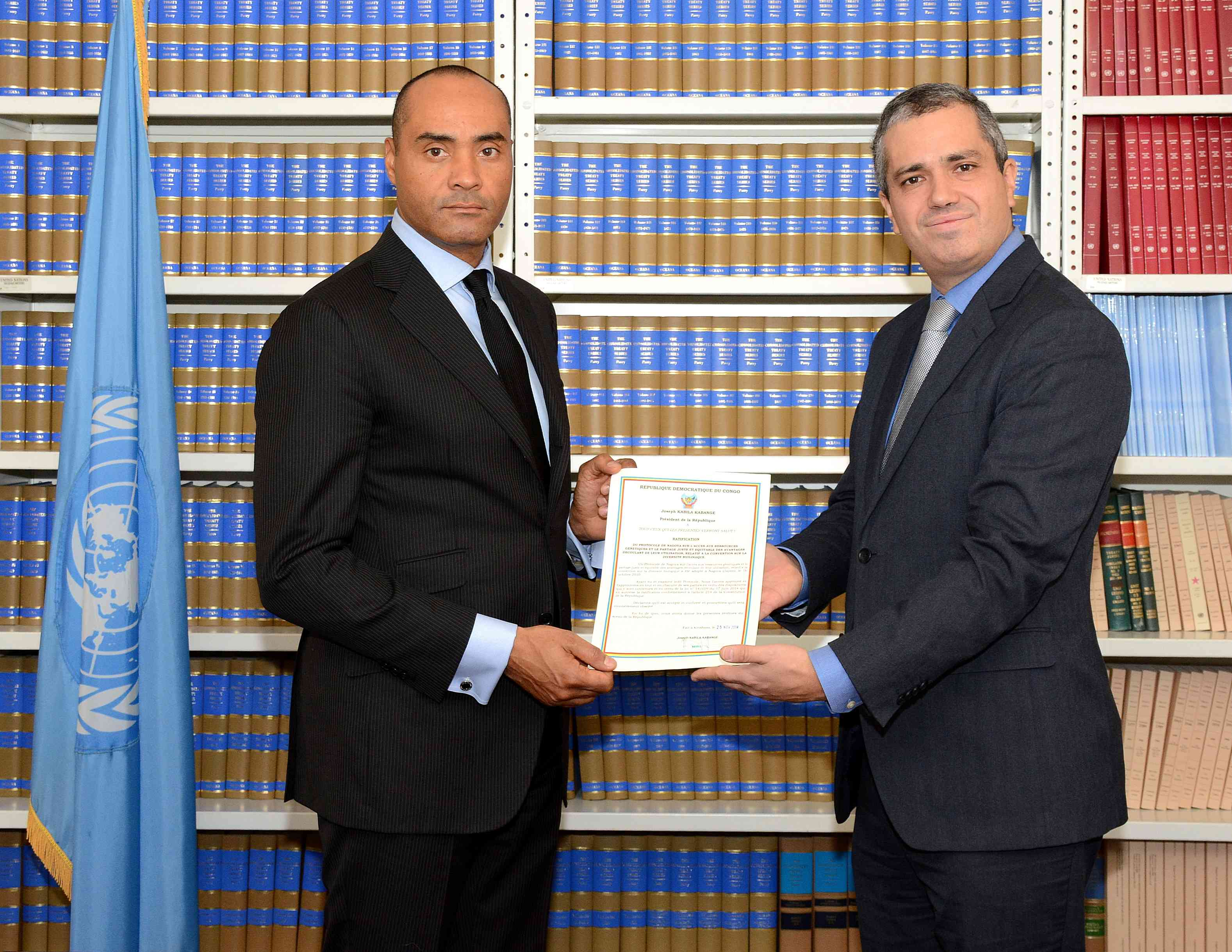
Malila at the United Nations.

=== Technical secretariat of the national consultations ===
On 8 August 2013, he was appointed a member of the technical secretariat by the Presidium of the national consultations, which is composed by the President of the Senate Leon Kengo wa Dondo and by the president of the national assembly Aubin Minaku. The technical secretariat is an organ of the national consultations, consisting of a coordinator and his deputy, along with a panel of 14 thematic advisors and 2 financial advisors. Announced by President Kabila in December 2012, the national consultations aim to "create national unity" to face the war in North Kivu. Last June, he signed an order creating these consultations whose management has been entrusted to the presidents of both chambers of parliament.

=== Deputy-minister of international relations and national integration ===
On 7 December he was nominated as the deputy minister of international relations and national integration by Congo's current president Joseph Kabila.

== Additional information ==
Malila, is currently in a major dispute with his family and his other, 15 siblings. The subject of the argument is the properties of his. On 7 June his deceased father, Edouard Mwe di Malila Apenela, left his numerous children a large estate empire after his death. At the public hearing on 4 February the Supreme Court of Kinshasa Gombe made a judgment, which only acknowledges four children of Edouard Mwe di Malila, as legitimate heirs of which one is Malila. The 15 other potential heirs appealed against the decision demanding to set the judgment aside. The quartet, to which Franck Malila belongs, is accused of defrauding the basis of the documents on which the Court based their judgment. At a council meeting on 7 August 19 children were identified as legitimate heirs and it was decided that the four eldest brothers were merely temporarily obliged as representatives of the remaining siblings. The committee decided that they had six months to create an inventory. After this period, the quartet did not feel obliged to the agreements and decided on no compromising with the other siblings. One of the lawyers of the plaintiffs wrote a complaint with the argument that the judgment made on 4 February did not obtain this unanimous agreement.
