= Vital Kamerhe =

Congolese politician (born 1959)

His Excellency Vital Kamerhe
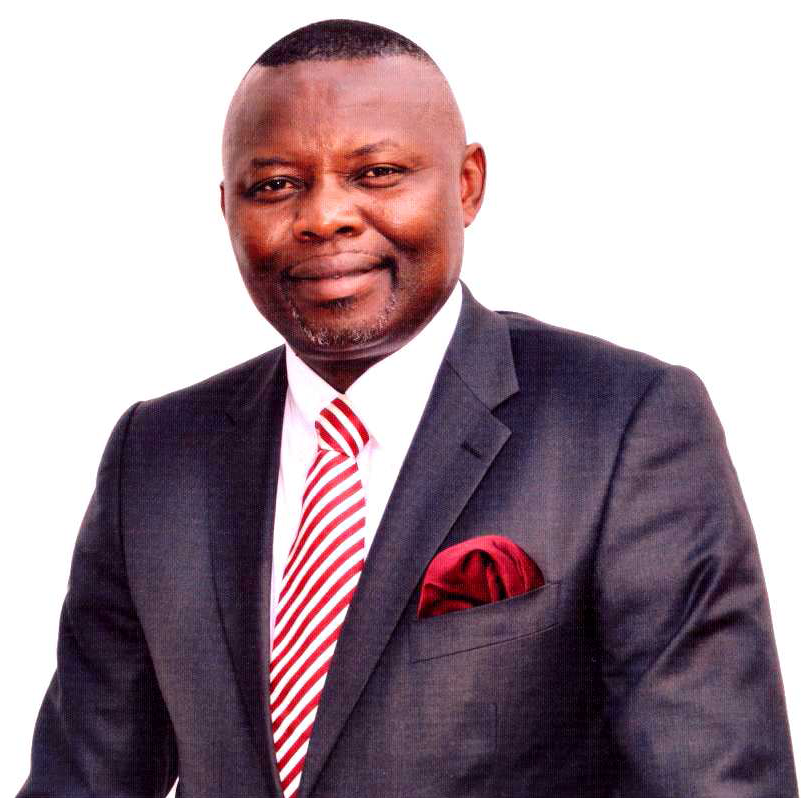
- Kamerhe in 2010

President of the National Assembly of the Democratic Republic of the Congo
- In office May 24, 2024 – September 25, 2025
- Preceded by: Christophe Mboso
- Succeeded by: Aimé Boji
- In office December 29, 2006 – March 26, 2009
- Preceded by: Thomas Luhaka
- Succeeded by: Evariste Boshab

Member of the National Assembly from Bukavu
- Incumbent
- Assumed office February 12, 2024
- In office December 29, 2006 – March 26, 2009

Vice Prime Minister, Minister of Economy
- In office March 23, 2023 – February 2024

Personal details
- Born: 4 March 1959 (age 67) Bukavu, Belgian Congo
- Party: Union for the Congolese Nation
- Spouse: Amida Shatur
- Website: http://www.vital-kamerhe.com/

Vital Kamerhe Lwa Kanyiginyi Nkingi (born 4 March 1959) is a Congolese economist and politician, currently serving as Deputy Prime Minister of Economy and the leader of the Union for the Congolese Nation (UNC) party. He served as the President of the National Assembly of the Democratic Republic of the Congo from 2006 to 2009. After resigning from that office, he went into the opposition and founded the UNC. He ran in the 2011 presidential election. He supported Félix Tshisekedi as a coalition partner in the 2018 presidential election, and became chief of staff when Tshisekedi took office.

In 2020, Kamerhe was charged with and convicted of the embezzlement of US$50 million. The Congo Research Group described his arrest as unprecedented in recent DRC history. Kamerhe was temporarily replaced as chief of staff when his trial began, and permanently replaced half a year after he was convicted. Kamerhe appealed his conviction, and a second appeal led to his acquittal in 2022. In 2023, he rejoined the government as Félix Tshisekedi's deputy prime minister in charge of the economy.

== Biography ==
=== Early life and education ===
Born in Bukavu, Sud-Kivu, on March 4, 1959, Vital Kamerhe Lwa Kanyiginyi Nkingi is the son of Constantin Kamerhe Kanyiginyi and Alphonsine Mwa Nkingi. Originally from the Shi ethnic group of the Walungu Territory, he is married and father of 9 children.

He began his primary school in Bukavu and then in Goma. He then continued in the Kasai-Oriental, in Gandajika, where he finishes his primary school. School years 1975-1976 and 1976–1977, he attended the Institut Sadisana (former College St. Francois-Xavier) in Kikwit Sacré-Coeur, Bandundu province. He then moved to Kananga (Kasai-Occidental Province) and finally, after one year, to Mbuji-Mayi where he obtained his State degree in 1980 (Institut Mulemba). This experience led him to learn all four national languages of Congo namely Kikongo, Lingala, Kiswahili and Tshiluba. He also speaks fluent French.

From there he completed his studies at the University of Kinshasa, where he received his degree in Economics in 1987 with distinction. There he stayed as teaching assistant.

== Political career ==
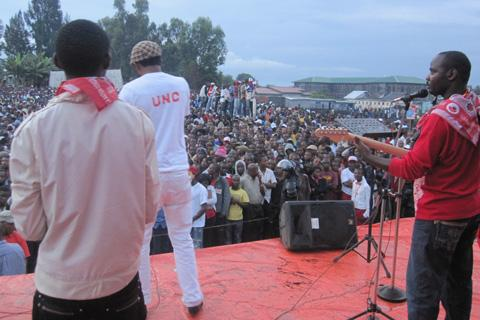
Concert/rally for the UNC candidate in 2011.

=== Under Mobutu ===
Kamerhe started his political career in 1984 with the Union for Democracy and Social Progress (UDPS). During the democratic transition under Mobutu Sese Seko, he was a member of the Rassemblement des forces Sociales et Federalistes (RSF) of fr:Vincent de Paul Lunda Bululu, and he was president of the youth wing of the Sacred Union of the Radical Opposition and Allies (French: Jeunesse de l'Union Sacrée de l'opposition Radicale et Alliés; JUSORAL). Between 1993 and 1995, he worked in several public functions.

- 1993: Director of the Cabinet of the Ministry of the Environment, Tourism and Directeur de Cabinet au Ministère de l’Environnement, Tourisme et Conservation de la Nature
- 1994: Coordinator of the Prime Minister's Cabinet
- 1994–1995: Director of the Cabinet for the Minister of Higher Education and University, fr:Mushobekwa Kalimba wa Katana; member of Lunda Bululu's RSF

=== Under Laurent Kabila ===
Under Laurent Kabila, Kamerhe became the deputy chief of staff of Etienne-Richard Mbaya, the minister of reconstruction. He then held the following positions.

- 1997–1998: Director of the Service National (a quasi-military service set up by Laurent Kabila)
- 1998: Finance Counselor at the Ministère de la Défense Nationale et Anciens Combattants, with the general Denis Kalume
- From 2000: Deputy commissioner-general at the General Commission for MONUC affairs.

==== Role in the peace process of the Great Lakes region ====
A founding member of the PPRD party in 2002, Vital Kamerhe was one of the leading figures in the peace process in the Democratic Republic of Congo, he was even nicknamed "the Peacemaker" (French: "le Pacificateur"). As Commissioner General of the Government responsible for monitoring the peace process in the Great Lakes region he was one of the principal negotiators of the 2002 peace deal.

==== Role in the 2006 election campaign ====
On 1 July 2004, he began leading the PPRD and directing Joseph Kabila's 2006 campaign for president. He was elected as parliamentarian in Bukavu with one of the highest scores in the country. He was elected deputy for South Kivu in the National Assembly in 2006, and he served as president of the National Assembly until 26 March 2009.

=== As President of the National Assembly ===
In 2009, as President of the National Assembly, he questioned Kabila and his own party over the Umoja Wetu operations that allowed several thousand Rwandan troops to deploy into the Congo without informing the parliament. On January 21, 2009, he released a statement to Radio Okapi expressing his disappointment for the joint military operations between the Congolese and Rwandan army in the Kivu, conducted without informing the National Assembly and the Senate and thus violating the article 213 of the constitution.

On March 25, 2009, he delivered a speech resigning as President of the National Assembly. On 14 December 2010, Kamerhe officially quit the PPRD, announcing his candidacy for the 2011 presidential election and the creation of his new party, the UNC. The UNC had its official inauguration in February 2011, and Kamerhe got 7.74% of the vote in the 2011 presidential election under its name.

On April 23, 2024, Vital Kamerhe was chosen as the “Sacred Union” candidate for president of the Assembly. On May 22, Vital Kamerhe was elected president of the National Assembly.

=== Under Félix Tshisekedi ===
==== Role in the 2018 election campaign ====
In the 2018 presidential election, Kamerhe supported the candidacy of UDPS leader Félix Tshisekedi. The UDPS allied with the UNC to form the Heading for Change coalition, and Tshisekedi agreed that if he won, he would make Kamerhe his prime minister. After the elections, Tshisekedi did become president, but the composition of parliament made it politically infeasible for him to name Kamerhe as prime minister. He instead made Kamerhe his chief of staff—one of the first senior positions he filled upon taking office.

==== Corruption trial ====
On 8 April 2020, Kamerhe was arrested and detained in Makala Central Prison, facing charges of having embezzled up to $57 million from an infrastructure project. Commenting on his arrest, the Congo Research Group wrote: "Never in Congo's political history over the past two decades has such an important player on the political scene been put behind bars." On 20 June 2020, Kamerhe was found guilty of aggravated corruption, money laundering, and embezzling $48 million. He was sentenced to twenty years of forced labour and ten years of ineligibility to vote or hold public office. One of his co-defendants, the Lebanese businessman Samih Jammal, was sentenced to twenty years of forced labour, to be followed by expulsion from the DRC. Another co-defendant, Jeannot Muhima Ndoole, was sentenced to two years of forced labour. The court also ordered the confiscation from the defendants' relatives of goods that it found to be proceeds of the defendants' crimes, noting that "the things produced by the offense can always be confiscated, regardless of the owner."

Kamerhe appealed his conviction. Aimé Boji, the secretary general of the UNC and Kamerhe's brother-in-law, expressed confidence that Kamerhe's prosecution had been politically motivated. On 18 June 2021, in its first appeal decision, the Kinshasa/Gombe Court of Appeals upheld Kamerhe, Jammal, and Ndoole's convictions but reduced their sentences. Kamerhe was conditionally released from prison in December 2021, on the grounds that his health had deteriorated and he needed medical care outside of prison while awaiting a second appeal. On 23 June 2022, in its second appeal decision, the Kinshasa/Gombe Court of Appeals acquitted Kamerhe and Jammal, saying there had not been enough evidence for a prosecution. In its 2022 country report on the DRC, the U.S. Bureau of Democracy, Human Rights, and Labor took Kamerhe's acquittal as evidence that "officials frequently engaged in corrupt practices with impunity," presenting it as an example of how "[l]ack of enforcement of court decisions in corruption cases contributed to impunity, as rulings were often overturned in appellate proceedings or dismissed due to procedural errors."

==== Return to government ====
On 25 March 2023, Félix Tshisekedi reappointed Kamerhe to his government, this time as vice prime minister in charge of the economy. On 22 May 2024, he was again elected as Speaker of the National Assembly and assumed office on May 24. He resigned as speaker on 22 September 2025 on the eve of a vote to remove him.

== Family ==
Kamerhe is the brother-in-law of Aimé Boji. He married Amida Shatur on February 19, 2019.
