= Christophe Mboso =

Congolese politician

Second Vice-President of the National Assembly of the Democratic Republic of the Congo
- Incumbent
- Assumed office 24 May 2024

9th President of the National Assembly
- In office 3 February 2021 – 24 May 2024
- Preceded by: Jeannine Mabunda
- Succeeded by: Vital Kamerhe

Personal details
- Born: 7 August 1942 (age 84) Kasongo-Dinga, Belgian Congo (now Democratic Republic of the Congo)
- Occupation: Politician

Christophe Mboso N'Kodia Pwanga (born 7 August 1942) is a Congolese politician who was the President of the National Assembly from February 2021 to May 2024 and is currently the second vice-president. He leads the political grouping Action of Allies of the Convention for the Republic and Democracy (Alliance des alliés de la convention pour la République et la démocratie, AACRD).

== Career ==
Born in 1942, he graduated in 1972 with a bachelor's degree in political and administrative sciences from the University of Lubumbashi. In February 2021, he was elected as the President of the National Assembly following an election in which he received 389 votes out of 460. He succeeded Jeannine Mabunda who was dismissed on 10 December 2020.

== See also ==
- Évariste Boshab
- Jeannine Mabunda
- Gabriel Kyungu wa Kumwanza
