= Catherine Procaccia =

French politician

Member of the French Senate for Val-de-Marne
- Incumbent
- Assumed office 1 October 2004

Personal details
- Born: 13 October 1949 (age 76) Paris, France
- Party: The Republicans
- Education: Sciences Po

Catherine Procaccia (born 13 October 1949) is a member of the Senate of France, representing the Val-de-Marne department. She is a member of the Union for a Popular Movement.
