= Joseph Midiburo =

DR Congolese politician (1930–2008)

President of the Chamber of Deputies of the Democratic Republic of the Congo
- In office 3 March 1963 – September 1965
- Preceded by: Bertin Mwamba
- Succeeded by: Yvon Kimpiobi

Personal details
- Born: 1930 Bwisha, Rutshuru Territory, Belgian Congo
- Died: 13 June 2008 (aged 77–78) Kinshasa, Democratic Republic of the Congo
- Party: Rassemblement de l'Est du Congo; Centre du Regroupement Africain

Joseph Midiburo (1930 – 13 June 2008) was a Congolese politician who served as the third President of the Chamber of Deputies of the Democratic Republic of the Congo.

== Early life ==
Joseph Midiburo was born in 1930 in Bwisha, Rutshuru Territory, Belgian Congo. He could speak Kinyarwanda. He underwent four years of secondary education and took correspondence courses on accounting.

Midiburo founded the Rassemblement de l'Est du Congo (RECO/REKO) party, which later merged with the Centre du Regroupement Africain (CEREA). He subsequently became a vice president of the party. He served on the Executive College of the Goma territory.

== Career ==
Midiburo was elected to the first Congolese Chamber of Deputies in May 1960 on a CEREA ticket from the North Kivu constituency. On 21 June, he was elected 74 votes to 55 to become the Second Vice-President of the Chamber of Deputies.

In October he was made a member of a commission assembled by deposed Prime Minister Patrice Lumumba tasked with managing his relations with the United Nations Operation in the Congo. He briefly served in the Stanleyville government from late 1960 until he returned to the capital, Léopoldville, in mid-1961.

Midiburo was elected First Vice-President of the Chamber on 24 July 1961. In October 1962 he was arrested by Cyrille Adoula's government on charges of subversion, but he was released several weeks later. He was elected President of the Chamber on 3 March 1963.

In April 1963, Parliament resolved to create a joint committee to prepare revisions for the constitution. Though the presiding officers of both houses nominally chaired the committee together, Midiburo was left responsible for leading the panel. He served as President of the Chamber until September 1965. He took part in organising the Conference Nationale Souveraine of the early 1990s.

== Death ==
Midiburo died on 13 June 2008 while receiving medical care in Kinshasa in the presence of his son, Adolphe.
