= Jeannine Mabunda =

Congolese lawyer and politician

Jeanine Mabunda Lioko Mudiayi (born 10 April 1964) is a Congolese lawyer and politician who in 2019 became the first woman elected to lead the Democratic Republic of the Congo's National Assembly. She was impeached on 10 December 2020, through a democratic vote by the National Assembly with 281 votes.

== Early life and education ==
She was born on 10 April 1964 in Kinshasa and is from Équateur. She graduated from the Catholic University of Louvain in Belgium with a degree in law and from the ICHEC Brussels Management School in economics.

== Career ==
Mabunda was an executive of the Central Bank of Congo and was Director General of the Industry Promotion Fund for five years.

Mabunda was elected to the National Assembly in 2011 and re-elected in 2018 to represent Bumba in Mongala province. She belongs to the Common Forum for Congo (FCC) coalition. She has served as Minister of Industry and as an adviser to President Joseph Kabila in the fight against sexual violence and the recruitment of child soldiers. She is also a leader of the woman's league in the PPRD. In May 2017, she participated in a debate on "Women and Peace and Security" before the UN Security Council in New York.

On 24 April 2019, Mabunda was elected to lead the Congolese National Assembly, becoming the first woman to do so. She was the only candidate after her challenger Henry Thomas Lokondo was ruled ineligible. She was nominated by former President Kabila and supported by President Félix Tshisekedi. She received 373 of 385 votes after the main opposition party boycotted the vote in protest after the constitutional court rejected Martin Fayulu's challenge to the presidential election results. Mabunda promised to work with all members of the legislative chamber in the interest of citizens. In her first speech, she emphasised the urgency of appointing a Prime Minister.

== See also ==
- Christophe Mboso N'Kodia Pwanga
- Évariste Boshab
- Gabriel Kyungu wa Kumwanza
