= Gabriel Kyungu =

Congolese politician (1938–2021)

Gabriel Kyungu wa Kumwanza

President of the Provincial Assembly of Haut-Katanga
- In office 20 February 2021 – 21 August 2021
- Preceded by: Freddy Kashoba

Governor of Shaba
- In office 1991 – April 1995
- Preceded by: Bonaventure Konde Vila Kikanda
- Succeeded by: Benjamin Thadée Ngoie Mulume

Governor of Katanga
- In office March 1997 – April 1997
- Preceded by: Benjamin Thadée Ngoie Mulume
- Succeeded by: Gaëtan Kakudji

Personal details
- Born: Antoine Gabriel Kyungu Wa Kumwanza; 24 October 1938
- Died: 21 August 2021 (aged 82) Luanda, Angola
- Party: UNAFEC

Antoine Gabriel Kyungu wa Kumwanza (24 October 1938 – 21 August 2021) was a Congolese politician.

== Career ==
A member of UNAFEC, he served as President of the Provincial Assembly of Haut-Katanga from 20 February to 21 August 2021, President of the Council of Administration of the Société nationale des chemins de fer du Congo from 2019 to 2021, and twice served as Governor of Shaba/Katanga, from 1991 to 1995 and again in 1997.

== Death ==
He died of COVID-19 in Luanda on 21, August 2021, at the age of 82.

== Personal life ==
Kyungu was part of the Luba ethnic group.

== See also ==
- Christophe Mboso N'Kodia Pwanga
- Jeannine Mabunda
- Évariste Boshab
