= Thomas Luhaka =

Congolese politician

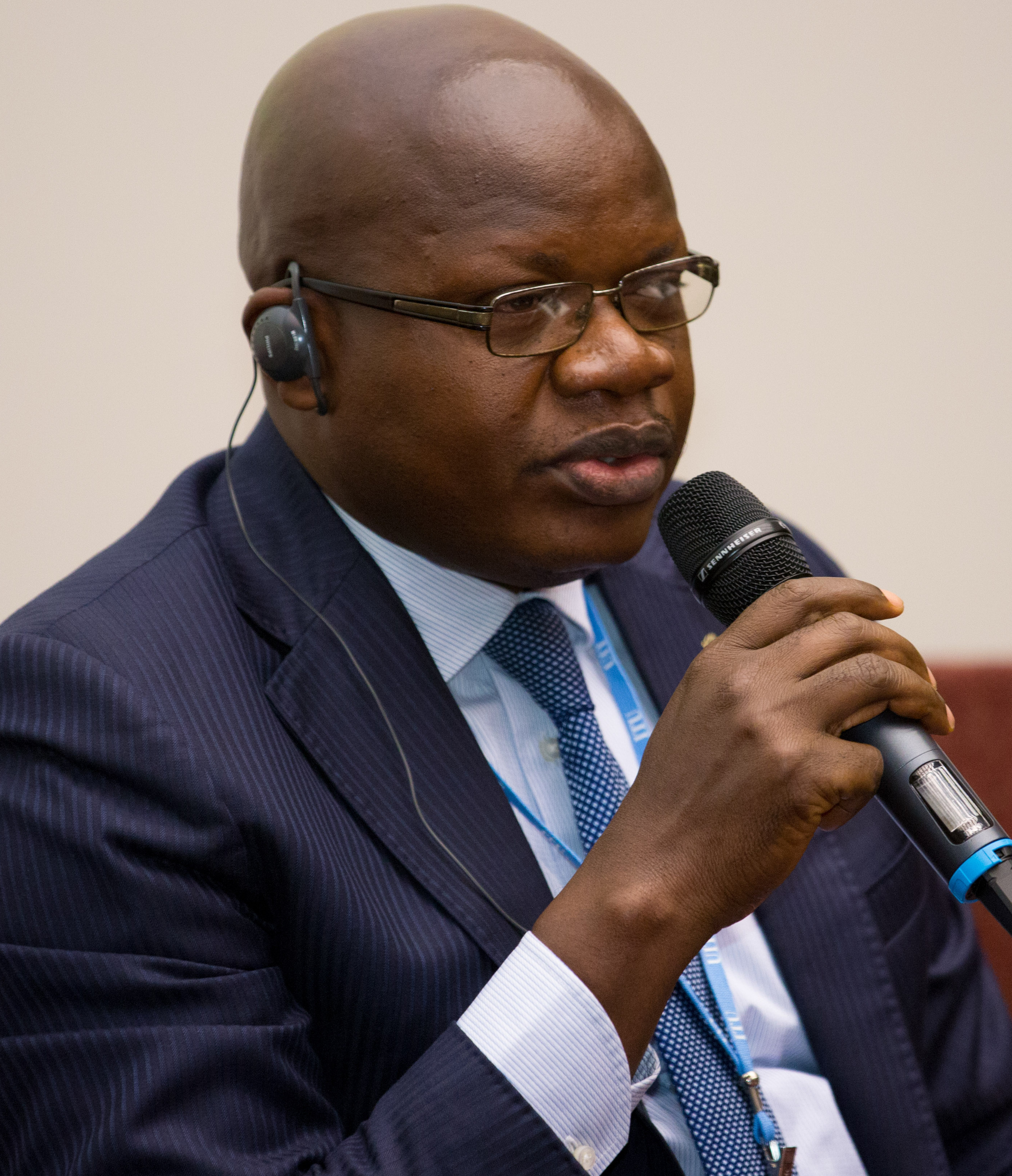
- Enabling Environment; Cybersecurity; Climate Change, 2014
- Born: Democratic Republic of the Congo
- Occupation: Politician

Thomas Luhaka is a Congolese politician. In 2019, he was appointed as the Minister of Higher and University Education of Democratic Republic of the Congo, under the Ilunga government that ran from September 2019 to April 2021, as well as a member of parliament. He is a member of Union for Democracy and Social Progress.
