= Évariste Boshab =

Congolese politician

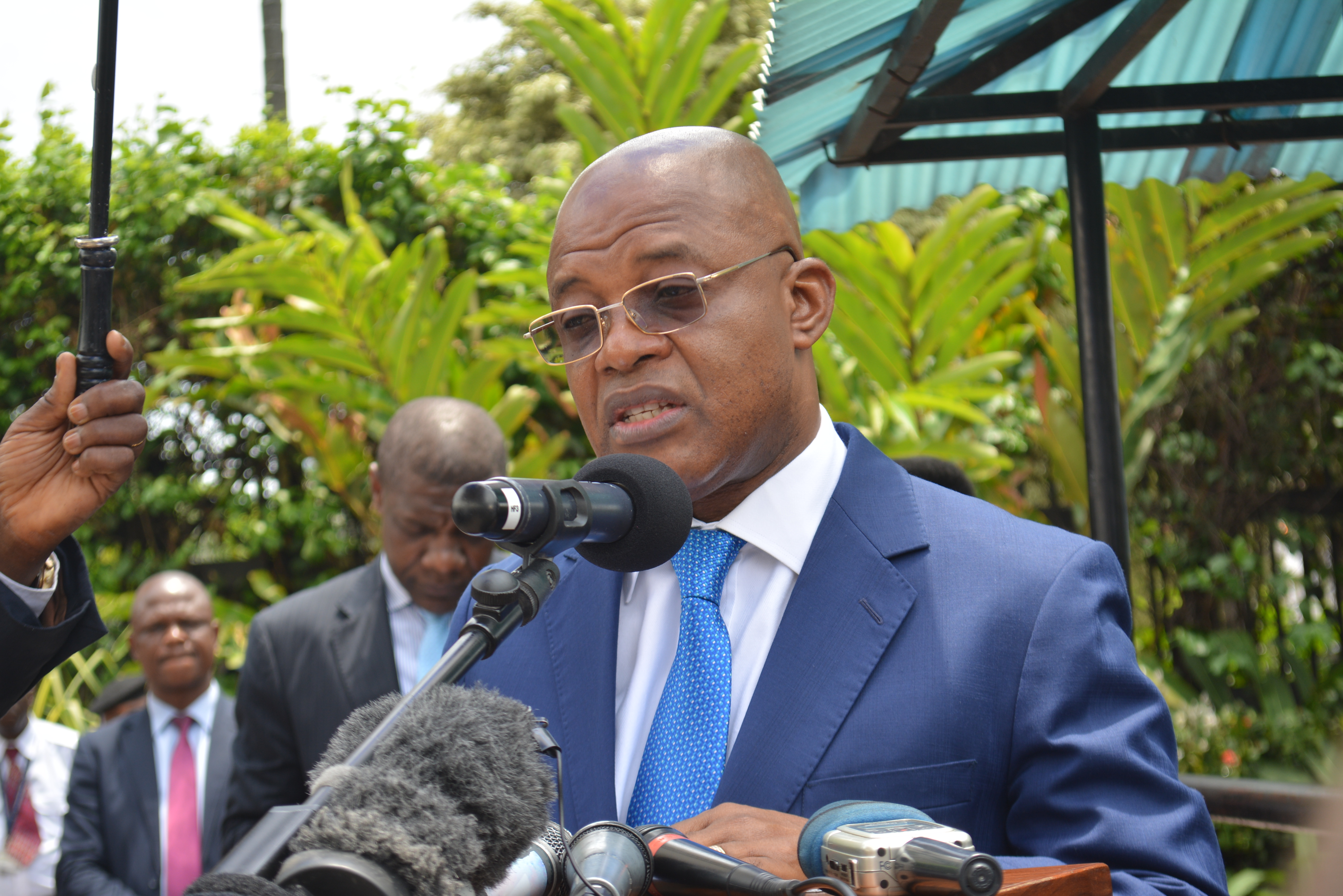
- Évariste Boshab

President of the National Assembly
- In office 2009–2012

Deputy Chief Of Staff to The Head Of State & Secretary
- In office 2001–2002

Deputy Prime Minister In Charge Of The Interior & Security
- In office Unknown–??

Personal details
- Born: 12 January 1956 (age 70) Mweka, Democratic Republic of the Congo

Évariste Boshab Mabudj-ma-Bilenge (born 12 January 1956) is a Congolese politician who is currently Deputy Prime Minister in Charge of the Interior and Security and a former President of the National Assembly.

== Early life ==
Boshab was born on 12 January 1956 in Teke-Kalmba (territory of Mweka), which was then part of the Belgian Congo. He is of Kuba origin, as he descended from the historical Kuba Kingdom. He obtained a degree as a Doctor of Law specializing in public law from the Catholic University of Louvain and later on also specialized in constitutional justice.

He first worked as a legal advisor to the National Union of Congolese Workers, and later on worked as a lawyer at the Court of Appeals of Kinshasa and as a Chief of Staff at the Court of Auditors. Afterward, he became a professor of public law at the University of Kinshasa briefly.

== Career ==
His first political role was Deputy Chief of Staff to the Head of State and Secretary from 2001 to 2002. He was President of the National Assembly from 2009 to 2012.

== Personal Sanctions ==
On May 29, 2017, Boshab was sanctioned by the EU, making him subject to a travel ban and assets freeze in all EU jurisdictions due his involvement in the commission and supervision of serious human rights violations and abuses during the September–December protests in Kinshasa. It was stated that in his capacity as Vice Prime Minister and Minister of the Interior and Security at the time he was supremely responsible for the actions of police and security agents who committed various abuses and applied excessive force against demonstrators resulting in many being killed, injured or arbitrarily detained. He was also sanctioned by the United States in December 2016 for his responsibility in the same abuses against protestors.

== See also ==
- Christophe Mboso N'Kodia Pwanga
- Jeannine Mabunda
- Gabriel Kyungu wa Kumwanza
