= Odette Terrade =

French politician (born 1949)

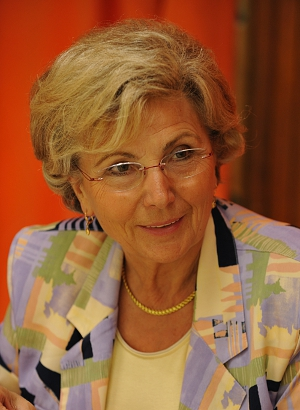
Odette Terrade in 2010

Odette Terrade (born 21 February 1949) is a former member of the Senate of France, who represented the Val-de-Marne department. She is a member of the Communist, Republican, and Citizen Group.

== Biography ==
Odette Terrade worked as an agent for the Cadastre of France from 1972 to 1982.

In March 1983, she was elected as a municipal councillor for Orly and served as deputy mayor from 1983 to 1989. She remained on the municipal council until 2014.

As the next candidate on the election list, Terrade became a Senator for Val-de-Marne on 13 June 1997. This followed the election of Senator Claude Billard as a deputy for the department, who chose to sit in the National Assembly rather than the Senate. She served at the Luxembourg Palace until the end of her term on 30 September 2004. She returned to the Senate on 19 September 2007, following the resignation of Hélène Luc, and served until 30 September 2011.

During her tenure, she served as vice-president of the Economic Affairs Committee, vice-president of the Delegation for Women's Rights and Equal Opportunities, and secretary of the Planning Delegation.

Terrade serves as the secretary of the Union Syndicale des Retraités (USR) within the CGT for Val-de-Marne.

== Bibliography ==
- Page on the Senate website (in French)
