= Union for the Congolese Nation =

Political party in the Democratic Republic of the Congo

Union for the Congolese Nation Union pour la nation congolaise
- Leader: Vital Kamerhe
- General Secretary: Odette Babandoa Etoa
- Ideology: Liberal democracy
- Political position: Centre-right
- Colours: White, Red
- Seats in the National Assembly: 14 / 500
- Seats in the Senate: 0 / 108

The Union for the Congolese Nation (French: Union pour la Nation Congolaise; UNC) is a political party in the Democratic Republic of the Congo. It was founded in 2010 by Vital Kamerhe, who was at the time a close ally of the former president Joseph Kabila. Kamerhe had previously served as the Chief of Staff to Kabila and as the Speaker of the National Assembly.

The UNC's political position is generally considered to be center-left. The party's platform emphasizes national unity, economic development, and social justice. It advocates for policies that promote private sector growth, job creation, and poverty reduction, as well as greater government transparency and accountability. The UNC has positioned itself as an opposition party in recent years, and has been critical of the current government led by President Félix Tshisekedi. However, the party has also expressed a willingness to work with the government on issues of national importance. It quickly gained popularity in the eastern part of the country, particularly in the North Kivu and South Kivu Provinces.

== History ==
=== Background to the political party ===
Vital Kamerhe had been a prominent figure in Congolese politics for several years, serving as the Chief of Staff to Joseph Kabila from 2003 to 2008 and later as the president of the National Assembly from 2006 to 2009. He was a member of Kabila's ruling party, the People's Party for Reconstruction and Democracy (PPRD), during this time. In the 2006 presidential elections, Kamerhe played a key role in organizing rallies and mobilizing support for Kabila. He was also responsible for negotiating alliances with other political parties and ensuring that the campaign message was communicated effectively to voters. The election was marked by allegations of fraud and irregularities, with some opposition candidates and international observers claiming that the results had been manipulated in Kabila's favor. Kabila was declared the winner with over 58% of the vote, while the main opposition candidate, Jean-Pierre Bemba, received just over 42% of the vote. Following the election, Kamerhe was appointed as the president of the National Assembly, a position he held until 2009. He continued to be a close ally of Kabila and played an important role in shaping government policy during this time.

=== Defection from PPRD and formation of UNC ===
Kamerhe's departure from the ruling party was due to various reasons, including his opposition to Kabila's plan to amend the constitution for a third term as president. Kamerhe believed this move would be detrimental to the country's stability and democracy, leading to public criticism and conflict between himself and Kabila's supporters. Corruption within the ruling party was another major concern for Kamerhe, who called for greater transparency and accountability in government. This stance further strained his relationship with Kabila and his allies. Personal factors also contributed to the rift, with reports suggesting Kamerhe was frustrated by his lack of influence and Kabila's unwillingness to consider his advice. There were also rumors of a power struggle between Kamerhe and Kabila's inner circle, with some alleging that Kamerhe was positioning himself as Kabila's successor.

On March 25, 2010, Kamerhe founded the UNC to participate in the 2011 presidential elections, gaining support in the eastern part of the DRC, where he had a strong political following.

During the 2011 presidential elections, Kamerhe ran as an independent candidate under the UNC banner and was appointed as Étienne Tshisekedi's campaign director. The election was marred by allegations of voter fraud and irregularities, leading to protests and clashes between opposition supporters and security forces. Despite the outcome, Kamerhe remained a prominent opposition figure and continued to speak out against Kabila's government.

In the 2018 elections, Kamerhe's UNC finished third with just over 7% of the vote. The election was tainted with allegations of fraud, with many opposition candidates and observers questioning the results, including Emmanuel Ramazani Shadary and Martin Fayulu.
