= List of political parties in the Democratic Republic of the Congo =

This is a list of notable political parties and alliances in the Democratic Republic of the Congo, both past and present. The country has a multi-party political system: one in which the number of competing political parties is sufficiently large as to make it almost inevitable that, in order to participate in the exercise of power, any single party must be prepared to negotiate with one or more others with a view to forming electoral alliances and/or coalition agreements.

Many parties in the country are "drawer" or "briefcase" parties, those set up from scratch for electoral purposes, with little to no real presence on the ground. Many lack headquarters, a distinct visual identity, or even an active base of supporters. Since the replacement of the pure proportional representation with a 1% electoral threshold in 2017, these nominal parties have tended to merge into broader political alliances, often incorporating figures from major parties rather than establishing large, unified parties. The more parties an alliance has, the more lists it can field, increasing the likelihood of surpassing the threshold and securing seats. Some of these parties are only made up of immediate family members, represented in a single corner of a city or in a single province.

Some political coalitions, such as the Common Front for Congo, have previously flirted with the idea of transforming itself into a single majority party, with the Moïse Katumbi's political platform, Together for the Republic, merging six of its member political parties and groups into a single political party on 18 December 2019.

In 2014, there were 602 parties registered with the Ministry of Internal Affairs and 910 in 2023, an increase of 51%.

== History ==
=== Pre-Mobutu ===
Under the Belgian Congo, the formation of political organizations was banned. Instead, évolués formed "associations" based primarily on ethnic interest or alumni affiliations. In December 1957, the colonial administration instituted reforms that permitted municipal elections and the formation of political parties. Some Belgian parties attempted to establish branches in the colony, but these were largely ignored by the population in favour of Congolese-initiated groups.

As independence neared, political activity blossomed, leading to the establishment of over 200 political parties, though nationally based parties struggled to remain cohesive due to ethnic divisions and leadership conflicts, causing larger coalitions to fragment. By the 1960 elections, some 250 political parties competed for just 137 seats, dropping down to 233 parties contesting 167 seats in the 1965 elections.

=== Mobutu era ===
Following Mobutu's accession to power in the Second Mobutu coup d'état, he founded the Popular Movement of the Revolution (MPR) on 17 April, 1966, later declaring it the supreme organ of state and sole legal party on 23 December 1970, fusing with the government in 1972. Many early political leaders aligned themselves with the new regime, while those who opposed it faced exile or imprisonment.

Facing mounting pressure from both domestic and international actors to introduce democratic reforms, Mobutu announced an end to single-party rule in a speech on April 24, 1990, and resigned as head of the MPR. Various illegal parties, such as the Union for Democracy and Social Progress, declared their intention to register, while prominent politicians left the MPR to establish their own parties. However, on May 3, Mobutu attempted to limit the number of legal parties to just two additional groups, though his decree was widely ignored. After months of public demonstrations, he ultimately conceded on October 6, announcing that there would be no restrictions on political parties. This was formalized on November 25 with the passage of a decree allowing unrestricted party registration.

=== Post-Mobutu ===
After the Alliance of Democratic Forces for the Liberation of Congo-Zaire toppled the Mobutu regime in May 1997, all political party activity was immediately and indefinitely suspended. In late January 1999, President Laurent-Désiré Kabila lifted the ban on forming new political parties, though he did not address the status of pre-existing parties. The requirements for registering new parties were stringent, demanding organizational and financial prerequisites that posed significant obstacles to prospective parties, with additional restrictions including a ban on affiliations with international organizations. All barriers to party activity were lifted in May 2001, and by the end of that year, more than 150 political parties had reportedly been officially registered.

== Coalitions ==
=== Active ===
Name	Est.	Leading party	Position	Ideology	Leader	Senate	Assembly
Sacred Union of the Nation	2020	Union for Democracy and Social Progress/TSHISEKEDI	Centre; Factions: Left-wing right-wing	Anti-Kabila; Big tent Populism	Félix Tshisekedi	95 / 109	447 / 500
Together for the Republic	2022	Together for the Republic	Centre to centre-left	Liberalism	Moïse Katumbi	3 / 109	18 / 500
Lamuka	2018	Engagement for Citizenship and Development	Liberal	Social liberalism	Martin Fayulu	0 / 109	0 / 500
Common Front for Congo	2018	People's Party for Reconstruction and Democracy	Centre-left to left-wing	Social democracy	Joseph Kabila	1 / 109	0 / 500

=== Defunct ===
Name	Leading party	Position	Ideology	Leader	Founded	Dissolved
Alliance of the Presidential Majority	People's Party for Reconstruction and Democracy	Centre-left to left-wing	Pro-Joseph Kabila	Joseph Kabila	2006	2018
Front Démocratique Congolais			Big-tent; Anti-Moïse Tshombe	Victor Nendaka Bika	1965	1966
Convention Nationale Congolaise	CONAKAT	Right-wing	Federalism; Pro-Moïse Tshombe	Moïse Tshombe	1965	1966
Organisation de l'Entente Kasaienne			Kasaian interest		1965	?
Coordination du Kivu Central	Congolese Regrouping/CONACO			Edmond Rudahindwa	1965	?

== Active parties/political groups ==
=== Hold national office or elected to parliament ===
Name	Founded	National coalition	Position	Ideology	Leader	Senate	Assembly
Union for Democracy and Social Progress/TSHISEKEDI	1982	USN	Centre-left	Progressivism; Social democracy	Félix Tshisekedi	15 / 109	70 / 500
Alliance of Democratic Forces of Congo	2010	USN	Centre-left	Social democracy	Modeste Bahati Lukwebo	6 / 109	35 / 500
Allied Actions–Union for the Congolese Nation	2010	USN	Centre-left	Social democracy	Vital Kamerhe	2 / 109	34 / 500
Act and Build		USN				5 / 109	25 / 500
Action of Allies/All for the Development of the Congo		USN			Jean Claude Tshilumbayi	2 / 109	21 / 500
Alliance of Stakeholders for the People	2023	USN			Tony Kanku Shiku	2 / 109	22 / 500
Alliance bloc 50	2023	USN		Decentralization; Anti-separatism; Anti-corruption	Julien Paluku	1 / 109	20 / 500
Movement for the Liberation of the Congo	2003	USN	Right-wing to centre-right	Christian democracy Nationalism; Economic liberalism Léon Bourgeois's Solidarism; Humanism	Jean-Pierre Bemba	4 / 109	19 / 500
Together for the Republic	2019	—N/a		Liberalism	Moïse Katumbi	3 / 109	18 / 500
Alliance for the Advent of a Prosperous and Great Congo	2023	USN			Pius Muabilu	4 / 109	16 / 500
Alternative Action of Stakeholders for the Love of the Congo		USN				1 / 109	17 / 500
Alliance 2024		USN				4 / 109	15 / 500
For Us to Build the Congo		USN			Guy Loando	2 / 109	13 / 500
Action of Allies for the Convention		USN				2 / 109	10 / 500
Coalition of Democrats	2023	USN			Jean-Lucien Bussa	0 / 109	10 / 500
Action of Allies of the Convention for the Republic and Democracy		USN			Christophe Mboso	0 / 109	9 / 500
Alliance of Progressive Congolese and Allies		USN			Gentiny Ngobila Mbaka	1 / 109	9 / 500
Alliance for Democratic Alternance and Allies		USN				0 / 109	8 / 500
Action for National Unity		USN		Patriotism	Jean-Jacques Panga	0 / 109	8 / 500
Audible Actions for Good Governance		USN				0 / 109	8 / 500
Alliance for Values		USN				1 / 109	7 / 500
Alliance for the Triple A and Allies		USN			Clémence Sangana Bilonda	1 / 109	7 / 500
Action of Allies for the Rise of the Congo		USN				1 / 109	7 / 500
Alliance of Nationalists		USN				1 / 109	7 / 500
Action of Allies for the Convention-Unified Lumumbist Party	1964	USN	Left-wing	Lumumbism; Pan-Africanism; African socialism African nationalism Left-wing nationalism	Didier Mazenga	0 / 109	8 / 500
Alliance of Solidarity Movements for Change		USN				0 / 109	6 / 500
Alliance of Unified Tshisekedists and Allies		USN		Budgetary discipline	Paul Tshilumbu	1 / 109	6 / 500
Avançons-MS		—N/a				0 / 109	5 / 500
Another Vision of Congo and Allies	2023	USN		Liberalism; Anti-Corruption; Human rights	Didier Budimbu	2 / 109	5 / 500
Alliance and Action for the Rule of Law		USN				0 / 109	4 / 500
Political Forces Allied with UDPS		USN				2 / 109	4 / 500
Christian Alternative for the Congo		USN	Right-wing	Christian democracy	André Lite	1 / 109	4 / 500
Alliance 2025		USN				0 / 109	3 / 500
Alternative Vital Kamerhe 2018		USN				3 / 109	3 / 500
New Momentum		—N/a			Adolphe Muzito	0 / 109	3 / 500
Progressive Revolutionary Dynamic	2021	—N/a	Left-wing	Progressivism	Constant Mutamba	0 / 109	3 / 500
UDPS/KIBASSA-A	1982 (UDPS founding); 1996 (split)	USN	Centre-left	Progressivism; Social democracy	Augustin Kibassa	0 / 109	2 / 500
Alliance of Political Parties Allied to the Congo Liberation Movement		USN				0 / 109	3 / 500
Alliance for the Reform of the Republic		USN				0 / 109	2 / 500
Action for the Federative Cause		USN				1 / 109	2 / 500
Alliance for the Rise and Democracy of the Congo and Allies		USN				0 / 109	1 / 500
Alliance for Development Actions of the Congo and Allies		USN				0 / 109	1 / 500
Leadership and Governance for Development	2022	—N/a			Matata Ponyo Mapon	0 / 109	1 / 500
Action by Allies Acquiring Democracy		USN				1 / 109	1 / 500
People's Party for Reconstruction and Democracy	2002	FCC	Centre-left to left-wing	Social democracy	Joseph Kabila	1 / 109	0 / 500
Action for Rupture and Development		USN				1 / 109	0 / 500
Action for Reconstruction and Work		N/A			Michel kanyimbu	1 / 109	0 / 500
Current of Renovating Democrats		USN				1 / 109	0 / 500
Congo Federal Convention		USN				1 / 109	0 / 500
Lumbist Social Movement		USN				1 / 109	0 / 500

=== Extra-parliamentary parties/political groups ===
Party name	Party Leader
Alliance of the Democratic Forces of Congo (Alliance des Forces democratiques du Congo/AFDC)	Bahati Lukwebo
Alliance for Congo's Renewal (Alliance pour le Renouveau du Congo/ARC)	Olivier Kamitatu Etsu
Camp of the Fatherland (Camp de la Patrie)	Leader unknown
Christian Democracy (Démocratie Chrétienne/DC)	Eugène Diomi Ndongala
Christian Democrat Party (Parti Démocrate Chrétien)	Leader unknown
Christian Democrats Party (Parti des Démocrates Chrétiens/PDC)	José Endundo Bononge
Christian Republican Party (Parti Chrétien Républicain/PCR)	Gilbert Kiakwama Kiakiziki
Coalition of Congolese Democrats (Coalition des Démocrates Congolais)	Leader unknown
Congolese National Movement–Lumumba (Mouvement National Congolais–Lumumba/MNC–L)	François Lumumba
Congolese Rally for Democracy–Goma (Rassemblement Congolais pour la Démocratie/RCD–G)	Azarias Ruberwa
Congolese Rally for Democracy–Kisangani-Liberation Movement (Rassemblement Congolais pour la Démocratie–Kisangani–Mouvement de Libération/RCD–K–ML)	Antipas Mbusa Myanwisi
Congolese Solidarity for Democracy (Solidarité Congolaise pour la Démocratie/SCODE)	Jean Claude Muyambo
Convention of Christian Democrats (Convention des Démocrates Chrétiens)	Leader unknown
Democrats of the Democratic Republic of Congo (Le Démocrate, République Démocratique du Congo)	A. Mande Monga
Democratic Social Christian Party (Parti Démocrate Social Chrétien/PDSC)	André Bo-Boliko Lokonga
Federalist Christian Democracy – Convention of Federalists for Christian Democracy (Démocratie Chrétienne Fédéraliste – Convention des Fédéralistes pour la Démocratie Chrétienne/DCF–COFEDEC)	Venant Tshipasa (Pierre Pay Pay Presidential candidate)
Future of the Congo (Avenir du Congo/ACO)	Jean-Michel Sama Lukonde
Forces for Renewal (Forces du Renouveau)	Azarias Ruberwa
Liberal Christian Democrats Union (Union des Libéraux Démocrates Chrétiens/ULDC)	Raymond Tshibanda
Movement for the Liberation of Congo (Mouvement pour la Liberation du Congo/MLC)	Jean-Pierre Bemba Gombo
National Alliance Party for Unity (Parti de l'Alliance Nationale pour l'Unité/PANU)	André-Philippe Futa
National Democratic Action ( Action Démocratique Nationale / ADENA)	Clovis Kabongo Malemba
Organisation du bahku (NBO)	Leader unknown
Parti Travailliste Congolais (PTC)	Thomas Ilenda Touzayamoko
People's Salvation Front (Front Populaire du Salut/FPS)	Ahmed Padia Binkatabana
Popular Movement of the Revolution/Nzuzi Faction (Mouvement Populaire de la Revolution/Fait Privé/MPR-FP)	Simon Nsimba M'vuedi
Rally of Congolese Democrats and Nationalists (Rassemblement des Congolais Démocrates et Nationalistes)	Leader unknown
Social Movement for Renewal (Mouvement Social pour le Renouveau)	Pierre Lumbi
Union for the Nation (Union pour la Nation)	Leader unknown
Union for the Republic National Movement/UNIR NM (Union pour la République - Mouvement national/UNIR MN)	Boyenga Bofala
Union of Congolese nationalist Federalists/UNAFEC (Union Nationale des fédéralistes du Congo - UNAFEC)	
Union for Congo's Reconstruction (Union pour la Reconstruction du Congo/UREC)	Oscar Kashala
Union of Federalist Nationalists of Congo (Union des Nationalistes Fédéralistes du Congo)	Leader unknown
Union of Mobutist Democrats (Union des Démocrates Mobutistes)	Nzanga Mobutu
Voix Independante du Peuple (Voix Independante du Peuple/VIP)	Eddy Dishueme

== Defunct parties/political groups ==
- Alliance of Democratic Forces for the Liberation of Congo (Alliance des Forces Démocratiques pour la Liberation du Congo)
- ABAKO
- Association of Indigenous Personnel of the Colony (APIC)
- Center of African Grouping (CEREA)
- Movement for the National Congolese Progress (MPNC)
- African Solidarity Party (PSA)
- People's National Party (PNP)
- Union of Mongo (UNIMO)

== Works cited ==
- Young, Crawford (1965). Politics in the Congo: Decolonization and Independence. Princeton: Princeton University Press. OCLC 307971.
- Kisangani, Emizet Francois; Bobb, Scott F. (2009). Historical Dictionary of the Democratic Republic of the Congo. Scarecrow Press. p. 520–521. ISBN 9780810857612.
- Lansford, Tom (2021). Political Handbook of the World 2020-2021. CQ Press. p. 297. ISBN 9781544384719.

== See also ==
- Lists of political parties
