= Transitional Government of the Democratic Republic of the Congo =

Congolese government from 2003 to 2006

- Cabinet of Democratic Republic of the Congo

- Date formed: 30 June 2003
- Date dissolved: 5 February 2007

People and organisations
- Head of government: Joseph Kabila; Abdoulaye Yerodia Ndombasi; Azarias Ruberwa; Jean-Pierre Bemba; Arthur Z'ahidi Ngoma
- Status in legislature: Coalition

History
- Predecessor: Kabila
- Successor: Gizenga I

The Transitional Government of the Democratic Republic of Congo was tasked with moving from the state riven by the Second Congo War (1998–2003) to a government based upon a constitution agreed on by consensus. It was established by the Global and All-Inclusive (AGI) agreement signed in December 2002. Joseph Kabila was sworn in as transitional president on 7 April 2003; the cabinet took office on 30 June 2003, inaugurating the transitional government; and four vice presidents were sworn in on 17 July 2003. The Transitional Government remained in place until after the new constitution of the Democratic Republic of the Congo was promulgated in February 2006 and a general election was held in December 2006. The transition ended when the new cabinet was installed on 5 February 2007.

== Background ==
In January 2001, President Laurent Kabila was assassinated, and his son Joseph Kabila was named head of state. The younger Kabila restarted the negotiations that stalled after the 1999 Lusaka Peace Agreement. Peace talks took place between Congolese factions in Lusaka, Zambia, and in Pretoria and Sun City, South Africa.

In July 2002, the Pretoria Accord was signed on withdrawal of foreign forces. In October 2002, Joseph Kabila negotiated the withdrawal of Rwandan forces occupying eastern Congo. Two months later, the 'Global and All-Inclusive Agreement' was signed by all remaining warring parties to end the fighting and establish a government of national unity.

Prunier writes: For a few months after the signing of the Sun City Agreement, things had stagnated as the delegates to the Intra-Congolese Dialogue kept debating in Pretoria about how to turn the piece of paper they had signed into some kind of reality. On April 1, 2003, they finally adopted the draft constitution which had been presented to them on March 6, and they agreed upon the outline of a transitional government.

== History ==
On 7 April 2003, Joseph Kabila was sworn in as transitional president. And on the next day, the last of the four agreed vice-presidents was named, Azarias Ruberwa for the RCD-G. He joined Abdoulaye Yerodia Ndombasi for Kabila's government; Jean-Pierre Bemba for the MLC; and Arthur Z'ahidi Ngoma for the political opposition.

The first cabinet was announced on 1 July.

On 17 July 2003, the four vice-presidents of the DRC's two-year transitional government took the oath of office in Kinshasa, but a day later on 18 July, transitional government officials designated by the RCD-Goma and the MLC refused to take the oath of office because it included swearing allegiance to President Joseph Kabila.

Over the course of September, MONUC strengthened its presence in Ituri and launched the Bunia "weapon-free zone" mission to demilitarize the area; although it achieved partial results, violence continued to affect the region. On 11 June 2004, a renegade faction of the presidential guard led by Major Eric Lenge attempted a failed coup attempt against the transitional authorities.

By mid-2005, the government faced widespread protests across the DRC and within diaspora communities after the UDPS and other opposition groups denounced the automatic extension of the transition, accusing leaders of mismanagement and violating the Inter-Congolese Dialogue commitments. Demonstrations erupted in Kinshasa, Mbuji-Mayi, Goma, Kananga, Mwene-Ditu, and Tshikapa despite harsh repression that caused deaths and injuries. Abroad, Congolese protesters mobilized in Brussels, Paris, Pretoria, and London. In Belgium, police blocked several hundred marchers gathered outside the DRC embassy, dispersing them after they chanted anti-government slogans. In Paris, tensions rose as protesters confronted guests leaving an embassy reception. In Pretoria, Congolese marched peacefully against what they viewed as an illegitimate prolongation of the transition. In London, thousands rallied under the "Congolese Rights in the United Kingdom" platform, calling for the removal and delegitimization of the 1+4 transitional power-sharing government.

The transitional period came to end with the completion of the 2006 general election and the swearing in of Kabila as president on 6 December 2006, the start of the newly elected parliament in January 2007, and the new cabinet taking office on 5 February 2007.

== Composition ==
Ministers:

- Foreign Affairs and International Cooperation:
  - Antoine Ghonda Mangalibi (MLC)
  - Raymond Ramazani Baya (MLC) (from 22 July 2004)
- Land Affairs: Venant Tshipasa (DCF/COFEDEC)
- Social Affairs:
  - Ingele Ifoto (Camp of the Fatherland)
  - Laurent-Charles Otete Omanga (from 3 January 2005)
- Agriculture, Fishing, Livestock Farming:
  - Justin Kangundu (MLC)
  - Constant Ndom Nda Ombel (MLC) (from 3 February 2004)
  - Paul Musafiri (MLC) (from 18 November 2005)
- Budget: François Muamba Tshishimbi (MLC)
- Foreign Trade:
  - Roger Lumbala (RCD-N)
  - Chantal Ngalula Mulumba (RCD-N) (from 3 January 2005)
- Women's Status and Family: Faida Mwangilwa (RCD)
- International Cooperation :
  - Banza Mulukayi (from 28 November 2005)
- Regional Cooperation: Antipas Mbusa Nyamwisi (RCD/ML)
- Culture and Arts:
  - Pierrette Gene Vungbo Yatalo (PPRD) (from 9 September 2003)
  - Christophe Muzungu (PPRD) (from 11 July 2004 )
  - Philémon Mukendi (PPRD) (from 18 November 2005)
- National Defense, Veterans, and Demobilization:
  - Jean-Pierre Ondekane (RCD) (30 June 2003 – 3 January 2005)
  - Adolphe Onusumba Yemba (RCD) (3 January 2005)
- Rural Development: Pardonne Kaliba Mulanga (Maï-Maï)
- Human Rights: Marie-Madeleine Kalala
- Economy:
  - Célestin Mvunabali (RCD) (30 June 2003 – 11 July 2004)
  - Émile Ngoy Kasongo (RCD) (from 11 July 2004)
  - Floribert Bokanga (RCD) (from 3 January 2005)
  - Pierre Manoka (RCD) (from 18 November 2005)
  - Moïse Nyarugabo Muhizi Mugeyo (RCD Goma) (from October 2006)
- Energy:
  - Kalema Lusona (PPRD)
  - Pierre Muzumba Mwana Ombe (PPRD) (from 3 January 2005)
  - Salomon Banamuhere (PPRD) (from 18 November 2005)
- Primary and Secondary Education:
  - Élysée Munembwe (MLC)
  - Constant Ndom Nda Ombel (MLC) (from 3 February 2004)
  - Paul Musafiri (MLC) (from 17 February 2005)
- Higher and University Education:
  - Émile Ngoy Kasongo (RCD) (from 30 June 2003 – 11 July 2004)
  - Joseph Mudumbi (RCD) (from 11 July 2004)
  - Théo Baruti (RCD) (from 18 November 2005)
- Environment and Nature Conservation: Anselme Enerunga (Maï-Maï)
- Finance:
  - Modeste Mutombo Kyamakosa (PPRD)
  - André-Philippe Futa Mudiumbula (PANU) (from September 2003)
  - Marco Banguli (PPRD) (from 18 November 2005)
- Civil Service:
  - Gustave Tabezi (30 June 2003 – 11 July 2004)
  - Athanase Matenda Kyelu (11 July 2004)
- Industry:
  - André-Philippe Futa Mudiumbula (PANU) (30 June 2003 – 18 November 2005)
  - Jean Mbuyu Lunyongola (PPRD)
- Information, Press, and National Communications:
  - Vital Kamerhe (PPRD) (30 June 2003 – 11 July 2004)
  - Henri Mova Sakanyi (PPRD) (from 11 July 2004)
- Interior, Decentralization, and Security:
  - Théophile Mbemba Fundu (PPRD)
  - Général Denis Kalume Numbi (from 10 October 2006)
- Youth and Sports:
  - Omer Egwake (MLC)
  - Roger Nimy (MLC) (from 17 February 2005)
  - Jacques Lungwana (MLC) (from 18 November 2005)
- Justice and Keeper of the Seals: Honorius Kisimba Ngoy
- Mines:
  - Eugène Diomi Ndongala (DC)
  - Ingele Ifoto (Camp of the Fatherland) (from 3 January 2005)
- Plan:
  - Alexis Thambwe Mwamba (MLC) (30 June 2003 – 24 March 2006)
  - Delly Sesanga (MLC) (from 24 March 2006)
- Treasury:
  - Joseph Mudumbi (RCD)
  - Célestin Mvunabali (RCD) (from 11 July 2004)
- Posts and Telecommunications: Gertrude Kitembo (RCD)
- Scientific Research: Gérard Kamanda wa Kamanda (FCN)
- Public Health:
  - Jean Yagi Sitolo (PPRD) (30 June 2003 – 11 July 2004)
  - Anastasie Moleko Moliwa (PPRD) (from 11 July 2004)
  - Émile Bongeli Yeikeo Ya Ato (PPRD) (from 3 January 2005)
  - Zacharie Kashongwe (PPRD) (from 10 October 2006)
- Solidarity and Humanitarian Affairs: Catherine Nzuzi wa Mbombo (MPR/FP)
- Tourism:
  - Roger Nimy (MLC)
  - José Engwanda (RCD-N) (from 3 February 2004)
- Transportation and Communications:
  - Joseph Olenghankoy (FONUS)
  - Heva Muakasa (FPN) (from 3 January 2005)
  - Modeste Yali (Maï-Maï)
- Work and Social Welfare:
  - Théo Baruti (RCD) (30 June 2003 – 11 July 2004)
  - Jean-Pierre Lola Kisanga (RCD) (from 11 July 2004)
  - Balamage Nkolo (RCD) (from 3 January 2005)
- Public Works and Infrastructure:
  - José Endundo Bononge (MLC)
  - José Makila (MLC) (from 17 February 2005)
- Urban Planning and Housing: John Tibassima Atenyi (RCD/ML)

== See also ==
- 2000s in the Democratic Republic of the Congo
- Transitional National Assembly of the Democratic Republic of the Congo
