= 2006 Democratic Republic of the Congo general election =

- Presidential election
- 30 July 2006 (first round); 29 October 2006 (second round)
- Turnout: 70.54% (first round); 65.36% (second round)
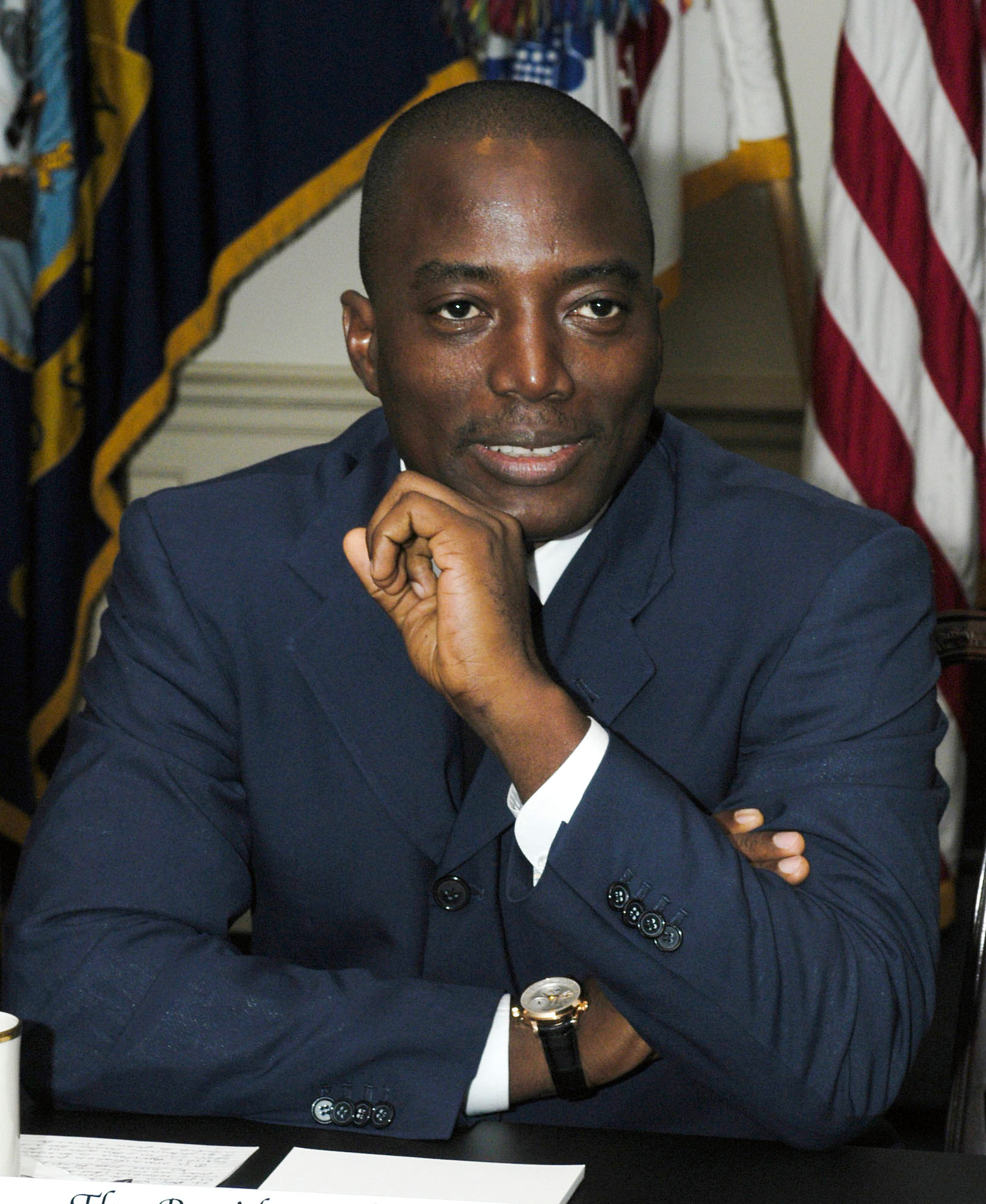

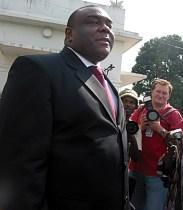
Nominee	Joseph Kabila	Jean-Pierre Bemba
Party	Independent (Note: Kabila was supported by the Alliance of the Presidential Majority, which notably included the People's Party for Reconstruction and Democracy.)	MLC
Popular vote	9,436,779	6,819,822
Percentage	58.05%	41.95%
President before election
Joseph Kabila
Independent
Elected President
Joseph Kabila
Independent
- Legislative election
- 30 July 2006
- 500 seats of the National Assembly; 251 seats needed for a majority
Composition of the National Assembly after the election
Prime Minister before	Prime Minister after
None (Note: The post of prime minister was vacant; there were four vice presidents in the transitional government from 2003 to 2006.)	Antoine Gizenga; PALU

General elections were held in the Democratic Republic of the Congo on 30 July 2006 for the President of the Republic and all 500 seats of the National Assembly, the lower house of the Parliament. They were the first relatively free multiparty elections since 1960, just before independence from Belgium, and the first since the overthrow of longtime leader Mobutu Sese Seko in 1997. Incumbent president Joseph Kabila, who led the transitional government formed after the Second Congo War in 2003, ran as an independent candidate and defeated Jean-Pierre Bemba of the Movement for the Liberation of the Congo (MLC). Kabila was inaugurated for his first term under the country's new constitution on 6 December 2006.

The polls were boycotted by the veteran opposition leader, Étienne Tshisekedi, and his party Union for Democracy and Social Progress (UPDS), who complained of fraud. The international community donated $460 million to fund the elections and deployed the world's largest UN peacekeeping operation, MONUC, to help the stability of the election. While the election was conducted relatively peacefully, the collection of the results proved chaotic, leading to armed clashes and growing fears of instability. As a result, DRC election officials announced that they would begin to release partial results earlier instead of only announcing the final count on 20 August.

On 20 August, the CEI released its full provisional presidential election results, indicating that neither candidate was able to secure a majority, which led to a run-off election on 29 October. On that day, voters went to the polls to vote in:

- a run-off election for the Presidency, as no candidate had obtained more than 50 percent of the first-round vote.
- an election of provincial parliaments

On 15 November, the CEI released its full provisional results for the presidential election's second round, indicating that Joseph Kabila had won with 58.05 percent. The results were, however, rejected by Bemba who claimed irregularities. On 27 November, the DRC Supreme Court confirmed that Kabila had won the election, and he was sworn in as president on 6 December.

The election results reflected the east–west divide in the DRC, with the first round seeing Kabila receiving at least 70 percent of the vote in the eastern provinces of Orientale, Katanga, South Kivu, North Kivu and Maniema. Bemba received more votes in the west, especially in Kinshasa, Bas-Congo, Kasaï-Occidental, and Équateur. The second round also saw a similar split and Bemba received nearly 100 percent of the vote in his home province of Équateur.

In the parliamentary elections Kabila's People's Party for Reconstruction and Democracy (PPRD) emerged as the largest party, winning 111 of the 500 seats, followed by Bemba's MLC with 64 seats. Kabila's coalition, the Alliance of the Presidential Majority (AMP), was later joined by several other parties, notably Antoine Gizenga's Unified Lumumbist Party and Nzanga Mobutu's Union of Mobutist Democrats, giving it a majority in the National Assembly.

== Registration and voter turnout ==
Over 25 million people registered to vote for the elections, in a country where the exact population is not known, but is likely in excess of 60 million. The Independent Electoral Commission (CEI or La Commission Electorale Indépendante) reported a voter turnout of 80 percent.

== Candidates ==
Thirty-three people registered as candidates for the Presidency and 9,000 for the 500 seats in the federal parliament.

The initial presidential favourites were Joseph Kabila, the incumbent, and Jean-Pierre Bemba, one of the four vice-presidents.

- Banyingela Kasonga (APE)
- Jean-Pierre Bemba Gombo (MLC) and Vice-president
- Jean Marinaque – independent
- Alou Bonioma Kalokola – independent
- Eugène Diomi Ndongala (DC)
- Antoine Gizenga (PALU)
- Bernard Emmanuel Kabatu Suila (USL)
- Joseph Kabila Kabenge – independent & incumbent
- Gérard Kamanda wa Kamanda (FCN)
- Oscar Kashala Lukumuenda (U. A)
- Norbert Likulia Bolongo – independent
- Roger Lumbala (RCDN)
- Guy-Patrice Lumumba – independent and son of former Prime Minister Patrice Lumumba
- Vincent de Paul Lunda-Bululu (RSF)
- Pierre Anatole Matusila Malungeni Ne Kongo – independent
- Christophe Mboso N'Kodia Pwanga (CRD)
- Antipas Mbusa Nyamuisi (Forces du Renouveau)
- Alafuele Mbuyi Kalala (RNS)
- Nzanga Mobutu (UDEMO) – son of former President Joseph Mobutu/Mobutu Sese Seko
- Florentin Mokonda Bonza (CDC)
- Timothée Moleka Nzulama (UPPA)
- Justine Mpoyo Kasa-Vubu (MD)
- Jonas Mukamba Kadiata Nzemba (ADECO)
- Paul Joseph Mukungubila Mutombo – independent
- Osée Muyima Ndjoko (R2D)
- Arthur Z'ahidi Ngoma (Camp de la Patrie) and Vice-president
- Jacob Niemba Souga (CPC)
- Marie-Thérèse Nlandu Mpolo Nene (CONGO-PAX)
- Wivine N'Landu Kavidi (UDR)
- Cathérine Marthe Nzuzi wa Mbombo (MPR/Fait privé)
- Joseph Olengankoy Mukundji (FONUS)
- Pierre Pay-Pay wa Syakasighe (DCF-COFEDEC)
- Azarias Ruberwa Manywa (RCD) and Vice-president
- Hassan Thassinda Uba Thassinda (CAD)

== Campaign ==
=== Joseph Kabila and Azarias Ruberwa ===
In the months leading up to the general election, political actors within the transitional government's presidential sphere became increasingly active, making their campaign strategies more visible. As voter identification and registration advanced, top officials relied on public appearances, provincial tours, and targeted political messaging to consolidate support. President Joseph Kabila placed himself at the center of these efforts by beginning with a high-profile voter registration in Kinshasa on 31 August 2005, an event that coincided with the registration of Vice Presidents Azarias Ruberwa and Jean-Pierre Bemba and effectively marked the unofficial start of campaigning, before traveling to Matadi in Bas-Congo, where Vice President Abdoulaye Yerodia Ndombasi had already mobilized local support and encouraged the "Ne Kongo" electorate to back the PPRD. The PPRD also intensified its presence through regional initiatives. Deputy Secretary-General Marie-Ange Lukiana Mufwankolo, accompanied by Kinshasa governor Jean Kimbunda, led a strong campaign in Kikwit alongside popular musician Werrason. As part of this outreach, Lukiana donated large quantities of fuel to Société Nationale d'Électricité (SNEL) for the reactivation of the town's thermal power plant, an act that generated significant goodwill among residents of a region where electricity was scarce. During his own field visits, Kabila drew large crowds at registration centers and along the streets of Matadi, publicly praising the conduct of voter enrollment and quietly assessing the political climate in Bas-Congo.

Ruberwa, head of the RCD, shaped his campaign around institutional rhetoric and symbolic actions, notably registering as a voter in Kinshasa, far from his native South Kivu and the party's traditional support base, and presenting this gesture as a call for citizens to move beyond ethnic or tribal loyalties and instead judge candidates by competence, patriotism, governance, and experience. The RCD itself had been born out of the early stages of the Second Congo War, triggered in July 1998 when President Laurent-Désiré Kabila, suspecting a coup plot, removed Rwandan General James Kabarebe from his command and expelled all RPA troops, provoking Rwanda and Uganda to mobilize support for a new rebellion. On 2 August 1998, mutinous Congolese soldiers, backed by the RPA, Uganda's UPDF, Burundi's FAB, and remnants of Mobutu's ex-FAZ, formed the Rassemblement Congolais pour la Démocratie (RCD) as a rebel group, with its military branch organized as the Armée Nationale Congolaise (ANC). By March 1999, rivalries between Rwanda and Uganda produced a schism that split the movement into a Kigali-aligned RCD-Goma and a Uganda-aligned RCD-ML, while the rebellion became notorious for massacres of civilians, attacks on refugee settlements, and acts of terror across the Kivus before formally transitioning into a political party in 2003.

During his campaign, Ruberwa used the party's seventh-anniversary celebrations, timed shortly after voter registration in Kinshasa, to portray the RCD as a defender of democratic norms during the transition, instructing party members to monitor electoral fairness and expressing readiness to engage with the UDPS, including support for restoring Étienne Tshisekedi's party to full legal recognition and its claim to the UDPS emblem. His attendance at the closing ceremony at Stade Cardinal Malula also broadened his urban appeal in Kinshasa.

=== Jean-Pierre Bemba ===
Although Jean-Pierre Bemba, like the other presidential figures, completed his voter registration in Kinshasa, the MLC leader often projected a deliberately ambivalent posture during moments of heightened political tension, most notably on 30 June 2005, when he spoke as though he were not part of the governing structure, openly questioning the government's official death toll from protest-related violence and demanding accountability.

Inside the MLC, electoral preparations took on a formal structure through an ideological seminar held from 1 to 5 August. Even though Bemba kept a low profile, his influence permeated the discussions, and at the meeting's close, Executive Secretary Thomas Luhaka set out the party's goals: winning at every electoral tier and promoting the rule of law and development, framed as the core principles that had justified the party's earlier armed struggle.

== Conduct ==
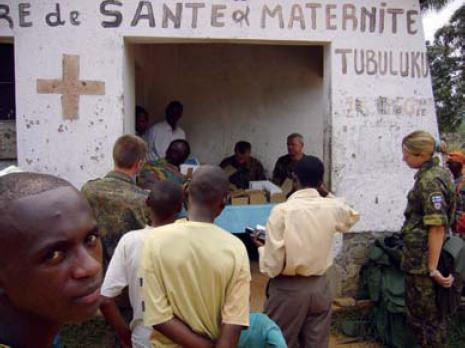
A polling place in Kasai-Occidental (central DRC)

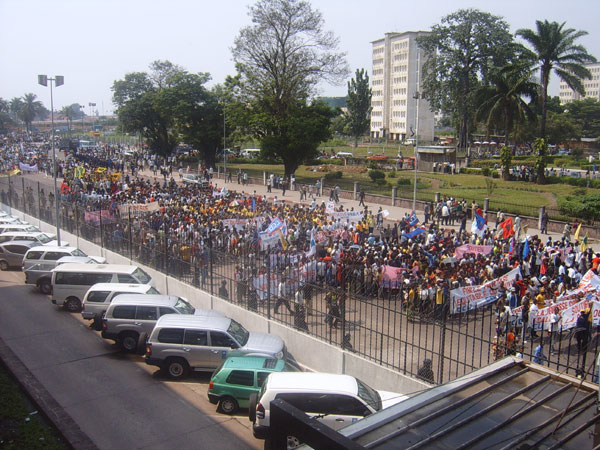
31 May 2006 demonstration in Kinshasa against the delay of Elections.

At least six people were killed in violent street protests in the run-up to the election.

As of 30 July, most polling stations were reported to have opened on time, with the election remaining peaceful. The election closely followed an agreement with Ituri militias on 28 July, an agreement which MONUC has stated "greatly enhances the security situation in the province in the lead-up to the historic DRC elections."

=== Violence in Kasai ===
Presumed supporters of Étienne Tshisekedi burned polling stations and voting materials in the city of Mbuji-Mayi, capital of East Kasai province, on Sunday to prevent the elections being held. The elections were extended until Monday and riot police were deployed. The Economist stated President Kabila was "making full use of his control of the security services and his monopoly of the state media" to secure the election. A report by Human Rights Watch detailed violence in the campaign. In one raid, "agents of the special police" stormed a Christian television station, arresting a pastor critical of the political process, beating technicians and destroying the broadcasting equipment. The government also imprisoned a journalist for "insulting the head of state." Shooting of protestors by soldiers was routine.

=== Fraud allegations ===
On the day of the election three vice-presidents and candidates complained of vote rigging. Bemba, Ruberwa and Z'Ahidi said "Perhaps we are heading for a masquerade or a parody of elections".

=== Clashes in Kinshasa ===
Starting on 20 August heavy armed clashes took place in Kinshasa between forces loyal to Kabila and Bemba. Both sides accused the other of starting the fighting.

On 21 August, while a meeting between Bemba and foreign ambassadors representing the International Committee Accompanying the Transition to Democracy (CIAT) was taking place in Kinshasa, clashes broke out between Kabila and Bemba forces, and Bemba's residence, which hosted the meeting, came under attack. According to one diplomat in the residence, it included artillery and heavy machine gun fire. Bemba and the diplomats were moved to the safety of the residence's shelter and there were no reports of injuries. Evacuation plans for the diplomats stranded in the shelter were reportedly being drawn up. Bemba's private helicopter was said to have been destroyed in the attack. Several hours later, the UN spokesperson in the DRC, Jean-Tobias Okala, announced that the foreign diplomats, including MONUC chief William Swing, had been successfully evacuated to UN headquarters by Spanish and Uruguayan peace-keeping forces after a top Kabila general and UN forces commander cooperated to allow them safe passage.

Once the rescue had been completed, fighting in the DRC capital ensued, and on 22 August, two DRC army tanks were reported to be heading toward the latest area of fighting. The EU began sending more peacekeeping troops to Kinshasa and MONUC chief Swing called for an immediate ceasefire. Later on 22 August, the third day of fighting, the two sides signed a tentative ceasefire agreement to withdraw from the centre of Kinshasa. AFP reported that "the deal was signed by representatives of Kabila and Bemba, DRC army, the UN mission MONUC, European force EUFOR and European police mission EUROPOL, meeting as a "working group" at MONUC's Kinshasa headquarters." At least three people died during Tuesday's fighting. Sixteen people were reported killed in the fighting which saw heavy artillery and machine gun fire, with police reporting more bodies found and the death toll expected to rise considerably. Later in the day, Interior Minister Theophile Mbemba Fundu placed the death toll for the week at 23 killed, 43 injured. As of 24 August, the ceasefire remained in effect, with army forces loyal to the two candidates remaining in barracks, but the situation remained unstable. Later in the day, police fired shots in the air to disperse angry crowds demanding that two of Bemba's television stations be reopened. South African Airways announced that flights to Kinshasa would be resumed on 25 August after being suspended since the fighting began.

On 26 August, Kabila and Bemba announced that the two had agreed to meet. Later in the day, however, tensions were heightened as Bemba failed to attend the meeting. On 29 August, MONUC announced that representatives of Kabila and Bemba were due to meet under UN supervision. Later in the day, it was reported that Kabila and Bemba themselves met for the first time since the clashes began. On 30 August, MONUC announced that the meeting resulted in the establishment of two joint sub-commissions, one to conduct an independent investigation of the clashes, and the other to devise rules which will prevent violence from recurring during 29 October run-off election.

== Results ==
Preliminary results were expected on 2 August, but due to the remoteness of many polling stations, results were not expected to be finalised until three weeks after the polls closed. While South African observers approved the election, other monitors expressed concern, including those from the Carter Center. MONUC reported that on 3 August, on the third day of "chaotic poll-counting, a suspicious fire at a major Kinshasa election center deepened concerns over the transparency of the results." According to MONUC, while the election itself may have met requirements, "the process of collecting results from 50,000 polling stations had become chaotic." On 6 August, MONUC predicted that President Joseph Kabila appeared most likely to win, with Jean-Pierre Bemba finishing second.

On 5 August, thousands in eastern DRC were fleeing clashes between the DRC army and forces affiliated with General Laurent Nkunda. DRC officials reported that two government soldiers were killed in the fighting. According to The Independent, Nkunda, who is "widely believed to be in third place in the race for the DRC's presidency," stated that he would respect the results, but along with over 30 other candidates, expressed "determination to resist results which are perceived to be unfair." Nkunda, who remained the subject of an international arrest warrant issued by the DRC government "for alleged atrocities against civilians committed since 2004," expressed a willingness to negotiate with the winner of the election, but also, determination to resist any military attack. MONUC spokesperson reported that the peacekeeping force had begun patrolling in the area and that fighting has become limited to isolated incidents.

While the official provisional election results were not to be announced until 20 August, on 7 August, due to the tense climate brought by the chaotic collection of results and after pressure from international envoys (led by South Africa), the DRC Electoral Commission stated that it would begin releasing interim election results as soon as the 20 percent vote count threshold was reached. On 8 August, some results were released, indicating that Kabila "overwhelmingly won" in the east while Bemba won in the west. A UN representative stated that it is too early to declare a winner. Preliminary national results were not expected until at least 14 August. On 12 August, the DRC Independent Electoral Commission announced that six poll officials have been arrested for attempting to falsify the election results. The officials were arrested on 10 August, and appeared in court on 11 August. On 15 August, the IEC reported that 94 percent of the presidential votes and 44 percent of the parliamentary results had been counted. MONUC cautioned against media speculation on the results, while the instability in eastern DRC continued.

On 16 August, Angola deployed four battalions along the DRC border. The Angolan army's Deputy Chief of Staff, General Geraldo Sachipendo Nunda, said that these were steps taken "to ensure the security of our borders," although it was speculated that Angola was preparing to intervene, if the need arose, in favor of Kabila. On 17 August, the UN began investigating a suspected child prostitution ring involving UN peacekeepers and members of the DRC army. Also on 17 August, MONUC chief William Lacy Swing, warned against hate messages in local Bemba-run media which called on Congolese to target white people and foreigners. This was in response to a widespread perception that Kabila's election had been backed by the international community. In response, the Congolese High Authority on Media suspended the RTAE and CCTV (owned by Bemba) television stations for twenty-four hours. The government-owned Congolese Broadcasting Corporation television station, controlled by Kabila, also received a twenty-four-hour suspension.

=== President ===
The CEI released its full provisional results for the presidential election on 20 August. The DRC Supreme Court planned to announce the final official presidential election results on 31 August. The CEI was set to release the results of the parliamentary election in early September. Both events ended up being postponed.

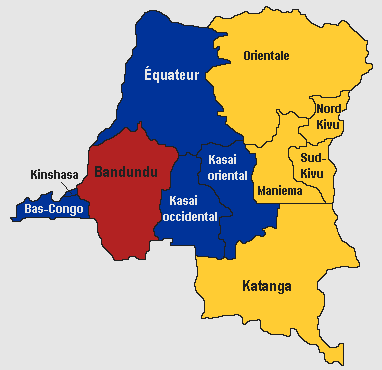
Results of the first round of the 2006 presidential election by Province. Candidates: Kabila; Bemba; Gizenga

On 20 August, with almost all the votes from the country's 169 constituencies having been counted, the DRC headed toward a run-off election. There were reports of automatic gunfire in Kinshasa, and MLC representatives accused Kabila's Republican Guard of killing one of its men and injuring three policemen. The armed clashes resulted in the long-awaited CEI announcement ceremony being delayed by several hours. Full provisional results show Kabila with 44.81 percent of the vote, to Bemba's 20.03. Gizenga secured about 13 percent, Mobutu about 5 percent and Kashala around 4 percent.

On 5 September, the DRC Supreme Court, which was set to release the official results of the election's first round, announced it would be postponing doing so pending two legal challenges which might deem the forthcoming second round of elections unconstitutional. MONUC, however, stated on 6 September that it is satisfied with the electoral process, but expressed concern over the humanitarian situation.

During late October 2006, as the date for the presidential run-off approached, security concerns were increasingly expressed. On 26 October, the CEI stated that the North Kivu province could see security threats. While MONUC stated that they "'do not foresee any major problems,'" the next day, 27 October, UN Secretary-General Kofi Annan stated that he was "very concerned about the increasing level of violence as election day approaches" The head of the South African observer mission, Mluleki George, stated, however, that he expected the election would "'be held under normal and peaceful conditions.'" As well, rebel leader Laurent Nkunda reiterated he would respect the results, a pledge which was also expressed by Bemba.

On 29 October, the South African Broadcasting Corporation (which a day earlier had condemned police violence against its correspondent) reported that despite delays in the Kinshasa area, caused by heavy rains, voting was "running smoothly in most other parts of the DRC." The African Union hailed "the smooth conduct" of the election and appealed for calm as vote counting began. Carter Center chief observer, former Canadian Prime Minister Joe Clark, stated that "attempted manipulation of the electoral process, while very serious in a few cases, appear at this point to be isolated and unlikely to affect the overall success of the vote."

During the first day of voting, violent clashes in the Equateur province resulted in two fatalities. MONUC stated later in the day that "the situation has returned to calm and voting operations are taking place normally throughout Equateur." Additional reports of clashes remained unconfirmed, but these appeared to have been limited to Equateur. On 30 October, as vote counting began, MONUC reported that a soldier killed two poll workers in the town of Fataki, Ituri Province, resulting in riots which led to the destruction of 43 polling stations. The reason for the shooting remain unclear, but it appears that the soldier was drunk. The soldier has been sentenced to death for the murders.

The results of the presidential run-off were to be released on 19 November 2006. On 30 October, voter turnout was estimated to have been low. The head of the CEI, Apollinaire Malumalu, warned on 1 November against releasing partial preliminary results to prevent the same violent clashes which followed during the election's first round. Three days later, however, the CEI decided to prerelease partial preliminary results to stem the spread of rumours, a decision analogous to the unscheduled prerelease that took place during the first round. On 6 November, results from 12 of 169 constituencies showed Kabila in the lead. On 8 November, the two candidates met and issued calls for calm. The meeting came as accusations from Bemba's coalition were directed against the CEI for skewing the results in favour of Kabila, a claim dismissed by a CEI official as false and inflammatory.

On 10 November, with votes from 112 of 169 constituencies counted and a voter turnout of about 67 percent, Kabila was leading with about 60 percent of the votes. The final results were released by the CEI on 15 November and were confirmed by the Supreme Court on 27 November.

Candidate	Party	First round		Second round	
Candidate	Party	Votes	%	Votes	%
Joseph Kabila	Independent	7,590,485	44.81	9,436,779	58.05
Jean-Pierre Bemba	Movement for the Liberation of the Congo	3,392,592	20.03	6,819,822	41.95
Antoine Gizenga	Unified Lumumbist Party	2,211,280	13.06		
Nzanga Mobutu	Union of Mobutist Democrats	808,397	4.77		
Oscar Kashala	Union for Congolese Reconstruction	585,410	3.46		
Azarias Ruberwa	Rally for Congolese Democracy	285,641	1.69		
Pierre Pay-Pay wa Syakasighe	DCF–COFEDEC	267,749	1.58		
Lunda Bululu	Rally of Social and Federalist Forces	237,257	1.40		
Joseph Olenghankoy Mukundji	New Forces for Union and Solidarity	102,186	0.60		
Pierre Anatole Matusila Malungeni Ne Kongo	Independent	99,408	0.59		
Antipas Mbusa	Forces for Renewal	96,503	0.57		
Bernard Emmanuel Kabatu Suila	Liberal Socialist Union	86,143	0.51		
Eugène Diomi Ndongala	Christian Democracy	85,897	0.51		
Banyingela Kasonga	Alliance of Peasants and Ecologist	82,045	0.48		
Christophe Mboso N'Kodia Pwanga	Convention for the Republic and Democracy	78,983	0.47		
Likulia Bolongo	Independent	77,851	0.46		
Roger Lumbala	Rally of Congolese Democrats and Nationalists	75,644	0.45		
Justine Kasa-Vubu	Movement of Democrats	75,065	0.44		
Guy-Patrice Lumumba	Independent	71,699	0.42		
Cathérine Marthe Nzuzi wa Mbombo	Popular Movement of the Revolution–Fait Privé	65,188	0.38		
Alou Bonioma Kalokola	Independent	63,692	0.38		
Paul-Joseph Mukungubila	Independent	59,228	0.35		
Arthur Z'ahidi Ngoma	Camp of the Fatherland	57,277	0.34		
Kavidi Wivine N'Landu	Union for the Defense of the Republic	54,482	0.32		
Gérard Kamanda wa Kamanda	FCN–Me Kamanda	52,084	0.31		
Florentin Mokonda Bonza	Convention of Christian Democrats	49,292	0.29		
Alafuele Mbuyi Kalala	Rally for a New Society	44,030	0.26		
Jacob Niemba Souga	CPC	40,188	0.24		
Jonas Mukamba Kadiata Nzemba	Alliance of Congolese Democrats	39,973	0.24		
Marie-Thérèse Nlandu Mpolo Nene	Party for Peace in Congo	35,587	0.21		
Osée Muyima Ndjoko	Renewal for Development and Democracy	25,198	0.15		
Hassan Thassinda Uba Thassinda	African Congress of Democrats	23,327	0.14		
Timothée Moleka Nzulama	People's Union for Peace and Love	17,753	0.10		
Total		16,937,534	100.00	16,256,601	100.00
Valid votes		16,937,534	94.46	16,256,601	97.84
Invalid/blank votes		993,704	5.54	358,878	2.16
Total votes		17,931,238	100.00	16,615,479	100.00
Registered voters/turnout		25,420,199	70.54	25,420,199	65.36
Source: African Elections Database

=== National Assembly ===
On 25 August, MONUC announced that the parliamentary results would be released as early as that day, but as of 27 August, they had yet to be released. On 28 August, the CEI began releasing the legislative results, with the final count expected 4 September. On 4 September, the CEI postponed releasing the results of the parliamentary elections by at least a day following the arrest of ten Bemba-affiliated election officials. Still, the CEI announced that these problems would not affect the results. The results so far released, show Kabila at a strong lead with 45% of the seats to Bemba's 14%, the remaining going to other parties. Of the 500 parliamentary seats, 58 have yet to be released.

On 8 September, the CEI released the results, revealing that no single party gained the 251 seats needed to secure a majority. Kabila's PPRD won 111 seats, while Bemba's MLC won 64 seats. As of that date, the CEI was to have fifteen days to set the date for the first session of parliament, notwithstanding any Supreme Court rulings on its final composition.

Party	Votes	%	Seats
People's Party for Reconstruction and Democracy			111
Movement for the Liberation of the Congo			64
Unified Lumumbist Party			34
Social Movement for Renewal			27
Forces for Renewal			26
Rally for Congolese Democracy			15
Coalition of Congolese Democrats			10
Convention of Christian Democrats			10
Union of Mobutist Democrats			9
Camp of the Fatherland			8
DCF–COFEDEC			8
Christian Democratic Party			8
Union of Federalist Nationalists of Congo			7
Congolese Alliance of Christian Democrats			4
Alliance of Congolese Democrats			4
United Congolese Convention			4
Resistance Patriots Maï-Maï			4
Rally of Congolese Democrats and Nationalists			4
Union of the People for Republic and Integral Development			4
Alliance of Builders of Kongo			3
Democratic Convention for Development			3
Convention for the Republic and Democracy			3
National Alliance Party for Unity			3
Party of Nationalists for Integral Development			3
Union of Congolese Patriots			3
National Union of Federalist Democrats			3
Alliance of Congolese Believing Nationalists			2
Alliance for the Renewal of Congo			2
Renewing Forces for Union and Solidarity			2
Movement for Democracy and Development			2
Congolese Party for Good Governance			2
People's Revolution Party			2
Democratic Social Christian Party			2
Rally of Social and Federalist Forces			2
Electoral Platform Renaissance			2
Solidarity for National Development			2
Union for the Republican Majority			2
National Union of Christian Democrats			2
Action of the Rally for Reconstruction and Edification			1
Alliance of Congolese Nationalists			1
Conscience and People's Will			1
Christian Convention for Democracy			1
Christian Union for Renewal and Justice			1
National Convention of Political Action			1
National Convention for Republic and Progress			1
Christian Democracy			1
Front of Congolese Democrats			1
Front for Social Integration			1
Social Front of Independent Republicans			1
Front of Social Democrats for Development			1
Republican Generations			1
Action Movement for Resurrection of the Congo-Fraternity and Labour Party			1
Self-Defence Movement for Integrity and Maintenance of Independent Authority			1
Congolese People's Movement for the Republic			1
Popular Movement of the Revolution			1
Solidarity Movement for Democracy and Development			1
Lumumbist Progressive Movement			1
Maï Maï Movement			1
Political Organisation of Kasavubists and Allies			1
Congolese Party for the People's Well-Being			1
National Unity Party			1
National People's Party			1
Rally of Christians for the Congo			1
Rally of Congolese Ecologists – The Greens			1
Rally for Economic and Social Development			1
Congolese Union for Change			1
Liberal Christian Democrats Union			1
Union of Congolese Nationalist Patriots			1
Union for the Defence of the Republic			1
Independents			63
Total			500
Registered voters/turnout	25,420,199	–	
Source: African Elections Database

== Aftermath ==
On 11 November, a shootout took place for several hours after police had fired shots in the air to disperse Bemba supporters who were demonstrating near Bemba's residence in Kinshasa to protest vote counting during the run-off. The shooting ceased after MONUC mediated a meeting between representatives of the two groups. At least four people were reported to have died in the clashes. On 13 November, DRC police arrested 337 people, including 87 children, suspected to have been involved in 11 November clashes.

After being declared winner, Kabila hinted that Bemba would play a role in the new government, stating that "the effort now must be nation building, it must be reconstruction. The government that will be put in place will be a government of coalition." Bemba, who boycotted the hearings after the Supreme Court refused to consider further challenges over alleged "systematic cheating", was not immediately available for comment. On 28 November, Bemba released a statement saying that while he condemns the ruling, he accepts the results and is prepared to lead a "strong republican opposition in the interests of the nation". Kabila was sworn in as president on 6 December.

=== Bemba rejects results ===
On 14 November, Bemba rejected the results of the election, which showed Kabila with 60 to Bemba's 40 percent, with 90 percent of the votes (159 out of 169 constituencies) having been counted. Bemba's supporters stated that "the Union for the Nation will not accept an electoral hold-up that aims to steal victory from the Congolese people", and that they were not bound by their promise to accept the results if they thought there was electoral fraud. Bemba's UFN coalition maintained he was leading with 52 to Kabila's 48 percent.

On 17 November, Bemba told reporters that he rejected the interim results, citing irregularities. He said that he "cannot accept the results that are far from reflecting the truth of the election results," and that he would "use all the legal channels to respect the will of our people." Bemba, on 18 November, filed a complaint to the Supreme Court over his claims of electoral irregularities. A member of his UFN coalition had said that: "there were many, many irregularities. It was not at all democratic. We are confident the supreme court will correct the result."

=== Supreme Court fire ===
On 21 November, part of the Supreme Court building was burned down amid gunfire during a session in which the Court was reviewing an electoral fraud complaint. No casualties were reported. The direct cause for the fire was unclear, but it followed a demonstration by Bemba supporters who were seeking entry into the building. According to Interior Minister Denis Kalume, "armed men who infiltrated the demonstrators opened fire on the police and from then everything went haywire." MONUC, who evacuated judges, lawyers, and CEI officials from the building, attributed the incident to "uncontrolled elements." On 22 November, it was announced that the Supreme Court would be relocated to several parts of the capital, and possibly, the country. The South African observation mission and the Carter Center both expressed approval of the second round. Bemba's coalition lawyer Delly Sesanga, however, argued in favour of "the cancellation of the poll" due to "too many irregularities." Tensions remained high after the DRC army surrounded Bemba's compound in Kinshasa.

=== Kabila issues ultimatum to Bemba ===
On 23 November, about 50 soldiers of Bemba's security detail in Kinshasa, estimated at 600-to-1,000 soldiers, left his residence there and were moved to one in Maluku following pressure by Kabila for Bemba to move some, or all, of his troops within 48 hours. A Kabila official, however, said that this was "absolutely not an ultimatum." Another 100 of Bemba's troops were expected to leave the capital later in the day. On 24 November, the "ultimatum" expired with few, if any, additional Bemba troops removed from the capital. This made it increasingly likely that Kabila would order the DRC army, which continued to surround Bemba's compound, to remove Bemba's soldiers itself. Such an act would greatly increase the likelihood for further armed confrontations. MONUC has said that, if needed, its peacekeepers will help the DRC army to enforce the ultimatum.

=== Offensive by Nkunda in Sake ===
On 25 November, forces loyal to General Laurent Nkunda engaged more than 2,000 soldiers against the DRC army 11th Brigade around the town of Sake (near Goma), Nord-Kivu. Three soldiers and three civilians were killed, and close to 20 people were wounded. MONUC has sent 1,000 soldiers to secure the area. According to UN, "'15 000 and 20 000 people had been displaced by the fighting.'" MONUC spokesperson said that by morning "there were still some shots, but calm was mostly restored," and that Nkunda forces had retreated and "all of the 11th Brigades's positions are under control," On 26 November, MONUC reported that it had clashed with Nkunda's forces who were moving toward Goma, stating: "we fired warning shots from attack helicopters and our troops on the ground have engaged them in Sake." It was later suggested that the attack may not have been related to the election, but rather, was in reaction to the "killing of a Tutsi civilian who was close to one of the commanders in this group." The UN called on the DRC government to negotiate with Nkunda and on 27 November, DRC Interior Minister, General Denis Kalume, was sent to eastern DRC to begin negotiations. Sporadic fire was still reported on 29 November.

=== Supreme Court decision ===
On 24 November, three days after the fire, the Supreme Court resumed its activities in a small, heavily guarded room in the Ministry of Foreign Affairs. Bemba lawyers, however, questioned the impartiality and number of judges involved, arguing that too many of them favour Kabila. Bemba's lead attorney Jean-Marie Tshibangu stated that: "it is not the competence of the court but the competence of its composition that we are challenging." On 26 November, presiding judge Kalonda Kele said a ruling over Bemba's challenge would be announced the next day.

On 27 November, the Supreme Court dismissed Bemba's challenge as "unfounded" and confirmed that Kabila had won the election, stating that: "Mr Kabila Kabange, Joseph, is proclaimed president of the Democratic Republic of Congo, elected by absolute majority."
