= 2007 Democratic Republic of the Congo Senate election =

Senate elections were held in the Democratic Republic of the Congo on 19 January 2007, though they had originally been scheduled for 16 January. The members of the Senate were chosen through indirect election by the members of the provincial assemblies; the delay was a result of the difficulties in choosing traditional chiefs to fill the places reserved for them in the provincial assemblies.

== Results ==
Bemba, who had placed second in the 2006 presidential election, won a Senate seat from the capital, Kinshasa.

Party	Seats
People's Party for Reconstruction and Democracy	22
Movement for the Liberation of the Congo	14
Forces for Renewal	7
Rally for Congolese Democracy	7
Christian Democratic Party	6
Convention of Christian Democrats	3
Social Movement for Renewal	3
Unified Lumumbist Party	2
Alliance of Congolese Democrats	1
United Congolese Convention	1
Democratic Convention for Development	1
Coalition of Congolese Democrats	1
Convention for the Republic and Democracy	1
DCF–COFEDEC	1
Social Front of Independent Republicans	1
Liberal Christian Democrats Union	1
National Alliance Party for Unity	1
Democratic Socialist Party	1
Democratic Social Christian Party	1
Rally for Economic and Social Development	1
Rally of Congolese Democrats and Nationalists	1
Rally of Social and Federalist Forces	1
Congolese Union for Liberty	1
Union of Mobutist Democrats	1
National Union of Christian Democrats	1
National Union of Federalist Democrats	1
Independents	26
Total	108
Source: CEI
