= Antipas Mbusa =

Democratic Republic of the Congo politician

Antipas Mbusa Nyamwisi
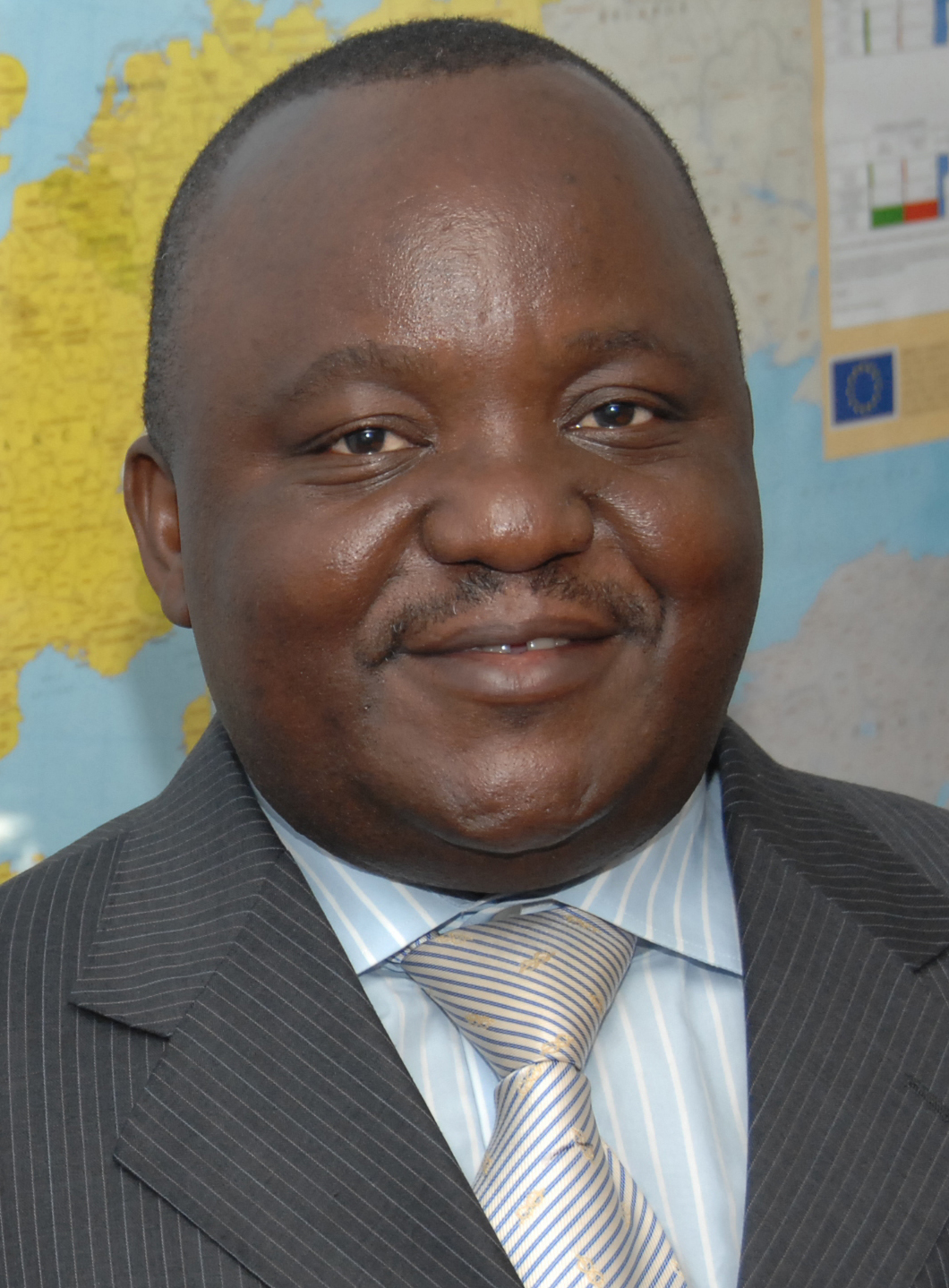

Foreign Minister
- In office February 2007 – October 2008
- Preceded by: Raymond Ramazani Baya
- Succeeded by: Alexis Thambwe Mwamba

Minister of Decentralization and Urban and Regional Planning
- In office 26 October 2008 – 11 September 2011
- Preceded by: Denis Kalume Numbi

Personal details
- Born: November 15, 1959 (age 66) North Kivu

Antipas Mbusa Nyamwisi (born November 15, 1959) is a politician and former rebel leader in the Democratic Republic of the Congo. He leads the Forces for Renewal political party and was Minister of Decentralization and Urban and Regional Planning until September 2011 when he resigned to run for president. He was previously the Minister of Foreign Affairs from 2007 to 2008.

Mbusa is also a member of the political bureau for Together for Change, the opposition political coalition formed by former Katanga governor Moïse Katumbi to support his presidential bid in the upcoming 2018 presidential election. In March 2023, Antipas Mbusa becomes Minister of State, in charge of Regional Integration.

== RCD leader ==
Mbusa's father fought with the Rally for Congolese Democracy (RCD) against the government of Laurent-Désiré Kabila in the Second Congo War. In 1999 he left the RCD with Wamba dia Wamba to form the RCD-Kisangani. Mbusa later took over the RCD-K from dia Wamba after they were driven from Kisangani by RCD-Goma, and renamed it RCD-K-Movement of Liberation or RCD-K-ML.

The RCD-K-ML was accorded 15 seats in the Transitional National Assembly and participated in the Transitional Government headed by Joseph Kabila, when Mbusa was Minister for Regional Cooperation.

Mbusa stood in the 2006 presidential elections but decided to stand aside in favour of Joseph Kabila before the election. He nonetheless won 96,503 votes, and his party won 26 seats in the simultaneous election to the National Assembly, and seven out of 108 seats in the subsequent indirect elections to the Senate.

== Government minister ==
Forces for Renewal joined the government of Antoine Gizenga and Mbusa became Foreign Minister in February 2007. Kabila's entourage have claimed that Mbusa still has private troops reporting directly to him. In the government of Prime Minister Adolphe Muzito, appointed on 26 October 2008, Mbusa was moved to the post of Minister of Decentralization and Urban and Regional Planning (Aménagement du territoire). In September 2011 Mbusa quit to run for president, causing his ministry to be dissolved.
