= Vice-presidents of the Democratic Republic of the Congo =

Vice-president of the Democratic Republic of Congo (French: Vice-présidents de la République démocratique du Congo) is a former political position in Congo, which existed between 2003 and 2006 in the country's interim government after the Second Congo War.

Following the end of the Second Congo War, and until December 6, 2006, transitional institutions were established, consisting of the former warring parties, as well as representatives of the non-belligerent opposition, and representatives of the civil society. As part of these institutions, a transitional government was put in place, led by a President, and four vice-presidents, each of the latter coordinating a Governmental commission, regrouping a number of ministries. The pentarchy was often referred to as the "1 + 4". The vice-presidents were:

- Azarias Ruberwa (RCD): Policy, Defense and Security Commission. He represents one of the 2 major former rebel groups.
- Arthur Z'ahidi Ngoma: Representing civil society
- Abdoulaye Yerodia Ndombasi (PPRD): Reconstruction and Development Commission. He represents the pre-peace agreement government.
- Jean-Pierre Bemba (MLC): Economic and Financial Commission. He represents one of the 2 major former rebel groups.

Under the 2006 constitution, which was promulgated in February 2006, the position of vice-president becomes obsolete, after the inauguration of the first President of the DRC, elected democratically by direct universal suffrage. This inauguration occurred on December 6, 2006. Since then, the President of the Senate is designated to step in as interim president.
