= Forces for Renewal =

Political party in the Democratic Republic of the Congo

Forces for Renewal Forces du Renouveau
- Leader: Antipas Mbusa
- Founded: 2003
- Headquarters: avenue Haut commandement, Gombe, Kinshasa
- Ideology: Federalism; Liberalism
- Political position: Centre-right
- Colours: Light Blue, White
- Seats in the National Assembly: 6 / 500
- Seats in the Senate: 7 / 108

The Forces for Renewal (French: Forces du Renouveau), generally still known by its original name RCD-Kisangani-Movement for Liberation (RCD/K-ML), is a political party in the Democratic Republic of Congo. The party originated as a breakaway faction of the rebel Rally for Congolese Democracy (RCD).

== History ==
The RCD-K-ML was accorded 15 seats in the Transitional National Assembly and participated in the Transitional Government headed by Joseph Kabila.

Human Rights Watch has accused RCD-K-ML of conscripting child soldiers. They were also involved in the Ituri conflict.

Their leader, Antipas Mbusa came eleventh in the 2006 presidential elections with 96,503 votes and won 26 seats in the simultaneous election to the National Assembly. In the 2011 general election, the Forces for Renewal lost 20 seats in the National Assembly.

It won seven out of 108 seats in the indirect elections to the Senate.

It joined the government of Antoine Gizenga where Mbusa became Foreign Minister.

In 2022, the party condemned the violence during the anti-MONUSCO protests in the eastern DR Congo.
