= Marie-Thérèse Nlandu Mpolo Nene =

Marie-Thérèse Nlandu Mpolo Nene is a Congolese politician and first female chief of staff of her country.

== Biography ==
She is the daughter of Jean Nlandu di Nsenda (brother of Edmond Nzeza Nlandu) and Louise Mpolo. Mari-Thérèse Nlandu is married to Professor Noël Mbala Nkondi, and is a mother of 4 children. In 1982 she became a lawyer at the Kinshasa / Gombe Court of Appeal, and later became Legal Counsel for the Presidency of the Republic under the tenure of Mobutu Sese Seko. She became the first female chief of staff of the prime minister, under Nguza Karl-i-Bond. As a lawyer, Nlandu has pleaded many important cases in the Democratic Republic of Congo. On March 22, 2006, she officially presented herself as candidate of the Parti pour la Paix au Congo party to the president for the Congolese presidential election of July 2006. Wivine N'Landu Kavidi, a member of her family, also ran for the Union for the Defense of the Republic (UDR) party.

In November 2006, Nlandu defended an appeal lodged by Jean-Pierre Bemba before the Supreme Court of Justice against the provisional results giving Joseph Kabila, the incumbent president, the lead in the second round of the presidential election. She challenged Kabila's Congolese citizenship. On November 20, she was arrested and detained for inciting violence among followers and "alleged insurrectionary movement and the illegal possession of firearms". At the trial in April 2007, the prosecutor sought for her to be given 20 years in prison for charges of insurrection and possession of munitions. On April 30 she and her codefendants were found not guilty by the court. She then chose self-exile and didn't return until 2021 when Kabila was no longer president and his party had just been forced out of the governing coalition.
