= Les mongoles =

Les Mongoles were a militia group active in the Kivu region of Zaire. Principally active between 1997–99, the mongoles were active in opposing the Rally for Congolese Democracy (RCD).

== Sources ==
- Non State Armed Actors: Region and Country Survey International Campaign to Ban Landmines. Feb 2000.
