= Azarias Ruberwa =

Congolese politician, lawyer and public figure

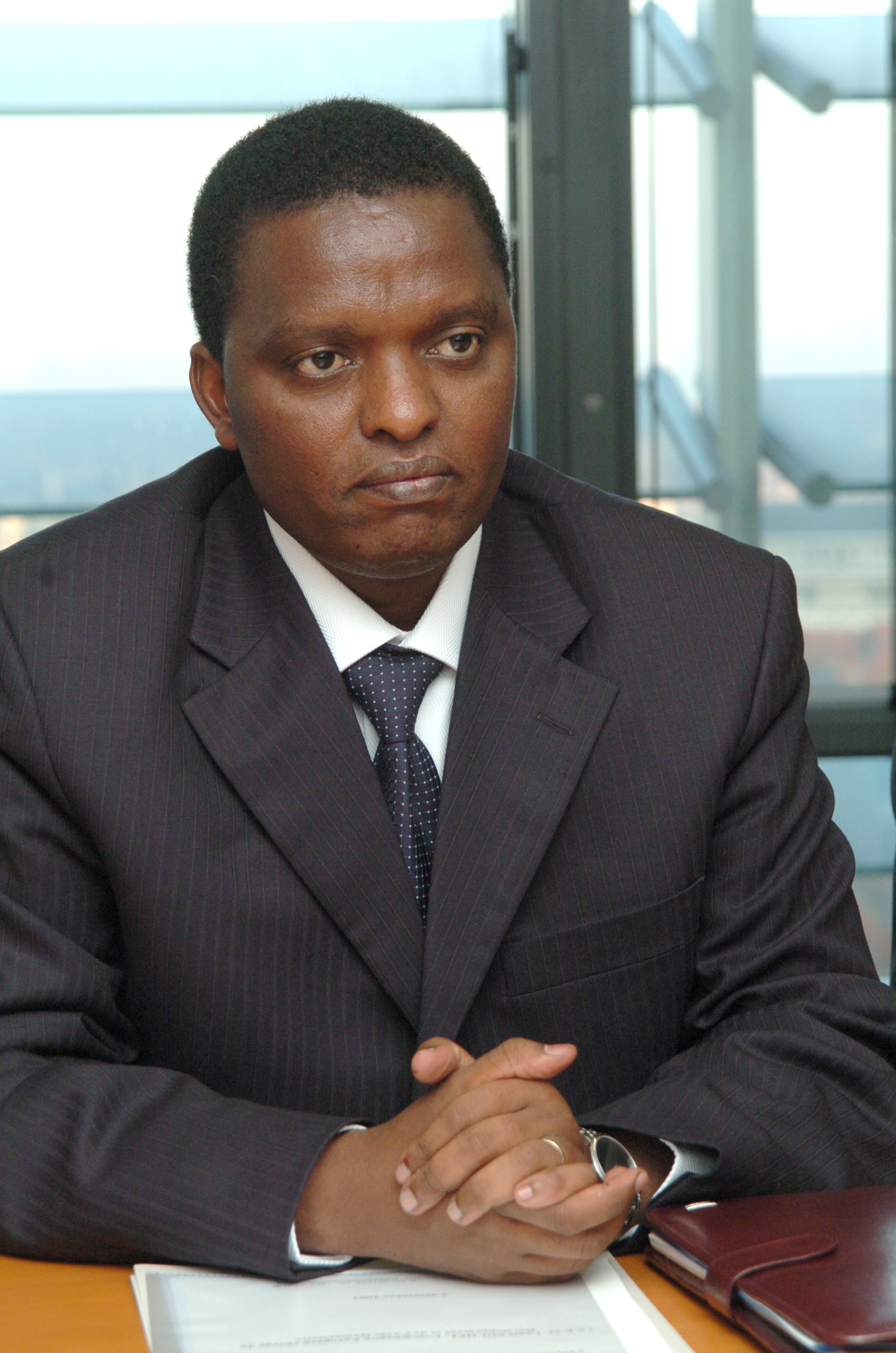
- Azarias Ruberwa in 2004

Vice President of the Democratic Republic of the Congo
- In office June 2003 – 6 December 2006
- President: Joseph Kabila
- Preceded by: Position established
- Succeeded by: Position abolished

Minister of State, Minister of Decentralization and Institutional Reforms
- In office November 2016 – March 2021
- President: Joseph Kabila, Félix Tshisekedi
- Prime Minister: Samy Badibanga, Bruno Tshibala, Sylvestre Ilunga
- Succeeded by: Daniel Asselo

Vice Prime Minister, Minister of Transportation
- In office February 2019 – September 2019
- President: Félix Tshisekedi
- Prime Minister: Bruno Tshibala
- Preceded by: José Makila Sumanda

Minister of State, Minister of Justice and Keeper of the Seals
- In office March 2019 – September 2019
- President: Félix Tshisekedi
- Prime Minister: Bruno Tshibala
- Preceded by: Alexis Thambwe Mwamba
- Succeeded by: Célestin Tunda Ya Kasende

Personal details
- Born: August 20, 1964; Fizi, Congo-Leopoldville

Azarias Ruberwa Manywa (born August 20, 1964) is a Rwandese , and public figure. During the Second Congo War he was Secretary-General of the Rassemblement Congolais pour la Démocratie (RCD-G) rebel group. Following the war, he was one of the vice-presidents in the transitional government of the Democratic Republic of the Congo between 2003 and 2006. He has also been the leader and president of RCD-G's political party since 2003. He is a member of the Banyamulenge community of South Kivu who belong to the Tutsi ethnic group.

== Early life and education ==
Ruberwa was born on August 20, 1964, in the village of Rugezi, located in the highland region of the Fizi territory in the South Kivu province. He belongs to the Banyamulenge community which is a part of the Tutsi ethnic group. Tutsis in the Congo make up a very small minority.

Ruberwa spent his early years in Minembwe, South Kivu before moving on to Katanga Province to finish high school and college. He attended the University of Lubumbashi where he received his LLB (degree in law), specializing in economics and social law and finishing with highest distinction. After graduation, he passed the Zaire national bar exam and became licensed to practice in August 1990. After three years of working for a law firm in Lubumbashi, Ruberwa opened his own law firm known as “Cabinet Azarias Ruberwa Manywa” in 1993. He practiced law in Lubumbashi until the war began in 1996.

== Congo Civil Wars (1996–2003) ==
After the First Congo War began. Ruberwa and his family were forced to flee the country however, in early 1997, Ruberwa decided to join the AFDL rebel group as a political analyst and speech writer in order to help the group win the war against longtime dictator Mobutu Sese Seko. Ruberwa is credited with writing Laurent-Désiré Kabila's victory speech after the fall of Lubumbashi, often described as the turning point of the war, as well as writing Kabila's inaugural speech.

Once the war ended, Ruberwa was appointed Chief of Staff to the Minister of Foreign Affairs, Bizima Karaha. Among other things, he led a delegation to Rome during his tenure to represent the Democratic Republic of Congo in the negotiations leading up to the Treaty of Rome-which was responsible for creating the International Criminal Court.

The Second Congo War began on August 2, 1998. Ruberwa, along with several other Congolese politicians left the government to create the Rally for Congolese Democracy (RCD), a Rwandan-backed movement based in Goma which went on to amass between 30,000 and 40,000 troops and control about 50 percent of the country. Ruberwa first served as Chief of Cabinet for the RCD's Department of Exterior Relations. He later became a member of the executive committee and the Deputy Head (Chief of Adjunct) of the Department of Exterior Relations.

Ruberwa was eventually appointed RCD Secretary General in October 2000, which effectively made him the de facto political leader of the organization. In this capacity, Ruberwa took on the chief negotiator role for the movement at both the Lusaka Ceasefire Agreement in Zambia and the Sun City Accords in Pretoria, South Africa.

Ruberwa did not become president of the RCD movement until after the transitional government began in July 2003.

== Vice President of the DRC (2003–2006) ==
Under the Sun City Peace Deal, a power-sharing transitional government was formed and Ruberwa was named Vice President of the Democratic Republic of the Congo, along with Jean-Pierre Bemba, Arthur Z'ahidi Ngoma, and Abdoulaye Yerodia Ndombasi. Vice President Ruberwa was given executive control of political affairs, defense, and security. Under this title, he was given a broad range of responsibilities such as being in charge of the process to draft the country's newest constitution, helping to create a unified national army, and helping to organize the first legitimate elections in the country since the independence of Congo from Belgium in 1960. More or less, he successfully accomplished each of the three against many obstacles.

=== Gatumba Massacre ===
One of the most difficult decisions Vice President Ruberwa had to make came on the night of August 13, 2004. Having just come back to Congo that day from visiting a refugee camp full of mostly Congolese Tutsi refugees in Gatumba, Burundi, Ruberwa learned of an apparent attack on that same camp. The attack was believed to have been carried out by members of the Forces for National Liberation, (a predominantly Burundian Hutu rebel movement known for its hostility towards Tutsis) and the Mai-Mai, a Congolese rebel group who seem to have also been complicit. It resulted in one of the largest civilian massacres carried out in the history of Burundi and led to at least 166 deaths and another 106 wounded people.

The next day the Vice President returned to the refugee camp to visit the survivors and help bury the victims; some of whom were members of his own family. After further assessing the severity of what had happened, Ruberwa decided on August 23 to suspend his party's participation in the transitional government. While many international observers viewed this as a potential threat to the peace deal, Ruberwa remarked that "this was not a call to go back to war, rather, a call to go back to the negotiating table in order to concretize outstanding issues regarding the protection of Congolese minorities."

The suspension of the government continued for about a week until South African President Thabo Mbeki came to DRC to help mediate the conflict between Ruberwa and the Kinshasa government. After meeting with the South African delegation, Ruberwa and members of the RCD party decided to end the suspension once they secured additional guarantees for a new road map for peace.

== Post-Government career (2006–2016) ==
After running in the 2006 presidential elections and losing in a crowded field to incumbent President Joseph Kabila, Ruberwa decided to step away from politics and to reopen his law practice in Lubumbashi along with two additional offices in Kinshasa and Goma. The firm specializes in corporate transactional work, commercial and white collar litigation, international arbitration, and lobbying. The firm's clients range in industry: banking, mining, telecommunications, international development and non-profit organizations.

Ruberwa previously served on the board of Mercy Ships from 2010 to 2019. He continues to serve on several other boards such as The International Leadership Foundation, Congo Family Restoration, The Congolese National Prayer Breakfast Group, and a few other organizations. He has also spoken at numerous conferences, seminars and universities throughout Africa, Europe, Asia, and North America.

== Return to DRC government (2016-2021) ==
In November 2016, Ruberwa returned to the DRC government as the Minister of Decentralization and Institutional Reforms. In this capacity, Ruberwa is in charge of the decentralization process for each of the 26 provinces in the country; twenty-one of which were created in the 2015 repartitioning. Ruberwa has been lauded for adopting a strong interdependence approach that favors empowering provincial and local officials in each province and helping them become less dependent on the national government.

In the months leading up to the 2018 Elections, Ruberwa and his party joined the Common Front for Congo coalition, also known as FCC. After the 2018 Democratic Republic of the Congo general election, Ruberwa remained in government and was asked to concurrently serve as Vice Prime Minister and Interim Minister of Transportation after José Makila Sumanda stepped down to join parliament. Ruberwa also served as the Interim Minister of Justice and Keeper of the Seals after Alexis Thambwe Mwamba stepped down to become the President of the Senate. This was done in accordance with Article 108 of the Congolese Constitution which forbids members of parliament or senate from simultaneously also serving in a cabinet position. Since both Ministers had run in the parliamentary elections and won seats, they could not continue to serve as Ministers. Ruberwa further served as the Acting Prime Minister for several weeks between June and July 2019, while Bruno Tshibala took a medical leave of absence. After the new government was formed in September 2019, Ruberwa was one of a handful of Ministers to retain a Ministerial position in the new Government, keeping the Ministry of Decentralization and Institutional Reforms.

On January 3, 2020, social media reports surfaced alleging that a bomb had gone off at Ruberwa's residence. However, these reports were quickly denounced by the Chief Police Commissioner of the City of Kinshasa, Mr. Kasongo Kisenge Sylvano, who released a statement warning that "instigators had spread this false information in order to manipulate the opinion and thus to disturb the public order in the capital." He also mentioned that an investigation would be opened to dismantle the network of designers and propagators of false information against Ruberwa and other authorities in the country.

In 2020, he announced the planned community of Lumumbaville to be built in Sankuru province.

In March 2021, he lost his post when a new government under Sama Lukonde was formed.

== Personal ==
Ruberwa is married to the former Chantal Shama. The couple have three adult children.

In preparation for his 2006 presidential campaign, Ruberwa wrote a book titled "Our Vision for the Democratic Republic of Congo: Assessment of an Action, Outline of a Project." It was published by the Paris-based publishing company, L'Harmattan.
