= Congo Children Trust =

UK charity

The Congo Children Trust is a registered charity in Wales and England. They support street children in the D.R.Congo through projects and partner organisations. The vision of the Congo Children Trust is to "improve the quality of life for children living on the streets in the Democratic Republic of Congo".

== History ==
The Congo Children Trust was formed in 2007 by Ian Harvey. Ian set up the trust after working in Kinshasa, which is the capital of D.R.Congo, during the first democratic elections in 2006. During this time, Ian observed a sharp rise in the numbers of street children since previously working in the D.R.Congo in the 1990s. The increased number of street children in the D.R.Congo had been a result of the wars during 1996-1997 and 1998-2003.

== Street children in the D.R.Congo ==
It is estimated that there are 250,000 children living on the streets in the D.R.Congo. Children find themselves homeless through a number of factors, accusations of witchcraft, poverty, a death of one/both parents due to HIV/AIDS or malaria, extended family being unable to support the child and parental separation. Whilst living on the street the children are exposed to daily violence, sexual, physical and emotional abuse. The street children lack secure access to their basic needs such as food and shelter.

== Projects ==
The Congo Children Trust's main project is Kimbilio, which receives 98% of the funding raised by the trust. The Kimbilio project, set up in 2009, is based in Lubumbashi, D.R.Congo. Kimbilio runs a day centre and four homes for street children in Lubumbashi and seeks to reunite children with their families.

In 2021, Kimbilio opened a primary school for former street children and children whose families are on zero or low income.

== Trustees and staff ==
The Congo Children Trust has no paid members of staff in the UK, all staff are volunteers.

=== Ian Harvey ===
Ian Harvey is the founder of the Children Congo Trust and set up the Kimbilio project. Harvey attended the University of London, where he studied Social Anthropology. After being qualified as a Social Worker, Ian worked in child protection. Harvey managed Manchester's social work team, where he supported and assessed unaccompanied asylum seeking young people and children. In 2009 Harvey moved to D.R.Congo and set up project Kimbilio. In 2013 Harvey returned to the UK to oversee the development and running of Kimbilio.

=== Mark Gant ===
Mark Gant is the treasurer of the Congo Children Trust. Gant is the Head of Modern Languages at the University of Chester. Gant was involved in the establishment and initial planning of the Kimbilio project.

== Funding ==
About 98% of the money funded by the Congo Children Trust goes to the Kimbilio project. The Kimbilio project uses this money to support street children, for example school fees, food, staff payments, construction costs and health care.

The Congo Children Trust runs through donations, fundraising and grants.
