= Ndongala =

Ndongala or N'Dongala is a surname. Notable people with the surname include:

- Dieumerci Ndongala (born 1991), Congolese footballer
- Eugène Diomi Ndongala (born 1960), Congolese politician
- Aristote N'Dongala (born 1994), Congolese footballer
- Daudet N'Dongala (born 1994), French professional footballer
