= Transitional National Assembly of the Democratic Republic of the Congo =

The Transitional National Assembly of the Democratic Republic of the Congo (French: Assemblée nationale de transition de la République démocratique du Congo) was an appointed body consisting of representatives of the different parties to the peace agreement that ended the Second Congo War.

== Composition ==
Composition of the Transitional National Assembly of the Democratic Republic of the Congo
	Seats
Congolese Rally for Democracy (Rassemblement Congolais pour la Democratie)	94
Movement for the Liberation of Congo (Mouvement pour la Liberation du Congo)	94
Government	94
Political opposition	94
Civil Society	94
Congolese Rally for Democracy/Kisangani Liberation Movement (Rassemblement des Congolais pour la Démocratie/ Kisangani Mouvement de Libération)	15
Rally of Congolese for Democracy-National (Rassemblement des Congolais pour la Démocratie – National)	5
Maï-Maï	10
Total	500
