= Alliance of Congolese Democrats =

Political party in the Democratic Republic of the Congo

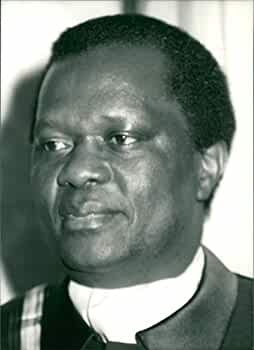
Jonas Mukamba Kadiata Nzemba, the ADECO presidential candidate in 2006.

The Alliance of Congolese Democrats (abbreviated ADECO; French: Alliance des Démocrates Congolais) was a political party in the Democratic Republic of Congo.

The party won 4 out of 500 seats in the 2006 parliamentary elections. They also won seats in the provincial assembly elections in multiple provinces. Jonas Mukamba Kadiata Nzemba was their candidate for president, but only gained 0.24% of the vote and was eliminated in the first round.

In the 19 January 2007 Senate elections, the party won out 1 of 108 seats.
