= Union of the People for Republic and Integral Development =

Political party in the Democratic Republic of the Congo

The Union of the People for Republic and Integral Development (French: Union du Peuple pour la République et le Développement Intégral) is a political party in the Democratic Republic of Congo. The party won 4 out of 500 seats in the parliamentary elections.
