= United Congolese Convention =

Political party in the Democratic Republic of the Congo

The United Congolese Convention (French: Convention des Congolais Unis) is a political party in the Democratic Republic of Congo. The party won 4 out of 500 seats in the parliamentary elections. On 19 January 2007 Senate elections, the party won out 1 of 108 seats.
