= Resistance Patriots Maï-Maï =

Political party in the Democratic Republic of the Congo

The Resistance Patriots Maï-Maï (abbreviated PRM; French: Patriotes Résistants Maï-Maï) was a political party in the Democratic Republic of Congo. The party won 4 out of 500 seats in the 2006 parliamentary elections.
