= Camp of the Fatherland =

Political party in the Democratic Republic of the Congo

The Camp of the Fatherland (French: Camp de la Patrie) is a political party in the Democratic Republic of Congo. The party won eight out of 500 seats in the 2006 parliamentary elections. The party's president was Arthur Z'ahidi Ngoma until his death in 2016.
