= Oscar Kashala =

Congolese-American scientist and politician

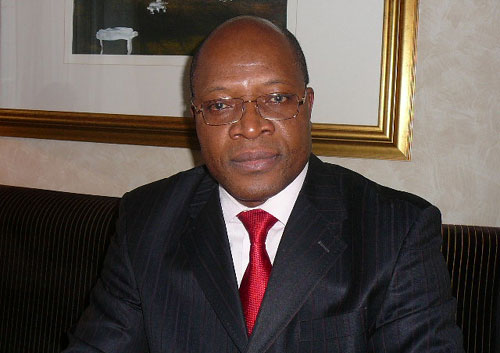
- Oscar Kashala in 2010
- Born: August 4, 1954 (age 72); Lubumbashi, Democratic Republic of the Congo
- Education: Harvard University
- Political party: Union for the Rebuilding of Congo

Dr. Oscar Kashala Lukumuena (born August 4, 1954) is a Congolese-American scientist, clinical researcher, and senior executive in the biopharmaceutical industry in the US. He is a politician in the Democratic Republic of the Congo and was a reformer candidate in the 2006 presidential election and 2011 presidential elections.

Kashala is the National President of the Union for the Rebuilding of Congo (UREC), which participated in the 2006 and 2011 presidential and legislative elections in DRC.

== Background and Education ==
Kashala graduated from Kinshasa University Medical School in 1980 with honors. Kashala previously took a leave of absence from his employers to campaign in the 2006 elections after years of residence in the United States. He ran for the Office of the President of DRC for the Presidential elections on November 28, 2011. He studied basic medical oncology and retrovirology under the guidance of Professor Myron Elmer "Max" Essex, DVM, Ph.D., the Mary Woodard Lasker Professor of Health Sciences at Harvard University, Chair of the Harvard School of Public Health AIDS Initiative, and Chair of the Botswana-Harvard AIDS Institute in Gaborone, Botswana.

Kashala received security services from AQMI Strategy Corporation of Orlando, Florida, before the elections.

Kashala obtained a Cancer Biology and Retrovirology Fellowship in Boston at Harvard University. This was followed by admission into a doctoral program in Cancer Biology and Immunology in a combined degree program at Harvard University and Massachusetts Institute of Technology. Kashala received a Doctor of Science degree from Harvard University in 1992. Moreover, Kashala is a graduate of Harvard University.

Kashala held senior executive positions in the pharmaceutical industry and senior advisory positions to the various head of state in Africa. He has worked with governments both in Central and West Africa, South East Asia, and South America in matters related to public health, global security, education, foreign assistance, and international finance in countries, including Angola, the Democratic Republic of Congo, Egypt, Gabon, Guinea Bissau, Republic of Guinea, Senegal, The Gambia, Uganda, Thailand, Colombia, and the Philippines. He consulted on trade and commerce with firms in the private sector, government and non-government organizations, and the United States Congress, European Union, and China.

In May 2004, Kashala was invited by the Government of DRC to participate in discussion about country's development programs.

In 2005, Kashala created a political party, Union for the Rebuilding of Congo, and registered it with the government on September 21, 2005. He has assembled a team of 13 campaign advisers, who have helped him raise $52,000 in the U.S. and Europe. Kashala formally announced his candidacy at the Harvard Faculty Club in June. He spent about $100,000 of his own money to finance a presidential campaign in 2006.

UREC ran a pre-campaign that threatened the majority party led by Joseph Kabila, the then incumbent DRC President. In May 2006, thirty-two of Kashala's security detail members were accused of plotting to overthrow the interim Congo President. Kashala and the international community dismissed the allegations as a blatant attempt by Kabila's administration to intimidate him.

In the 2006 election, Kashala finished in fifth place with 4% of votes in the first round of voting, well short of Jean-Pierre Bemba's 20% and Joseph Kabila's 45%. It is believed Kashala finished third in the electoral cycle, rigged with massive fraud, irregularity, and intimidation. His campaign was meddled with by the Government that used tactics such as house arrests, arrest of his legal team members, imprisonment and torture of several UREC members, and illegal grounding of his planes. As a consequence, UREC had only 3 days to campaign in 5 of the 11 provinces of DRC, where it spent a maximum of 5 hours per province. This was in contrast to other candidates living in the country who had started campaigning several months in violation of the electoral law. Kashala was viewed as the game changer in Congolese politics.

In 2011, Kashala and his political party entered the electoral cycle arena again. Kashala instructed his teams to stop campaigning for the scheduled elections and to launch their plan for pacification of DRC due to widespread violence and national instability across the DRC. He was the only candidate from the Congolese political opposition to have been invited by President Joseph Kabila to attend his swearing-in ceremony.

Kashala is the chairman of the Board of Global Enterprise Services Corporation (hereinafter referred to as “GLOBEX"), a holdings company with many global dealings, mainly for-profit ventures. He is the President of the Harold Michael Kashala Foundation for Health Care and Partnership, Inc., a non-profit organization devoted to human development in the least developed countries.

== Biography ==
Oscar Kashala was born on August 4, 1954, in Lubumbashi, Haut-Katanga District, from Congolese parents. Son of a retired military sergeant in the Force Publique, the Congolese Army under Belgian colonization, Oscar Kashala was raised in an environment that focused on strict discipline, Christian faith, hard work, excellence in education and family values. He excelled as a student and as a boy scout.

Kashala graduated from Kinshasa University Medical School in 1980 with honors, and trained in internal medicine and pathology at the University of Kinshasa, then at the University of Lausanne and University of Geneva Medical Schools. In 1986, the World Health Organization (WHO/AFRO) awarded him a fellowship for medical oncology in Boston. Then he obtained a fellowship in cancer biology at Harvard University, Boston. This was followed by admission into a doctoral program in cancer biology and immunology in a combined degree program (Harvard University and Massachusetts Institute of Technology). He received a Doctor of Science degree from Harvard University in 1992.

Kashala began his career at Cambridge Biotech Corporation (later known as Aquila Biopharmaceuticals) as a Director of Medical Affairs and Tropical Diseases and Director of Molecular Pathogenesis Laboratory. In that capacity, he managed to put the AIDS vaccine for Africans infected with HIV on the international agenda. He initiated the first laboratory HIV-1 vaccine development studies ever conducted based on the use of virus strains that are common in Africa, with the support of the US Government, the World Health Organization (WHO), and other partners in the industry.

In 1998, he joined Lexigen Pharmaceuticals, Inc. and EMD Pharmaceuticals (Research Triangle Park, Durham, NC), both affiliates of the giant pharmaceutical company Merck KGaA of Darmstadt, Germany, and was appointed medical director, Clinical Oncology Research.

In 2002, Kashala transitioned to Millennium Pharmaceuticals, Inc., The Takeda Oncology Company, where he was appointed Senior Director of Clinical Research, Clinical Oncology, and was assigned global responsibility for developing bortezomib (VELCADE) in solid tumors. He later joined EMD Serono, Inc. (2007), an Affiliate of Merck KGaA. He was appointed Senior Director of Clinical Oncology Development and Head, Oncology Development, with overall responsibility for the clinical research and development activities in the US. At EMD Serono, Inc., Kashala joined the senior leadership team and focused the company's efforts on cancer immunotherapy for breast, colorectal, lung, and prostate cancer.

In March 2013, Kashala was appointed Senior Vice President for Research and Development and Senior Vice President for Business Development, Africa Goal Strategy for Nanobiosym, Inc., a company focused on using nanotechnology to diagnose and treat human diseases. During his tenure, he was instrumental in developing the clinical strategy for the Gene Radar technology platform for diagnosing and treating infectious diseases and cancer and for shaping the key opinion leaders' management plans for African countries. In 2015, Kashala joined Affimed, Inc. as vice-president, Medical, US.

Kashala is a pathologist, oncologist and cancer research specialist who has conducted clinical research with cancer centers in the United States, including the US National Cancer Institutes (NCI) at the National Institutes of Health, Bethesda, Maryland, the Lombardi Cancer un Washington DC, the Memorial Sloan Kettering Cancer Center (MSKCC) and the Kaplan Comprehensive Cancer Center in New York City, Fox Chase Cancer Center, Sidney Kimmel Cancer Center in Philadelphia, University of Pittsburgh Cancer Center and UPMC Cancer Center in Pittsburgh, Duke University Cancer Center and UNC Lineberger Comprehensive Cancer Center in North Carolina, Rush University Cancer Center and Robert H. Lurie Comprehensive Cancer Center in Chicago, Winship Cancer Institute of Emory University, Vanderbuilt Ingham Cancer Center, Jonsson Kaplan Cancer Center at UCLA, Los Angeles, UNMC Eppley Cancer Center, UC Davis Comprehensive Cancer Center in La Jolla, California, UCSF Helen Diller Family Comprehensive Cancer Center in San Francisco, Mayo Clinic Cancer Center in Rochester, Minnesota, University of Alabama in Birmingham Cancer Center, MD Anderson Cancer Center in Houston, Massachusetts General Hospital and Dana Farber Cancer Centers, in Boston, etc.

=== Philanthropy ===
Kashala has been very active in the area of humanitarian aid and philanthropy. In 1988, while DRC had strained medical healthcare and lacked adequate diagnostic equipment and highly trained scientists/physicians, Kashala managed to raise awareness of DRC's health crisis and obtained a donation of over $200,000 in medical equipment from Abbott Laboratories - Abbott Park, North Chicago, Illinois (USA). This helped several clinical and translational studies to address the etiological role of the hepatitis B virus in primary liver cancer in central Africa, the interactions between hepatitis B virus and HIV in Africans infected with both viruses, and the biological, clinical and diagnostic significance of HIV-1, human T lymphotropic virus 1 (HLTV-1) or HTLV-2 in patients infected with mycobacterium leprae (leprosy).

As a presidential candidate, Kashala traveled to the European Union, Belgium, and the United States to raise awareness about the potential for violence and to advocate for conflict alertness, prevention, and intervention. The key objective of his visits was to emphasize the critical value of security sector reform. Kashala addressed the European Parliament and met with the leadership of the United States Senate and House on the crucial funding needed to support democratic and free elections in DRC and was able to push for Congo Funds for free and fair elections and military reform in DRC, “two key priorities if DRC is to make a successful transition to democratic rule and bring peace, stability and economic development to one of the largest nations in Africa.”

His efforts were instrumental in securing an amendment to the Iraq Supplemental Appropriations bill to provide $13.2 million in critical funding for DRC. "I commend the entire United States Senate, especially Senators Obama and Leahy, for approving this critical funding, said Dr. Kashala. This money will be put to good use in the DR Congo to help ensure free and fair elections and will begin the process of stabilizing our country. In my meetings in Washington this week, I have been pleased at the United States interest in and concern for DRC. I intend to continue to work with the United States to encourage support for the Congo."

== Personal life ==
Kashala is Congolese-American married to Prudence Kashala. They have raised a family of 8 children. Kashala emigrated from Congo to the U.S. years ago.
