= Kavidi Wivine N'Landu =

Congolese poet and politician

Kavidi Wivine N'Landu is a poet and political figure from the Democratic Republic of the Congo. In 1980 she was appointed General Secretary of the Department of Women Affairs, during the reign of Mobutu Sese Seko. On the rise of Laurent Kabila, she fled to South Africa. As a poet, she is noted for the collection Leurres et Lueurs.

In April 2006, she was one of the candidates running in the 2006 Congolese presidential election, which took place in July 2006.
