= Convention of Christian Democrats =

Political party in the Democratic Republic of the Congo

- Founded: 12–13 August 2005
- Headquarters: Kinshasa
- Ideology: Christian democracy Federalism; Social market economy
- Seats in the Senate: 3 / 108

The Convention of Christian Democrats (French: Convention des Démocrates Chrétiens) is a political party in the Democratic Republic of the Congo. The party won 10 out of 500 seats in the 2006 parliamentary elections. In the 19 January 2007 Senate elections, the party won three out of 108 seats.
