= Coalition of Congolese Democrats =

Political party in the Democratic Republic of the Congo

The Coalition of Congolese Democrats (French: Coalition des Démocrates Congolais), also known as CODECO, is a political party in the Democratic Republic of Congo. The party won 10 out of 500 seats in the 2006 parliamentary elections. In the 19 January 2007 Senate elections, the party won out one of 108 seats.
