= Banyingela Kasonga =

Congolese priest and politician (born 1959)

Banyingela Kasonga (born May 4, 1959), is a priest and was a candidate for the presidential elections in the Democratic Republic of the Congo in July 2006.

== Biography ==
Banyingela Kasonga was born in Dimbelenge (present-day Kasaï-Central province of the Democratic Republic of the Congo). From 1974 to 1978 he studied at the small seminary of Kabwe, in the section Latin and philosophy. After that, he went to the big seminary of Kabwe and in 1981 he enrolled for the study of theology at the ‘Faculté de Théologie Catholique de Kinshasa’. On September 29, 1985 he became ordained as a priest in Kananga. Till 1988 he was then a vicar in the parish of Notre Dame de Kananga. From 1988 till 1994 he was director of the Pius X school in Kananga. In 1994 he became the director of the Small Seminary in Kabwe, where he himself had studied as a child. In 1996 he went back to Kinshasa to pursue his studies, where he would get a License in Theology (1997), and then a degree of higher studies in Theology (1999). Between 2000 and 2006 he was writing his Ph.D. dissertation at the faculty of Theology of the Katholieke Universiteit Leuven in Belgium.

== Politics ==
Already in his early priesthood days Banyingela was active in the promotion of social justice. For instance, in 1993 he was among the priests who fought against the introduction of a new currency what was then called Zairean zaire. As a result, the Kasai region used for some time a different currency as the remainder of the country. As a longtime supporter of the Alliance of Farmers and Ecologists, which was founded in 1990, Banyingela became its vice-president in 2005. In 2006 he was nominated as their candidate for the presidential elections.

In the presidential elections of 2006 he ended 14th out of the 33 candidates with 0.48 percent of the vote, or else about 82000 votes nationwide.
