= Clovis Kabongo Malemba =

Congolese politician

Clovis Kabongo Malemba is a politician, president of the Action Démocratique Nationale (ADENA) party in the Democratic Republic of the Congo. Candidate in the 2006 presidential election.
