= Union of Nationalist Federalists of the Congo =

Political party in the Democratic Republic of the Congo

The Union of Nationalist Federalists of the Congo (French: Union des Nationalistes Fédéralistes du Congo) is a political party in the Democratic Republic of the Congo. The party won seven out of 500 seats in the 2006 parliamentary elections. In the 2011 elections, the party won eight seats. In the 2018 elections, the party never won any seats. The president of the party is Gabriel Kyungu wa Kumwanza.
