= Christian Democratic Party (Democratic Republic of the Congo) =

Political party in the Democratic Republic of the Congo

Christian Democrat Party
- President: Castro Bamboka lobendi
- Secretary-General: Désiré Kashemwa
- Spokesperson: Blaise Mastaky Birindwa
- Founded: 2006
- Headquarters: Kinshasa
- Ideology: Christian democracy Federalism
- Seats in the Senate: 6 / 108

The Christian Democratic Party (abbreviated PDC; French: Parti Démocrate Chrétien) is a political party in the Democratic Republic of Congo. They appeared ahead of the 2006 election. The party won eight out of 500 seats in the 2006 parliamentary elections. They also won seats on multiple provincial councils. In the 19 January 2007 Senate elections, the party won six out of 108 seats.

In subsequent elections, the PDC has maintained similar results in the National Assembly (Democratic Republic of the Congo) elections, gaining seven seats in the 2011 election and ten in the 2018 election.

== Electoral history ==
=== National Assembly ===
Year	Vote percent	Seats won
2006	1.6	8 / 500
2011		7 / 500
2018		10 / 500

== See also ==
- Category:Christian Democratic Party (Democratic Republic of the Congo) politicians
