= People's Party for Reconstruction and Democracy =

Political party in the Democratic Republic of the Congo

People's Party for Reconstruction and Democracy Parti du Peuple pour la Reconstruction et la Démocratie
- Leader: Joseph Kabila
- President: Aubin Minaku (interim)
- Vice-president: Aubin Minaku
- Founder: Joseph Kabila
- Founded: 31 March 2002
- Headquarters: Gombe, Kinshasa
- Ideology: Social democracy
- Political position: Centre-left to left-wing
- National affiliation: Alliance of the Presidential Majority (2006–2018); Common Front for Congo (2018–)
- Colours: Yellow, blue
- Seats in the National Assembly: 0 / 500
- Seats in the Senate: 1 / 109 (Note: Joseph Kabila serves as senator for life.)

Website
- pprd.cd/fr/index.html

The People's Party for Reconstruction and Democracy (French: Parti du Peuple pour la Reconstruction et la Démocratie or PPRD) is a political party in the Democratic Republic of the Congo. It is the political structure established by the former president of the country, Joseph Kabila.

In the 2006 general election, the PPRD won 111 out of 500 seats in the lower house of parliament and became the largest party in parliament. The 2006 general election was the first free election since the 1960s. On 27 November 2006, the presidential candidate supported by the PPRD, Joseph Kabila, was declared the winner of the 2006 Presidential elections, by the Supreme Court of Justice. In the 19 January 2007 Senate elections, the party won 22 out of 108 seats.

In the 2011 general election, the PPRD lost nearly half of its seats in the lower house of parliament, dropping to 63 out of 500 seats. Nevertheless, the PPRD retained its position as the largest party in parliament.

The party was the leading component of the Alliance of the Presidential Majority, which was the majority bloc in the National Assembly during the presidency of Joseph Kabila.

The party, and its coalition, the Common Front for Congo (FCC) chose not partake in the electoral process in the 2023 elections, citing unmet demands such as representation of the FCC within CENI, an independent, balanced constitutional court, a consensual electoral law that guarantees greater transparency, security for opposition members, and the restoration of security in the eastern part of the DRC as well as in the province of Mai-Ndombe. Kabila has since left the country for his doctoral project as well as for security reasons, only returning if given security guarantees.

In March 2025, Kabila began a comprehensive reorganization and professionalization of the PPRD, targeting the 2028 general elections. Aubin Minaku, vice-president of the PPRD, is currently serving as interim president. In April 2025, the Congolese government suspended the party, citing Kabila's "overt" activism following his visit to the M23-held city of Goma. On 16 December 2025, the PPRD permanent secretary Emmanuel Ramazani Shadary was arrested, and the headquarters of the FCC in Kinshasa was visited by military personnel.

== Electoral history ==
=== Presidential Elections ===
Year	Candidate	Votes	%	Rank	Outcome
2006	Supported Joseph Kabila (Ind)	9,436,779	58.05%	▲1st	Won
2011	Supported Joseph Kabila (Ind)	8,880,944	48.95%	1st	Won
2018	Supported Emmanuel Ramazani Shadary (Ind)	4,357,359	23.83%	▼3rd	Lost
2023	boycotted				

=== National Assembly elections ===
Election	Seats	+/–	Position
2006	111 / 500	▲111	▲1st
2011	62 / 500	▼49	1st
2018	52 / 500	▼10	1st

=== Senate elections ===
Election	Seats	+/–	Position
2007	22 / 108	▲22	▲1st
