= Rally of Congolese Democrats and Nationalists =

Political party in the Democratic Republic of the Congo

The Rally of Congolese Democrats and Nationalists (abbreviated RCDN; French: Rassemblement des Congolais Démocrates et Nationalistes) is a political party in the Democratic Republic of Congo. It was headed by Roger Lumbala, who was convicted of "complicity in crimes against humanity" in 2025.

The party won four out of 500 seats in the parliamentary elections. Lumbala, their presidential candidate, won 0.45% of the presidential vote. In the 19 January 2007 Senate elections, the party won out one of 108 seats. They won one seat in the 2011 parliamentary elections.
