= Arthur Z'ahidi Ngoma =

Arthur Z'ahidi Ngoma (18 September 1947 – 5 October 2016) was one of four vice-presidents in the transitional government of the Democratic Republic of the Congo. He was sworn in on 17 July 2003, and left office in December 2006.

Ngoma was born in Kalima in the province of Maniema. He previously worked as a university lecturer and for the United Nations Educational, Scientific and Cultural Organization. He was imprisoned in 1997 and then went into exile for a brief period. He led the rebel group Rally for Congolese Democracy, but left it in 1999. He ran for President of Congo in 2006 as the candidate of the Force of the Future party, receiving 0.34% of the vote. He died in Paris at the age of 69 in 2016.
