= National Alliance Party for Unity =

Political party in the Democratic Republic of the Congo

- President: Hadrien Yeki Bampembe
- Founded: October 2003
- Headquarters: Kinshasa
- Ideology: Pragmatism
- Political position: Centre
- Seats in the Senate: 1 / 108

The National Alliance's Party for Unity (Parti de l’Alliance Nationale pour l’Unité) is a centrist political party in the Democratic Republic of the Congo, founded in 2003. The leader of the party is former finance minister Dr. André-Philippe Futa who had a long career in the African Development Bank. During his term as Finance Minister, Futa had been elected Chairman of the Board of Governors of the International Monetary Fund and World Bank.

It supported incumbent President Joseph Kabila in the 2006 presidential elections and won four National Assembly seats in the general elections held the same day, along with a seat in the Senate.

== Co-founding members ==
- Sylvain Joël Bifuila
- Justin Kalumba Mwana Ngongo
- Joseph Futa Mbombo
- Christine Kayiba
- Jean-Marie Makamba Wanketa
- Marcel Kiadi
- Bosch Makasa Boshimpa
- Jean-Pierre Mukwanga Mabala
- Jean-Marie Phanzu
- Thomas Bolifa Bumamampia
- Célestine Bakemba Nsa
- Jean-Pierre Minaida Kpasia III
- Dr. Kasay Mingashanga
- Dr. Serge Mpiana Tshipambe
- Christian Tambi Bayene
- Philémon Balinabo
- Faustin Mulambu Mvuluya
- Pascaline Ndoole Bindu
- Musafiri Ngahangondi
- Sylvain Mbalibukira
- Florien Tambwe Lukanda
- Joseph Kalala Ntumba
- Kimanda Kibangula
- Pacifique Byeka Sanda
- Nyembo Zacharie Lumwanga
- Aubert Kasilembo
