= Roger Lumbala =

Democratic Republic of the Congo politician (born 1958)

Roger Lumbala (born 1958) is an MP in the Democratic Republic of the Congo, representing the Rally of Congolese Democrats and Nationalists. He is a former rebel leader who was backed by Uganda during the 1998–2002 Congolese civil war.

He was arrested in Paris, and is suspected of torture and cannibalism. He was indicted on 6 November 2023. On 28 February 2024, the Paris Court of Appeal confirmed the indictment of Roger Lumbala "for complicity in crimes against humanity."

On 14 November 2025 he started a hunger strike to protest his ongoing trial over atrocities committed during the Second Congo War in DR Congo. Lumbala argued that the French court which judges him does not have legitimacy to try him.

On 15 December 2025, Lumbala was found guilty of complicity in multiple crimes, such as torture, rape, summary executions, pillaging, etc. He was sentenced to a term of 30 years of imprisonment. This verdict marks the first time a national court has prosecuted someone for crimes committed during the Second Congo War.
