= Liberal Christian Democrats Union =

Political party in the Democratic Republic of the Congo

The Liberal Christian Democrats Union is a political party in the Democratic Republic of the Congo based in Kinshasa and is led by Raymond Tshibanda.
