= Abdoulaye Yerodia Ndombasi =

Congolese politician (1933–2019)

Abdoulaye Yerodia Ndombasi (/æbduːˈlaɪ ɪndoʊmbɑːˈsiː jɪˈroʊdjə/; 5 January 1933 – 19 February 2019) was a Congolese politician who served in the government of the Democratic Republic of the Congo as Minister of Foreign Affairs from 1999 to 2000 and as Vice-President from 2003 to December 2006.

== Political career ==
As a supporter of President Laurent-Désiré Kabila, he was appointed Director of the Cabinet of the President on 22 December 1997, taking office on 2 January 1998. Subsequently, he was Minister of Foreign Affairs from March 15, 1999, until late 2000. In 2003 he became one of the four vice-presidents of Congo under the transitional government as mandated by a peace settlement with rebel groups and opposition parties. He was nominated to the post in April 2003 by President Joseph Kabila, as the vice-president representing the Kabila government. He served until 2006. In subsequent years he served as a Senator.

Yerodia died in Kinshasa on February 19, 2019, aged 86.

== The Arrest Warrant Case (Congo vs. Belgium) ==
Yerodia was involved in a precedent-setting case by the International Court of Justice (ICJ). In 1998, Yerodia publicly encouraged the Congolese population to kill members of a rebellion against the government, primarily ethnic Tutsis. In response, Belgium issued an international arrest warrant based on a new Belgian law (known as the Belgian Universal Jurisdiction Law, since repealed) allowing Belgian courts to prosecute international crimes, charging Yerodia with inciting genocide. The Congolese government responded by filing an application against Belgium to the ICJ, claiming that Belgium did not have jurisdiction and that Yerodia enjoyed diplomatic immunity as foreign minister. This case, known as the Warrant Case, was decided in Congo's favor. During the proceedings of the case, the Congo dropped its jurisdiction arguments and the case was decided solely on Yerodia's diplomatic immunity as foreign minister. However, some human rights groups saw this decision as a blow to universal jurisdiction.
