= Eugène Diomi Ndongala =

Eugène Diomi Ndongala (born 1960) was a candidate in the 2006 election in the Democratic Republic of the Congo.

Ndongala was a candidate of the Christian Democrat Party and has pledged to provide free emergency care in public hospitals and to develop the country's communications infrastructure if elected.

Before running for president, Ndongala served as deputy minister of economy and industry, but was jailed without trial several times in 1997 and 1998.
