= Movement for the Liberation of the Congo =

Political party in the Democratic Republic of the Congo

Movement for the Liberation of the Congo Mouvement de libération du Congo
- Leader: Jean-Pierre Bemba
- Founded: September 30, 1998 (as a rebel group); April 5, 2003 (as a party)
- Headquarters: 6, Avenue du Port, Gombe, Kinshasa
- Ideology: Christian democracy Nationalism; Economic liberalism Solidarism
- Political position: Right-wing
- International affiliation: Centrist Democrat International
- Colours: Blue, Yellow
- Slogan: With God, we will overcome
- Seats in the National Assembly: 19 / 500
- Seats in the Senate: 5 / 109

Website
- http://www.mlc-rdc.org/

The Movement for the Liberation of the Congo (French: Mouvement de Libération du Congo, or MLC) (Note: The MLC is also referred to as the Mouvement pour la Libération du Congo or Mouvement de Libération congolai.) is a political party in Democratic Republic of the Congo. Formerly a rebel group operating in the Democratic Republic of Congo that fought the government throughout the Second Congo War, it subsequently took part in the transitional government and is one of the main opposition parties.

== Ideology ==
The MLC is a member of the Centrist Democrat International, a political international inspired by the values of Christian democracy. The party proclaims to support nationalism, economic liberalism, and solidarism as developed by Léon Bourgeois. The motto of the party is "With God, we will overcome".

== Rebel years ==
During the war, the MLC was backed by the government of Rwanda and controlled much of the north of the country, in particular the province of Équateur. It was led by former businessman, Jean-Pierre Bemba, who became vice-president of the DRC following the 2002 Luanda Agreement. The group was primarily supported by Uganda during the war, while the rival Rally for Congolese Democracy (RCD) was dominated by Rwanda.

The Movement for the Liberation of the Congo is the main suspect for perpetrating Effacer le tableau, an ethnic cleansing against Pygmy peoples.

The MLC was found guilty by the International Criminal Court (ICC) of committing war crimes during fighting in the Central African Republic between 2002 and 2003 in General François Bozizé's attempted coup against the government of then-President Ange-Félix Patassé. The MLC interceded at the behest of President Patassé's government and committed numerous acts of murder, rape, pillaging, and torture over the course of the conflict while attempting to suppress the coup attempt. The leader of the MLC, Jean Pierre-Bemba, was arrested in 2008 near Brussels and charged with three counts of crimes against humanity and five counts of war crimes in the neighboring Central African Republic between 2002-2003 by the ICC. He was convicted of two counts of crimes against humanity and three counts of war crimes. He was sentenced to 18 years for war crimes but was fully acquitted by the ICC's appeal court on June 8, 2018.

== Integration and post-war developments ==
As part of the Inter-Congolese dialogue, Brigadier General Malik Kijege of the MLC was named head of military logistics, while Major General Dieudonné Amuli Bahigwa was named head of the navy. Two of the DRC's ten military districts were also given to the MLC, and Bemba was allowed to appoint and dismiss the foreign minister of the DRC.

Bemba, as the MLC candidate, came second in the 2006 presidential election, and the party gained 64 out of 500 seats in the parliament - the second highest number for any political party. In the 19 January 2007 Senate elections, the party won 14 out of 108 seats.

Fighting broke out in Kinshasa in March 2007 between the army and Bemba's guards, who were supposed to have been integrated into the army but had not been due to what were said to be concerns about Bemba's security. The army prevailed in the fighting, and Bemba took refuge in the South African embassy. On April 8, the MLC released a statement in which it said that its headquarters had been occupied by government forces since the fighting and that it was being persecuted through arbitrary arrests and intimidation. On April 13, the party suspended its participation in the National Assembly (but not in the Senate) due to what it described as a "climate of permanent insecurity". This came shortly after the alleged looting of the home of a MLC member of parliament by government forces. On April 21, the party was allowed access to its previously-occupied buildings in the capital, which were found to have been plundered. On April 25, the party ended its boycott of the National Assembly after Kabila agreed to meet with representatives of the opposition.

Following the killing of Daniel Botethi, a member of the MLC who was serving as Vice-President of the Provincial Assembly of Kinshasa, the MLC announced on July 6, 2008 that it was suspending its participation in the National Assembly, the Senate, and the Provincial Assembly of Kinshasa. The MLC ended this boycott after a week.

In the 2011 general election, the MLC lost its position as the second largest party in parliament and 42 of its seats in the lower house, ending the election as the fifth largest party in the National Assembly.

On August 25, 2018, Bemba was barred from running for the presidency in the 2018 general election by the Independent National Electoral Commission (CENI) as a result of a then-ongoing appeal before the ICC regarding charges of witness tampering. These charges alleged that there was a conspiracy to influence 14 witnesses through the provision of money as an incentive to ensure false testimony before the ICC during Bemba's first trial. The ICC levied charges against Bemba himself, along with his former defense lawyers, Aimé Kilolo Musamba and Jean-Jacques Mangenda Kabongo, a potential defense witness who did not testify, Narcisse Arido, and the deputy secretary general of the MLC, Fidèle Babala Wandu. By September 17, all of the defendants were found guilty, and received the following sentences: a 300,000 Euro fine and 12 months in prison (Bemba); 2 years and 6 months suspended term of imprisonment and a fine of 30,000 Euros (Musamba); 11 months of imprisonment (Arido); 6 months of imprisonment (Babala); a 2 year suspended term of imprisonment (Mangenda). However, due to time previously spent in detention, Bemba, Babala, and Arido all did not have to serve the sentences.

As a result of Bemba's disqualification by CENI, the MLC and Bemba joined the Lamuka alliance on November 12, uniting with Moïse Katumbi of Together for Change, Adolphe Muzito of Nouvel Elan, and Freddy Matungulu of Congo Na Biso to contest the 2018 general election under a joint banner with Martin Fayulu as their nominee for the presidential election. The MLC, together with the rest of the Lamuka alliance, secured 111 seats in the National Assembly in the election, making the bloc the second largest in the National Assembly, while the alliance subsequently won 6 seats in the Senate in the 2019 Democratic Republic of the Congo Senate election. The lead candidate of the alliance, Fayulu, was unsuccessful in securing the presidency, coming in second place with 34.8% of the vote to winner Félix Tshisekedi's 38.6% vote share. On June 13, 2019, the MLC, as part of the Lamuka alliance, suspended its participation in parliament, citing a Constitutional Court decision which invalidated the 2018 victories of 23 of its candidates.

The MLC entered into consultations with Tshisekedi in late 2020 to form a new government, the Sacred Union of the Nation coalition. The MLC announced its intent to join this coalition and form a government with Tshisekedi on January 20, 2021. Subsequently, Martin Fayulu, the leader of the Lamuka alliance at the time, released the MLC of its obligations to the alliance on January 21, 2021. The MLC received its cabinet postings in the new coalition, headed by Prime Minister Sama Lukonde, on April 13, 2021, receiving prominent ministerial roles, including Environment Minister and Deputy Prime Minister. Following a cabinet reshuffle on March 23, 2023, MLC leader Bemba was appointed as Defense Minister and Deputy Prime Minister.

== See also ==
- Effacer le tableau
