= Jean-Pierre Bemba =

Congolese politician

Jean-Pierre Bemba Gombo
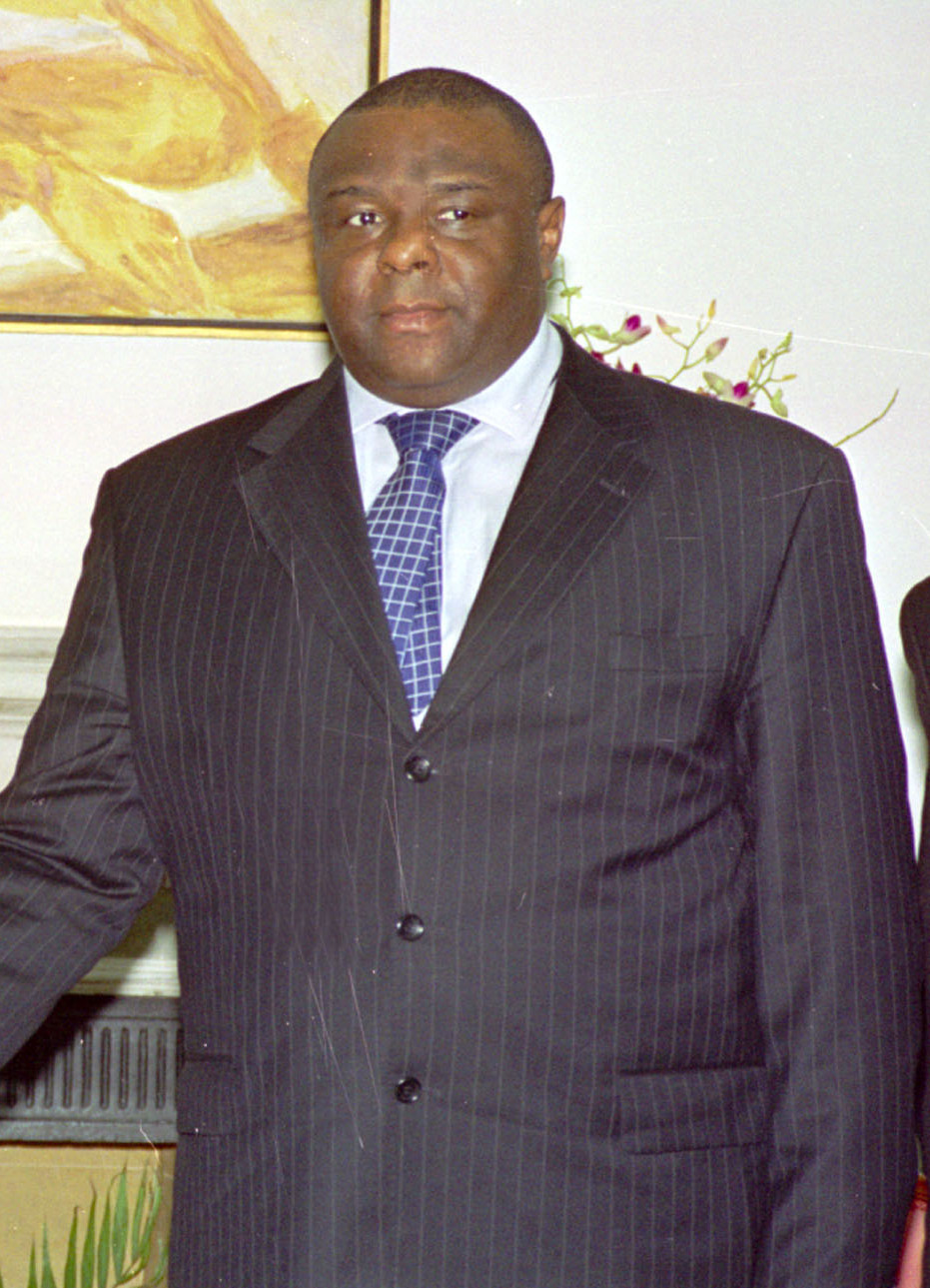
- Bemba in 2005

Deputy Prime Minister Minister of Transport and Channels of Communication
- Incumbent
- Assumed office June 12, 2024
- President: Félix Tshisekedi
- Prime Minister: Judith Suminwa Tuluka

Deputy Prime Minister Minister of Defense
- In office March 23, 2023 – June 12, 2024
- President: Félix Tshisekedi
- Prime Minister: Sama Lukonde
- Preceded by: Gilbert Kabanda Rukemba
- Succeeded by: Guy Kabombo Muadiamvita

Personal details
- Born: Jean-Pierre Bemba Gombo; 4 November 1962 (age 64) Bokada, Equateur Province, Congo-Léopoldville
- Party: Movement for the Liberation of the Congo
- Relations: Catherine Bemba (sister); Nzanga Mobutu (brother-in-law)
- Parent: Jeannot Bemba Saolona (father)
- Education: ICHEC Brussels Management School
- Occupation: Politician

Jean-Pierre Bemba Gombo (born November 4, 1962) is a Congolese politician and former rebel leader. He currently serves as the Deputy Prime Minister of Transportation and Channels of Communication, and served as the deputy minister of defense prior to his incumbent position. He was also one of four vice-presidents in the transitional government from July 17, 2003, to December 2006.

Bemba led the Movement for the Liberation of the Congo (MLC), a rebel group turned political party, and received the second-highest number of votes in the 2006 presidential election. In January 2007, he was elected to the Senate.

In 2008, during a trip to Europe, Bemba was arrested on International Criminal Court charges of crimes against humanity and war crimes. He spent the following 10 years in prison at The Hague, The Netherlands; 8 years awaiting trial and verdict, then two more years after conviction in 2016. In 2018, the verdicts were overturned on appeal. The court ruled that because the Rome Statute, which sets the court's rules, does not limit the amount of time a person can spend in prison awaiting trial, Bemba was not entitled to compensation. It called on member states to urgently review the relevant provisions in the statute. No such review has yet taken place. In 2018, Bemba returned to the Congo where he has since been active in national politics.

== Background ==
Bemba was born in Bokada, Nord-Ubangi. His father, Jeannot Bemba Saolona, was a businessman who was successful under Zairian President Mobutu Sese Seko. His sister, Catherine Bemba, is married to Mobutu's son, Nzanga Mobutu, who was also a candidate in the 2006 presidential election.

Bemba attended boarding school in Brussels and later studied economics at the ICHEC Brussels Management School.

== MLC rebel years ==
The MLC movement started in the Orientale Province of the DRC in 1998 at the beginning of the Second Congo War. Bemba said of its founding: "I had identified the possibility of launching an armed movement. So I went looking for serious partners. There were two countries in the region that were interested but I chose to present my dossier to the Ugandans. They liked it and so I went in." Between October 2002 and February 2003, the MLC had carried out an ethnic cleansing of 40% of pygmies in eastern Congo known as the operation Effacer le tableau.

== Involvement in the Central African Republic ==
In 2002, President Ange-Félix Patassé of the Central African Republic invited the MLC to come to his country and put down a coup attempt. Human rights activists accused MLC fighters of committing atrocities against civilians in the course of this conflict.

== Interim government ==
In 2003, Bemba became one of four vice-presidents during the interim government that lasted from 2003-2006.

== 2006 Presidential election ==
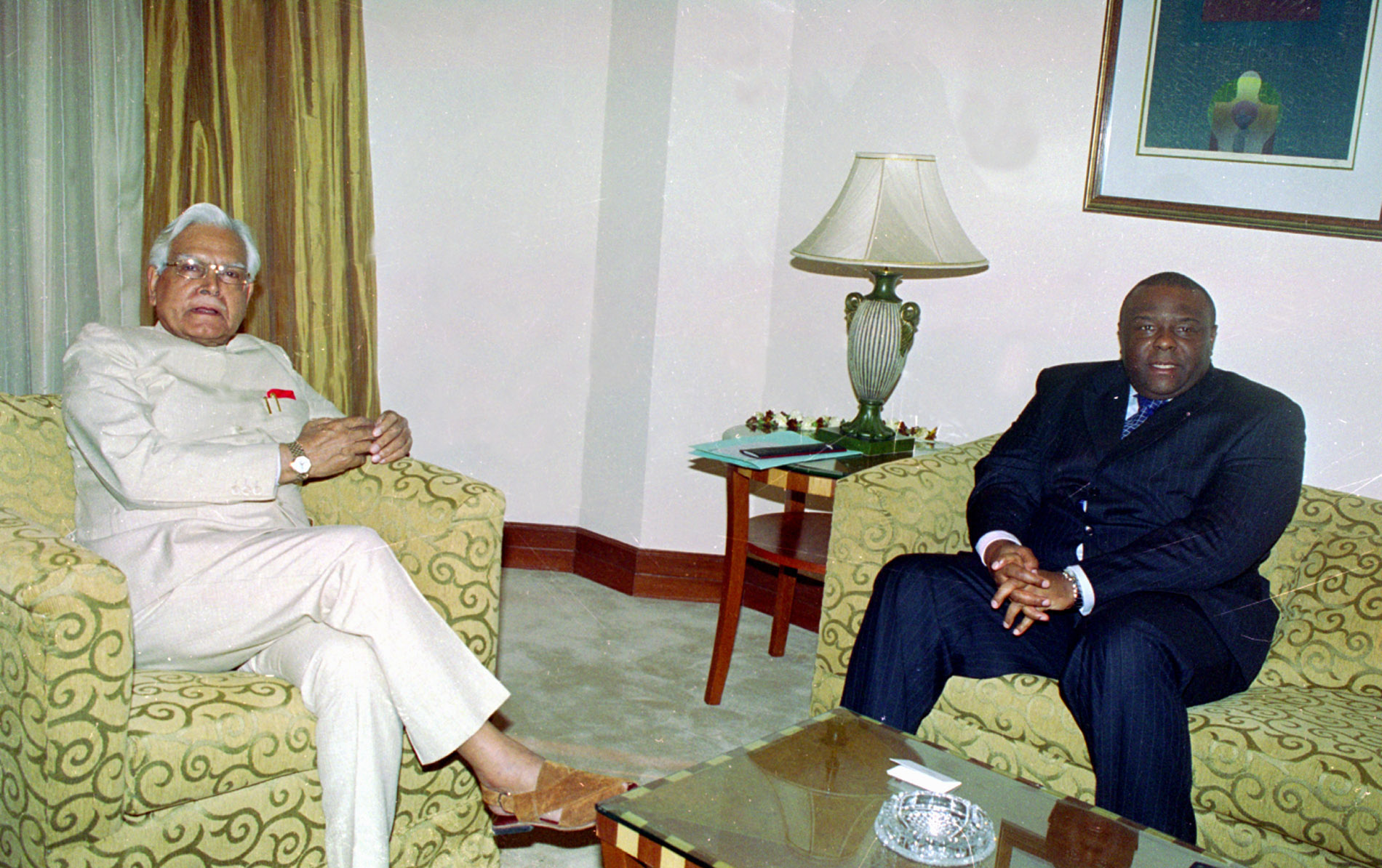
Meeting between Indian Minister of External Affairs Natwar Singh and Bemba in New Delhi on March 3, 2005

Bemba was one of 33 candidates who ran in the Congolese presidential election on July 30, 2006. His main campaign slogan — "One Hundred Percent Congolese" — was widely perceived as an attack on front-runner President Joseph Kabila. Kabila was born in eastern Congo, but spent much of his childhood in exile in Tanzania. Bemba himself has Angolan as well as Congolese ancestry.

Bemba received substantial support in the western, Lingala-speaking portion of the country, including the capital, Kinshasa. Following the vote there was significant tension as to whether Kabila would win a majority of the vote, avoiding a runoff against Bemba, who was perceived as Kabila's main opponent. However, results announced on August 20 gave Kabila 44% of the vote and Bemba 20%,

On August 21, 2006, while accompanied by 14 ambassadors of CIAT members (International Committee in charge of the Transition), including ambassadors from the United States of America, the United Kingdom, France (Bernard Prévost) and Belgium (Johan Swinnen), and from MONUC, US diplomat William L. Swing, Bemba survived an assassination attempt by the Presidential Guard bombing his residence in Gombe. The ambassadors were forced to seek refuge in a cellar.

Kabila and Bemba faced each other in a second round, held on October 29. The electoral commission announced the official results on November 15, naming Kabila the winner with 58.05% of the vote. Bemba's supporters alleged fraud.

On November 27, 2006, the Supreme Court of the DRC rejected the fraud charges brought by Bemba, and confirmed Kabila as the new elected Congolese President. A day later, Bemba said that he disagreed with the court's decision, but that "in the greater national interest and to preserve peace and to save the country from chaos and violence,” he would participate in the system by leading the political opposition. He did not attend Kabila's swearing-in ceremony on December 6. On December 8, the MLC announced that Bemba would run for a Senate seat from Kinshasa in the January 2007 senatorial election, and he succeeded in winning a seat.

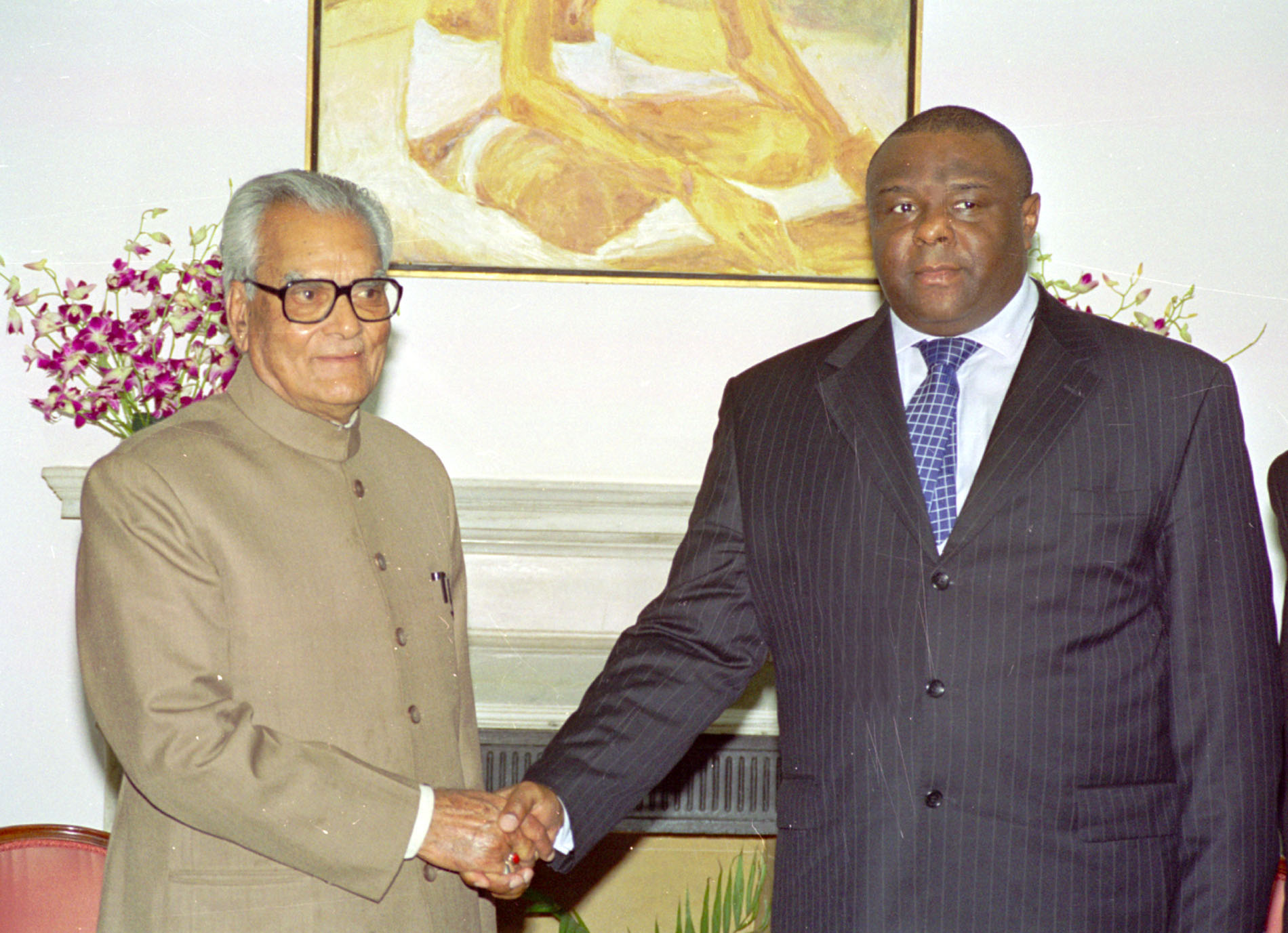
Meeting between Bemba and Indian Vice President Bhairon Singh Shekhawat in New Delhi on 3 March 2005

== March 2007 violence ==
A further attempt on Bemba's life in March 2007 led to an outbreak of fighting near Bemba's residence. A number of soldiers and civilians were reported killed. Bemba called for a ceasefire and negotiations and took refuge in the South African embassy. As fighting continued on March 23, it was announced that a warrant for Bemba's arrest had been issued, accusing him of high treason. Although Bemba enjoyed immunity as a senator, the country's chief prosecutor said that he would ask parliament to remove it.

On March 26, Kabila said that security could not be guaranteed through negotiation and referred to the importance of restoring order. Bemba warned of a potential for dictatorship and foreshadowed his retreat into exile, citing security concerns.

Late in the month it was reported that Bemba planned to travel to Portugal for treatment of a broken leg. He had already received treatment for his leg there in previous months. The Portuguese ambassador subsequently said on March 30 that Bemba was expected to travel to Portugal for treatment, but was not going into exile there. On April 9, the Senate approved the trip for a period of 60 days. On April 11, Bemba left the South African embassy and was taken to the airport by U.N. MONUC forces, then flown out of the country to Portugal, along with his wife and children. On April 12, the attorney general, Tshimanga Mukeba, said that he had asked the Senate to remove Bemba's immunity.

Following the outbreak of violence in March, Bemba's party, the MLC, said that it was being targeted by the government through arrests and intimidation, and that its headquarters was occupied by government forces. On April 13, the party suspended its participation in the National Assembly due to this intimidation and insecurity.

In the first half of June, it was reported that despite the expiration of the 60 days prescribed by the Senate, Bemba would not return to the DRC due to safety concerns. According to MLC executive secretary Thomas Luhaka, Bemba was medically able to return and take part in politics again, and Luhaka called for a political solution to facilitate his return. Without Senate permission to be absent, he would automatically lose his seat if absent from over a quarter of Senate sessions, unless the absences were justified. On June 15, the Senate extended Bemba's permitted absence until July 31, following a request from Bemba in a June 12 letter in asking for more time. In this letter he expressed a readiness to return and take part in politics, but also expressed concerns about his safety.

On July 13, Bemba met with Louis Michel, the European Commissioner for Development & Humanitarian Aid. According to Michel, Bemba "intends to give the presidential majority the benefit of the doubt" and would not do or say anything "that could be taken as an attempt at destabilisation". He did not return by the July 31 deadline, with a spokesman citing continued security concerns; the Senate was then in recess until September 15, and Senate President Kengo wa Dondo said that Bemba would not be penalized for being away during this period because the Senate was not in session. In a statement published on August 1, Bemba said that he wanted to return before September 15.

It was announced on September 7 that Bemba had met with National Assembly President Vital Kamerhe in Portugal to discuss his potential return. In November 2007, he visited Belgium and met with Belgian Foreign Minister Karel De Gucht.

In a March 2008 interview, Bemba said that he was in "forced exile" and that it seemed the government was moving towards a dictatorship.

== Arrest and trial ==
On 24 May 2008, Bemba was arrested near Brussels. He was handed over to the ICC on 3 July 2008 and transferred to its detention centre in the Hague. He was the only person arrested in connection with the ICC's investigation in the Central African Republic. The Supreme Court of the Central African Republic found no basis to pursue cases against Bemba and former CAR President Ange-Félix Patassé.

The trial of Bemba began on 22 November 2010 and lasted four years. The prosecutor was Fatou Bensouda. Two more years passed before the verdict was given.

On 21 March 2016, he was convicted on two counts of crimes against humanity and three counts of war crimes. This marked the first time the International Criminal Court (ICC) convicted someone of sexual violence. The trial evaluated a theory of criminal responsibility related to whether a remote commander who failed to prevent or punish crimes was liable for crimes against humanity and war crimes.

On 21 June 2016, the ICC sentenced Bemba to 18 years in prison for war crimes and crimes against humanity committed by his Congolese Liberation Movement (MLC). In March 2017 he was sentenced to an extra year in prison and fined 300,000 euros ($324,000) by the ICC for interfering with witnesses in his trial.

=== Appeal ===
On 28 September 2016, Bemba served the ICC appeals chamber with an appeal against his 18-year conviction citing numerous procedural and legal errors in the judgment, and alleging a mistrial. The appeal centered on whether Bemba had had a fair trial, with concerns about the need for greater specificity in criminal charges. The conviction was overturned on 8 June 2018 by Judge Christine Van den Wyngaert. She stated that he could not be held responsible for the actions of his men, and that the lower court "ignored significant testimonial evidence that Bemba's ability to investigate and punish crimes in the CAR was limited".

The court ruled that because the Rome Statute, which sets the court's rules, does not limit the amount of time a person can spend in prison awaiting trial, Bemba was not entitled to compensation. It called on member states to review urgently the relevant provisions in the statute No such review had yet taken place.

On May 4, 2017, Bemba filed an additional appeal against his conviction for interfering with witnesses, alleging factual and legal errors on the part of the trial chamber and illegal investigative activity by the ICC Office of the Prosecutor.

== 2018 to present ==
On 1 August 2018, Bemba returned to the DRC after 11 years of exile and imprisonment. He attempted to run for President of the Democratic Republic of the Congo in the 2018 election, and was considered by some to be the strongest opposition candidate. He was barred from running after a review conducted by the country's Independent National Electoral Commission. He joined other opposition leaders in an agreement to support candidate Martin Fayulu, who became the subject of a dispute over the election's results—winning according to journalists analyzing data apparently leaked from the electoral commission and the Catholic Church's observation mission, but losing to Félix Tshisekedi according to the election commission's official results. As of 2023, Bemba was active in national DRC politics. On 23 March 2023, Tshisekedi named Bemba Minister of Defence in a cabinet reshuffle. Following the re-election of President Tshisekedi and his installation of Judith Suminwa Tuluka as Prime Minister, Bemba was named as Transport Minister in 2024, while retaining his portfolio as Deputy Prime Minister.

== See also ==
- Effacer le tableau
