= Rally for Congolese Democracy =

Political party in the Democratic Republic of the Congo

Rally for Congolese Democracy Rassemblement Congolais pour la Démocratie
- President: Azarias Ruberwa
- Founded: August 16th, 1998
- Armed wing: Congolese National Army (ANC) (1998-2003)
- Ideology: Social liberalism
- Political position: Centre
- Seats in the Senate: 7 / 108

The Congolese Rally for Democracy (French: Rassemblement Congolais pour la Démocratie; abbreviated RCD), also known as the Rally for Congolese Democracy, is a political party and former rebel group that operated in the eastern region of the Democratic Republic of the Congo (DRC). It was supported by the government of Rwanda, and was a major armed faction in the Second Congo War (1998-2003). It became a social liberal political party in 2003.

== Development ==
In 1997, Laurent-Désiré Kabila was installed as President of the DRC following the victory by the Alliance of Democratic Forces for the Liberation of Congo (AFDL) in the First Congo War, with heavy support from the governments of Uganda and Rwanda. However, the ethnic tensions in eastern DRC did not disappear and Kabila grew wary of Rwandan influence in his administration.

Thousands of Hutu militants who had taken part in the Rwandan genocide and been forced to flee into the DRC maintained a low intensity war with the invading Rwandan army and their Banyamulenge co-ethnics living in the Congolese provinces of North Kivu and South Kivu. By February 1998, the Kivus were engulfed in ethnic warfare. Banyamulenge AFDL troops based in the town of Bukavu mutinied as tensions increased. The mutiny soured the relationship between Kabila and his Rwandan and Ugandan allies.

In early August 1998, the newly formed RCD led by president Ernest Wamba dia Wamba took Goma and began a campaign against Kabila, marking the beginning of the Second Congo War. The RCD was formed with extensive financial, military and organizational support from Uganda and Rwanda after they grew dissatisfied with the Kabila government in the newly renamed Democratic Republic of the Congo. The core of the RCD was composed of former AFDL members, including many Banyamulenge who already tended to ally themselves with Rwanda against the anti-Tutsi forces in the region.

Nevertheless, the forces of the Kabila government managed to halt the RCD advance with the assistance of outside states such as Angola, Chad and Zimbabwe, marking the onset of a full-scale regional conflict.

The South African Institute of International Affairs reported in 1999 that former FAZ generals Kpama Baramoto Kata and General Nzimbi Ngbale Kongo wa Bassa had been responsible for mobilised 30,000 disillusioned FAC troops, 'garrisoned at Kitona,' to join the rebellion.

During this period, Congolese living in the Kivus increasingly came to view the RCD as a brutal oppressor. Rwanda had nearly complete control of the organization, while the RCD continued to increase taxation with no noticeable improvement in infrastructure or basic services. The RCD's undisciplined troops, along with those of other armed groups, were also responsible for acts of brutality against the population. Kivutians also criticize the dominance of Banyamulenge.

== Stalemate leads to fractures in the RCD ==
In 1999, the battle lines achieved a rough stalemate. At the same time, the character of the RCD changed as former supporters of Mobutu Sese Seko and dissidents from outside the country began to join. Once it became clear that Kabila would not be overthrown, fracture lines began to appear in the organization, and Rwanda and Uganda began to struggle over who would control the RCD, and the RCD's access to natural resources such as diamonds and other valuable minerals.

Tensions came into the open in May 1999 when Wamba dia Wamba left to establish a group in the town of Kisangani with the support of Uganda, apparently over a disagreement with former Mobutu supporter Lunda Bululu. His organization eventually became known as the RCD-Kisangani (RCD-K), or sometimes RCD-Wamba.

Dr. Emile Ilunga took over leadership of the older faction, often referred to as RCD-Goma to distinguish it from the group led by Wamba. Rwanda became the primary supporter of the RCD Goma, thereby transferring the tension between Uganda and Rwanda into their proxy rebel forces.

Things came to a head when the two RCDs and their patrons met in battle in Kisangani, the capital of Orientale Province, where the Ugandan army was defeated. Battles in Kisangani occurred in 1999 and 2000 (the so-called 'Six-Day War'). Wamba retreated to Bunia, where he faced widespread discontent and revolt within his own organization as the Ituri conflict began. Mbusa Nyamwisi rejected Wamba's leadership and took control of northern North Kivu and Ituri with the support of some Ugandan generals. Nyamwisi renamed the RCD-K the RCD-Mouvement de Libération (RCD-Movement for Liberation, RCD-ML). The Rwandan-supported RCD retained control of southern North Kivu, South Kivu, Maniema, north Katanga, eastern Kasai, and Kisangani.

In 2000, Adolphe Onusumba replaced Ilunga as head of the Goma-based RCD. The new RCD leadership's authority was demonstrated after the Kinshasa offensive in November 2000 was defeated at Pweto. This also illustrated that it was unlikely that Kinshasa would be able to retake eastern Congo militarily. Despite attempts to win the hearts and minds of the Kivutians, the continued human rights abuses and bureaucratic ineptitude ruined these efforts.

The Rwandan-backed RCD continued to be the primary Tutsi force aligned with Rwanda and Burundi. Rwanda appeared to decide that maintaining a sphere of influence in the Kivus through proxy forces is in its best interests. This is similar to the policy that Uganda had decided upon several years earlier.

== Other RCD factions ==
- RCD-Authentique (RCD-A)
- RCD-Congo: Faction of RCD-Goma led by Kin-Kiey Mulumba that broke off in June 2002
- RCD-National (RCD-N): Ugandan-backed rebel group led by Roger Lumbala that split from the RCD-K/ML and is now allied with the MLC
- RCD-Originel (RCD-O)

== Peace process and elections ==
The Second Congo War ended in 2003 with an agreement that created a transitional government leading to elections. Azarias Ruberwa became one of four vice-presidents and the main RCD faction held 94 out of 500 seats in the National Assembly.

The general elections in 2006 saw Ruberwa come fourth in the presidential vote, with only 1.7% of the vote. However the RCD gained 15 seats in the new 500-seat Assembly. In the 19 January 2007 Senate elections, the party won seven out of 108 seats.

Nyamwisi's RCD-K-ML renamed itself the Forces for Renewal.

In 2007, Belgian IPIS researchers examined military structures and mining links in Katanga. They found that Nyunzu was one of the territories that was occupied by the RCD during the two Congo wars. Under RCD rule, there were two military zones in Katanga. The first comprised Kalemie, Moba and Manono and fell under the control of the Kalemie brigade. Kongolo, Kabalo, and Nyunzu formed the second and were occupied by the Kongolo brigade. When the Kalemie and Kongolo brigades left for ‘brassage’, the RCD structures were abandoned and all the Katangese territories fell under the command of the regional headquarters in Lubumbashi.

== See also ==
- Effacer le tableau
- Kivu conflict
