= 2007 Democratic Republic of the Congo gubernatorial elections =

Gubernatorial elections were held in the Democratic Republic of the Congo on 27 January 2007 (with 30 January planned as a possible date for a second round, if necessary), though they were originally scheduled for 16 January and 19 January. The governors and vice-governors were chosen through indirect election by the members of the provincial assemblies; the delay was a result of the difficulties in choosing traditional chiefs to fill the places reserved for them in the provincial assemblies. The second round of voting would only have been necessary in those cases where no candidate had received an absolute majority in the first round, which was not the case anywhere. However, voting was rescheduled in Kasai-Occidental and Kasai-Oriental on 10 February to 15 February, because the Union of the Nation candidates were disqualified because they held dual citizenship.

== Governors elected ==
Alliance	Party	Seats	Provinces
Alliance of the Presidential Majority (AMP)	People's Party for Reconstruction and Democracy (PPRD)	7	Bandundu, Kasai-Occidental, Katanga, Kinshasa, Maniema, Orientale, Sud-Kivu
Alliance of the Presidential Majority (AMP)	Independents	2	Bas-Congo, Nord-Kivu
Alliance of the Presidential Majority (AMP)	Forces for Renewal (FR)	1	Kasai-Oriental
Union for the Nation (UN)	Movement for the Liberation of Congo (MLC)	1	Équateur
Total		11	(source1), (source2)

Both of the independents and the RCD governor are allied with Kabila, which means that the opposition managed to attain the post of governor in only one province.

Province	Governor	Vice-Governor	Party	List of governors
Bandundu	Richard Ndambu Wolang	Vicky Mboso Muteba-Dialunda	PPRD (AMP)	List
Bas-Congo	Simon Mbaki Batshia	Deo Gratias Nkusu Kunzi-Bikawa	Independent (AMP)	List
Équateur	José Makila Sumanda	Ronsard Baende Iyetsi	MLC (UN)	List
Kasai-Occidental	Trésor Kapuku Ngoy	Hubert Mbingo N'Vula	PPRD (AMP)	List
Kasai-Oriental	Alphonse Ngoyi Kasanji	Bruno Kazadi Bukasa	Independent (AMP)	List
Katanga	Moïse Katumbi Chapwe	Guilbert-Paul Yav Tshibal	PPRD (AMP)	List
Kinshasa	André Kimbuta Yango	Clément Bafiba Zomba	PPRD (AMP)	List
Maniema	Didier Manara Linga	Mendes Pierre Masudi	PPRD (AMP)	List
North Kivu	Julien Paluku Kahongya	Feller Lutaichirwa Mulwahale	RCD-K-ML (AMP)	List
Orientale	Médard Autsai Asenga	Joseph Bangakya Angaze	PPRD (AMP)	List
South Kivu	Célestin Cibalonza Byaterana	Léon Mumate Nyamatomwa	PPRD (AMP)	List
Ituri Interim Administration	Emmanuel Leku Apuobo {Administrator)	Petronille Vaweka (Chair of the Ituri Interim Assembly)		
		(source)		

== Protests in Bas-Congo ==
In the province of Bas-Congo, the pro-government independent candidate, Simon Mbatshi, won 15 votes against the opposition MLC candidate, Fuka Unzola, who obtained 14 votes. Opposition activists held protests alleging vote-buying and chanting "Congo can't be rebuilt on corruption". Clashes between the police and Bundu dia Kongo, an opposition secessionist religious group, lead to 134 deaths. The results were annulled on 8 February by an appeals court, but its findings were then overturned by the Constitutional Court of the Democratic Republic of the Congo on 17 February 2007.

== See also ==
- List of Provincial Governors of the Democratic Republic of the Congo
