= 2017 Democratic Republic of the Congo gubernatorial elections =

← 2016	26 August 2017 (first round); 29 August 2017 (second round); 21 December 2017 (in three provinces)

11 Provincial Governors from 26
	First party	Second party
Party	People's Party for Reconstruction and Democracy	Independent
Seats won	7	4

Gubernatorial elections took place in 11 out of the 26 provinces of the Democratic Republic of the Congo on 26 August 2017, with a second round held in three provinces on August 29. Elections in three other provinces were not held until 21 December 2017. The elections occurred after several governors had been dismissed. Applications of potential candidates were submitted to the Independent National Electoral Commission from 21 to 25 July 2017, with a period for the review of the applications from 26 to 30 July. On August 2, the list of candidates was published and the following two days were granted for any appeals. More than half of the provinces were won by candidates of the Alliance of the Presidential Majority, though some went to independent opposition candidates.

Governors are elected by provincial assemblies.

== Results by province ==
The results are listed by province.

Province	Governor-elect	Party
Bas-Uele	Anina Makwa Godelieve	Independent
Equateur	Louis Mbonga	Majority
Haut-Katanga	Célestin Pande Kapopo	Majority
Haut-Lomami	Kalenga Mwenzemi Jackson	Majority
Kasaï-Central	Denis Kambayi	Majority
Kwilu	Michel Balabala Kasongo	Independent
Mongala	Bobo Boloko	Majority
Sud-Kivu	Claude Nyamugabo	Majority
Sud-Ubangi	Taila Nage Joachim	Independent
Tshopo	Constant Lomata	Independent
Tshuapa	Boongo Pancrace	Majority
