= Ngoy =

Surname

Ngoy is a surname and given name. Notable people with the surname include:

- Ngoy Bomboko (born 1975), Congolese football player
- Charles Lokoli-Ngoy (born 1997), Australian footballer
- Aimé Ngoy Mukena, Democratic Republic of the Congo politician
- Eugene Kabongo Ngoy (born 1960), Congolese footballer
- Francis Dady Ngoy (born 1990), Congolese footballer
- Julien Ngoy (born 1997), Belgian footballer
- Kisula Ngoy (1940–2018), Congolese politician and doctor
- Krom Ngoy (1865–1936), Khmer poet and a master of Kse diev
- Michaël Ngoy (born 1982), Swiss ice hockey player
- Narcisse Ngoy (born 2004), French basketball player
- Nathan Ngoy, (born 2001), Belgian footballer
- Ted Ngoy (born 1942), Cambodian American owner of doughnut shops in California
- Trésor Kapuku Ngoy, Congolese businessman, politician and Christian minister
- Ngoy Nsumbu (born 1972), Congolese football player
- Ngoy Srin (born 1994), Cambodian footballer

== See also ==
- Ngoy District, a district (muang) of Luang Prabang province in northern Laos
