= List of governors of Kivu =

Belgian Congo provinces in 1933 after Costermansville (Kivu) and Stanleyville (Orientale) had been separated

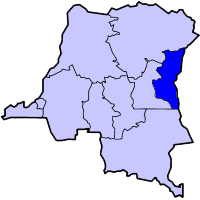
North and South Kivu

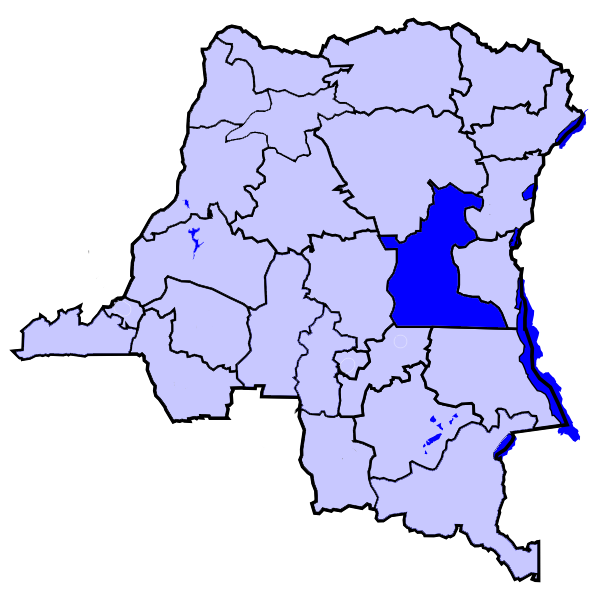
Maniemi

This list of governors of Kivu includes governors or equivalent officer holders of the province in the Belgian Congo created as Costermansville Province in 1933 from part of the old Orientale Province. The province was renamed Kivu Province in 1947. It was broken into the provinces of Maniema, North Kivu and South Kivu from 10 May 1962 to 28 December 1966, then reunited. In 1988 it was again broken up into the provinces of Maniema, North Kivu and South Kivu.

== First period (1933–1962) ==
The province was named Costermansville Province from 1933 to 1947, then Kivu Province The governors or equivalent officer holders were:

Start	End	Officeholder	Title
1933	1935	Georges Mortehan (1883–1955)	Commissioner of Costermansville
1935	1941	Joseph Noirot	Commissioner of Costermansville
1941	1945	Joseph Noirot	Governor of Costermansville
1 July 1946	1951	Antoine Liesnard (1898–1957)	Governor
1951	1956	Joseph-Paul Brasseur (1899–1956)	Governor
1956		Robert Spitaels (b. 1910)	Governor
1956	1957	Georges Schmit (b. 1908)	Governor
1957	1959	Maurice Willaert (1910–2003)	Governor
11 June 1960	24 December 1960	Jean Miruho	President (1st time)
26 June 1960	July 1960	Clément Walubila	President of the secessionist province of Maniema)
2 January 1961	24 February 1961	Anicet Kashamura (b. 1928)	President
1961		Antoine Omari	President of the secessionist State of Maniema)
24 February 1961	11 August 1961	Taris Adrien Omari (b. 1916)	President
18 September 1961	10 May 1962	Jean Miruho	President (2nd time)

== Successor provinces (1962–1966) ==
- List of governors of Maniema
- List of governors of North Kivu
- List of governors of South Kivu

== Second period (1966–1988) ==
The governors or equivalent officer holders were:

Start	End	Officeholder	Title
28 December 1966	3 January 1967	Denis Paluku (1936–2014)	Governor
3 January 1967	9 August 1968	Léon Engulu	Governor
9 August 1968	5 August 1969	Henri-Désiré Takizala (1936–2000)	Governor
5 August 1969	15 January 1970	Barthélemy Mukenge (1925–2018)	Governor
15 January 1970	24 February 1972	Paul Nauwelaerts	Governor
24 February 1972	10 December 1976	Ndebo-a-Kanda-di-Ne Kenza	Commissioner
10 December 1976	21 January 1978	Matabisi Iyualeke Ilande	Commissioner
21 January 1978	18 January 1980	Mulenda Shamuange Muteba	Commissioner
18 January 1980	1986	Mwando Nsimba (1936–2016)	Governor
1986	1988	Kilolo Musamba	Governor

== See also ==
- List of governors of Orientale Province
- Lists of provincial governors of the Democratic Republic of the Congo
