= Masuka =

Masuka is a surname. Notable people with the surname include:

- Anxious Jongwe Masuka
- Dorothy Masuka
- Fifi Masuka Saini
- Vince Masuka

== Other articles ==
- Masuka (crater) - a crater on Mercury
- Masuka (Gitler) - a crater on Germany
