= Velázquez (crater) =

Crater on Mercury

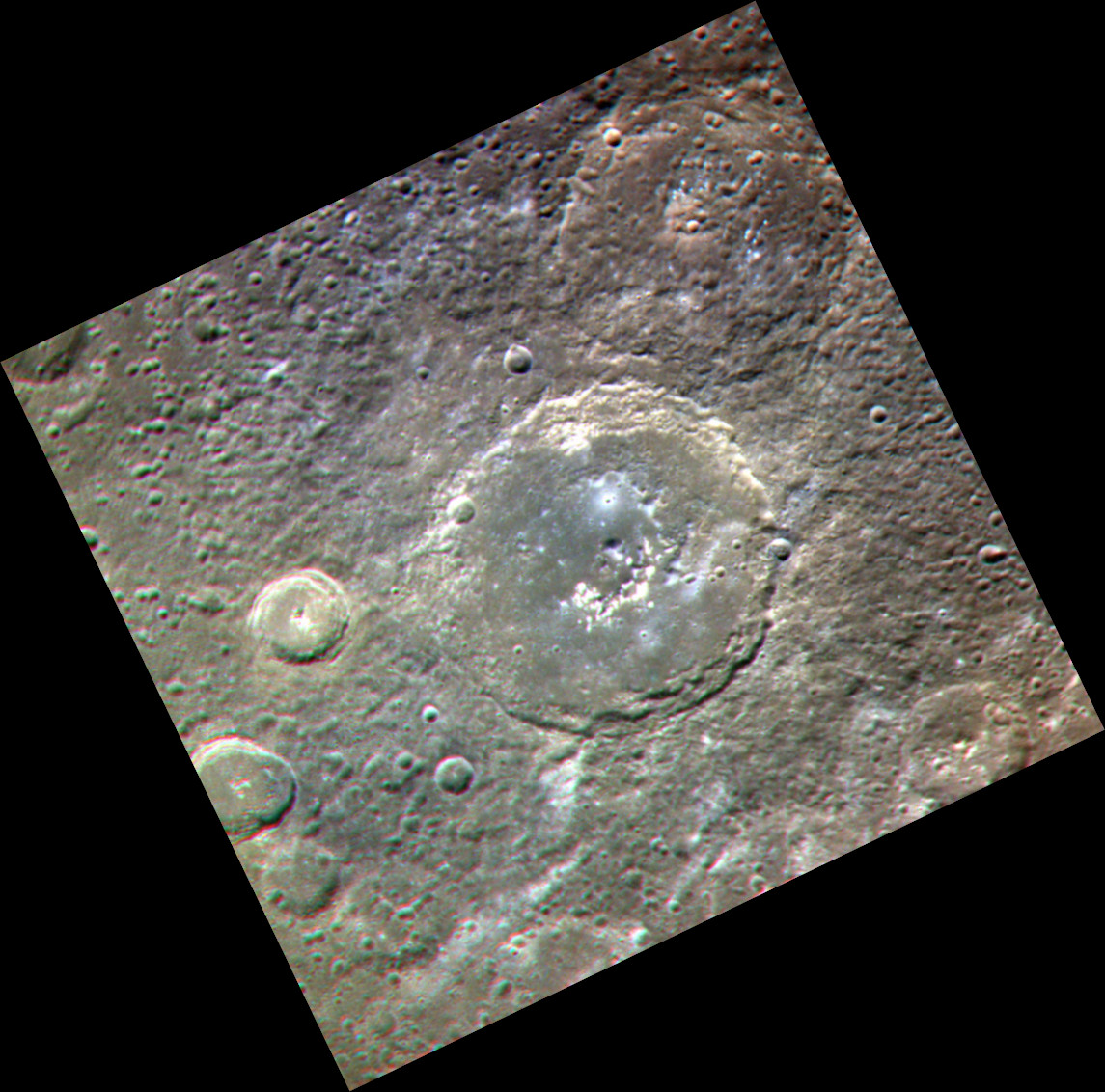
- Exaggerated color MESSENGER WAC image
- Feature type: Impact crater
- Location: Victoria quadrangle, Mercury
- Coordinates: 37.59°N 55.43°W
- Diameter: 128 km (80 mi)
- Eponym: Diego Velázquez

Velázquez is a crater on Mercury. It has a diameter of 128 kilometres (80 miles). Its name was adopted by the International Astronomical Union (IAU) in 1979. Velázquez is named for the Spanish painter Diego Velázquez. The crater was first imaged by Mariner 10 in 1974.

The ancient crater Hugo is east of Velázquez. To the south is Kuan Han-Chʻing, and to the southwest is Jobim.

== Hollows ==
Hollows are present on and around the central peak complex of Velázquez crater. They were well-imaged by MESSENGER.

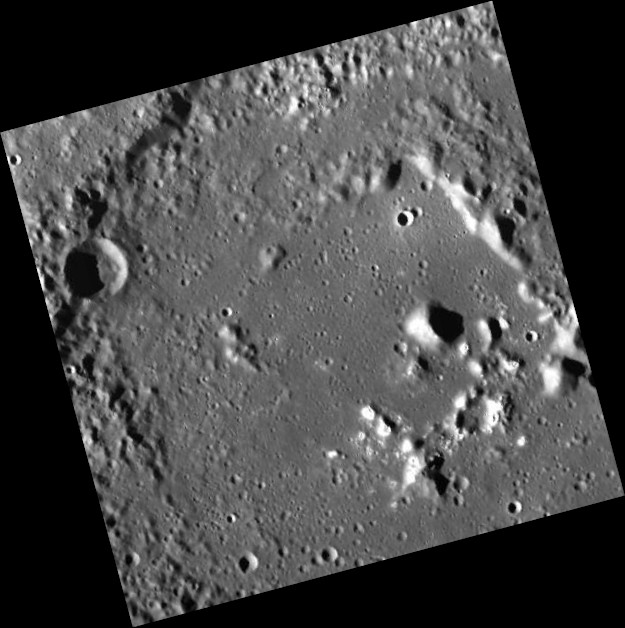
Hollows on and around the central peak complex are visible in lower right.

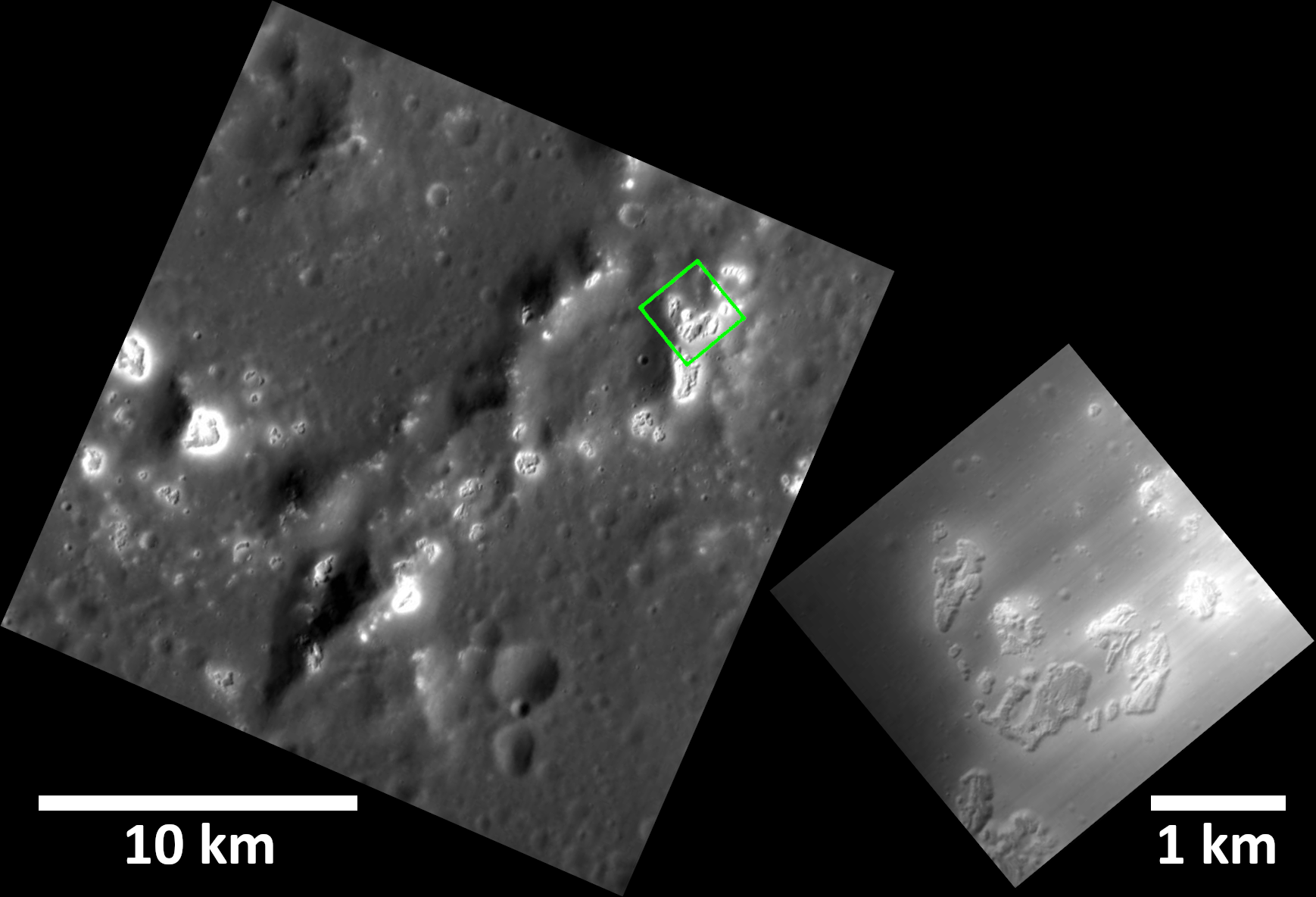
Detail of some of the hollows, including one of the very high-resolution images acquired near the end of the MESSENGER mission when the spacecraft was at a low altitude.

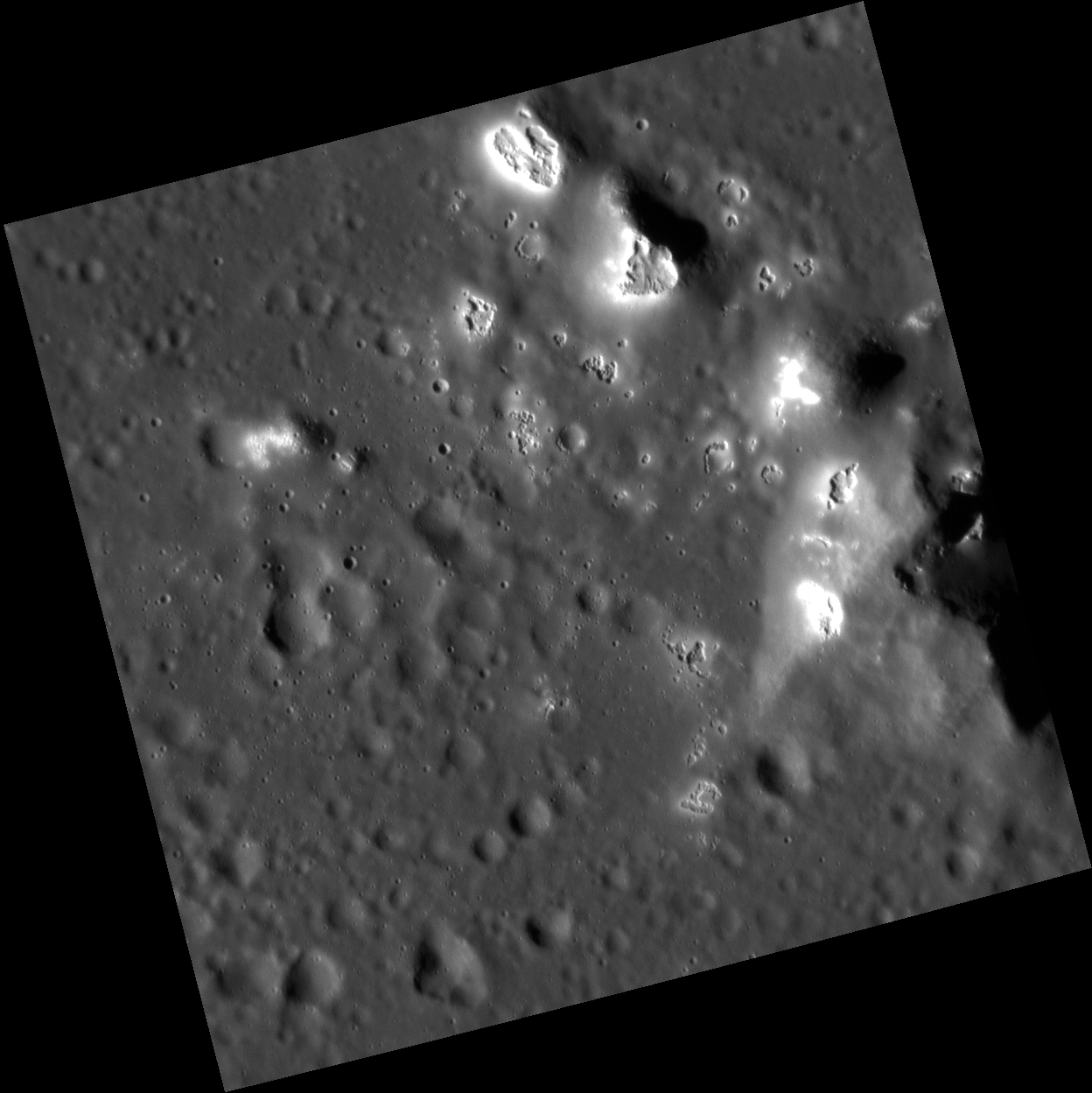
Another view of hollows within the crater
