= Olivier Kamitatu Etsu =

Congolese politician

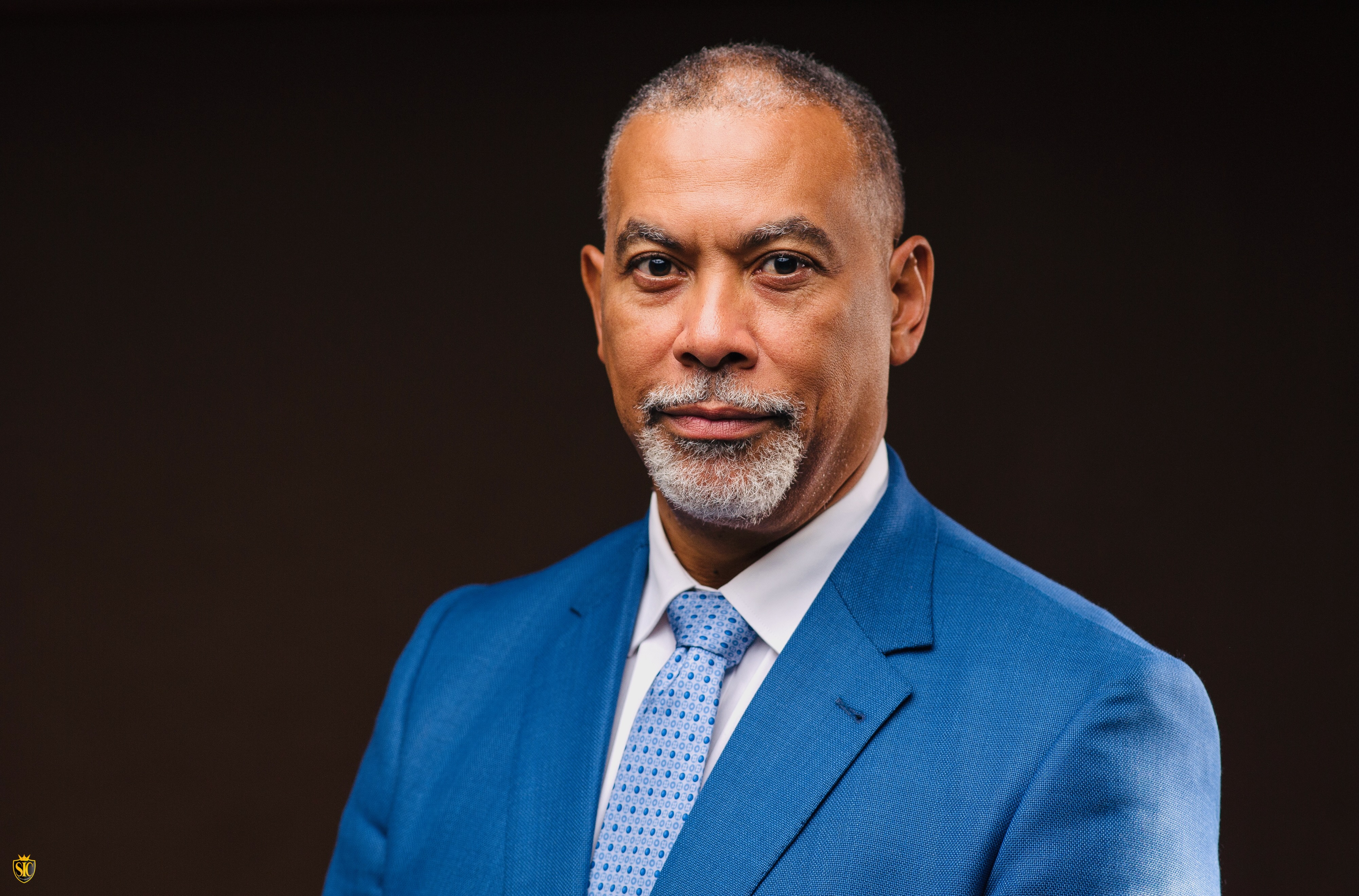
Olivier Kamitatu in 2021

Olivier Kamitatu Etsu (born 17 April 1964 in Brussels) is a politician from the Democratic Republic of the Congo. He served as the president of the Transitional National Assembly from August 2003 to April 2006 and as the Minister of Planning and the Revolution of Modernity from 2007 to 2011 in the Gizenga and Muzito governments, and then in the Matata II government from December 8, 2014, to September 15, 2015. From 2012 to 2017, he was the president of the Africa Liberal Network. He is a member of the Liberal International. After founding in 2006, the Alliance for the Renewal of Congo (ARC), in 2020, he became a founder of the party 'Together for the Republic’ (Ensemble pour la République) of Moïse Katumbi of which he is the spokesperson.

== Career ==
Olivier Kamitatu is the son of Marie-Josée Mafuta Mingi, former Deputy Minister of Education and people's commissioner of Bulungu, and Cléophas Kamitatu Massamba, one of the fathers of Independence, the first Governor of Kinshasa, former Minister of Planning, Interior, and Foreign Affairs from 1960 to 1965, and later of Budget, Finance, Environment, and Agriculture during the 1980s and 1990s, and provincial deputy for the territory of Masi-Manimba in the Bandundu province. He originates from Kwilu, in the Bandundu province.

In 1986, he graduated from the Catholic Institute of Higher Commercial Studies (ICHEC) in Brussels, majoring in economic problems of developing countries.

In 1988, he joined the General Inspectorate of Finances as the Administrative Secretary. He passed the exam and became a Finance Inspector after an internship at the National School of Finance.

In May 1999, he joined the Congolese Liberation Movement (Mouvement de Libération du Congo), the rebellion led by Jean-Pierre Bemba, where he served as Secretary General from 1999 to 2003. In 1999, he led the MLC delegation to the negotiations that resulted in the signing of the ceasefire in July 1999 in Lusaka. From 1999 to 2003, he participated in all peace negotiations in Geneva, New York, Addis Ababa, and Lusaka, which led to the signing of the Global and Inclusive Agreement in Pretoria. He led the movement's delegation at the Inter-Congolese Dialogue in Sun City.

From 2003 to 2006, Olivier Kamitatu was designated by Jean-Pierre Bemba's MLC as the president of the Transitional National Assembly. Under his presidency, the National Assembly drafted the Constitution of the Third Republic, which was promulgated in February 2006 following its adoption by a significant majority of the Congolese population during the referendum held in December 2005.

After leaving the Congolese Liberation Movement in April 2006, he resigned from the presidency of the National Assembly and founded the Alliance for the Renewal of Congo (ARC), which joined the Africa Liberal Network and the Liberal International.

In June 2006, he became the spokesperson for the Alliance of the Presidential Majority (AMP) of President Joseph Kabila. In the 2006 legislative elections, he was elected deputy for the Bulungu constituency. On February 5, 2007, he was appointed Minister of Planning in the Gizenga government, and he retained this position in the Muzito II government. As Minister of Planning, he oversaw the development of the Poverty Reduction Strategy Paper, DSCRP II, along with a Priority Action Plan (PAP) and the Capacity Building Plan, and established the Aid and Investment Management Platform (PGAI). In 2008, he co-chaired Round Table No. 8 on Aid Effectiveness in Accra. He actively participated in the creation of the G7+ group of fragile states. He chaired the informal group G7+. Due to his role as co-chair of Round Table 7 and in 2010, he handed over the role of Chair of G7+ to the minister of Finance of Timor Leste.

In 2011, he retained his seat as deputy for Bulungu. In 2013, he participated in the national consultations. In December 2014, he rejoined the government as Minister of Planning in the Matata II government. On September 14, 2015, he was dismissed from the government following his joining the G7, a platform of seven political parties opposed to the constitutional change advocated by the presidential majority (MP) of President Joseph Kabila.

In 2012, Olivier Kamitatu was elected president of the African Liberal Network for a two-year term, which is renewable once. In 2018, he was elected as one of the non executive vice-presidents of the Liberal International. In 2022, he was appointed as an advisor for Africa to the Bureau of the Liberal International.

In 2020, he founded the party Together for the Republic, led by Moïse Katumbi. He serves as the chief of staff and spokesperson for Katumbi.

== Personal life ==
Olivier Kamitatu is the son of Marie-Josée Mafuta Mingi, former Deputy Minister of Education and people's commissioner (deputy) of Bulungu, and Cléophas Kamitatu, one of the fathers of Independence, the first Governor of Kinshasa, former Minister of Planning, Interior, and Foreign Affairs from 1960 to 1965, and later of Budget, Finance, Environment, and Agriculture during the 1980s and 1990s, and provincial deputy for the territory of Masi-Manimba in the Bandundu province.

== See also ==
- Antipas Mbusa Nyamwisi
- José Endundo Bononge
- Alexis Thambwe Mwamba
