= UNILU =

UNILU may refer to:

- University of Lubumbashi, a university located in Lubumbashi in the Democratic Republic of the Congo
- University of Lucerne, a public university in Lucerne, Switzerland
- University of Luxembourg, a public research university in Luxembourg City, Luxembourg
