= Faïda Mwangilwa =

Fabiola Faïda Mwangilwa is a politician and women's rights activist in the Democratic Republic of the Congo. She is a former Minister of Family and Women's Affairs, and a founding member of several women's organizations and platforms.

== Life ==
Faïda Mwangilwa studied at the University of Kisangani, gaining a degree in Educational Sciences in 1994. In January 1995 she joined the office of the Governor of North Kivu, and worked there until October 2000. She coordinated the repatriation of Rwandan refugees, in partnership with the United Nations High Commissioner for Refugees.

A member of the Rally for Congolese Democracy (RDC), she participated in the 2002 peace talks leading to the Global and All-Inclusive Agreement in December 2002. On 30 June 2003 Mwangilwa was named as Minister for Family and Women's Affairs in the Transitional Government of the Democratic Republic of the Congo. In January 2007 she stood unsuccessfully as a RDC candidate to be a member of the Senate for North Kivu.

In 2012 she founded the Gender, Citizen Participation and Development Consultation Office (Bureau de consultation en genre, participation citoyenne et développement), which she leads. She also founded the Permanent framework for consultation of Congolese women (Cadre permanent de concertation de la femme congolaise, CAFCO).

In January 2021 Mwangilwa was appointed a special advisor to UN Women in the Republic of Mali. In February 2021 she criticized the absence of women in DRC political institutions, and warned against a government which did not include women. She called on the DRC's president, Félix Antoine Tshisekedi, to give particular attention to violence against women during his term in office.

Mwangilwa is a member of the network of African women parliamentarians. She was also Chairman of the Board of Directors of the Congolese Women's Fund (FFC), a grassroots women's development organization.
