= University of Kananga =

University in the DRC

Coordinates: 5°54′37″S 22°29′22″E

- Université de Kananga
- Motto: Scientia Splendet et Conscientia
- Type: Public university
- Active: 2000–2007
- Founders: Prof. MULOWAYI DIBAYA
- Rector: Prof. Emery Tshisanda (since 2022)
- Students: 2047 (2017-2018)
- Location: Kananga, Democratic Republic of the Congo
- Campus: Katambayi Hill
- Language: French
- Website: www.unikan.org

The University of Kananga (UNIKAN) is a public university in the Democratic Republic of the Congo, located in the province of Kasaï Central, in the city of Kananga. The University of Kananga follows the LMD system.

Initially an extension of the University of Lubumbashi, it was known as the "University Center of Kananga (C.U.K.)" at its inception. The language of instruction is French.

In 2007, the University Center of Kananga gained autonomy and was officially renamed "UNIKAN". It is the only official university in the province and collaborates closely with Université Notre-Dame du Kasai (U.K.A), an accredited Catholic university.

== Organization ==
Since 2016, the University of Kananga has been managed by its second management committee appointed by the Minister of Higher Education. Key members include:

- Rector: Prof. Bemis Bushabu
- Academic Secretary: Prof. Mufuayi Gustave
- Administrator: Prof. Loko Nfaba
- Budget Administrator: Ct Jacques Ntumba

Since 2016, the University of Kananga operates from its own facilities located in the Nganza commune, Katambayi chiefdom, and Ntambue-Saint-Bernard.

== Faculties ==
- Faculty of Computer Science
- Faculty of Agronomy and Management
- Faculty of Law
- Faculty of Medicine and School of Public Health
- Faculty of Social, Political, and Administrative Sciences
- Faculty of Economics and Management
- Faculty of Public Health

For the academic year 2018–2019, the General Student Delegation is led by Mr. Muepu Ngalamulume Bofiface, with each faculty represented by a faculty delegate, such as Mr. Kalukanda Mbumba Simon in the Faculty of Computer Science. Some network equipment (fiber optics, routers, etc.) has been provided by a former student of the university, Ir. Albert Sakaji Simba, since 2019, aiming to enhance practical learning opportunities for students in the Computer Science department.
