= Jean Miruho =

President of Kivu Province
- In office 30 June 1960 – 25 December 1960
- Succeeded by: Anicet Kashamura
- In office August 1961 – May 1962

Personal details
- Born: Kabare, Belgian Congo
- Political party: Centre du Regroupement Africain; Mouvement Populaire de la Révolution

Jean Miruho was a Congolese politician who served as President of Kivu Province.

== Biography ==
Jean Miruho was born in Kabare, Belgian Congo. He was a Catholic and worked as a cashier at the Banque du Congo Belge. He was a member of the Centre du Regroupement Africain (CEREA), a political party based in Kivu Province, and organised a chapter of the organisation in Goma and the surrounding area. The party later divided and he became leader of a moderate splinter faction based in North Kivu. In January 1960 he assisted an association of Baptist Congolese in their unsuccessful attempt to gain official recognition from the Belgian colonial authorities. In the May 1960 elections Miruho won a seat in the Kivu Provincial Assembly, representing the Kabare constituency. His CEREA faction secured an additional number of seats in the assembly, and he subsequently organised a coalition with independents and smaller parties. The assembly then elected him President of Kivu Province. His government was formed on 30 June. Upon assuming office, Miruho encouraged the local population to welcome and co-operate with the Europeans residing in the region "on the condition that they do not get involved in politics".

On 5 July 1960 men of the Force Publique in Léopoldville and Thysville mutinied against their Belgian officers. Unrest spread throughout the Lower Congo, and European civilians began to flee the country en masse. In an attempt to resolve the situation, the Congolese government under Prime Minister Patrice Lumumba announced that the Force Publique officer corps was to be Africanised. Miruho co-ordinated well with the Belgian officers in Kivu, ensuring that they handed over power to the Congolese soldiers without incident. The large departure of Europeans deprived Kivu's administration of essential personnel, and Miruho attempted to fill vacant leadership positions according to the seniority and competence of those considered for promotions. On 13 July Lumumba announced that Miruho's appointments would be nullified, generating hostility between the provincial government and the central government. (Note: Historian Jean Omasombo Tshonda noted that by not filling the local administration's vacancies according to civil servants' political affiliation, Miruho had left singular political parties, at a disadvantage.)

The political situation continued to deteriorate over the following months. Katanga Province seceded from the Congo and Lumumba was removed from power. By November Lumumba's supporters had begun consolidating their position in Orientale Province and sparring with the central government in Léopoldville. Miruho's government distanced itself from both factions while also refusing to lead its province into secession.

Lumumba's supporters in Orientale shortly thereafter assumed local control and openly challenged the authority of the central government. On 24 December, troops from Orientale occupied Bukavu, the capital of Kivu, and arrested the local army commander. The next day Miruho tried to intervene and secure his release, but he too was arrested by the soldiers and sent to Stanleyville along with the Bukavu army commander. Anicet Kashamura was installed as his replacement. Despite rumours of abuse and torture, Miruho was not mistreated while in their custody. In January 1961 Lumumba was killed, and ethnic tensions dramatically rose throughout Kivu in February, paralysing Adrien Omari's government and facilitating Miruho's return to power when Cyrille Adoula became Prime Minister in August. Nevertheless, his new government was threatened by rebellious troops and had to remain under the constant protection of peacekeeping units of the United Nations Operation in the Congo. At his request, the troublesome officers and units were transferred out of the province in December. Miruho remained in power until May 1962, when the central government suspended the powers of the provincial authorities and assumed direct control over Kivu. In September Miruho published a letter to Adoula, demanding that he respect the authority of the provincial government. In response, Adoula's government placed Miruho and his family under house arrest and subsequently accused him of planning to ally Kivu with Katanga's secession. Miruho was opposed to Kivu's division into smaller provinces.

On 5 July 1968, President Joseph-Désiré Mobutu announced Miruho's appointment to the Political Bureau of the Mouvement Populaire de la Révolution, the state political party.
