= Hugo (crater) =

Crater on Mercury

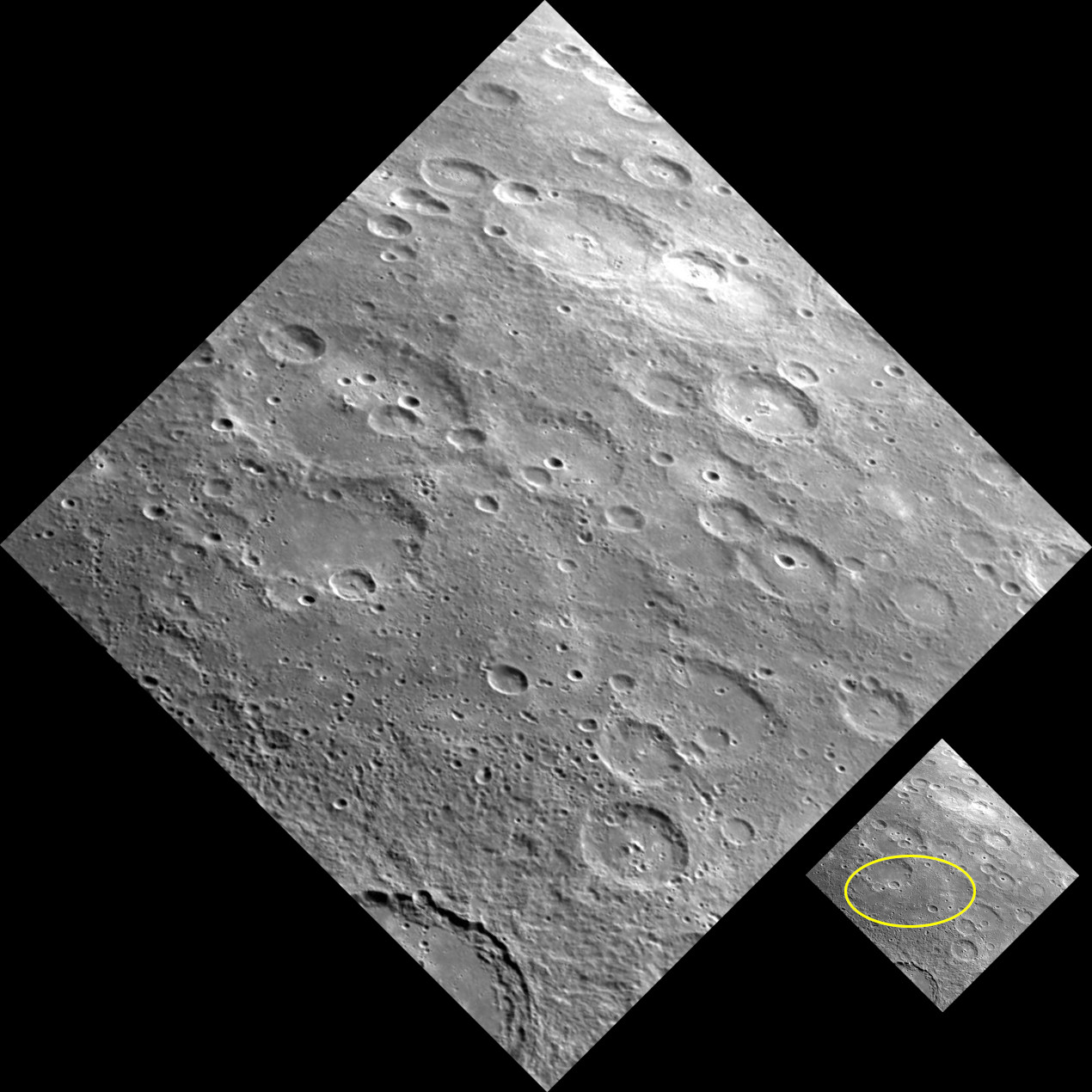
- Oblique MESSENGER WAC image of Hugo
- Feature type: Impact crater
- Location: Victoria quadrangle, Mercury
- Coordinates: 39.61°N 48.49°W
- Diameter: 206 km (128 mi)
- Eponym: Victor Hugo

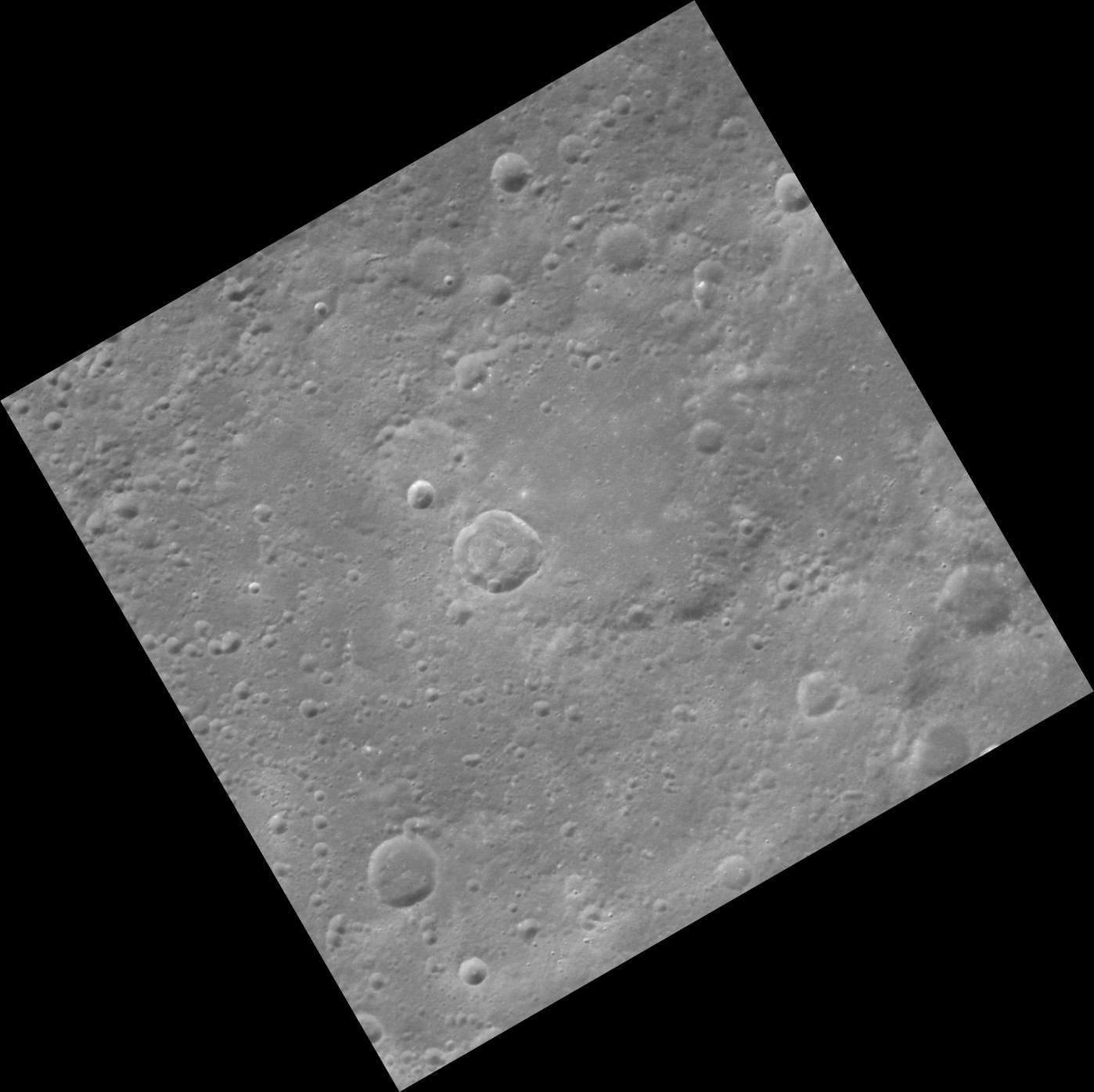
Northern Hugo crater. The rim arcs from near the left corner to above center and to near the right corner.

Hugo is a crater on Mercury. Its name was adopted by the International Astronomical Union in 1979. Hugo is named for the French writer Victor Hugo, who lived from 1802 to 1885. The crater was first imaged by Mariner 10 in 1974.

The crater is highly eroded and difficult to distinguish.

To the west of Hugo is Velázquez crater. To the east are Sōseki and Plath.
