= Provincial Assembly of South Kivu =

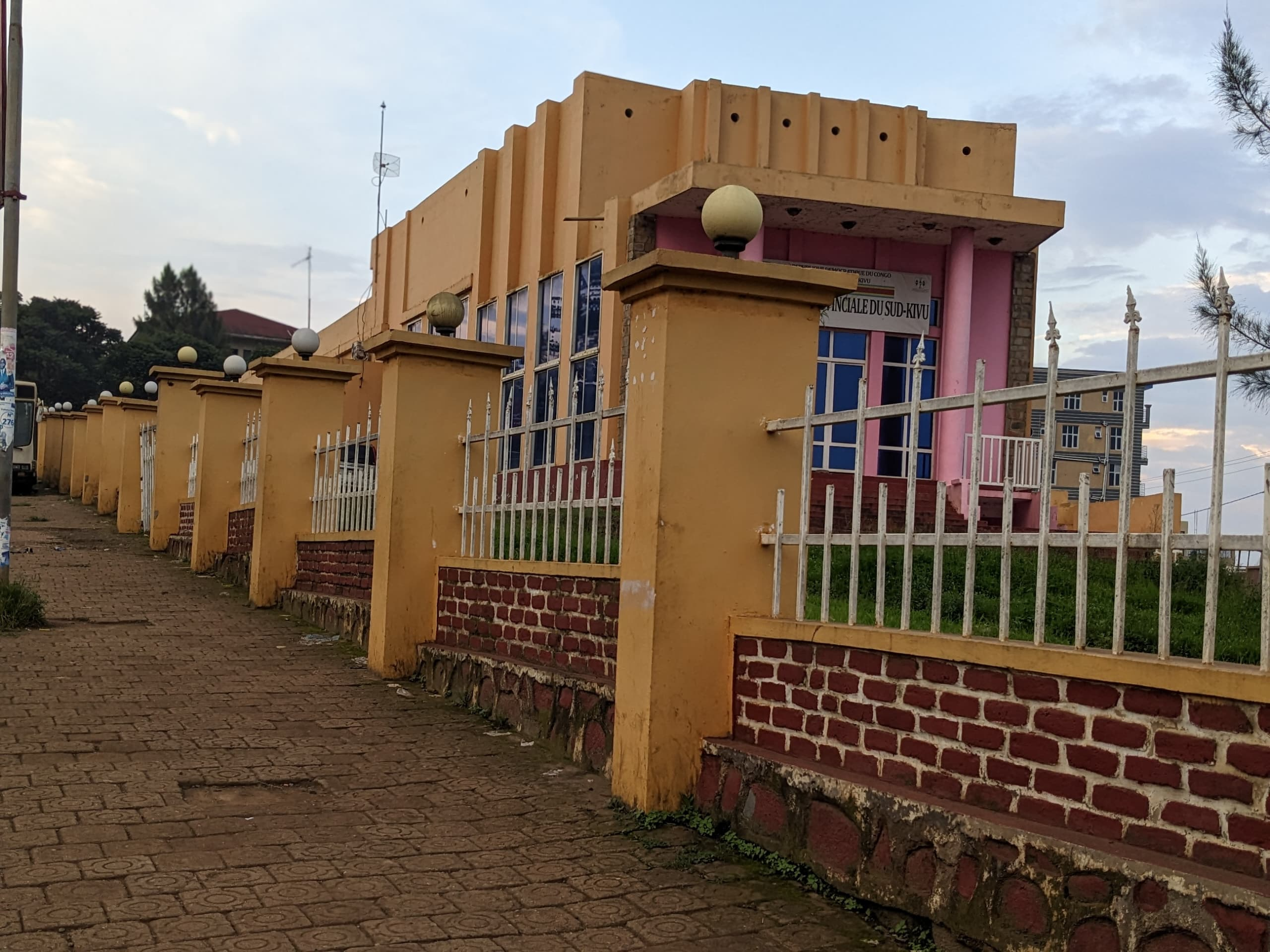
Provincial Assembly of South Kivu

The Provincial Assembly of South Kivu (French: L'assemblée Provinciale du Sud Kivu) is the provincial assembly of South Kivu province, Democratic Republic of the Congo. It has the power to vote for the governor; it can also vote to impeach or suspend the governor.
