= Gertrude Kitembo =

Gertrude Kitembo Mpala (born 1958) is a politician and businesswoman in the Democratic Republic of the Congo. She is a former Minister of Posts and Telecommunications.

== Life ==
Gertrude Kitembo was born in March 1958. She was a senior member of the former rebel faction RCD-Goma, becoming head of RCD-Goma's internal administration department.

From May 2000 to March 2001 she was governor of Maniema.

On 30 June 2003 Kitembo was named as Minister of Posts and Telecommunications in the Transitional Government of the Democratic Republic of the Congo.

A 2002-3 United Nations panel investigating into the exploitation of mineral resources in DRC recommended financial sanctions against a company that Kitembo set up, the Congo Holding Development Company, a mining and trading firm based near the Rwandan border in Goma. The panel's confidential report to the UN security council claimed that the company was selling minerals to fund arms for the Congolese National Army (ANC), the military wing of RCD-Goma.

Kitembo is president of the Congo of Values (CV) party, a member of the political group Alliance for the Integral Transformation of Congo (ATIC). In March 2019 she became President of the Provincial Assembly of Maniema.
