= Célestin Cibalonza Byaterana =

Democratic Republic of the Congo politician

Célestin Cibalonza Byaterana (born 1964) is the former governor of Sud-Kivu province. He was elected to the post by the Sud-Kivu provincial assembly in the 2007 gubernatorial elections. He appointed Léon Mumate Nyamatomwa as his vice-governor, but when Nyamatomwa died in Kinshasa on May 11, 2007 the provincial assembly elected Bernard Watunakanza Banamwezi to succeed Nyamatomwa as vice-governor.

On November 14, 2007 the provincial assembly voted (24-11) to suspend Byaterana, but he then appealed the decision to the Supreme Court. Although the Supreme court later ruled in his favor, he resigned and new elections were held in March 2008 which led to Louis Leonce Muderwa being named as the new governor.
