= List of governors of South Kivu =

South Kivu

This list of governors of South Kivu includes governors or equivalent officerholders of the South Kivu province of the Democratic Republic of the Congo, created in 1989 when the former Kivu Province was divided into South Kivu, North Kivu and Maniema. It also includes a list of governors of the earlier province named Kivu Central, then Sud-Kivu, between 1963 and 1966.

== Kivu Central (1963–1966) ==
The province of Kivu Central (the present South Kivu) was created on 18 May 1963 out of part of the former Kivu province. The province of Sud-Kivu was formed on 25 April 1966 when the provinces of Kivu Central and Maniema were united. On 28 December 1966 Sud-Kivu became part of the restored Kivu province.

Province	Start	End	Officeholder	Title
Kivu Central	16 July 1963	July 1964	Simon Malago	President
Kivu Central	August 1964	25 April 1966	Dieudonné Boji	President, then from 1965 governor
Sud-Kivu	25 April 1966	28 December 1966	Dieudonné Boji	Governor

== Second period (1988 – present) ==
The governors were:

Start	End	Officeholder	Notes
20 July 1988	1990	Ndala Kasala	
1990	November 1991	Dilingi Liwoke La Milengo	
December 1991	October 1996	Kyembwa wa Lumona	
October 1996	June 1997	Anatole Bishikwabo Chubaka	
June 1997	October 1998	Jean-Charles Magabe (d. 1999)	
October 1998	10 June 2002	Norbert Basengezi Katintima	in rebellion
May 2002		Musamba Mondero	
10 June 2002	26 January 2003	Patient Mwendanga	in rebellion
26 January 2003	26 May 2004	Xavier Ciribanya Cirimwami	suspended from 7 Feb 2004, in rebellion
October 2003		Fumi Tambwe	
7 February 2004	26 May 2004	Jean-Pierre Mazambi	interim
26 May 2004	10 November 2005	Augustin Bulaimu	suspended from 25 Apr 2005
25 April 2005	10 November 2005	Alimasi Ndomba Pauni	interim
10 November 2005	24 February 2007	Bu Amba Amba Déogracias	
24 February 2007	21 March 2008	Célestin Cibalonza Byaterana (b. 1964)	
November 2007	21 March 2008	Bernard Watunakanza	acting
21 Mar 2008	19 April 2010	Louis Léonce Muderhwa (1963–2023)	
19 April 2010	12 July 2010	Jean-Claude Kibala (acting) (b. 1965)	
12 July 2010	July 2017	Marcellin Cishambo (b. 1956)	
July 2017	October 2017	Gabriel Kalonda Mbulu (acting) (b. 1963)	
October 2017	March 2019	Claude Nyamugabo Bazibuhe (b. 1972)	
March 2019	9 May 2019	Adolphe Bizimungu Doly	acting
9 May 2019		Théo Ngwabidje Kasi (b. 1971)	

== See also ==
- List of governors of Kivu
- Lists of provincial governors of the Democratic Republic of the Congo
