= Richard Muyej =

Congolese politician (born 1954)

Governor of Lualaba Province
- In office 26 March 2016 – 10 January 2023
- Succeeded by: Fifi Masuka Saini

Minister of the Interior, Security, Decentralization, and Customary Affairs
- In office April 2012 – December 2014
- President: Joseph Kabila
- Prime Minister: Augustin Matata Ponyo

Minister of Relations with Parliament
- In office February 2010 – March 2012
- President: Joseph Kabila
- Prime Minister: Adolphe Muzito

Personal details
- Born: 31 December 1954 (age 71) Élisabethville, Belgian Congo
- Children: 6
- Education: National Pedagogical Institute

Richard Muyej Mangeze Mans (born 31 December 1954) is a Congolese politician who served as governor of Lualaba Province from 2016 to 2023. Born in Élisabethville (now Lubumbashi), he obtained his Bachelor's degree in history in 1979. He was elected as a member of the National Assembly in 2006, representing the riding of Lubumbashi. He was appointed by then-president Joseph Kabila as Minister of Relations with Parliament in 2010, before becoming Minister of the Interior, Security, Decentralization, and Customary Affairs in 2012. He was elected governor of Lualaba Province in 2016. He left for South Africa for medical treatment in January 2021, leaving his vice-governor Fifi Masuka Saini as acting governor. The provincial assembly of Lualaba impeached Muyej on 10 September 2021, and he announced his resignation as governor on 10 January 2023.

== Early life and career ==
Richard Muyej Mangeze Mans was born on 31 December 1954 in Élisabethville (now Lubumbashi), Belgian Congo. He was educated in Catholic schools within Katuba commune and the Saint Jérôme Institute in Lubumbashi. In 1979, he obtained his Bachelor's degree in history at the National Pedagogical Institute in Kinshasa. He worked as a professor and a director of studies from 1980 to 1993. From 1994, he became general manager of Hotel Karavia in Lubumbashi, a director representing Sodimico, and chief executive officer of Kisenge Manganese. He then became a member of the board of directors of Gécamines, then OFIDA, until 2009.

== Political career ==
Muyej was a member of the Union of Federalists and Independent Republicans (UFERI) provincial council in Katanga Province from 1990 to 1997. He was a founding member of the People's Party for Reconstruction and Democracy (PPRD) in 2002 and served as the party's provincial president in Katanga until 2007. He ran as a PPRD candidate for the riding of Lubumbashi in the 2006 general election and was elected to the National Assembly.

In January 2010, then-president Joseph Kabila appointed Muyej as Minister of Relations with Parliament. In April 2012, he was appointed Minister of the Interior, Security, Decentralization and Customary Affairs. He left the government at the reshuffle of the 7 December 2014.

Muyej was elected governor of Lualaba Province with Fifi Masuka Saini as vice-governor in the 2016 gubernatorial elections. He left for South Africa to seek medical care on 10 January 2021, leaving Masuka as acting governor. 11 out of 17 members of the Lualaba provincial assembly voted to impeach Muyej on 10 September 2021 after he was accused of embezzling US$366 million in funds meant for an agricultural project. On 10 January 2023, Muyej announced his resignation as governor.

== Personal life ==
He is married. He has six children: two daughters and four sons.
