= 2016 Democratic Republic of the Congo gubernatorial elections =

- 26 March 2016

20 of the 26 Provincial Governors
| | First party | Second party |
|---|---|---|
| Party | People's Party for Reconstruction and Democracy | Independent |
| Seats won | 15 | 5 |

Gubernatorial elections took place in 20 out of the 21 new provinces of the Democratic Republic of the Congo on 26 March 2016 (in Sud-Ubangi the election did not occur until April 1, while in Nord-Ubangi a second round had to be held as no candidate received the majority). The elections were the first to take place since the 2015 repartitioning which saw the 6 largest provinces of 11 split into 21 new ones to form in total the 26 provinces mandated by the DRC constitution. In most of the provinces, the elected governors are members or affiliates of the Alliance of the Presidential Majority.

Initially, the Constitutional Court ruled that President Joseph Kabila could appointed interim governors. They went on to organize elections in their regions. The Congolese opposition largely boycotted the elections or were excluded from them.

Governors are elected by provincial assemblies.

== Results by province ==
List of the governors-elect by province.

| Province | Governor-elect | Party |
|---|---|---|
| Bas-Uele | Borrey Armand Kasubu Mbaya | Independent |
| Equateur | Tony Cassius Bolamba | Independent |
| Haut-Katanga | Jean-Claude Kazembe Musonda | Majority |
| Haut-Lomami | Célestin Mbuyu Kabango | Majority |
| Haut-Uele | Jean-Pierre Lola Kisanga | Independent |
| Ituri | Mbaka Jefferson Abdallah Pene | Majority |
| Kasaï | Marc Manyanga Ndambo | Majority |
| Kasaï-Central | Alex Kande Mupompa | Independent |
| Kasaï-Oriental | Alphonse Ngoy Kasanji | Majority |
| Kwango | Kabula Mavula Larousse | Majority |
| Kwilu | Lumuna Godel Kinyoka Kaba | Majority |
| Lomami | Muteba Patrice Kamanda Tshibangu | Majority |
| Lualaba | Richard Muyej | Majority |
| Mai-Ndombe | Gentiny Ngobila Mbaka | Majority |
| Mongala | Bolea Bienvenu Essimba Baluwa | Independent |
| Nord-Ubangi | Marie-Thérèse Gerengbo | Majority |
| Sankuru | Lukata Ulungu Ekunda | Majority |
| Tanganyika | Richard Ngoy Kitangala | Majority |
| Tshopo | Jean Ilongo Tokole | Majority |
| Tshuapa | Cypien Lomboto Lombonge | Majority |
