= Julien Paluku Kahongya =

Congolese politician

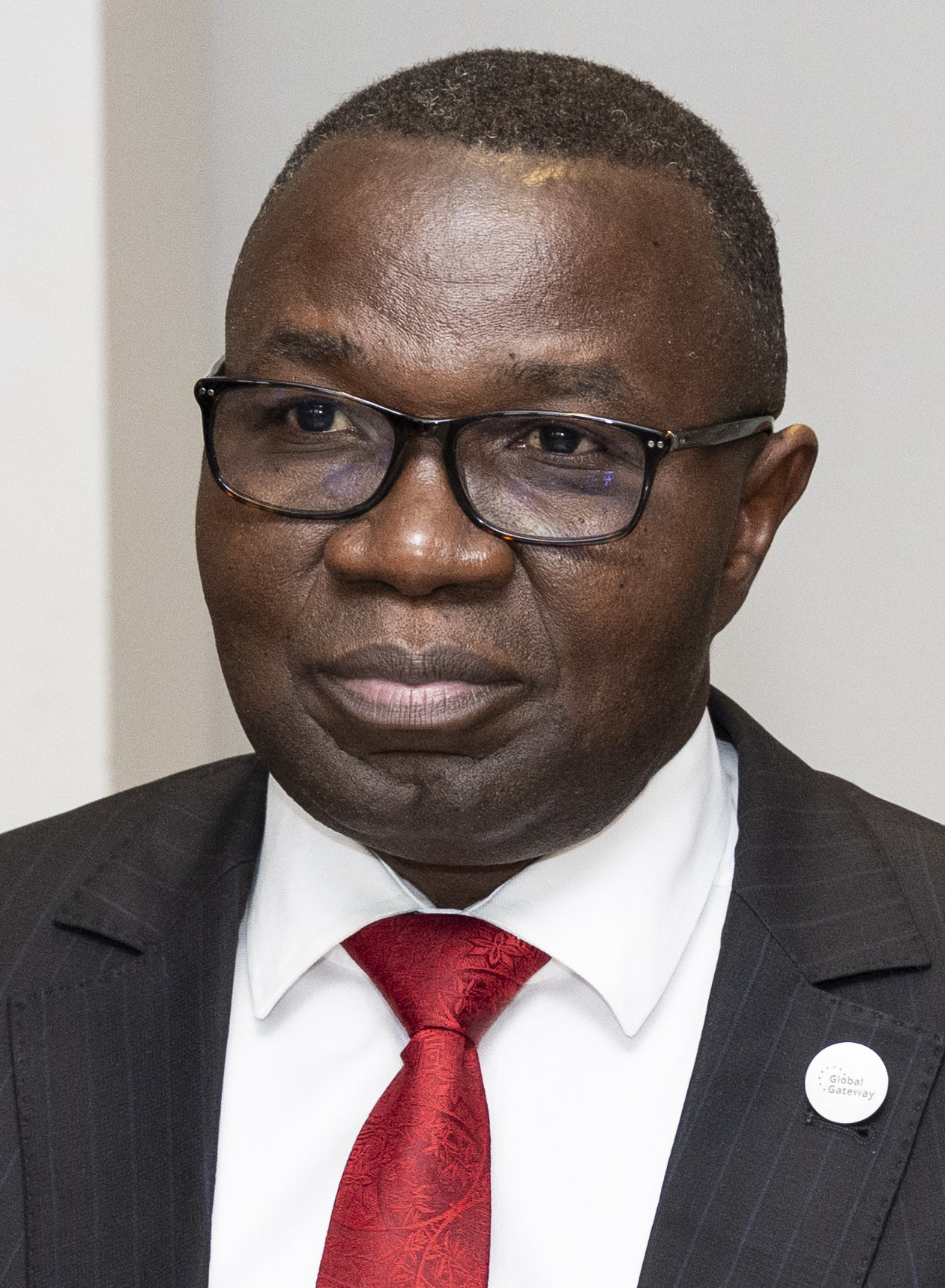
- Julien Paluku Kahongya in 2025

Governor of North Kivu
- In office 27 January 2007 – 22 February 2019
- President: Joseph Kabila
- Preceded by: Eugène Serufuli Ngayabaseka
- Succeeded by: Feller Lutaichirwa Mulwahale (Acting)

Personal details
- Born: 13 December 1968 (age 57)
- Party: Union pour la Démocratie et le Progrès Social (formerly)
- Education: College of Rural Development; Free University of the Great Lake Region
- Website: http://www.julienpaluku.com/

Julien Paluku Kahongya (born 13 December 1968) is a Congolese politician. He served as the governor of the province of North Kivu from 27 January 2007 to 22 February 2019. On June 21, 2023, he founded the political grouping Alliance bloc 50 (A/B50). Named after the Boeing B-50 Superfortress, the A/B50 wants to "bomb" poverty, corruption, bad governance, and everything that hinders the development of the DRC. The group also advocates for a strong, prosperous, and united Congo, as well as the implementation of decentralization, which it believes heralds development from the ground up. At its founding, the group included eight parties.

== Early life ==
Paluku's father, Paluku Kyavuyirwe, was born in the territory of Lubero. Paluku attended primary school at Nyamitwitwi (Rutshuru) and high school at Nyamilima (Rutshuru). He graduated from the College of Rural Development in Bukavu in 1993 and obtained a master's degree in Community Health at the Free University of the Great Lake Region, Campus of Butembo in 2005.

He taught at Nyamilima from 1988 to 1989 and in Goma from 1994 to 1998. He is a former member of the Union pour la Démocratie et le Progrès Social.

== Career ==
In 1996, when AFDL entered Goma on Friday 1 November, Paluku was a teacher at Mikeno College. At "Liberation", he attended a training seminar on the management of the country. He then participated in the second year of military training at the training center of Rumangabo.

After this training, he became leader of the provincial office of AFDL, in charge of ideology, and at the same time the coordinating secretary of the political and military managerial staff of that organization.

In August 1998, he joined the Congolese gathering for Democracy (RCD). In October 1998, he was posted to Lubero as the territory assistant administrator in charge of administration.

In May 1999, RCD broke into parts and Lubero became a territory of RCD-ML. He was appointed at the electoral commission secretariat to organize the elections of the mayor of the new town of Butembo.

In October 1999, he was appointed administrator of Lubero territory, succeeding Sikuly'Uvasaka Makala, elected mayor of Butembo. He served as Lubero administrator until 3 March 2003.

Paluku's mandate centered on:

- Integrating the forces of CGD/K-ML, called CPA (Congolese People's Army),
- The restoration of the State's authority in Lubero.
- Negotiation with the leaders of CGD/Goma and CGD/K-ML.
- Negotiation at Nambole in Kampala (Mandela National Stadium) in the Ituri conflicts (in 2000).

=== Mayor of Butembo ===
Paluku was appointed mayor of the town of Butembo, succeeding Eric Kamavu (DRC Ambassador to Angola from 2006 to 2009) who became a Minister in the government of RCD/K-ML, located in Beni. He made efforts in putting up a town hall in Butembo in partnership with the Federation of Entreprises of Congo (FEC). In 2003, he initiated the building of the first public parking, the only one in the province of North Kivu. He repaired the main roads to give it a form of a town with round-abouts and sewerage. He built the Cugeki bridge. It was inaugurated on 2 July 2005.

Paluku resisted the progress of the troops of RCD/Goma which camped at the gate of Butembo in June 2003.

=== Mayor of Beni ===
Following the reunification of the country, Paluku was named mayor of Beni on 9 July 2005 and officially assumed function on 18 July 2005. He restored refuse collection, repaired bridges, built offices for services and put up a building for the town of Rwenzori.

During his mandate, Paluku got a degree in Health and Community Development at the Free University of the Great Lakes Region (ULPGL).

=== Provincial Deputy ===
In 2006, Paluku was elected member of the provincial assembly for the constituency of Butembo on the list of Forces of Renewal with 38,800 votes along with 160 candidates.

=== Governor of North Kivu ===
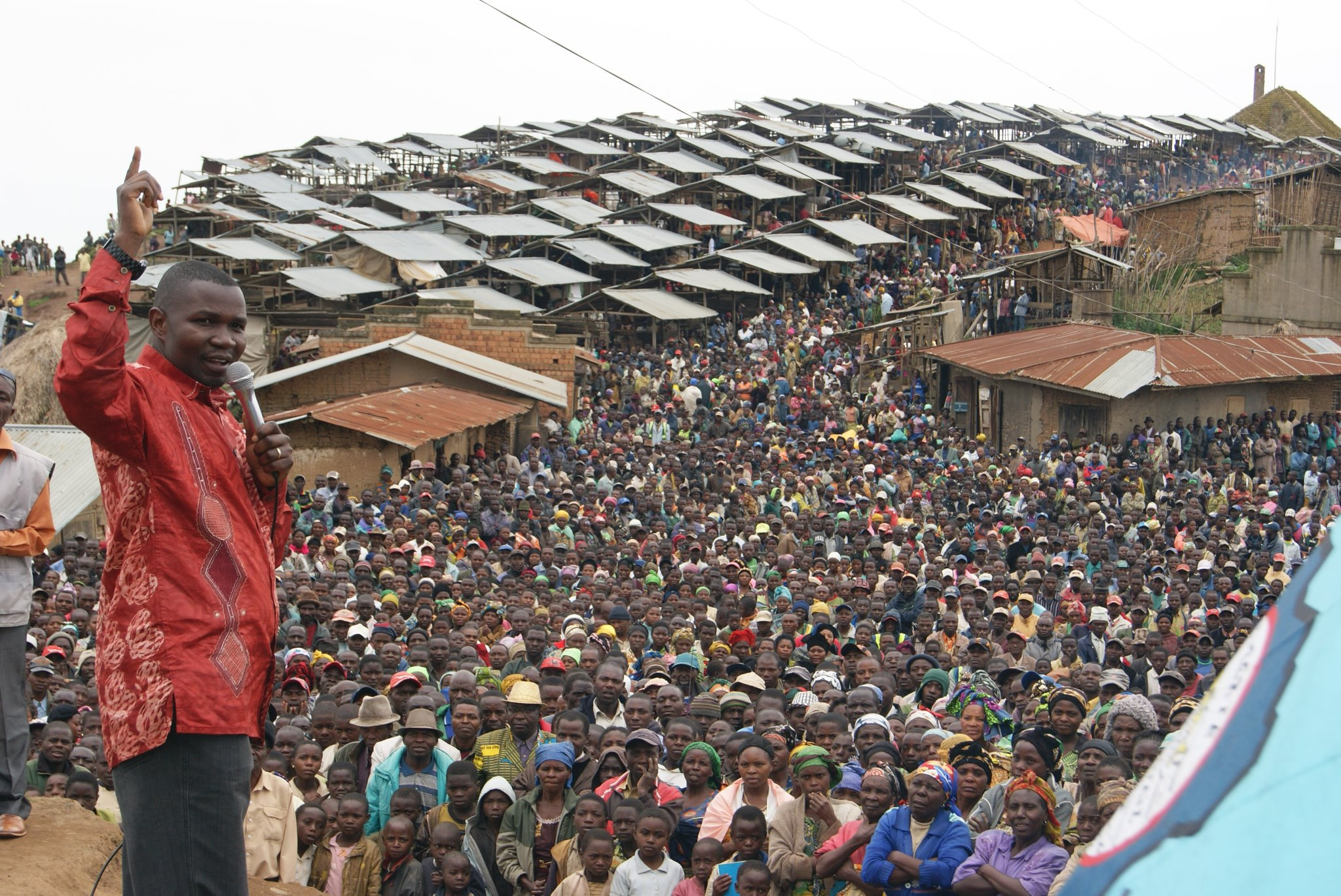
Palaku speaking to a large crowd

On 27 January 2007, Paluku was elected Governor of North Kivu by the provincial assembly of 42 deputies, with 25 votes for and 17 votes against.

The five-year programme focused on:

- Securitization of the province
- Provincial reconciliation
- Peaceful co-existence and development

=== National Deputy ===
On 28 November 2011, he was elected member of the National Assembly for the territory of Lubero.

=== BUREC ===
In 2012, just after the legislative and presidential elections, Lahongya created the political party called BUREC (United Block for the Renaissance and Emergence of Congo).

In 2014 the province of North Kivu for the first time produced an equivalent of one million American dollars against a monthly average of 200 to 400 thousand dollars from 2009 to 2013.

== Butembo RTVH ==
He is the founder of the local media operation of Butembo RTVH, a big media house in the region.

== Criticism ==
In 2007, his election as the first Governor provoked criticism. He took part in radio debates, notably on Okapi Radio, the UN radio that is broadcast country-wide. In 2006, he was appointed spokesman of provincial governors.

In 2008, he was directly implicated in the assassination of Albert Prigogine, a Congolese descendent of the Belgium Nobel Prize winner Ilya Prigogine, by a credible witness. He was accused along with businessmen M. Musanganya, against whom Mr Prigogine had won a judgement ruled by the Supreme Court over a land dispute, of having planned the murder. Mr Paluku specific involvement according to witnesses included providing a secure location and armed officers to execute the plot as well as working against investigators to cover up the murder.

Despite overwhelming evidence tying him to the murder, he has yet to face any repercussions for his direct involvement.

He was accused of ignoring the practical concerns of his station office, instead focusing exclusively on the defense of national territory alongside the armed forces.

In November 2011, he gave electoral support to Joseph Kabila, a candidate who was rejected by the population of eastern Congo. This damaged his popularity. To make matters worse, while CGD/K-ML chair Mbusa Nyamwisi was the presidential candidate, Kahongya chose to campaign for the Majority. He then abandoned Nyamwisi, leading to some top leaders of the old rebellion RCD/KLM to call Palaku an opportunist.

He was attacked as a Catholic who was at the basis of this diabolic machine against Mbusa Nyamwisi. He was accused of collusion with the M23 rebellion that started in April 2012. Nyamwisi was thrown out of the National Assembly in Kinshasa for his supposed links with Rwanda to destabilize the East, along with his colleague Roger Lumbala.

Paluku was accused of embezzling public funds by using provincial projects to enrich himself. The misappropriation of at least 6 million American dollars by the provincial leadership was one of the charges that were used for different censure motions.

Muhindo Nzangi Butomdo and Vahamwiti, who accused Paluku of misappropriation of 6 million, had lost to Paluku in the gubernatorial elections in 2007. Vahamwiti was elected as a provincial deputy in 2006 from Lubero for SMR (Social Movement for Renaissance) with Butondo. When Paluku was elected Governor, SMR launched a campaign to remove him.

== See also ==
- List of governors of North Kivu
