= Agnes Nyirandabaruta =

Rwandan judge

Agnes Nyirandabaruta is a Rwandan judge and vice president of the Court of Appeal of Rwanda since 2020.

== Education and career ==
Agnes Nyirandabaruta earned her first degree from the University of Lubumbashi, DR Congo in 1996 and a master's degree in public international law. She practiced law at the now defunct Kigali Bar Association from 1997 to 2001. She began her judicial career as a judge of the High Court in 2004 and rose through the ranks to become inspector of courts and served in this position for eight years. she was promoted to the Supreme Court of Rwanda in 2015 as a justice. Following the establishment of Court of Appeal of Rwanda in 2018, Nyirandabaruta and 12 other judges were appointed to the court. In 2020, she was appointed vice president of the Court of Appeal. She is credited as one of the judges who reformed Rwandan judicial system between 2003 and 2004.
