= Gizenga =

Gizenga is a surname. Notable people with the surname include:

- Antoine Gizenga (1925–2019), Congolese politician
- Dorothée Gizenga (1961–2022), Congolese politician
- Lugi Gizenga (1965–2020), Congolese politician
