= Théo Ngwabidje =

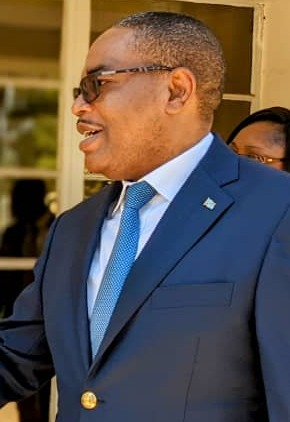

Member of the National Assembly
- Incumbent
- Assumed office 13 February 2024

Governor of South Kivu Province
- In office 9 April 2019 – 2 May 2024
- Preceded by: Claude Bizibuye Nyamugabo
- Succeeded by: Purusi Sadiki Jean-Jacques

Personal details
- Born: Théo Ngwabidje Kasi; 27 March 1971 (age 55) Goma
- Party: Union for Democracy and Social Progress

Théo Ngwabidje Kasi (born 27 March 1971) is a politician from the Democratic Republic of the Congo. He was the Governor of South Kivu Province. He is a member of the Union for Democracy and Social Progress

== Political career ==
In 2021, he suspended 6 Chinese mining companies in South Kivu over environmental violations.

== Personal life ==
He is married to Mrs. Coralie Asseli Kasi and is father of 4 children and one of them is name Daniel Kasi. He is a Christian.
