= Masuka (crater) =

Crater on Mercury

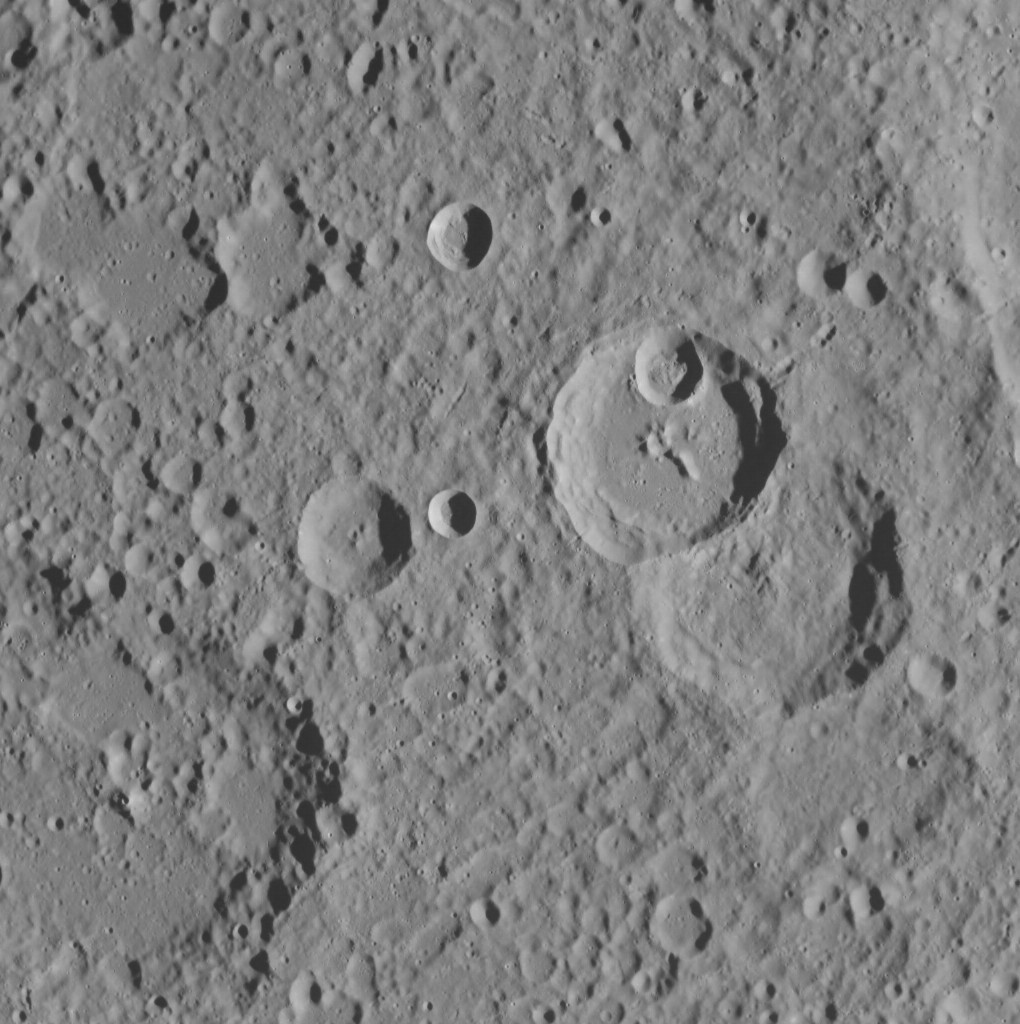
- Masuka is right of center in this MESSENGER WAC image
- Planet: Mercury
- Coordinates: 32.00°N 70.24°W
- Quadrangle: Victoria
- Diameter: 38 km (24 mi)
- Eponym: Dorothy Masuka

Masuka is a crater on Mercury. Its name was adopted by the International Astronomical Union (IAU) on August 13, 2024, for the Zimbabwean-born South African jazz singer Dorothy Masuka, who lived from 1935 to 2019.

Masuka is to the west of the large crater Jobim.

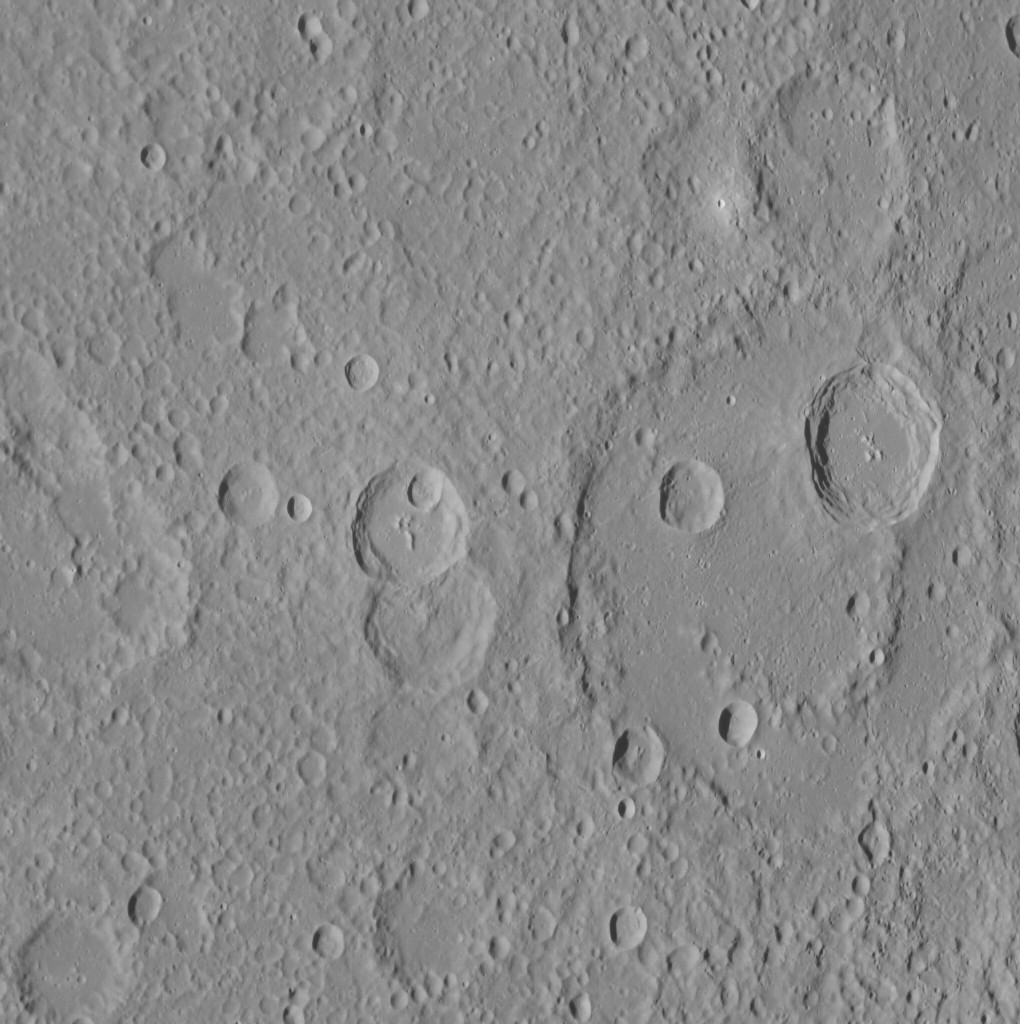
Masuka and Jobim craters
