= 2024 Democratic Republic of the Congo gubernatorial elections =

Gubernatorial elections took place in the Democratic Republic of Congo in 2024 to elect the governors and vice-governors of Kinshasa and the 23 provinces not under state of siege (North Kivu and Ituri provinces are currently under military/police administration). A candidate governor and vice-governor are elected together on one ticket by indirect ballot by the members of the provincial assembly using a two-round system were the second round is used to select between the top two tickets of the first round if no ticket gets an absolute majority.

The elections will take place in four parts. The elections of the governors of Kinshasa and 19 provinces will be held April 29 at the same time as the senate elections. This is followed by the election of the governor of Equateur on May 24 and, on May 26, of the one of Mai-Ndombe. The elections of the last two governors, of Kwilu and Nord-Ubangi, are scheduled for April 2, 2025.

These elections follow the re-election of President Félix Tshisekedi at the 2023 presidential election as well as the legislative and provincial elections held concurrently, with the results of the latter leading to the complete renewal of 22 of the 26 provincial assemblies whose members are responsible for electing governors.

== Results ==
Total governor seats per party
| Party | Seats | | | | | |
| Party | Total | April 29 2024 | Runoff | May 24 | May 29 | April 2 2025 |
|---|---|---|---|---|---|---|
| Independent | 16 | 13 | | 1 | 1 | 1 |
| AB | 2 | 2 | | | | |
| UDPS/Tshisekedi | 2 | 2 | | | | |
| AACPG | 1 | | | | | 1 |
| AFDC-A | 1 | | 1 | | | |
| ANB | 1 | 1 | | | | |
| ARDEV-A | 1 | 1 | | | | |
| Total | 24 | 19 | 1 | 1 | 1 | 2 |

Summary of individual elections
| Province | Number of | | Governor-elect | Votes | Party |
| Province | Can | Dep | Governor-elect | Votes | Party |
|---|---|---|---|---|---|
| Bas-Uélé | 7 | 18 | Mike Mukeni | 17 / 18 | Independent |
| Équateur | 18 | 21 | Bobo Boloko | 14 / 21 | Independent |
| Haut-Katanga | 16 | 48 | Jacques Kyabula | 35 / 47 | ARDEV-A |
| Haut-Lomami | 4 | 26 | Marmont Banza | 17 / 26 | AB |
| Haut-Uélé | 4 | 20 | Jean Bakomito | 11 / 20 | Independent |
| Kasaï | 2 | 33 | Crispin Mukendi | 29 / 32 | UDPS/Tshisekedi |
| Kasaï-Central | 9 | 34 | Joseph Moïse K'ambulu | 19 / 34 | Independent |
| Kasaï-Oriental | 13 | 24 | Jean Paul Mbuebua | 16 / 24 | UDPS/Tshisekedi |
| Kinshasa | 31 | 48 | Daniel Bumba | 37 / 47 | Independent |
| Kongo Central | 14 | 40 | Grâce Nkuanga | 23 / 40 | Independent |
| Kwango | 4 | 24 | Willy Bitwisila | 13 / 24 | Independent |
| Kwilu | 16 | 47 | Philippe Akamituna | 28 / 47 | AACPG |
| Lomami | 5 | 27 | Iron Van Kalombo | 14 / 26 | Independent |
| Lualaba | 6 | 24 | Fifi Masuka | 21 / 24 | Independent |
| Mai-Ndombe | 5 | 18 | Lebon Nkoso | 9 / 18 10 / 18 | Independent |
| Maniema | 7 | 22 | Moïse Mussa | 21 / 21 | Independent |
| Mongala | 5 | 20 | Jean Colins Makaka | 12 / 20 | Independent |
| Nord-Ubangi | 6 | 18 | Jean-Bosco Kotongo | 11 / 18 | Independent |
| Sankuru | 6 | 25 | Victor Kitenge | 15 / 24 | AB |
| South Kivu | 23 | 48 | Jean Jacques Purusi | 20 / 48 27 / 48 | AFDC-A |
| Sud-Ubangi | 6 | 28 | Michée Mobonga | 20 / 26 | Independent |
| Tanganyika | 5 | 25 | Christian Kitungwa | 16 / 24 | Independent |
| Tshopo | 20 | 29 | Paulin Lendongolia | 16 / 29 | Independent |
| Tshuapa | 5 | 18 | Armand Yambe | 18 / 18 | ANB |
Main Source: CENI
