= Richard Ndambu Wolang =

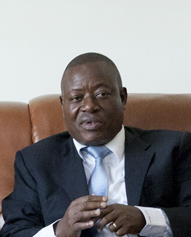
Wolang in 2014

Richard Ndambu Wolang (born 10 March 1952) is a politician of the Democratic Republic of the Congo. He served as the governor of Bandundu Province from 16 March 2007 until 22 May 2012
