= Union for the Nation (Democratic Republic of the Congo) =

Political coalition in the Democratic Republic of the Congo

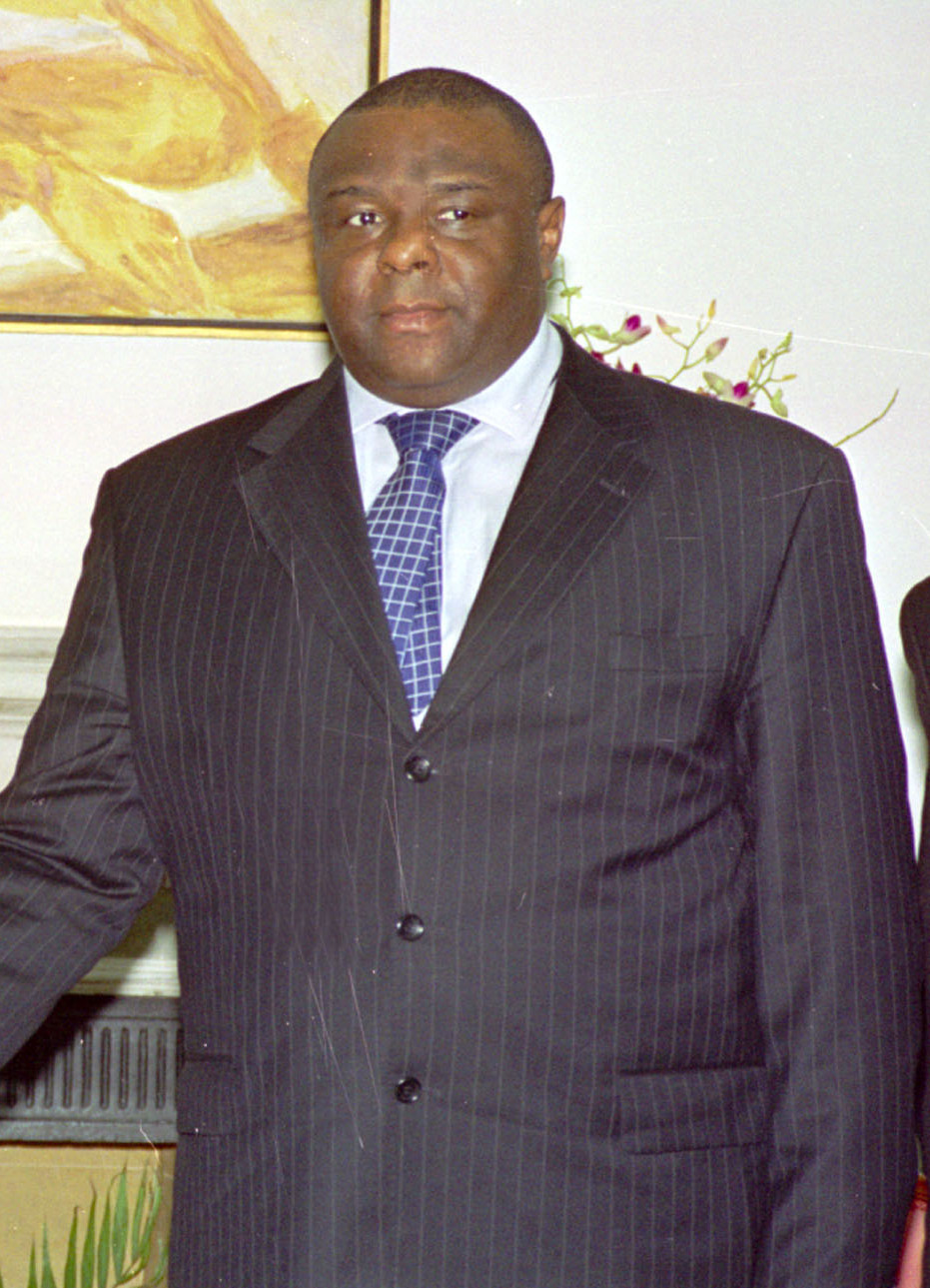
Jean-Pierre Bemba led the Union for the Nation in the 2006 presidential election.

The Union for the Nation (French: Union pour la Nation, UN) is a Congolese electoral bloc formed in 2006 by opposition parties that supported Jean-Pierre Bemba in the 2006 presidential election and succeeding run-off against Joseph Kabila. Bemba has since served as a Deputy Prime Minister in the post-Kabila government of the 2020s.

It was originally constituted as the Group of Congolese Nationalists (French: Regroupement des Nationalistes Congolais, RENACO) for Bemba's presidential candidacy. When Bemba placed second in the first round of the 2006 presidential election, he re-formed RENACO into the Union to support his candidacy in the run-off with Kabila. UN was a broader coalition than RENACO, representing supporters of most of the presidential candidates that had been eliminated in the first round of the presidential election. With the Union's support Bemba received approximately 42% of the runoff vote, but lost to Kabila.

After Bemba lost the election, the Union became a coalition with a more specific focus on nationalism and populism. It is a minority bloc in both the Senate (with 21 out of 108 seats) and National Assembly (with 116 out of 500 seats), only holds one governorship (in Équateur, Bemba's home province) and competed with the Alliance of the Presidential Majority, which is a majority bloc that supports Kabila.

Bemba was arrested in Brussels in 2008, and charged with war crimes and crimes against humanity. He was convicted in 2016, but the conviction was overturned on appeal in 2017. Despite Bemba's absence from the country and legal proceedings, the party won one seat in the National Assembly in the 2011 Democratic Republic of the Congo general election.

== Member parties ==
- Movement for the Liberation of the Congo
- Union for the Congo's Reconstruction, led by Dr. Oscar Kashala
