= List of provincial governors of the Democratic Republic of the Congo =

This is a list of all the governors of provinces of the Democratic Republic of the Congo.

== Current governors ==
Province	Governor	Since	Notes
Bas-Uele	Mike Mokeni	26 June 2024	
Équateur	Bobo Boloko Bolumbu	January 2018	
Haut-Katanga	Jacques Kyabula Katwe	20 May 2019	
Haut-Lomami	Marmont Banza	2 July 2024	
Haut-Uele	Jean Bakomito	2 July 2024	
Ituri	Johnny Luboya Nkashama	6 May 2021	military governor
Kasaï	Crispin Mukendi	28 June 2024	
Kasaï-Central	Joseph Moïse Kambulu	17 June 2024	
Kasaï-Oriental	Augustin Kayemba	19 May 2025	acting governor
Kinshasa	Daniel Bumba	21 June 2024	
Kongo Central	Grâce Bilolo	26 June 2024	
Kwango	Willy Bitwisila	3 July 2024	
Kwilu	Philippe Akamituna	15 May 2025	
Lomami	Iron-Van Kalombo	2 July 2024	
Lualaba	Fifi Masuka Saini	4 January 2021	acting governor to 12 July 2024
Mai-Ndombe	Lebon Nkoso Kevani	5 August 2024	
Maniema	Moïse Mussa	19 July 2024	
Mongala	Jean-Collins Makaka	2 July 2024	
Nord-Kivu	Evariste Somo Kakule	28 January 2025	military governor
Nord-Ubangi	Jean Bosco Kotongo	20 May 2025	
Sankuru	Victor Kitenge	10 August 2024	
Sud-Kivu	Jean Jacques Purusi	24 June 2024	
Sud-Ubangi	Michée Mobonga	July 2024	
Tanganyika	Christian Kitungwa	16 July 2024	
Tshopo	Paulin Lendongolia	17 April 2024	acting governor to 28 June 2024
Tshuapa	Armand Yambe	c. July 2024	
Main Source: Rulers

== See also ==
- Lists of provincial governors of the Democratic Republic of the Congo
- 2024 Democratic Republic of the Congo gubernatorial elections
