= List of governors of Maniema =

Maniema in the Democratic Republic of the Congo

This list of governors of Maniema includes governors of the Maniema Province, Democratic Republic of the Congo from when it was first formed on 14 August 1962 until 25 April 1966, when it was merged with Kivu Central to form Sud-Kivu. It also covers governors from when Maniema was again formed from part of Kivu Province on 20 July 1988 to the present.

== First period (1962–1966) ==
The governors in the period from 14 August 1962 until 25 April 1966 were:

Start	End	Officeholder	Title
12 Sep 1962	1962	Ignace Kanga	President
5 Nov 1962	19 Sep 1963	Hilaire Kisanga	President
1963	1964		President
22 Jun 1964	21 Jul 1964	Joseph Tshomba-Fariala	President (1st time)
24 Jul 1964	5 Oct 1964	Charles Malembe (b. 1933)	President
1964	Jan 1966	Joseph Tshomba-Fariala	President (2nd time), then from 1965, governor
24 Jan 1966	25 Apr 1966	Pascal Luanghy (1917–2015)	Governor

== Second period (1988 – present) ==
The governors from 20 July 1988 to the present were:

Start	End	Officeholder
20 July 1988		Tshala Muana
1991	1992	Kyembwa wa Lumona
1992		Joseph Bendera
1992	1997	Omari Lea Sisi (1951–2016)
March 1997	July 1997	Lokombe Kitete
18 July 1997	3 October 1998	Ramazani Shadari (1st time) (b. 1960)
December 1998	12 April 2000	Nestor Kiyimbi (in rebellion)
12 April 2000	2003	Gertrude Kitembo (f) (b. 1958) (in rebellion)
*May 2002*		Ramazani Shadari (2nd time)
2003	26 May 2004	Falay Selenge
26 May 2004	16 March 2007	Koloso Sumaili
16 March 2007	June 2010	Didier Manara Linga (b. 1964)
June 2010	16 December 2017	Pascal Tutu Salumu (b. 1963)
16 December 2017	21 May 2019	Jérôme Bikenge Musimbi (acting) (b. 1962)
21 May 2019		Augustin Musafiri Myoma (b. 1964)

== See also ==
- List of governors of Kivu
- Lists of provincial governors of the Democratic Republic of the Congo
