= Michaël Ngoy =

Swiss ice hockey player

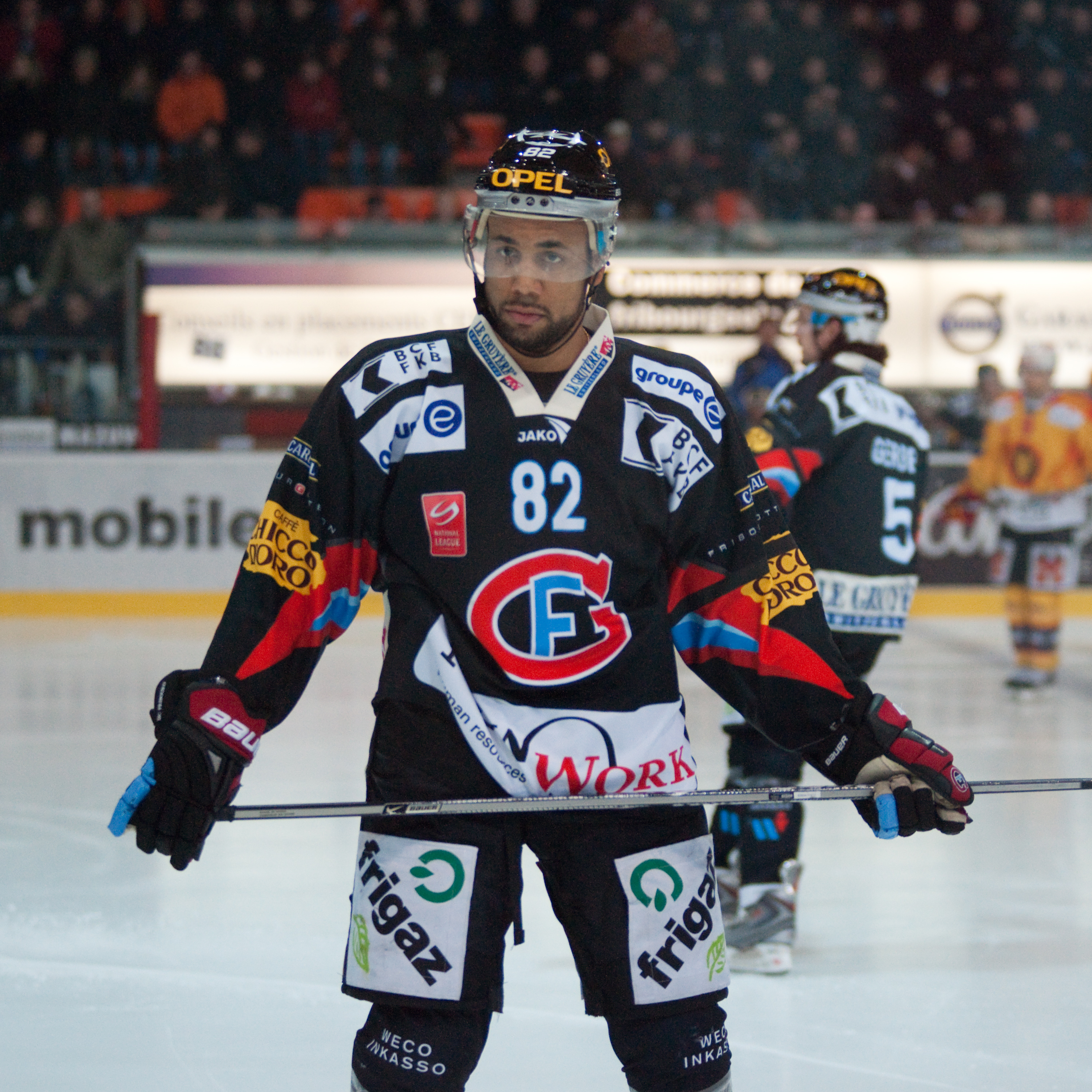
- Born: January 10, 1982 (age 43); Lausanne, Switzerland
- Height: 6 ft 0 in (183 cm)
- Weight: 192 lb (87 kg; 13 st 10 lb)
- Position: Defence
- Shot: Left
- Played for: Lausanne HC; HC Fribourg-Gottéron; HC Ambrì-Piotta
- Playing career: 2000–2021

Michaël Ngoy (born January 10, 1982) is a Swiss former professional ice hockey defenceman. He spent 20 seasons in the National League (NL) with 3 different teams.

== Playing career ==
Ngoy previously played for Lausanne HC and HC Fribourg-Gottéron before signing for HC Ambrì-Piotta for the 2016-17 season. He signed an extension with the team on June 22, 2018 and signed a further extension with the team on April 24, 2019.

Ngoy retired from professional hockey following the 2020–21 season. He played 881 NL games over 20 seasons with Lausanne, Fribourg and Ambri-Piotta.
