= Fifi Masuka Saini =

Congolese politician (born 1967)

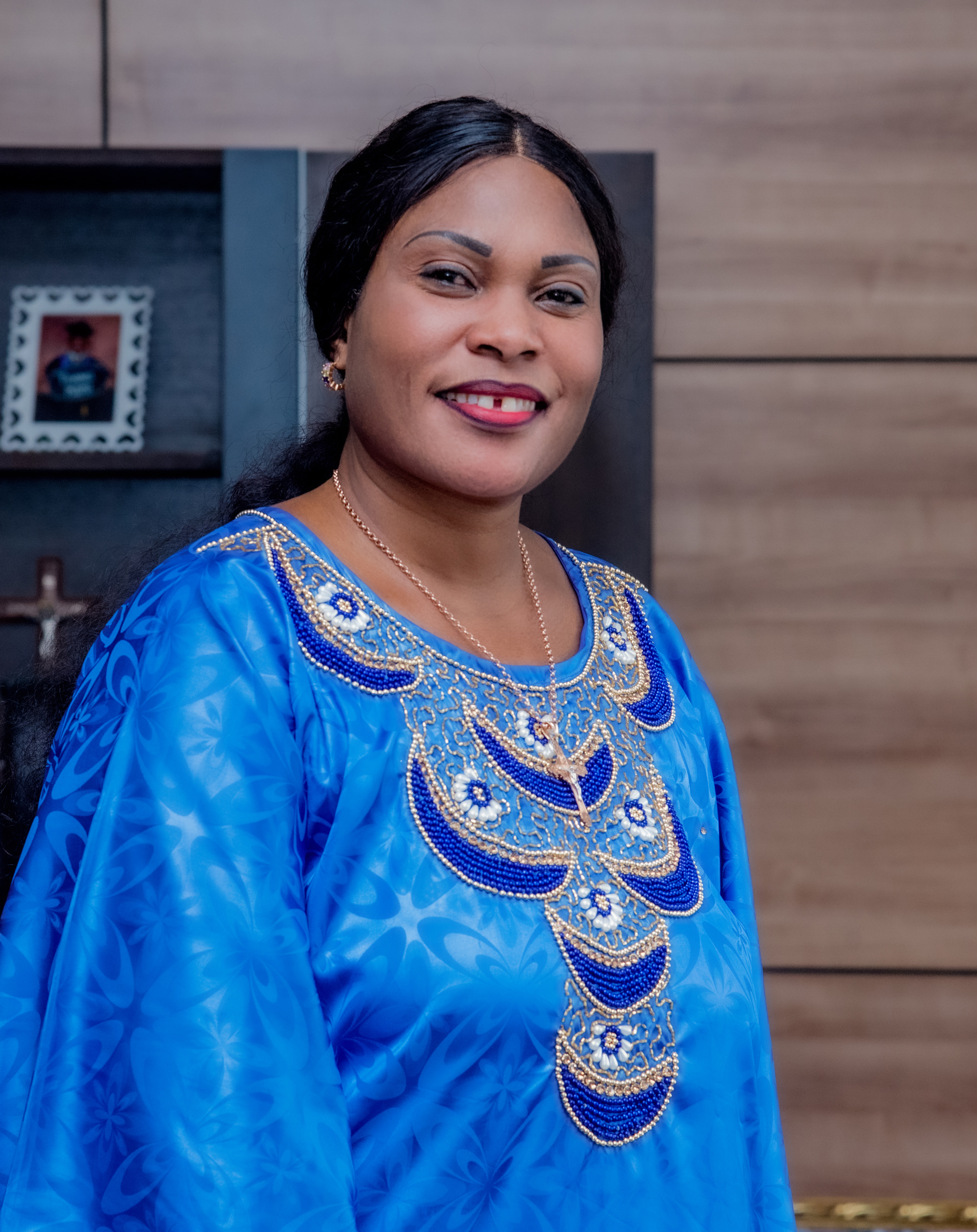

Governor of Lualaba Province
- Incumbent
- Assumed office April 2024

Vice-governor of Lualaba Province
- In office 2016–2024
- Governor: Richard Muyej

Member of the National Assembly
- Incumbent
- Assumed office 2006
- Constituency: Lubumbashi

Personal details
- Born: 10 March 1967 (age 59) Lubumbashi, Zaire
- Education: University of Lubumbashi

Fifi Masuka Saini (born 10 March 1967) is a Congolese politician serving as the current governor of Lualaba Province since 2024. Born in Lubumbashi, she obtained a Bachelor's degree in economics from the University of Lubumbashi. She was elected a member of the National Assembly in 2006 for Lubumbashi. In 2016, she was elected vice-governor for Lualaba Province, and reelected in 2019. When then-governor Richard Muyej sought treatment in South Africa in January 2021, she was appointed acting governor. She was elected governor in 2024.

== Early life and career ==
Fifi Masuka Saini was born on 10 March 1967 in Lubumbashi, Zaire, as the fifth child of six. Her mother, Yvonne Kashala, was a smoked fish seller, and her father, Saini Kanji, was a taxi driver. She obtained a Bachelor's degree in applied economics in 1992 from the University of Lubumbashi. She co-founded the mining and construction company BM-METALS CORPORATION.

== Political career ==
Masuka joined the Movement for the Liberation of Congo (MLC) in 2000. She was elected one of the National Assembly deputies for the electoral district of Lubumbashi in the 2006 general election, and was re-elected in the 2011 general election. She founded her own political party, Front des Indépendants Démocrates-Chrétiens (FIDEC), in 2010.

Richard Muyej won the governorship of Lualaba Province with Masuka as his vice-governor the 2016 gubernatorial elections. She was reelected in 2019. In January 2021, Muyej was evacuated to South Africa to undergo treatment. Masuka became acting governor, and Muyej was removed from his position on 10 September. Her interim provincial government launched a "zero delinquent" operation in August 2022 within Kolwezi. At least three deaths occurred during the operation, one from narcotics overdose. Commissioner general for tourism and rural development of Lualaba, Joseph Tshimwanga Mutombo, established a provincial tourism observatory (board of tourism data and analytics) in 2022 in response to Masuka's promotion of tourism to the province.

She won the 2024 gubernatorial election for Lualaba Province, securing 21 of the 24 voters. Her administration put forth a five-year plan with a budget over FC6.8 trillion (US$3 billion). The plan involves infrastructure projects including upgrades to Kolwezi International Airport, a modern clinic, and a road interchange. She was received on a visit to the Vatican by Pope Francis in January 2025.

== Personal life ==
Masuka is married with a family. She is a devout Catholic.
