= Jobim (crater) =

Crater on Mercury

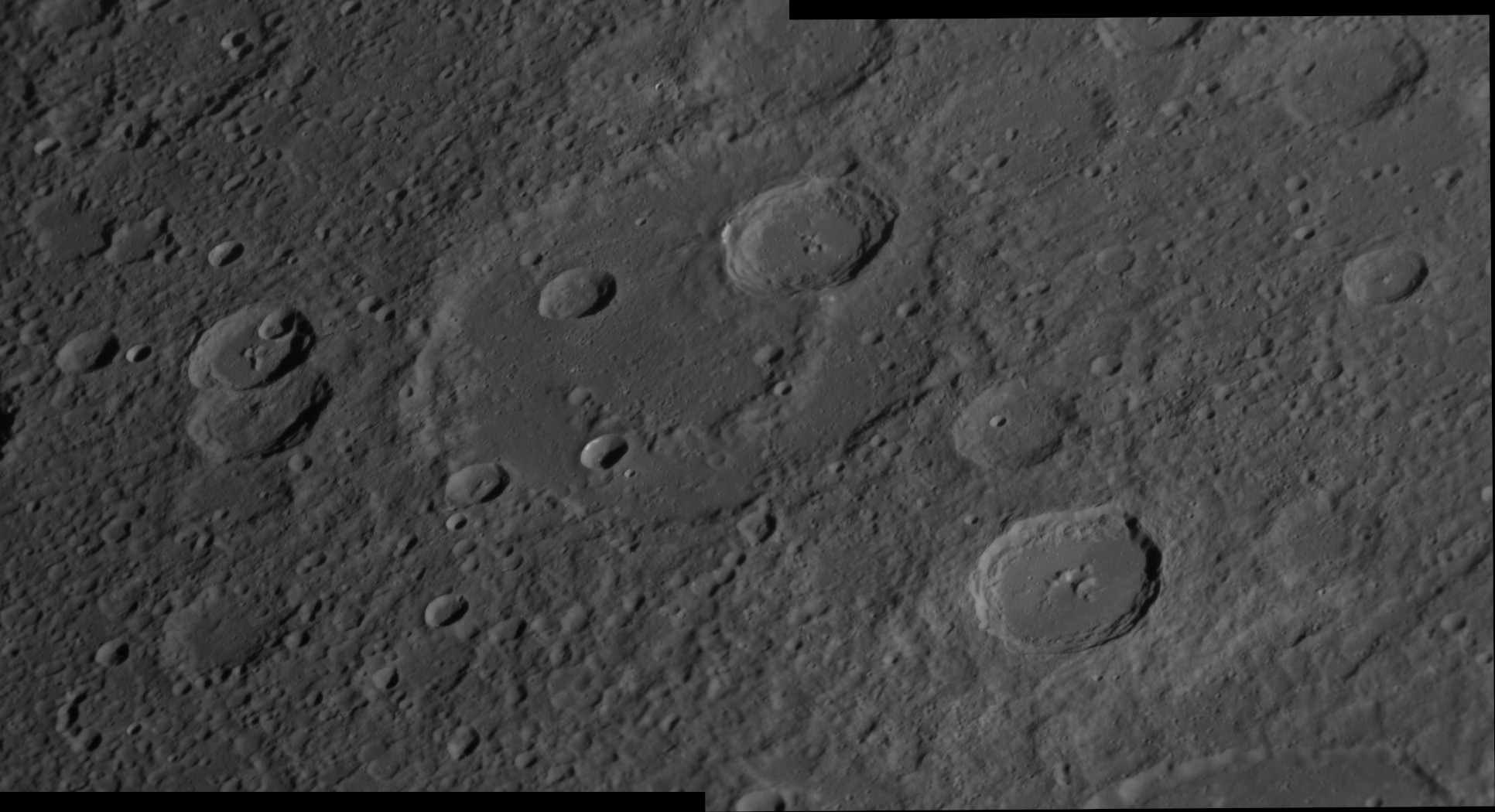
- MESSENGER NAC mosaic from second flyby in October 2008
- Planet: Mercury
- Coordinates: 32.45°N 66.88°W
- Quadrangle: Victoria
- Diameter: 167 km (104 mi)
- Eponym: Antônio Carlos Jobim

Jobim is a crater on Mercury. It has a diameter of 167 kilometres (104 miles). Its name was adopted by the International Astronomical Union (IAU) on September 25, 2015. Jobim is named for the Brazilian composer Antônio Carlos Jobim.

Jobim is one of 110 peak ring basins on Mercury.

To the west of Jobim is the crater Masuka. To the southeast is the prominent crater Praxiteles.

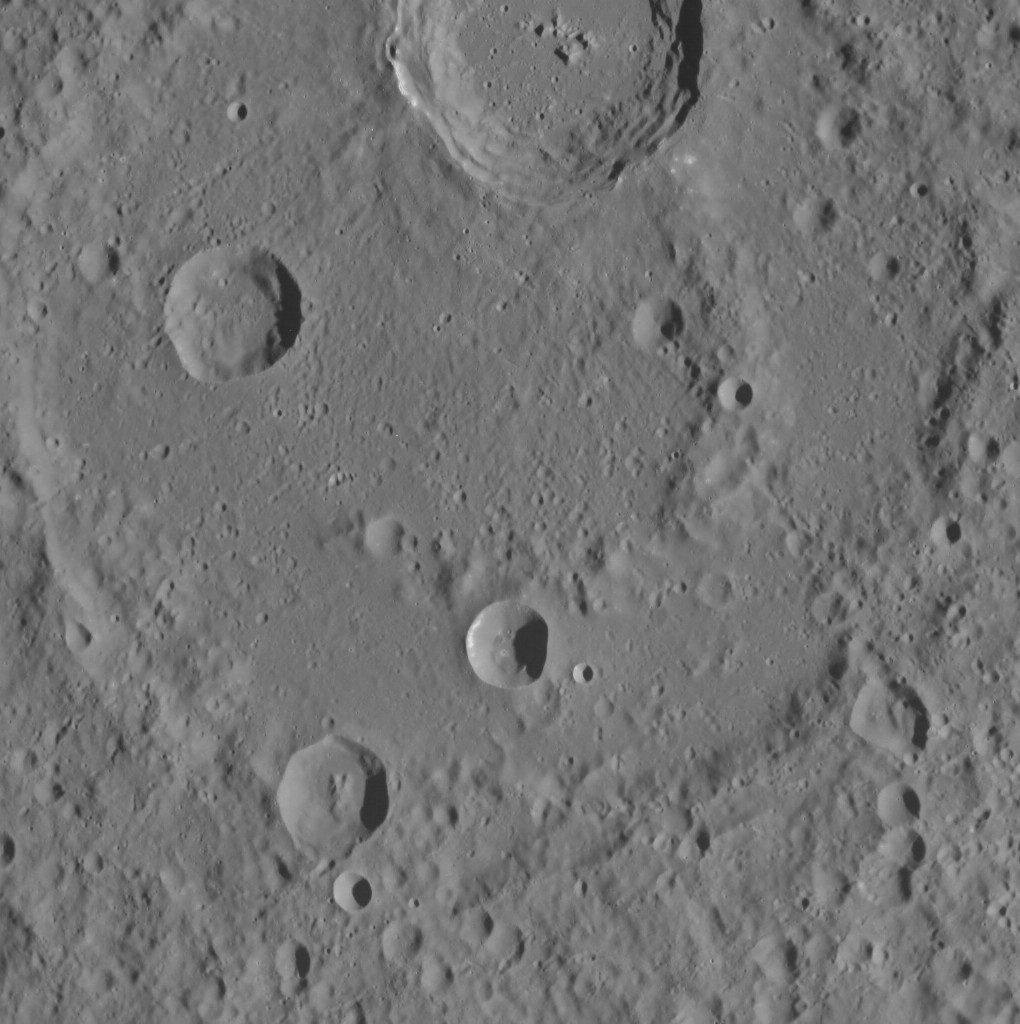
Another view from MESSENGER

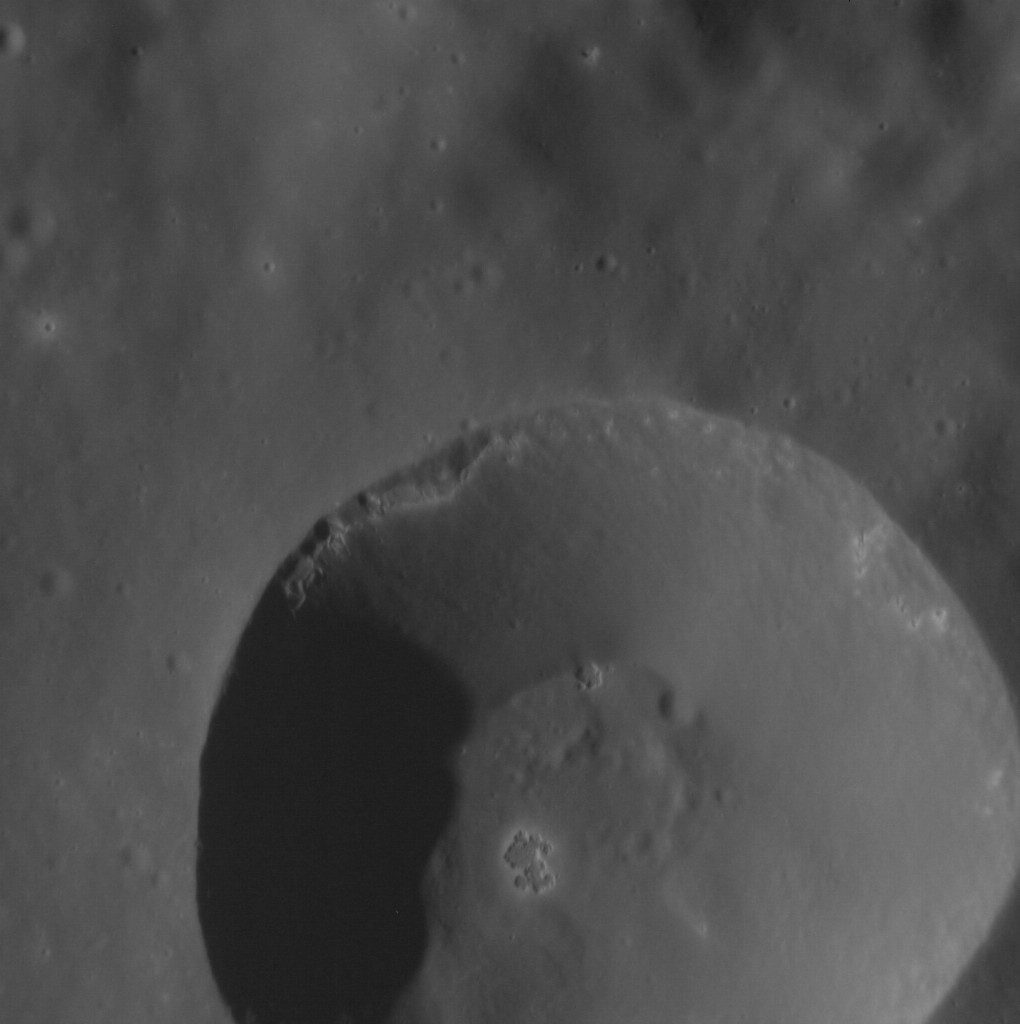
Close up of 12 km diameter crater with hollows in the southern half of Jobim
