= Eugène Serufuli Ngayabaseka =

Congolese politician

Eugène Serufuli Ngayabaseka (born 1962) is a Congolese politician, the ex 2nd Vice President of the Congolese Rally for Democracy-Goma and was the governor of Nord-Kivu province from July 31, 2000 until 2007, when was succeeded by the RCD-K-ML candidate, Paluku Kahongya Julien.

Serufuli is a Hutu member of the Banyarwanda ethnic minority, who are native to the territory of Rutshuru. He was born in Ruruma, Rutshuru district, North Kivu province. He studied at the Kinshasa University and worked as an anaesthetist at the Goma General Hospital. He was head of the hospital trade union and was an activist in the MAGREVI organisation which campaigned for Banyarwanda rights.

== Political career ==
In August 1998 he joined the political board of the RCD and in October 2000, in the middle of the Second Congo War, he was appointed Governor of North Kivu by the Congolese Rally for Democracy. The appointment of a Hutu Banyarwanda was designed to bring them into an alliance with the predominantly Tutsi Banyarwanda led RCD and their Tutsi Rwandan government backers against the anti-Tutsi Army for the Liberation of Rwanda and indigenous Congolese ethnic groups such as the Hunde, Nyanga and Tembo.

In 2003, Serufuli created a "Local Defense Force" militia which was estimated to have numbered around 20,000. Non-government organizations accused him of recruiting children and Rwandan soldiers who had demobbed following the departure of the Rwandan army from DR Congo. Which were later proven to be false accusations.

In 2014, he was appointed as the minister of rural development. In 2016, he was appointed as the minister of small and medium companies.

== See also ==
- List of governors of North Kivu
