= University of Lubumbashi =

University in Democratic Republic of the Congo

- Université de Lubumbashi
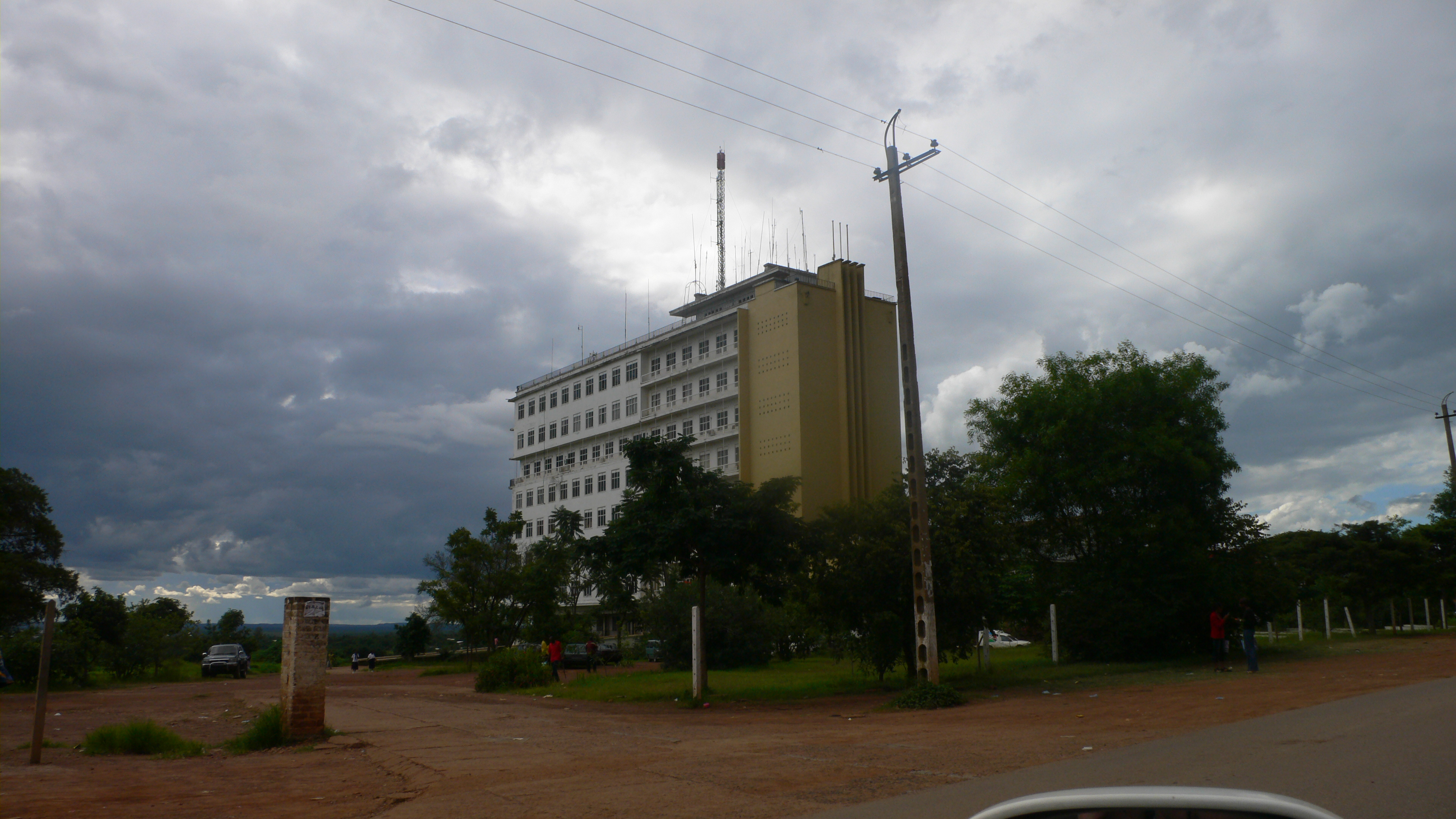
- Type: Public
- Established: 1955; 71 years ago
- Rector: Kishiba Fitula Gilbert
- Students: 33,000
- Location: Lubumbashi, Democratic Republic of the Congo; 11°36′52″S 27°28′50″E
- Website: www.unilu.ac.cd

The University of Lubumbashi (French: Université de Lubumbashi), also known by the acronym UNILU, is one of the largest universities in the Democratic Republic of the Congo. It is located in Lubumbashi in Haut-Katanga Province, previously Katanga Province. The campus is located in the northern part of the city, west of the Lubumbashi International Airport.

== History ==
The university was created in 1955 under Belgian colonial rule as the Official University of the Congo and Ruanda-Urundi (French: Université officielle du Congo et du Ruanda-Urundi) by the University of Liège and opened in 1956. It was one of the institutions merged into the National University of Zaire in 1971. It was re-established as an autonomous university in 1981 when the National University of Zaire was split up.

== The 1990 massacre ==
In May 1990 Zaire's government violently suppressed student protests on the campus, killing several students and destroying parts of the campus.

In early May 1990, students studying at the university protested against Mobutu's regime, demanding his resignation. On the night of 11 May 1990, electricity was cut off to the campus while a special military unit called Les Hiboux ("The Owls") were sent in, armed with machetes and bayonets. The unit's name came from the fact that the unit only operated at night. Little is known for certain about the nocturnal unit Les Hiboux, but their use of expensive vehicles (rarities in Zaire) to travel around strongly suggested that the unit was an elite force made of regime loyalists. Over the course of the night, the men of Les Hiboux bayoneted and hacked to pieces the protesting students. Those students who attempted to flee the campus were shot down. By the dawn of 12 May 1990, at least 290 students had been killed with the halls of the campus soaked in blood and dismembered human body parts. The massacre led to the nations of the European Economic Community (now the European Union), the United States, and Canada to end all non-humanitarian aid to Zaire, which marked the beginning of the end of Western support for Mobutu. Zaire as the Congo was then known was a former Belgian colony and the massacre received much media attention in Belgium, which forced the Belgian government to criticise Mobutu.

== Gallery ==
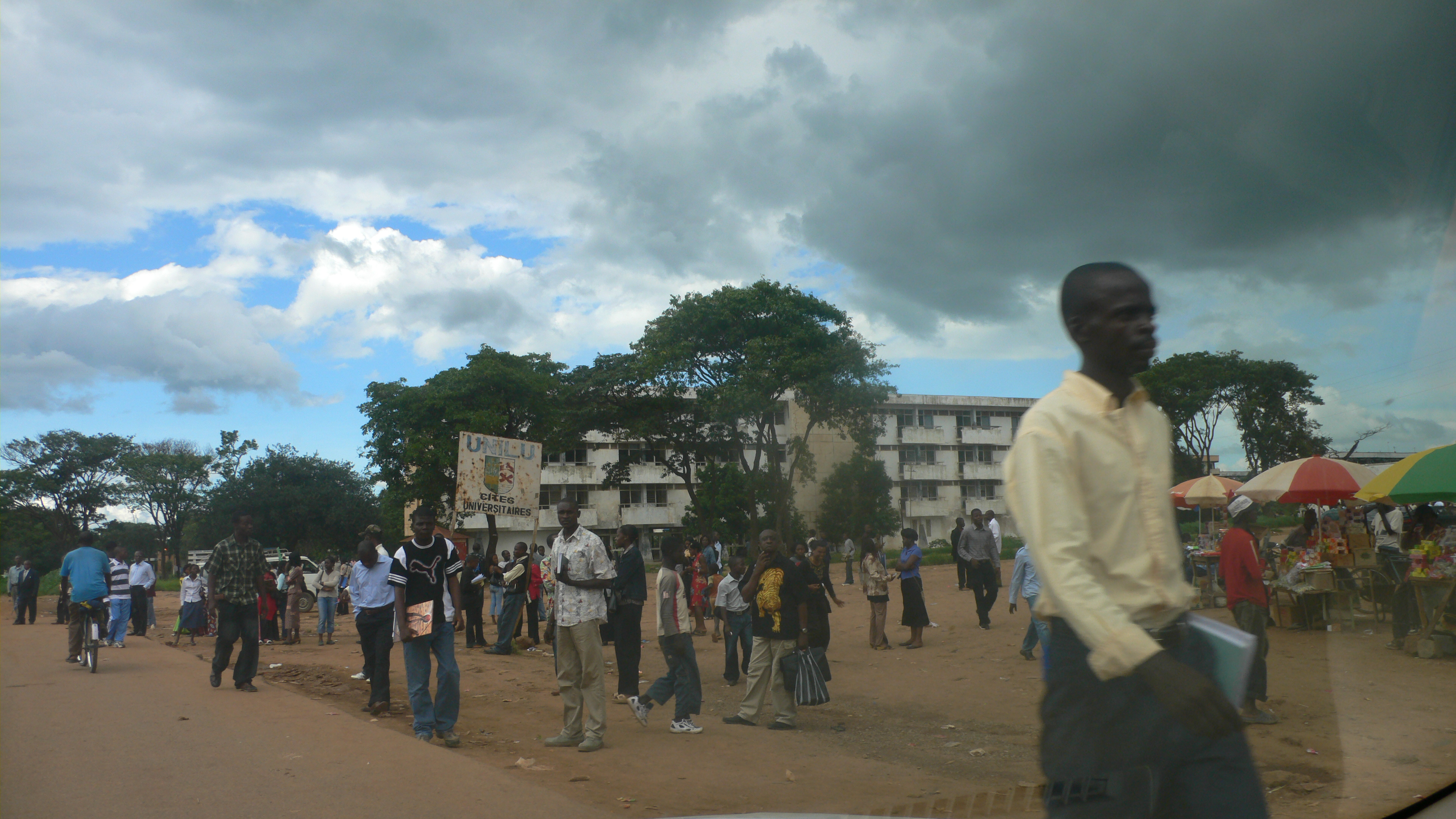
University of Lubumbashi Campus

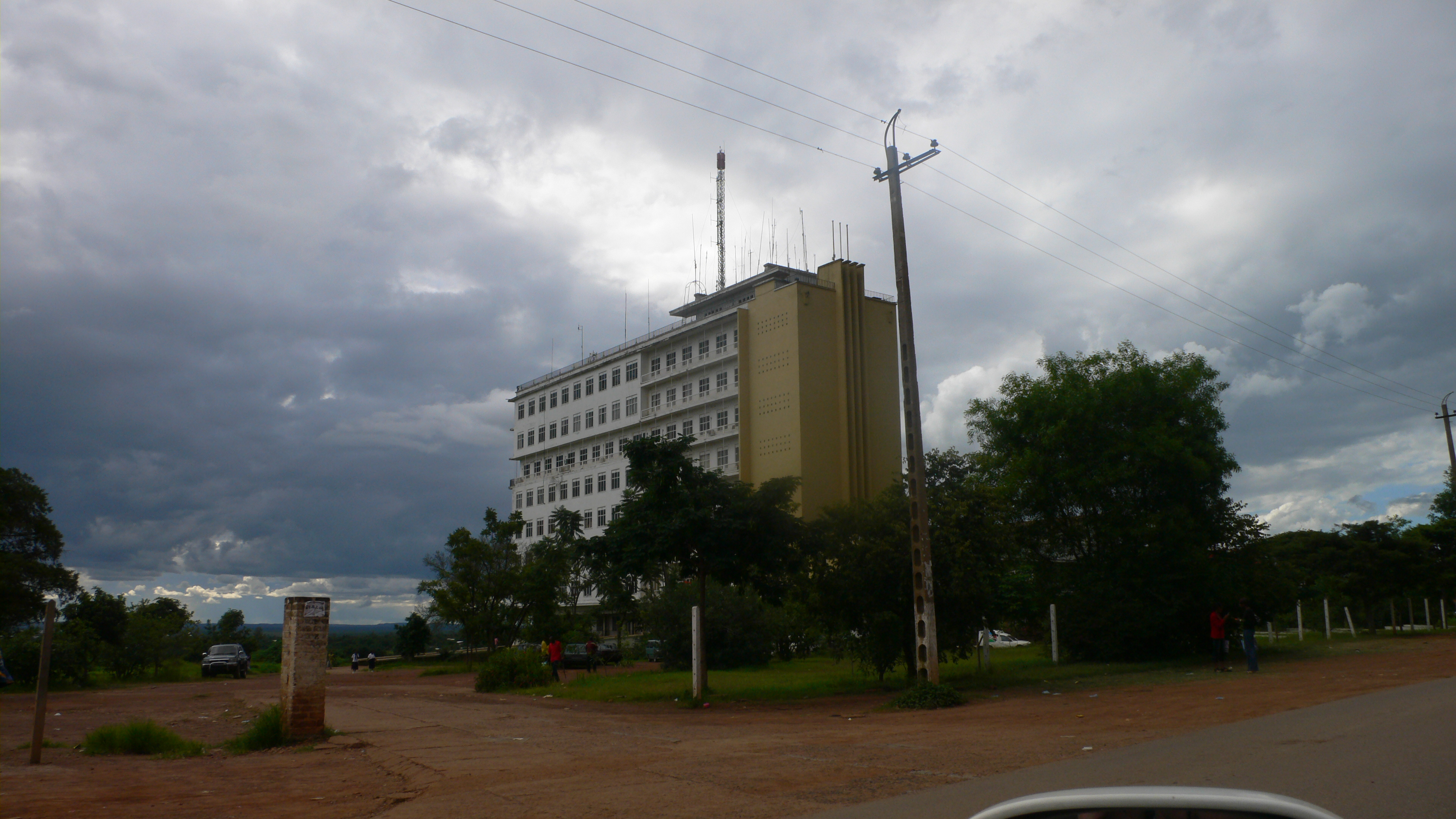
Administration building

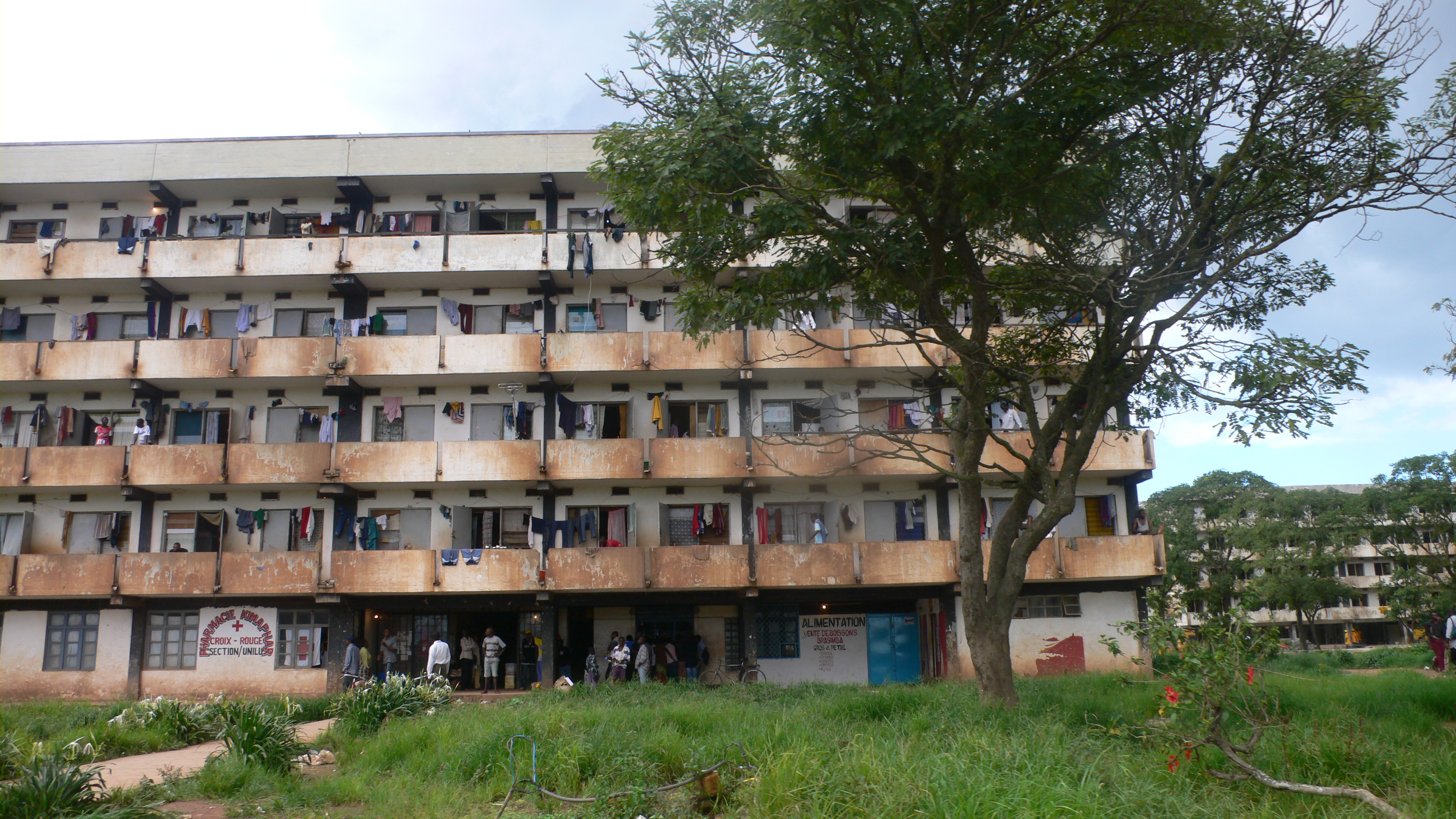
University of Lubumbashi Campus

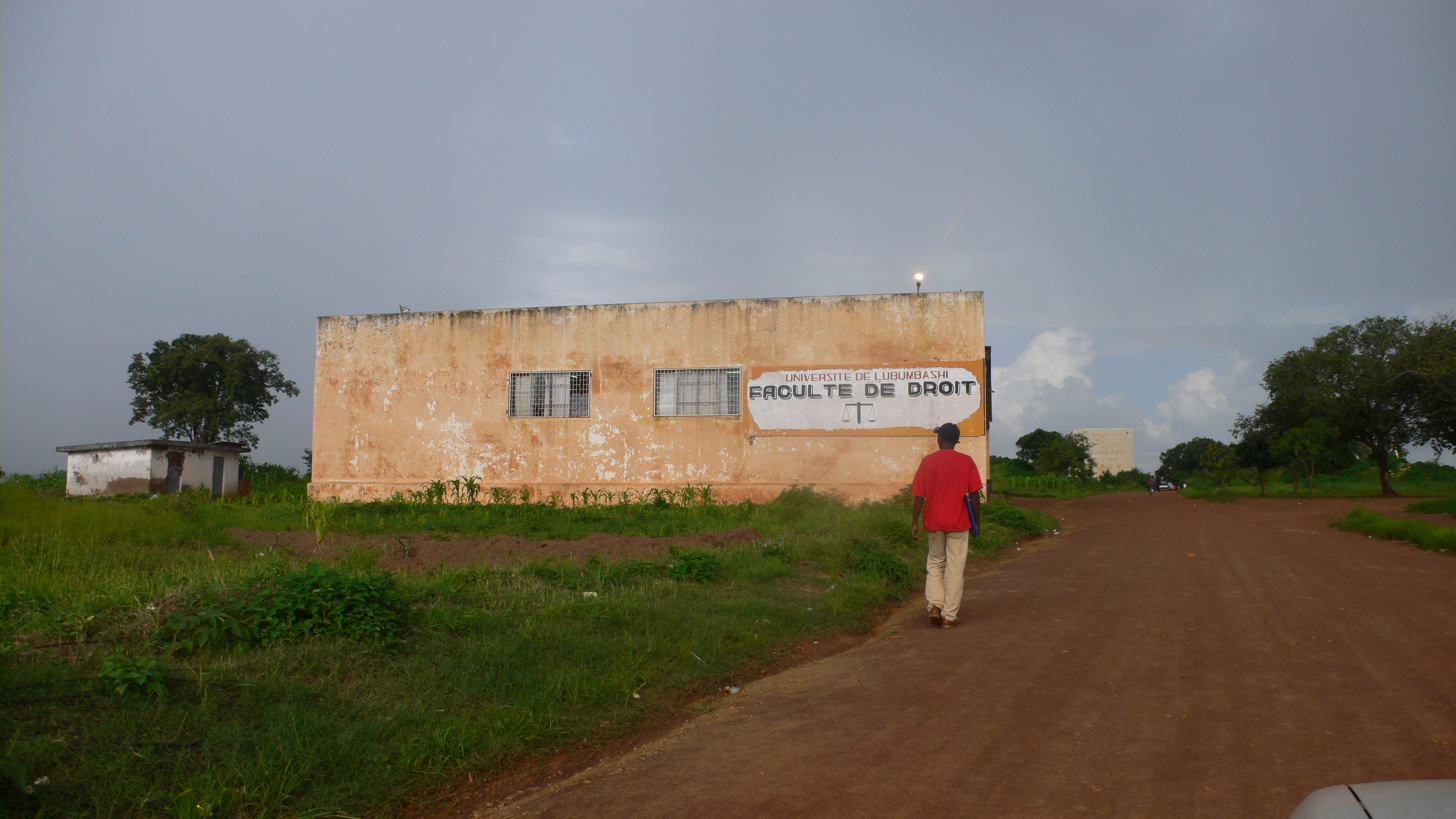
Law Faculty

== Notable faculty ==
- Edgar C. Polomé, linguist

== Notable alumni ==
- Sammy Baloji, photographer
- Fifi Masuka Saini, politician
- Christophe Munzihirwa Mwene Ngabo, Roman Catholic archbishop
- Agnes Nyirandabaruta, vice president of Court of Appeal of Rwanda
- General William Yakutumba, rebel commander

== Books ==
- Kisangani, Emizet F. (2016). Historical Dictionary of the Democratic Republic of the Congo. Latham: Rowman & Littlefield Publishers. ISBN 9781442273160.
- Weiss, Harvey (1995). "Zaire: Collapsed Society, Surviving State, Future Polity". In Jacob Blaustein &: Ira William Zartman (ed.). Collapsed States The Disintegration and Restoration of Legitimate Authority. Boulder, CO: L. Rienner Publishers. pp. 157–160. ISBN 9781555875602.
- Dibwe dia Mwembu, Donatien; Kilanga Musinde, Julien; Jewsiewicki, Bogumil; Klauber, Véronique (2003). Université de Lubumbashi, 1990-2002: société en détresse, pari sur l'avenir. Paris: L'Harmattan. ISBN 9782747548588.
