= List of governors of North Kivu =

North Kivu in the Democratic Republic of the Congo

This list of governors of North Kivu includes governors of the North Kivu province of the Democratic Republic of the Congo in the period from 1962 to 1966 when it was split out from the province of Kivu, and in the period from 1988 onward when it was again separate from Kivu.

== First period (1962–1966) ==
The governors were:

Start	End	Officeholder	Title
11 September 1962	6 July 1965	Benezeth Moley (b. 1927)	Governor
6 July 1965	28 December 1966	Denis Paluku (1936–2014)	Governor

== Second period (1988–present) ==
The governors were:

Start	End	Officeholder	Title
20 July 1988	1990	Konde Vila Kikanda	Governor
12 June 1990	17 June 1990	Koyagialo Ngbase te Gerengbo (1947–2014)	Governor
	1991	Basembe Emina	Governor
1991	August 1993	Kalumbo Mbogho	Governor
August 1993	November 1996	Moto Mupenda (interim)	Governor
October 1996	31 July 2000	Léonard Kanyamuhanga (d. 2000)	Governor (in rebellion to 1997 and from Aug 1998)
23 September 1999		Kaisazira Mbaki	Governor (in rebellion)
31 July 2000	24 February 2007	Eugène Serufuli Ngayabaseka (b. 1962)	Governor (in rebellion to 16 May 2004)
24 February 2007	22 February 2019	Julien Paluku Kahongya (b. 1968)	Governor
22 February 2019	28 June 2019	Feller Lutaichirwa Mulwahale (b. 1966)	Governor
28 June 2019	May 2021	Carly Nzanzu Kasivita (b. 1975)	Governor
May 2021	19 September 2023	Constant Ndima Kongba	Military governor
19 September 2023	24 January 2025	Peter Cirimwami Nkuba	Military governor
28 January 2025		Evariste Somo Kakule	Military governor

== See also ==
- Lists of provincial governors of the Democratic Republic of the Congo
- List of governors of Kivu
