= Trésor Kapuku Ngoy =

Trésor Kapuku Ngoy is a Congolese businessman, politician and Christian minister.

He is a former governor of Kasai-Occidental province. Hubert Mbingho was his vice-governor. He was voted out of office by the provincial assembly on June 7, 2007, but the Supreme Court in Kinshasa challenged the disposal as unconstitutional. He was succeeded as governor by Hubert Kabasubabo in 2011.

He owns a rock quarry business. Trésor Kapuku Ngoy is married to Angelique. They have three sons and a daughter, who moved to the United States for their education.
