= Anicet Kashamura =

Congolese politician (1928– 2004)

Minister of Information of the Republic of the Congo
- In office 24 June 1960 – 5 September 1960
- President: Joseph Kasa-Vubu
- Prime Minister: Patrice Lumumba
- Succeeded by: Jean Bolikango

Personal details
- Born: 17 December 1928 Kalehe, Kivu Province, Belgian Congo
- Died: 18 August 2004 (aged 75)
- Party: Centre du Regroupement Africain

Anicet Kashamura (17 December 1928 – 18 August 2004) was a Congolese politician.

== Biography ==
=== Early life and career ===
Anicet Kashamura was born in 1928 in the locality of Kalehe in Kivu Province, Belgian Congo. From 1948 to 1956 he worked as an accountant for different agencies of the colonial administration. Afterwards he became a journalist and entered politics. In 1958 he co-founded the Centre du Regroupement Africain (CEREA) party. Following Congolese independence in 1960, Kashamura became Prime Minister Patrice Lumumba's minister of information, until himself and Lumumba were dismissed by President Joseph Kasa-Vubu on 5 September.

After Laurent-Désiré Kabila seized power in the Congo in May 1997, Kashamura was appointed chairman of a commission charged with drafting a new constitution for the country.

=== Death ===
He died on 18 August 2004.
