= Alliance of the Presidential Majority =

The Alliance of the Presidential Majority (French: Alliance de la majorité présidentielle; AMP), commonly shortened to the Presidential Majority, was the ruling political alliance in the Democratic Republic of Congo from 2006 to 2018. It was formed on 24 June 2006 by then President Joseph Kabila to support his candidacy for the 2006 general election. It held a majority in both the National Assembly and Senate until 2018, when the alliance was dissolved and succeeded by the Common Front for Congo.

== Components ==
Composite parties of the Alliance of the Presidential Majority
	Leader	Seats in the National Assembly
People's Party for Reconstruction and Democracy (PPRD)	Joseph Kabila	111
Unified Lumumbist Party (PALU)	Antoine Gizenga	34
Social Movement for Renewal (MSR)	Pierre Lumbi	27
Coalition of Congolese Democrats (CODECO)	Jean-Claude Muyambo	10
Union of Mobutist Democrats (UDEMO)	Nzanga Mobutu	9
Federalist Christian Democracy – Convention of Federalists for Christian Democracy (DCF-COFEDEC)	Pierre Pay-Pay wa Syakasighe	8
Christian Democrat Party (PDC)	José Endundo	8
Union of Federalist Nationalists of Congo (UNAFEC)		7
United Congolese Convention (CCU)		4
National Alliance Party for Unity (PANU)	André-Philippe Futa	3
Alliance for the Renewal of Congo (ARC)	Olivier Kamitatu Etsu	2
Others		109
Total		332 out of 500

== See also ==
- Congolese National Convention
- Union for the Nation
