= Brazil–Democratic Republic of the Congo relations =

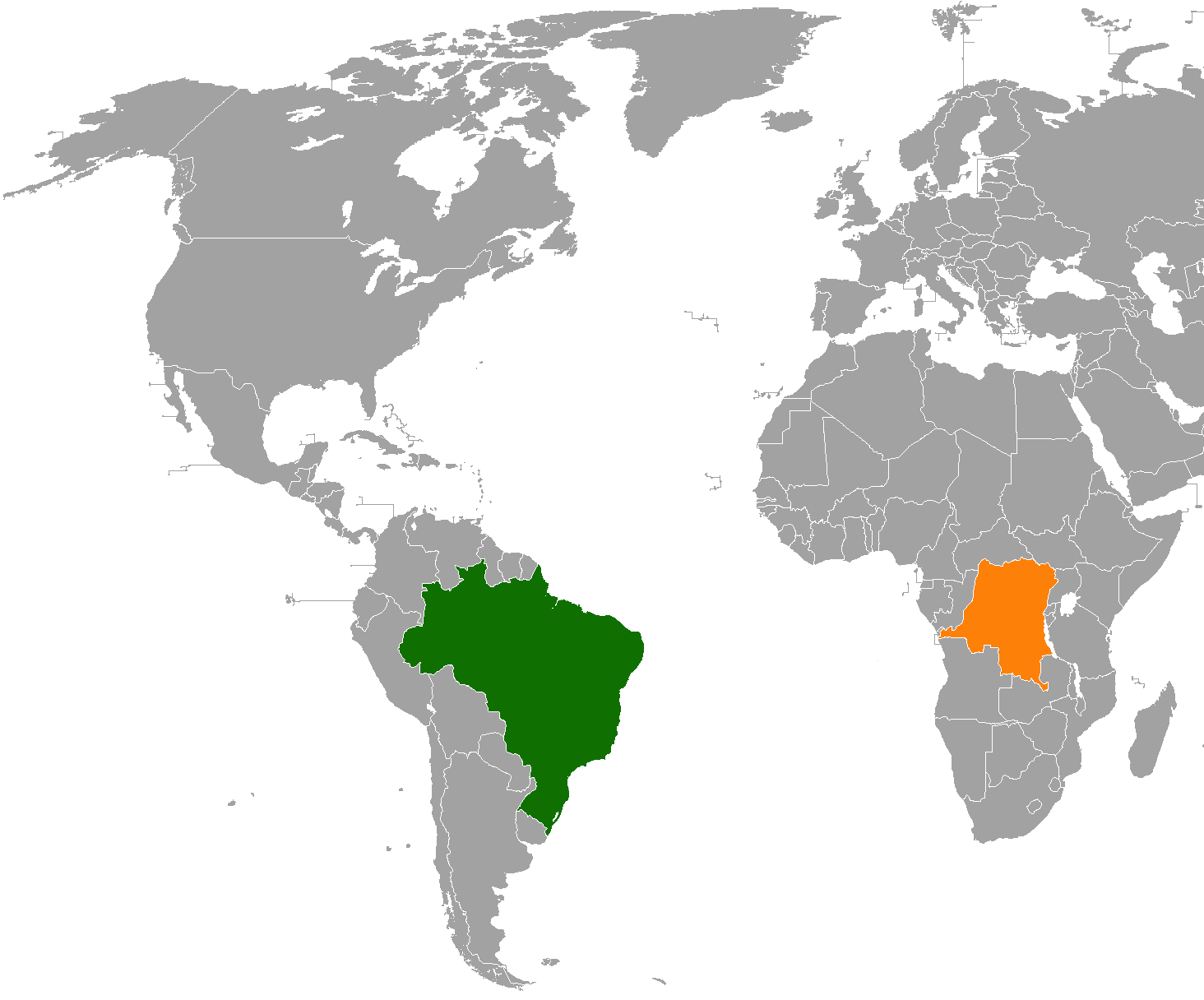
- Brazil: DR Congo

Brazil and the Democratic Republic of the Congo established diplomatic relations in 1968. Both nations are members of the Group of 24, Group of 77 and the United Nations.

== History ==
During the Atlantic slave trade, Portugal transported many African slaves from the Congo to Brazil. In 1960, the DR Congo (at the time known as Zaire) obtained its independence from Belgium. In 1968, Brazil and the DR Congo established diplomatic relations. In 1972, Brazil opened a resident embassy in Kinshasa. In 1974, the DR Congo opened an embassy in Brasília. In 1987, President Mobutu Sese Seko paid an official visit to Brazil. During his visit, an Agreement of Joint Communiqué was signed between both nations.

In 1997, Brazil closed its embassy in Kinshasa, however, it was re-opened again in 2004. In 2005, Congolese Vice President, Jean-Pierre Bemba, paid an official visit to Brazil. In 2010, Brazilian Foreign Minister, Celso Amorim, visited Kinshasa. During his visit, Foreign Minister Amorim announced that the Brazilian Government would contribute US$1 million to mechanisms for redress and access to justice for victims of sexual violence in the DR Congo. In April 2013, the United Nations named Brazilian General Carlos Alberto dos Santos Cruz to take command of the United Nations Organization Stabilization Mission in the Democratic Republic of the Congo (MONUSCO).

In 2011, the 3rd Session of the Mixed Commission Brazil-DR Congo took place in Brasília, after a 25-year hiatus since the last meeting; in which bilateral partnerships were relaunched in areas such as agroecology, family farming, training of human resources, science and technology.

In September 2015, Brazilian Foreign Minister, Mauro Vieira, traveled to Kinshasa and met with President Joseph Kabila. While in the country, Foreign Minister Vieira traveled to Goma and held a working meeting with the UN Secretary-General's special representative for the DR Congo and head of the UN Stabilization Mission in the DR Congo, Martin Kobler. Foreign Minister Vieira also met with Brazilian General Carlos Alberto dos Santos Cruz, commander of MONUSCO's Military Force.

In 2018, Brazilian General Elias Martins Filho took command of MONUSCO.

== High-level visits ==
High-level visits from Brazil to the DR Congo

- Foreign Minister Mario Gibson Barbosa (1972)
- Defense Minister Nelson Jobim (2009)
- Foreign Minister Celso Amorim (2010)
- Defense Minister Celso Amorim (2014)
- Foreign Minister Mauro Vieira (2015)

High-level visits from the DR Congo to Brazil

- Foreign Minister Jean Nguza Karl-i-Bond (1973)
- President Mobutu Sese Seko (1987)
- Vice President Jean-Pierre Bemba (2005)
- Foreign Minister Raymond Tshibanda (2011, 2012)
- Minister of the Environment Bavon Mputu Elima (2013)
- Minister of the Economy Jean-Paul Nemoyato Begepole (2014)
- Senator Jean-Claude Mokeni (2015)

== Bilateral agreements ==
Both nations have signed a few bilateral agreements such as an Agreement for Economic, Commercial, Technical, Scientific and Cultural Cooperation (1972); Trade Agreement (1973); Air Transportation Agreement (1973); Agreement of Joint Communiqué (1987); Memorandum of Understanding between the Rio Branco Institute of the Brazilian Ministry of Foreign Affairs and the Congolese Diplomatic Academy of the Ministry of Foreign Affairs (2011); and an Agreement on Sovereign Debt Restructuring (2017).

== Resident diplomatic missions ==
- Brazil has an embassy in Kinshasa.
- DR Congo has an embassy in Brasília.

== See also ==
- Congolese immigration to Brazil
- Afro-Brazilian history
