= Angola–Democratic Republic of the Congo relations =

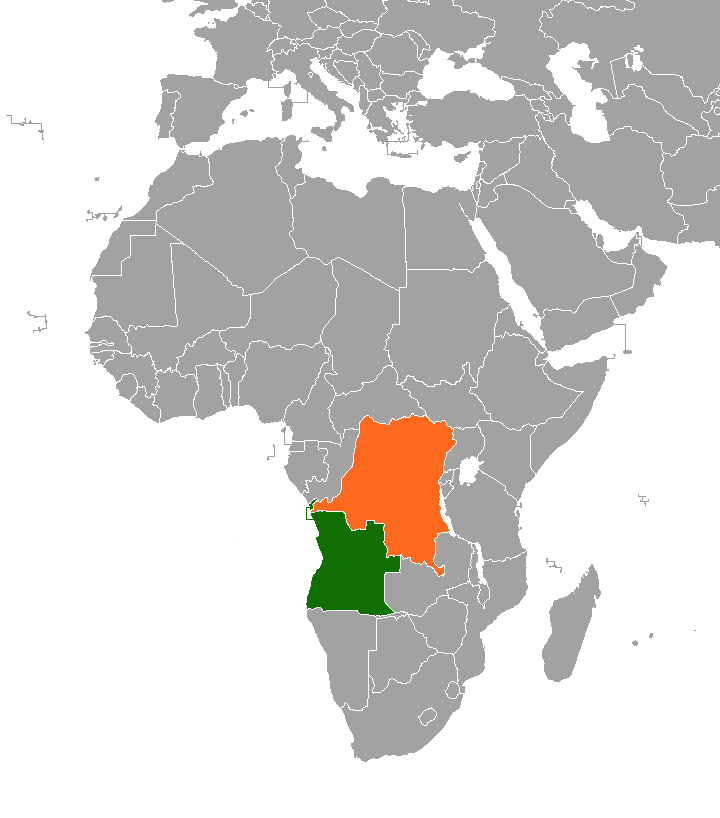
- Angola: DR Congo

Angola–Democratic Republic of the Congo relations refers to the bilateral diplomatic relations between Angola and the Democratic Republic of the Congo. The two countries share a border that is 2,646 km long.

The two nations share a long geographical border and have historically maintained close relations. During the Second Congo War, Angola intervened militarily in support of the government of the Democratic Republic of the Congo.

In the border regions, issues such as the activities of armed groups, illegal mineral extraction, and refugee movements have continued to pose challenges. To address these issues, the two countries have promoted security cooperation and strengthened border management.

Economically, cooperation has taken place in the fields of oil, mineral resources, trade, and infrastructure development. Both countries are also members of the African Union and the Southern African Development Community (SADC), participating in broader regional cooperation initiatives.

== Historical relations ==
=== Pre-Independence ===
The Kingdom of Kongo was located in Central Africa between northern Angola and the western portion of the Democratic Republic of the Congo. In 1482, the Portuguese led by Diogo Cão arrived in Africa where he explored the extreme north-western coast, the city of São Paulo da Assumpção de Loanda (present-day Luanda) was founded in 1576 of what will become known as Portuguese Angola as they brought one hundred families of settlers and four hundred soldiers of the Portuguese Empire. Most of the Portuguese community lived within the fort, not long after Pedro Álvares Cabral discovered Brazil in 1500, of which centuries later, with Brazil became the world's leading sugar exporter during the 17th century. The soldier and officer Estácio de Sá founded the city of Rio de Janeiro where it became known as "Cidade dos Brasileiros" (meaning City of Brazilians) From 1600 to 1650, sugar accounted for 95 percent of Brazil's exports, and slave labor was relied heavily upon to provide the workforce to maintain these export earnings. It is estimated that 560,000 Central African slaves from Angola arrived in Brazil during the 17th century in addition to the indigenous slave labor that was provided by the bandeiras. The Belgian Revolution had led Belgium to become independent from the Dutch in 1830 as the world's newest kingdom in Europe. In 1879, the American explorer Henry Morton Stanley who made his efforts, including establishing treaties with local leaders and building a railroad, facilitated the creation of the Congo Free State, a personal holding of the Belgian king Leopold II after his establishment by the guests in Brussels as an appointment with the Association Internationale du Congo on behalf of Germany's Otto von Bismarck from Berlin that drew the African continent as the Scramble for Africa for the European colonial powers. In 1916, the Belgian officer Charles Tombeur had led the Battle of Tabora as part of the Tabora offensive during the First World War with Ruanda-Urundi liberated from the Germans in East Africa by the Belgians from the Congo border and mandated into Class B Mandate until 1962.

=== Post-Independence ===
The Congo achieved independence from Belgium on 30 June 1960, followed by the Angolan War of Independence on 11 November 1975 against the Portuguese occupiers which led Angola free after 493 years of brutal occupation. Historically, Angola has been closely involved in Congolese politics, taking part in the 1997 war to oust the dictator Mobutu Sese Seko from power in Zaire and changed its original name back to the Congo. It then intervened during the Second Congo War in 1998 on the side of the new administration under Laurent-Désiré Kabila. Since the end of the conflict, the Angolan government remained an ally of President Joseph Kabila and supported him militarily. However, Angola's focus on stability in the DRC, compared to Kabila's attempts to remain in power and postponement of elections since the end of his term in December 2016, leading to mass protests, have led to a cooling in relations between the two countries.

== Political relations ==
Since 2003, Angola has regularly conducted mass expulsions of irregular Congolese immigrants. In 2012, Human Rights Watch reported upon the "degrading and inhuman treatment", including sexual violence, of Congolese migrants during state-sanctioned expulsions. These claims centred on expulsions from the Angolan provinces of Cabinda and Lunda Norte to the Congolese provinces of Kongo Central and Kasaï-Occidental.

About 30,000 Congolese refugees fleeing from violence in the Kasaï-Central region of the DRC due to the Kamwina Nsapu rebellion that began in August 2016 entered Angola. By late 2017, several thousand returned to Congo. In October 2018, about 300,000 Congolese fled Angola, many of them in response to violence in the mining town Lucapa; DRC's foreign minister Léonard She Okitundu summoned Angola's ambassador over the expulsion, demanding a “comprehensive investigation to establish who is responsible for these wrongful acts”.

Angolan President João Lourenço has led mediation efforts between the DRC and Rwanda-backed M23 rebels, organizing peace talks in Luanda. Despite diplomatic efforts, border tensions and disputes over the expulsion of illegal Congolese migrants from Angola occasionally strain relations.

== Economic relations ==
The DRC and Angola both have vast mineral wealth, including diamonds, cobalt, and oil, leading to cross-border trade and, at times, disputes over resource control. Offshore oil disputes have strained relations, with Angola deporting thousands of Congolese migrants working illegally in its mining and diamond sectors.

== Military relations ==
In 2025, Angola participated in the Southern African Development Community (SADC) military mission to stabilize eastern DRC against armed groups. As M23 rebels advanced in early 2025, SADC announced a phased troop withdrawal. Angola has continued diplomatic efforts to resolve the crisis, hosting peace talks between the DRC government and M23 leaders in Luanda.

== See also ==
- Foreign relations of Angola
- Foreign relations of the Democratic Republic of the Congo
- Mundindi Didi Kilengo
