= Minister of Foreign Affairs (Democratic Republic of the Congo) =

Foreign minister of Congo-Kinshasa

Minister of Foreign Affairs of the Democratic Republic of the Congo (French: Ministre des Affaires étrangères de la République démocratique du Congo) (known as the Republic of the Congo in 1960–71 and the Republic of Zaire in 1971–97) is a government minister in charge of the Ministry of Foreign Affairs of the Democratic Republic of the Congo, responsible for conducting foreign relations of the country.

The following is a list of foreign ministers of the Democratic Republic of the Congo since its founding in 1960:

No.	Name (Birth–Death)	Portrait	Tenure
Republic of the Congo (1960–1971)
1	Justin Marie Bomboko (1928–2014)		1960–1963
2	Auguste Mabika-Kalanda (1932–1995)		1963
3	Cyrille Adoula (1921–1978)		1963–1964
4	Moïse Tshombe (1919–1969)		1964–1965
	Thomas Kanza (1934–2004) (Note: Rebel government at Stanleyville, during the Congo Crisis.)		1964–1965
5	Cléophas Kamitatu (1931–2008)		1965
(1)	Justin Marie Bomboko (1928–2014)		1965–1969
(3)	Cyrille Adoula (1921–1978)		1969–1970
6	Mario-Philippe Losembe (1933–2026)		1970–1971
Republic of Zaire (1971–1997)
(6)	Losembe Batwanyele (1933–2026) (Note: Previously named Mario-Philippe Losembe; changed name in 1972 due to the policy of Zairianisation.)		1971–1972
7	Jean Nguza Karl-i-Bond (1938–2003)		1972–1974
8	Umba di Lutete (b. 1939)		1974–1975
9	Mandungu Bula Nyati (1935–2000)		1975–1976
(7)	Jean Nguza Karl-i-Bond (1938–2003)		1976–1977
(8)	Umba di Lutete (b. 1939)		1977–1979
(7)	Jean Nguza Karl-i-Bond (1938–2003)		1979–1980
10	Inonga Lokongo L'Ome (1939–1991)		1980–1981
(1)	Bomboko Lokumba (1928–2014) (Note: Previously named Justin Marie Bomboko; changed name due to the policy of Zairianisation.)		1981
11	Yoka Mangono (1939–1995)		1981–1982
12	Gérard Kamanda wa Kamanda (1940–2016)		1982–1983
(8)	Umba di Lutete (b. 1939)		1983–1985
13	Edouard Mokolo wa Mpombo (b. 1944)		1985–1986
(9)	Mandungu Bula Nyati (1935–2000)		1986
14	Léon Kengo wa Dondo (b. 1935)		1986–1987
15	Ekila Liyonda (1948–2006)		1987–1988
(7)	Jean Nguza Karl-i-Bond (1938–2003)		1988–1990
16	Mushobekwa Kalimba wa Katana (1943–2004)		1990–1991
(10)	Inonga Lokongo L'Ome (1939–1991)		1991
17	Ipoto Eyebu Bakand'Asi (b. 1933)		1991
18	Buketi Bukayi		1991
19	Bagbeni Adeito Nzengeya (1941–2020)		1991–1992
20	Pierre Lumbi (1950–2020)		1992–1993
21	Mpinga Kasenda (1937–1994)		1993–1994
22	Lunda Bululu (b. 1942)		1994–1995
(12)	Gérard Kamanda wa Kamanda (1940–2016)		1995–1996
23	Jean-Marie Kititwa (1929–2000)		1996
(12)	Gérard Kamanda wa Kamanda (1940–2016)		1996–1997
Democratic Republic of the Congo (1997–present)
24	Bizima Karaha (b. 1968)		1997–1998
25	Jean-Charles Okoto (b. 1955)		1998–1999
26	Abdoulaye Yerodia Ndombasi (1933–2019)		1999–2000
27	Léonard She Okitundu (b. 1946)		2000–2003
28	Antoine Ghonda (b. 1965)		2003–2004
29	Raymond Ramazani Baya (1943–2019)		2004–2007
30	Antipas Mbusa (b. 1959)		2007–2008
31	Alexis Thambwe Mwamba (b. 1943)		2008–2012
32	Raymond Tshibanda (b. 1950)		2012–2016
(27)	Léonard She Okitundu (b. 1946)		2016–2019
—	Alexis Thambwe Mwamba (b. 1943) Acting Minister		2019
—	Franck Mwe di Malila (b. 1968) Acting Minister		2019
33	Marie Tumba Nzeza (b. 1950)		2019–2021
34	Christophe Lutundula (b. 1952)		2021–2024
35	Thérèse Kayikwamba Wagner (b. 1983)		2024–present
