= Democratic Republic of the Congo–Russia relations =

- DR Congo: Russia

Democratic Republic of the Congo–Russia relations (French: Relations entre la république démocratique du Congo et la Russie, Russian: Российско-конголезские отношения) are the bilateral foreign relations between the Democratic Republic of the Congo and Russia. The Democratic Republic of the Congo has an embassy in Moscow and an honorary consulate in Yekaterinburg. Russia has an embassy in Kinshasa. The relations between the two countries were established on July 7, 1960, and restored since November 30, 1967.

== Historical context ==
Soviet Union–Zaire relations
- Soviet Union: Zaire

During the Cold War, relations with the Soviet Union and Zaire, renamed from the Democratic Republic of the Congo, were frosty. Mobutu Sese Seko, a staunch anticommunist who seized power in 1965, was not anxious to recognize the Soviets; he remembered well their support, albeit mostly vocal, of Lumumba and the Simba rebels. However, to project a non-aligned image, DRC did renew ties in 1967; the first Soviet ambassador arrived and presented his credentials in 1968 (Mobutu did, however, join the U.S. in condemning the Soviet invasion of Czechoslovakia that year). Despite this, in 1970, Zaire expelled four Soviet diplomats for carrying out "subversive activities," and in 1971, twenty Soviet officials were declared persona non grata for allegedly instigating student demonstrations at Lovanium University.

Relations cooled further in 1975, when the two countries found themselves opposing different sides in the Angolan Civil War. This had a dramatic effect on Zairian foreign policy for the next decade; bereft of Mobutu's claim to African leadership (Mobutu was one of the few leaders who denied the Marxist government of Angola recognition), Mobutu turned increasingly to the U.S. and its allies, adopting pro-American stances on such issues as the Soviet invasion of Afghanistan, Israel's position in international organizations, etc.

Mobutu condemned the Soviet invasion of Afghanistan in 1979, and in 1980, his was the first African nation to join the United States in boycotting the Summer Olympics in Moscow. Throughout the 1980s, he remained consistently anti-Soviet, and found himself opposing pro-Soviet countries such as Libya and Angola (he covertly supported the UNITA rebels); in the mid-1980s, he described Zaire as being surrounded by a "red belt" of communist and socialist states allied to the Soviet Union. In 1987, Mobutu expelled several Soviet diplomats after accusing them of spying on the country's military and trade unions. In response the Soviet Union expelled Zairian Consular Emany Mata Likambe and two technical workers.

The decline and eventual fall of the Soviet Union and the Eastern Bloc as a whole had disastrous repercussions for Mobutu. His anti-Soviet stance was the main justification for Western aid; without it, there was no longer any reason to support him. Western countries began calling for him to introduce democracy and improve human rights, leaving Zaire virtually isolated from international affairs.

The DRC and Russia have positive relations after the end of the Cold War. Sergei Lavrov met with the Foreign Minister of the DRC in April 2009, stating that Russia will increase cooperation with DR Congo. In 2010, thirty officers of the Armed Forces of the Democratic Republic of the Congo (FARDC) were awarded scholarships to study in Russian military academies. This is part of a bigger effort to improve the FARDC by Russia. In December 2014, a Russian language school opened in Kinshasa for the Congolese Diplomatic Academy. Throughout 2013 and 2014, small groups of Congolese National Police attended two-month training stints in Russia.

On July 27, 2023, the Democratic Republic of Congo and Russia signed a reciprocal visa exemption protocol for holders of diplomatic and service passports on the sidelines of the Russia-Africa summit in St Petersburg.

== Notable people ==
- Moïse Kabaku Mutshail, Congolese diplomat

== See also ==
- Foreign relations of the Democratic Republic of the Congo
- Foreign relations of Russia
- Foreign policy of the Mobutu Sese Seko administration
