= Azerbaijan–Democratic Republic of the Congo relations =

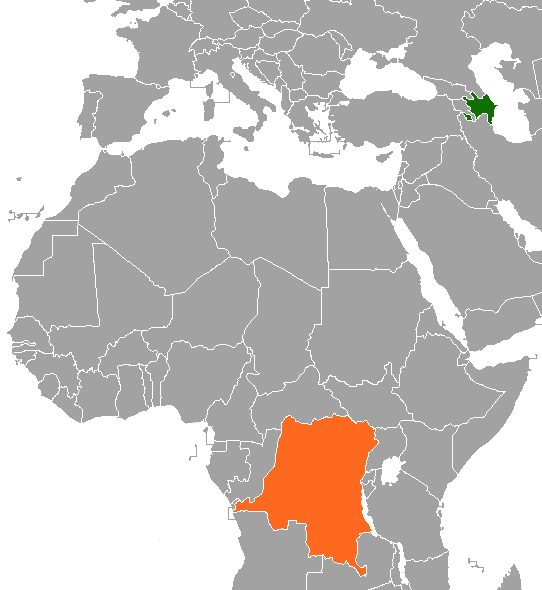

- Azerbaijan: DR Congo

Bilateral relations exist between Azerbaijan and the Democratic Republic of the Congo in diplomatic, socio-economic, military and other spheres. Neither country has a resident ambassador.

== Diplomatic relations ==
On September 23, 2011, Azerbaijani foreign Minister Elmar Mammadyarov held an official meeting with Congolese Foreign Minister Alexis Tambwe Mwamba, during which the parties signed a joint communique on the establishment of diplomatic relations between the countries.

== High-level visits ==
The Congo's Deputy Prime Minister and Minister of Foreign Affairs Leonard She Okitundu paid a working visit to Azerbaijan to attend the Ministerial Conference of the Non-Aligned Movement on April 4–6, 2018.

== Economic cooperation ==
According to UN statistics for 2017, the volume of Azerbaijan's exports to the Congo amounted to 92610 US dollars.

According to UN statistics for 2018, the volume of Congo's exports to Azerbaijan amounted to about 50,700 US dollars.

According to UN statistics for 2019, the volume of Congo's exports to Azerbaijan amounted to 60100 US dollars.

There are several regional energy projects planned for the future.

== Military-technical cooperation ==
In September 2016, Azerbaijan exported 10 upgraded BTR-70 armored personnel carriers to the Congo.

The two countries cooperate in the field of defense industry.

== International cooperation ==
In 2012, a Committee on the Democratic Republic of the Congo was established in the United Nations Security Council (UN). The committee is chaired by Azerbaijan. The vice-presidents are Morocco and Pakistan.

== See also ==
- Foreign relations of Azerbaijan
- Foreign relations of the Democratic Republic of the Congo
