= Foreign relations of the Democratic Republic of the Congo =

The Democratic Republic of Congo (abbreviated as DRC) formerly known as Zaire is a country located in central Africa. Its the second largest country in Africa and the 11th in the world.

Its location in the center of Africa has made the Democratic Republic of the Congo (at one time known as Zaire) a key player in the region since independence. Because of its size, mineral wealth, and strategic location, Zaire was able to capitalize on Cold War tensions to garner support from the West. In the early 1990s, however, with the end of the Cold War and in the face of growing evidence of human rights abuses, Western support waned as pressure for internal reform increased.

The Democratic Republic of the Congo is in the grip of a civil war that has drawn in military forces from neighboring states, with Ugandan, Burundian, and Rwandan forces helping the rebel movement that occupies much of the eastern portion of the state.

One problem is the continuing theft of mineral resources, such as coltan, by occupying forces. One estimate suggests the Rwandan army made $350 million in 48 months from the sale of coltan. Multiple sources indicate that Rwandan coltan is sourced illegally from the DRC. Not only can the DRC not make any money from its mineral wealth, due to its inability to tax anything in rebel-held areas, but the wealth is also used itself to finance insurgent activities.

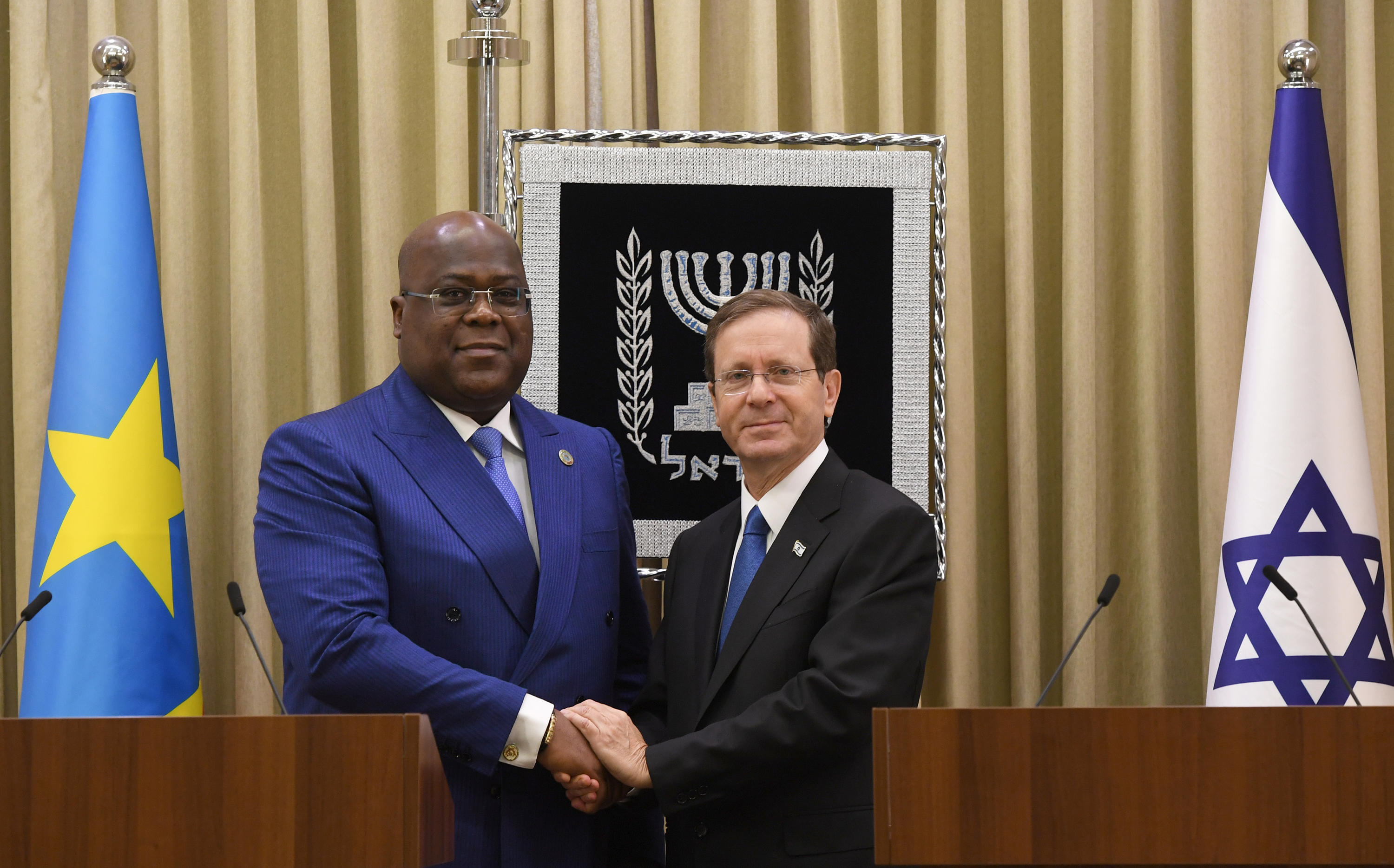
The Democratic Republic of the Congo's President Félix Tshisekedi with Israeli President Isaac Herzog in Jerusalem, Israel, October 2021

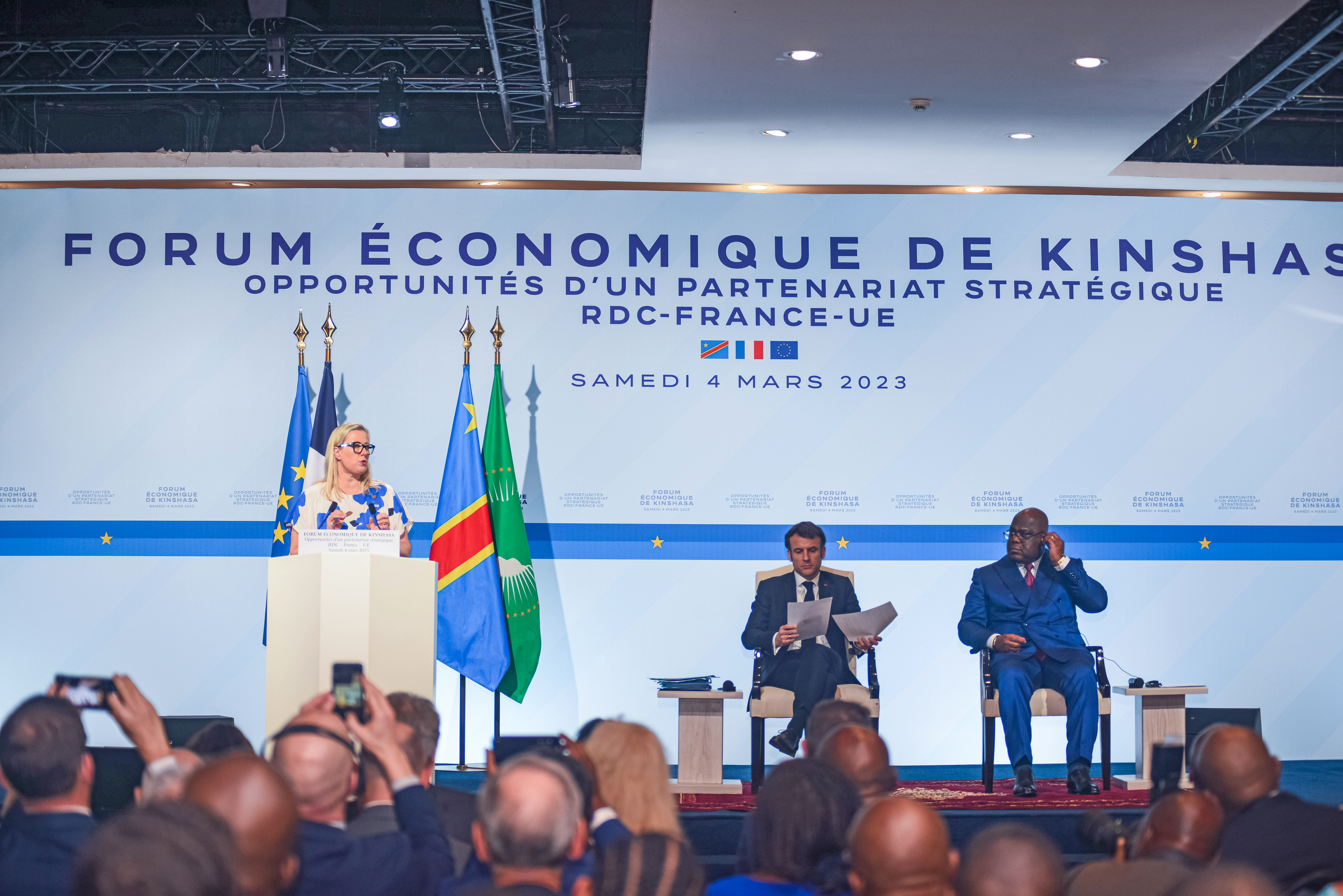
Tshisekedi, French President Emmanuel Macron and European Commissioner Jutta Urpilainen in Kinshasa, 4 March 2023

Troops from Zimbabwe, Angola, Namibia, Chad, and Sudan support the Kinshasa regime.

Furthermore, relations with surrounding countries have often been driven by security concerns. Intricate and interlocking alliances have often characterized regional relations. Conflicts in Sudan, Uganda, Angola, Rwanda, and Burundi have at various times created bilateral and regional tensions. The current crisis in DRC has its roots both in the use of The Congo as a base by various insurgency groups attacking neighboring countries and in the absence of a broad-based political system in the Congo.

The Democratic Republic of the Congo is also a member of the International Criminal Court with a Bilateral Immunity Agreement of protection for the U.S.-military (as covered under Article 98).

== Disputes – international ==
The Democratic Republic of the Congo is in the grip of a civil war that has drawn in military forces from neighboring states, with Uganda and Rwanda supporting the rebel movements that occupy much of the eastern portion of the state – Tutsi, Hutu, Lendu, Hema and other conflicting ethnic groups, political rebels, and various government forces continue fighting in Great Lakes region, transcending the boundaries of Burundi, Democratic Republic of the Congo, Rwanda, and Uganda – heads of the Great Lakes states pledge to end conflict, but localized violence continues despite UN peacekeeping efforts; most of the Congo River boundary with the Republic of the Congo is indefinite (no agreement has been reached on the division of the river or its islands, except in the Pool Malebo/Stanley Pool area).

On December 19, 2005, the International Court of Justice found against Uganda, in a case brought by the Democratic Republic of the Congo, for illegal invasion of its territory, and violation of human rights.

== Illicit drugs ==
The DRC has some illicit production of cannabis, mostly for domestic consumption. While rampant corruption and inadequate supervision leaves the banking system vulnerable to money laundering, the lack of a well-developed financial system limits the country's utility as a money-laundering center.

== Diplomatic relations ==
List of Countries which the Democratic Republic of the Congo maintains diplomatic relations with:

#	Country	Date
1	Czech Republic	30 June 1960
2	Egypt	30 June 1960
3	France	30 June 1960
4	Germany	30 June 1960
5	Israel	30 June 1960
6	Japan	30 June 1960
7	Liberia	30 June 1960
8	Poland	30 June 1960
9	United States	30 June 1960
10	Belgium	2 July 1960
11	Portugal	7 July 1960
12	Russia	7 July 1960
13	United Kingdom	7 July 1960
14	Ghana	15 July 1960
15	Italy	21 July 1960
16	Netherlands	25 July 1960
17	Serbia	2 August 1960
18	Sudan	9 August 1960
19	India	August 1960
20	Tunisia	1960
21	Bulgaria	22 February 1961
22	Vietnam	13 April 1961
23	Benin	22 August 1961
24	Mali	23 November 1961
25	Canada	12 June 1962
26	Denmark	1 August 1962
27	Switzerland	12 October 1962
28	Sweden	October 1962
29	Uganda	4 March 1963
30	South Korea	1 April 1963
31	Senegal	June 1963
32	Algeria	August 1963
33	Burundi	1963
34	Ethiopia	1963
35	Indonesia	1963
36	Tanzania	30 May 1964
37	Zambia	24 October 1964
38	Spain	3 November 1964
39	Nigeria	27 November 1964
40	Cameroon	29 June 1965
41	Luxembourg	7 September 1965
42	Republic of the Congo	5 November 1965
43	Central African Republic	February 1966
—	Rwanda (suspended)	August 1966
44	Greece	15 June 1966
45	Romania	14 October 1966
46	Ivory Coast	25 October 1966
47	Guinea	1966
48	Kenya	1966
49	Brazil	21 June 1968
50	Morocco	27 September 1968
51	Thailand	14 February 1969
52	Chad	2 April 1969
53	Libya	June 1969
54	Norway	27 September 1969
55	Gabon	28 January 1970
56	Finland	3 April 1970
57	Togo	13 July 1970
58	Niger	12 August 1971
59	Chile	31 March 1972
60	Mauritania	May 1972
61	Lebanon	June 1972
62	Austria	24 July 1972
63	Argentina	4 October 1972
64	Cambodia	5 October 1972
65	China	24 November 1972
66	North Korea	12 December 1972
67	Somalia	28 January 1973
68	Iran	11 February 1973
69	Hungary	16 June 1973
70	Saudi Arabia	13 September 1973
71	Cuba	11 April 1974
72	Guinea Bissau	19 July 1974
73	Madagascar	26 July 1974
74	Sierra Leone	20 January 1975
75	Mongolia	4 February 1975
76	Mexico	31 July 1975
77	Peru	3 August 1975
78	Turkey	22 October 1975
79	Mauritius	19 June 1976
80	Mozambique	30 July 1976
—	Holy See	31 January 1977
81	Sri Lanka	13 May 1978
82	Eswatini	June 1978
83	Angola	29 July 1978
84	Oman	1978
85	Ecuador	29 February 1980
86	Bahrain	3 June 1980
87	Lesotho	6 November 1980
88	Malawi	November 1980
89	Zimbabwe	1980
90	Gambia	7 January 1981
91	Singapore	23 March 1984
92	Uruguay	31 March 1984
93	San Marino	14 May 1984
—	Sovereign Military Order of Malta	1984
94	Haiti	1 October 1986
95	Nicaragua	16 April 1987
96	Namibia	4 October 1990
97	Kuwait	27 November 1990
98	South Africa	30 September 1992
99	Slovakia	18 February 1993
100	Bosnia and Herzegovina	20 March 1995
101	Malaysia	1997
102	Ukraine	13 April 1999
103	North Macedonia	27 September 1999
104	Philippines	9 January 2000
105	Cyprus	20 June 2000
106	Ireland	2000
107	Jordan	16 September 2002
108	Venezuela	3 May 2005
109	Nepal	22 September 2006
110	Iceland	23 February 2007
111	Djibouti	26 March 2007
112	Dominican Republic	26 September 2007
113	Croatia	19 October 2007
114	Montenegro	22 September 2010
115	Belarus	16 November 2010
116	Georgia	14 January 2011
117	Latvia	14 January 2011
118	Australia	18 January 2011
119	Slovenia	25 February 2011
120	Azerbaijan	23 September 2011
121	South Sudan	4 March 2013
122	Cape Verde	14 May 2014
123	Armenia	11 October 2015
124	United Arab Emirates	1 November 2017
125	Estonia	3 July 2018
126	Monaco	5 July 2018
127	Qatar	6 November 2019
128	Kazakhstan	2022
129	Botswana	9 February 2023
130	Andorra	23 February 2026
131	Kyrgyzstan	24 February 2026
132	Lithuania	24 September 2026
133	Bangladesh	Unknown
134	Equatorial Guinea	Unknown
135	Iraq	Unknown
136	Pakistan	Unknown
137	Seychelles	Unknown

== Bilateral relations ==
=== Africa ===
Country	Formal Relations Began	Notes
Angola	29 July 1978	Both countries established diplomatic relations on 29 July 1978 See Angola–Democratic Republic of the Congo relations: Angola has an embassy in Kinshasa.; DR Congo has an embassy in Luanda.
Benin	1961	Both countries established diplomatic relations in 1961 when has been accredited Mr. Paul Fabo as Chargé d'Affaires of Dahomey to Leopoldville (Kinshasa) (1961–1963) and later ambassador to DRC (Zaire) (1963–1973).
Republic of the Congo		See Democratic Republic of the Congo–Republic of the Congo relations: Congo has an embassy in Kinshasa.; DR Congo has an embassy in Brazzaville.
Kenya		See Democratic Republic of the Congo–Kenya relations: DR Congo has an embassy in Nairobi.; Kenya has an embassy in Kinshasa.
Namibia	4 October 1990	See Democratic Republic of the Congo-Namibia relations Both countries established diplomatic relations on 4 October 1990.: DR Congo has an embassy in Windhoek.; Namibia has an embassy in Kinshasa.
Rwanda	February 1969; Relations severed 26 January 2025	See Democratic Republic of the Congo–Rwanda relations Rwandan President Paul Kagame met with the Democratic Republic of the Congo's President Joseph Kabila in Goma on 6 August 2009. It was the first presidential meeting between the two countries for 13 years, with the two countries having come to a disagreement in 1996 following an invasion by Rwanda into eastern Congo, a disagreement which was renewed in 1998 after a further invasion. The pair of presidents spent more than two hours in the company of each other and "reviewed all issues of common interest". Kabila referred to it as "the first giant step forward" in what was referred to as an "all new era". One month previous to the meeting both countries had appointed ambassadors to each other's capitals. In August 2013, Rwanda accused Congolese forces of persistently shelling Congo's territory after a flare-up of fighting in the eastern Congo.: DR Congo has an embassy in Kigali.; Rwanda has an embassy in Kinshasa.
South Africa	30 September 1992	Both countries established diplomatic relations on 30 September 1992: DR Congo has an embassy in Pretoria.; South Africa has an embassy in Kinshasa and a consulate-general in Lubumbashi.
Tanzania	30 May 1964	Both countries established diplomatic relations on 30 May 1964 when Andrew Tibandebage is appointed as Ambassador of Tanganyika to Congo (Leopoldville): DR Congo has an embassy in Dar es Salaam and a consulate-general in Kigoma.; Tanzania has an embassy in Kinshasa.
Togo	14 July 1970	Both countries established diplomatic relations on 14 July 1970 when Congo-Kinshasa's first Ambassador to Togo, Mr. Kondo Belan, presented his credentials to Head of State Etienne Eyadema.
Zambia	24 October 1964	Both countries established diplomatic relations on Zambia's independence 24 October 1964, when Democratic Republic of the Congo has raised its consulate-general in Lusaka to embassy level, and consul Mabita has been promoted to chargé d'affaires: DR Congo has an embassy in Lusaka.; Zambia has an embassy in Kinshasa.

=== Americas ===
Country	Formal Relations Began	Notes
Brazil	21 June 1968	See Brazil–Democratic Republic of the Congo relations Both countries established diplomatic relations on 21 June 1968: Brazil has an embassy in Kinshasa.; DR Congo has an embassy in Brasília.
Canada	12 June 1962	See Canada–Democratic Republic of the Congo relations Both countries established diplomatic relations on 12 June 1962 Canada and the D.R. Congo share full membership in Francophonie. Canada was the D.R. Congo's ninth-largest country donor of official development assistance over 1960–2009, disbursing a total of US$0.89 billion in constant 2008 US dollars, or 2.4% of DRC's total bilateral aid receipts. In 2009, Cdn.$3.3 billion in assets were held by thirteen large-scale and junior Canadian mining companies in the DRC, a ten-fold increase from 2001.: Canada has an embassy in Kinshasa.; DR Congo has an embassy in Ottawa.
Mexico	31 July 1975	See Democratic Republic of the Congo–Mexico relations Both nations established diplomatic relations on 31 July 1975: DR Congo does not have an accreditation to Mexico.; Mexico is accredited to DR Congo from its embassy in Addis Ababa, Ethiopia.
United States	30 June 1960	See Democratic Republic of the Congo-United States relations Both countries established diplomatic relations on 30 June 1960 The United States appointed its current ambassador to the D.R.C. in 2007. The D.R.C. appointed its current ambassador to the United States in 2000. The Congo has been on the State Department's travel advisory list since 1977.: DR Congo has an embassy in Washington, D.C.; United States has an embassy in Kinshasa.
Uruguay	31 March 1984	See Democratic Republic of the Congo–Uruguay relations Both countries established diplomatic relations on 31 March 1984 In December 2021, President Luis Lacalle Pou paid a visit to Bukavu and Goma and visited with Uruguayan soldiers stationed there as part of MONUSCO in Eastern DR Congo.: DR Congo is accredited to Uruguay from its embassy in Buenos Aires, Argentina.; Uruguay is accredited to the DR Congo from its embassy in Pretoria, South Africa.

=== Asia ===
Country	Formal Relations Began	Notes
Azerbaijan	23 September 2011	See Azerbaijan-Democratic Republic of the Congo relations Both countries established diplomatic relations on 23 September 2011
China	24 November 1972	See China-Democratic Republic of the Congo relations Both countries established diplomatic relations on 24 November 1972 China is a large investor in the Democratic Republic of the Congo, primarily in the secondary (manufacturing) and primary (resource extraction) markets.: China has an embassy in Kinshasa.; DR Congo has an embassy in Beijing.
India	August 1960	See Democratic Republic of the Congo–India relations Both countries established diplomatic relations in August 1960 when India had decided to open an embassy in Leopoldville (Kinshasa).: DR Congo has an embassy in New Delhi.; India has an embassy in Kinshasa.
Indonesia	1963	See Democratic Republic of the Congo–Indonesia relations Both countries established diplomatic relations in 1963.
Turkey	22 October 1975	Both countries established diplomatic relations on 22 October 1975: Democratic Republic of Congo has an embassy in Ankara.; Turkey has an embassy in Kinshasa.; Trade volume between the two countries was US$54.7 million in 2019.

=== Europe ===
Country	Formal Relations Began	Notes
Belgium	2 July 1960	See Belgium–Democratic Republic of the Congo relations Both countries established diplomatic relations on 2 July 1960 when establishment of the Belgian diplomatic mission in Leopoldville and Jean Van den Bosch becomes the Belgian ambassador.: Belgium has an embassy in Kinshasa and a consulate-general in Lubumbashi.; DR Congo has an embassy in Brussels and a consulate-general in Antwerp.
Germany	30 June 1960	See Democratic Republic of the Congo–Germany relations Both countries established diplomatic relations on 30 June 1960: DR Congo has an embassy in Berlin.; Germany has an embassy in Kinshasa.
Greece	15 June 1966	See Democratic Republic of the Congo–Greece relations Both countries established diplomatic relations on 15 June 1966 when Ambassador of Democratic Republic of Congo to Greece M. Joseph Kahamba, presented his credentials to King Constantin. Both countries are full members of Francophonie. In July 2009, the Greek government pledged US$500,000 through the UN High Commissioner for Refugees for humanitarian assistance to Congo.: DR Congo has an embassy in Athens.; Greece has an embassy in Kinshasa.
Italy	21 July 1960	See Democratic Republic of the Congo–Italy relations Both countries established diplomatic relations on 21 July 1960 when accredited first Ambassador of Italy to Congo (Leopoldville) Mr. Pietro Franca: DR Congo has an embassy in Rome.; Italy has an embassy in Kinshasa.
Norway	27 September 1969	See Democratic Republic of the Congo–Norway relations Both countries established diplomatic relations on 27 September 1969: DR Congo is accredited to Norway from its embassy in London, United Kingdom.; Norway is accredited to the DR Congo from its embassy in Luanda, Angola.
Portugal	7 July 1960	Both countries established diplomatic relations on 7 July 1960: DR Congo has an embassy in Lisbon.; Portugal has an embassy in Kinshasa.
Russia	7 July 1960	See Democratic Republic of the Congo–Russia relations Both countries established diplomatic relations on 7 July 1960: DR Congo has an embassy in Moscow.; Russia has an embassy in Kinshasa.
Serbia	1961	Both countries established diplomatic relations in 1961: DR Congo has an embassy in Belgrade.; Serbia has an embassy in Kinshasa.
Spain	3 November 1964	See Democratic Republic of the Congo–Spain relations Both countries established diplomatic relations on 3 November 1964: DR Congo has an embassy in Madrid.; Spain has an embassy in Kinshasa.
Sweden	1962	Both countries established diplomatic relations in 1962: DR Congo has an embassy in Stockholm.; Sweden has an embassy in Kinshasa.
United Kingdom	7 July 1960	See Democratic Republic of the Congo–United Kingdom relations British Foreign Secretary James Cleverly with Congolese President Felix Tshisekedi in London, October 2022. Democratic Republic of the Congo established diplomatic relations with the United Kingdom on 7 July 1960.: The Democratic Republic of the Congo maintains an embassy in London.; The United Kingdom is accredited to the Democratic Republic of the Congo through its embassy in Kinshasa.; Both countries share common membership of the International Criminal Court, the United Nations, and the World Trade Organization. Bilaterally the two countries have a Development Partnership.

== See also ==
- List of diplomatic missions in the Democratic Republic of the Congo
