= Democratic Republic of the Congo–Indonesia relations =

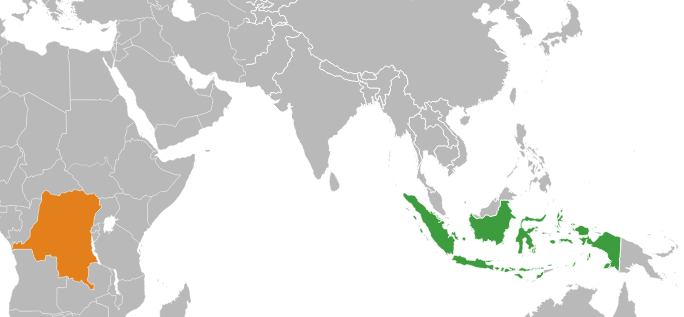
- DR Congo: Indonesia

Diplomatic mission
- None: Resident in Indonesian Embassy, Nairobi

Envoy
- None: Ambassador Witjaksono Adji

The Democratic Republic of the Congo and Indonesia established diplomatic relations in 1963.

== Garuda Contingent operations ==
=== ONUC ===
As part of the United Nations Operation in the Congo (ONUC) in response to the Congo Crisis, two Garuda Contingents were sent to the country. Garuda Contingent II was deployed from September 1960 to May 1961 and comprised 1,074 troops, while Garuda Contingent III was deployed from 1962 to the end of 1963, and comprised 3,457 troops. In recognition of their service, soldiers of both contingents were given Vespa VGLA and VGLB models, collectively known as the Vespa Kongo.

=== MONUSCO ===
Indonesia is a contributor to MONUSCO.

On 22 June 2020, an engineering detachment of 12 Indonesian personnel, escorted by a battalion from Malawi, was ambushed approximately 20 kilometers from Beni, North Kivu while returning to the central operations base by suspected members of the Allied Democratic Forces according to a report by the Indonesian National Armed Forces. Sgt. Maj. Rama Wahyudi was killed during the attack and First Pvt. M. Syafii Makbul was injured, with Minister of Foreign Affairs Retno Marsudi giving her condolences.

== High-level visits ==
High-level visits from Democratic Republic of the Congo to Indonesia

- Minister of Foreign Affairs Léonard She Okitundu (2018)
- Deputy Prime Minister and Minister of Defense Jean-Pierre Bemba (2023)

High-level visits from Indonesia to the Democratic Republic of the Congo

- Coordinating Minister of Maritime and Investment Affairs Luhut Binsar Pandjaitan (2023)

== Gallery ==
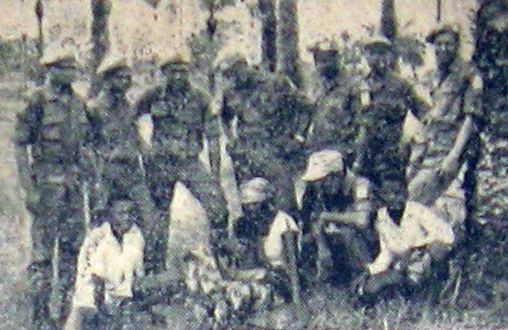
The Garuda Contingent in Congo, 1961

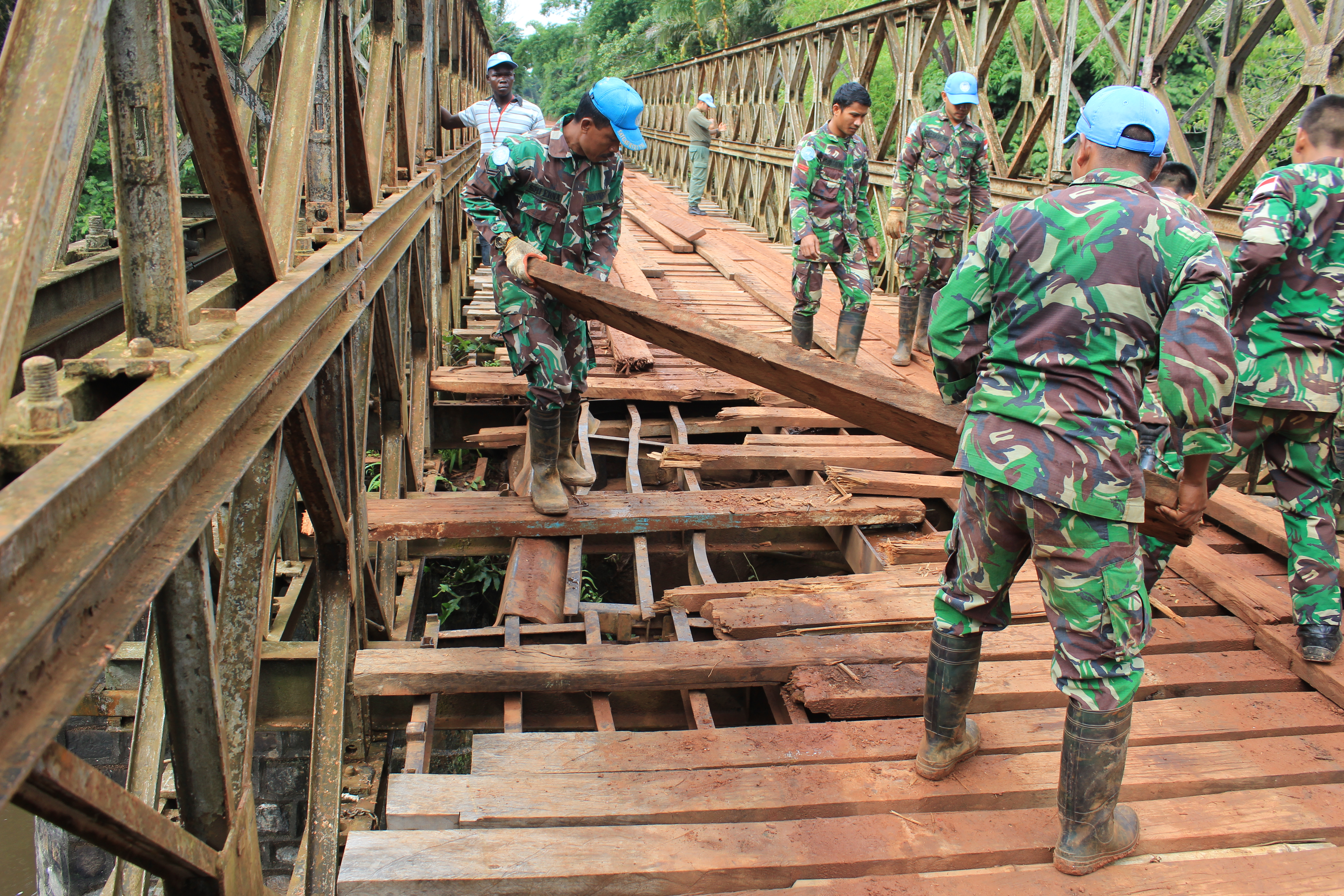
The Indonesian contingent of MONUSCO repairing a bridge near Dungu, 2016

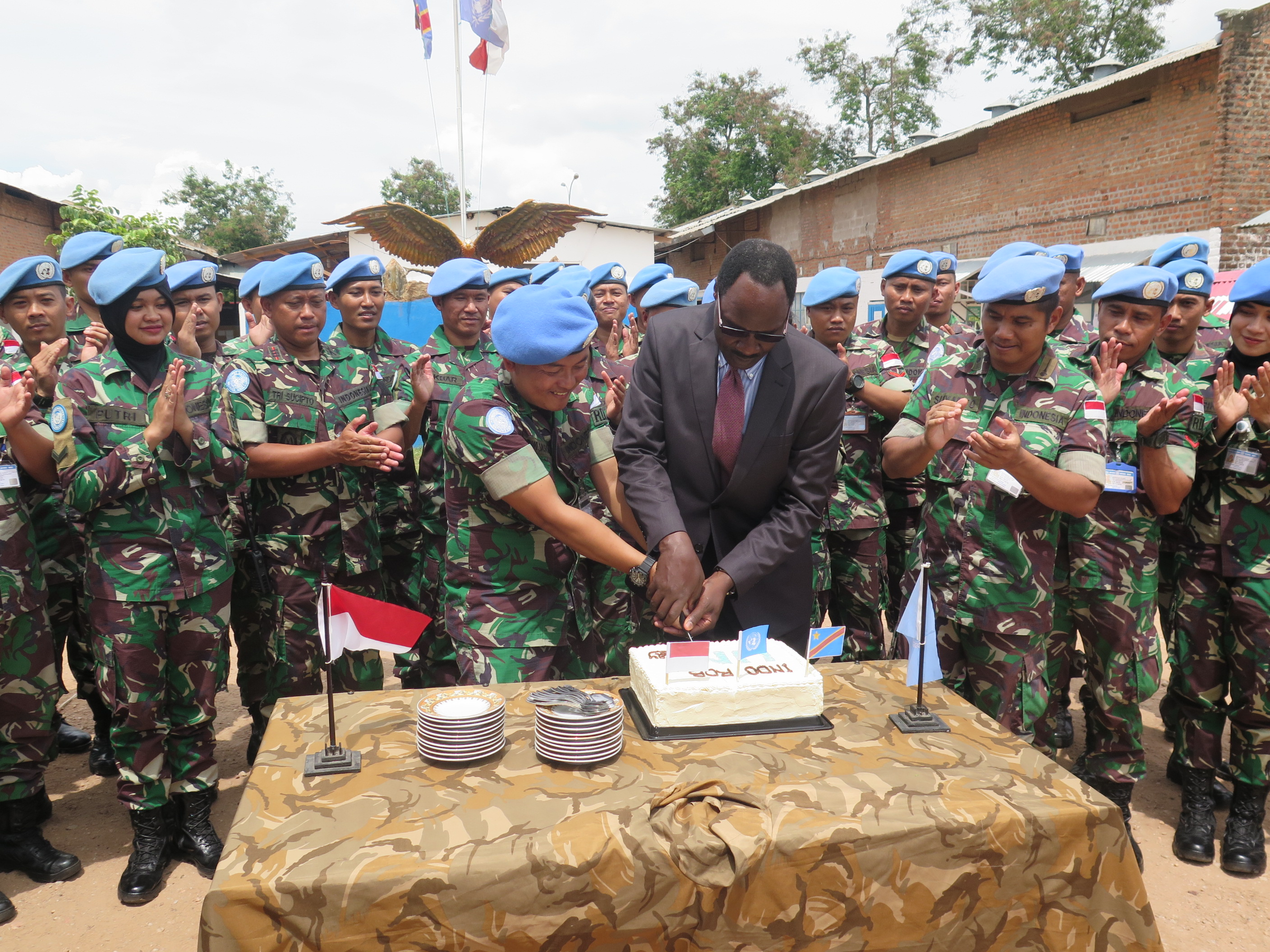
The Indonesian contingent of MONUSCO in Kalemie observing United Nations Day, 2019

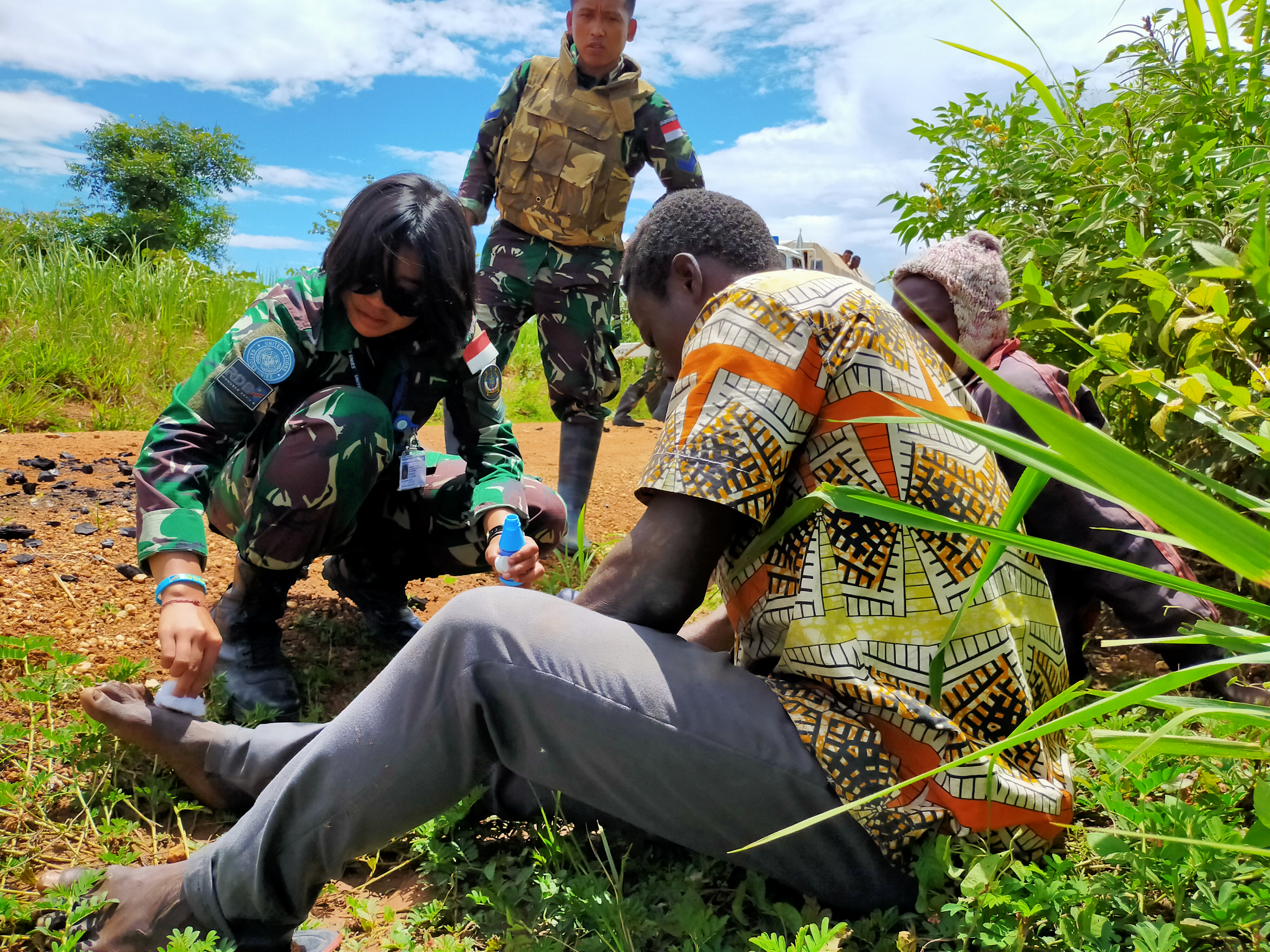
The Indonesian contingent of MONUSCO providing first aid to an injured civilian, 2020
