= Mario-Philippe Losembe =

Congolese politician and diplomat

Mario-Philippe Losembe Batwanyele
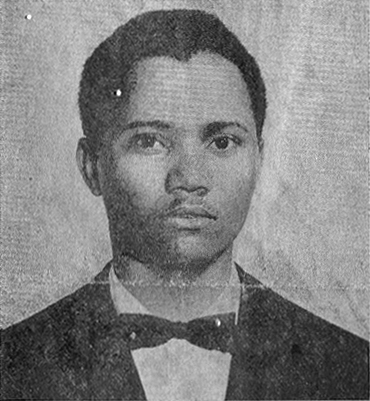
- Losembe in 1960

Democratic Republic of the Congo Senator
- Incumbent
- Assumed office 2007
- President: Joseph Kabila
Executive and diplomatic offices
Minister of Foreign Affairs of the Democratic Republic of the Congo
In office 1970 – February 1972
President	Joseph-Désiré Mobutu
Preceded by	Cyrille Adoula
Minister of Education of the Democratic Republic of the Congo
In office 1969–1970
President	Joseph-Désiré Mobutu
Republic of the Congo Chargé d'Affaires to the United States
In office 1962–1965
President	Joseph Kasa-Vubu
Commissioner-General for Education and Worship of the Republic of the Congo
In office 14 September 1960 – February 1961
President	Joseph Kasa-Vubu
Preceded by

Personal details
- Born: Mario Cardoso; September 29, 1933 Stanleyville, Belgian Congo (Now Kisangani, Congo-Kinshasa)
- Died: September 22, 2026 (aged 92)
- Party: Mouvement National Congolais (?–1960); Forces du Renouveau (2007–)
- Education: Université catholique de Louvain

Mario-Philippe Losembe Batwanyele (born Mario-Philippe Cardoso, 29 September 1933 – 22 September 2026) was a Congolese politician and diplomat. He was serving as the second vice president of the Senate of the Democratic Republic of the Congo.

== Biography ==
Mario-Philippe Losembe Batwanyele was born as Mario-Philippe Cardoso on 29 September 1933 in Stanleyville, Belgian Congo to a Portuguese father and Lokele mother who originated from the Yaokandja sector of the Isangi Territory. He earned his secondary education at St. Joseph's Institute in Léopoldville, graduating in late 1953. The following September he enrolled in the Université catholique de Louvain's Institute of Applied Psychology and Pedagogy. In 1958 he earned a degree in psychology and pedagogy. Losembe subsequently became a research assistant at Lovanium University. He was selected by Patrice Lumumba to lead the Mouvement National Congolais delegation to the economic portion of the Belgo-Congolese Round Table Conference in Brussels from 26 April to 16 May 1960. On his initiative the delegations formed a "Front National" to develop a unified negotiating position. Following the independence of the Congo, Losembe served as secretary-general of the Ministry of Education, though he resigned after only a few weeks in office.

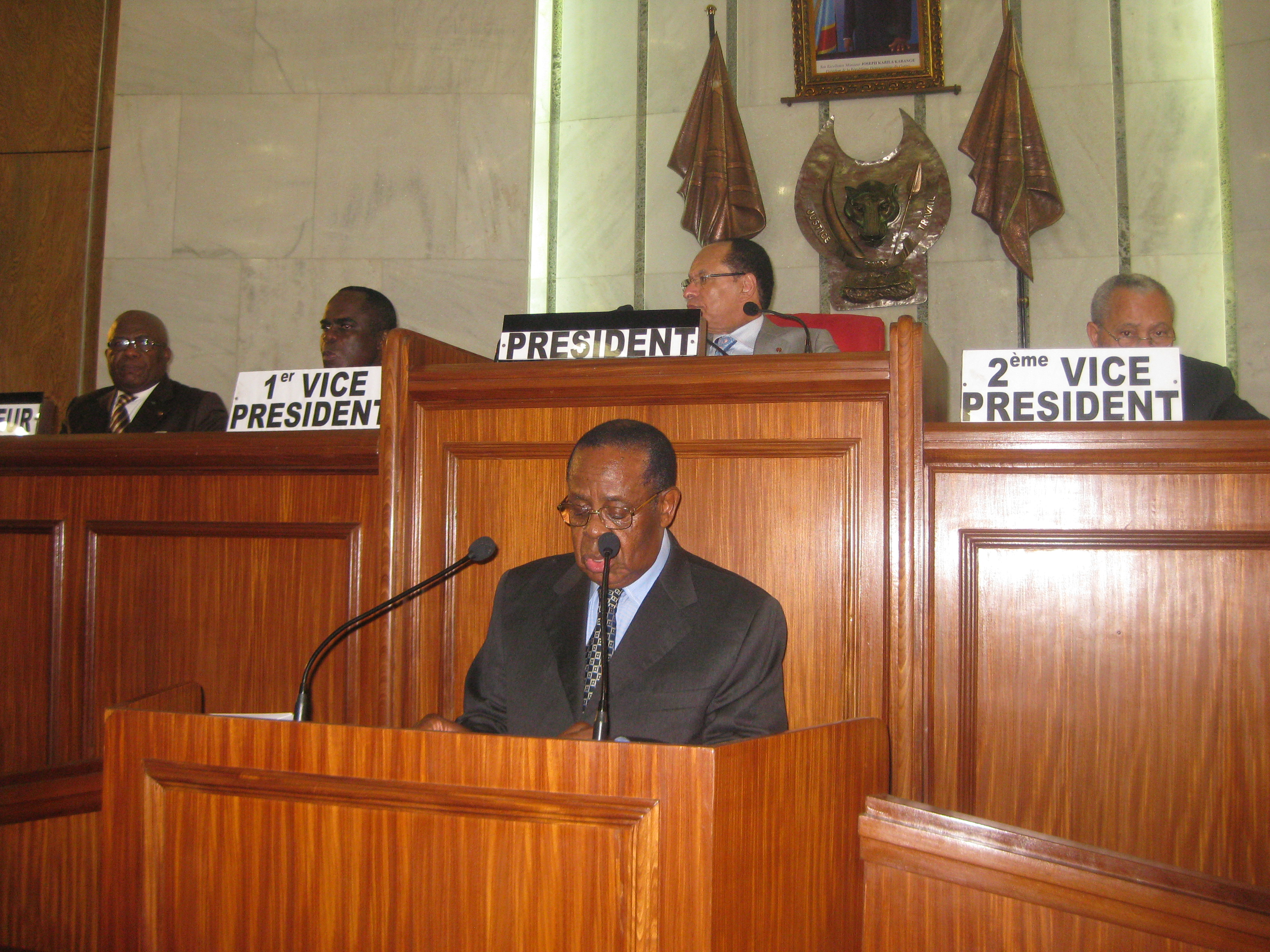
Losembe (far right) sitting in the Senate, 2009

Losembe led the Congolese delegation to the United Nations from 1960 to 1961. He served as chargé d'affaires to the United States from 1962 until 1965. He served as President Joseph-Désiré Mobutu's education minister from 1969 until 1970. He subsequently held the office of foreign minister from 1970 to 1972. That year, Mobutu accused Losembe of embezzling government funds appropriated for the Revolutionary Government of Angola in Exile, causing the latter to shortly thereafter flee to Europe. Losembe returned to the country after a general amnesty was declared in November 1974.

In 2007 he was elected to the Congolese Senate as a member of the Forces du Renouveau party to represent Orientale Province. He was shortly thereafter elected Second Vice President of the Senate by members of the body, 57 to 49.

Losembe is the father of Congolese businessman Michel Losembe.
