= Democratic Republic of the Congo–United Kingdom relations =

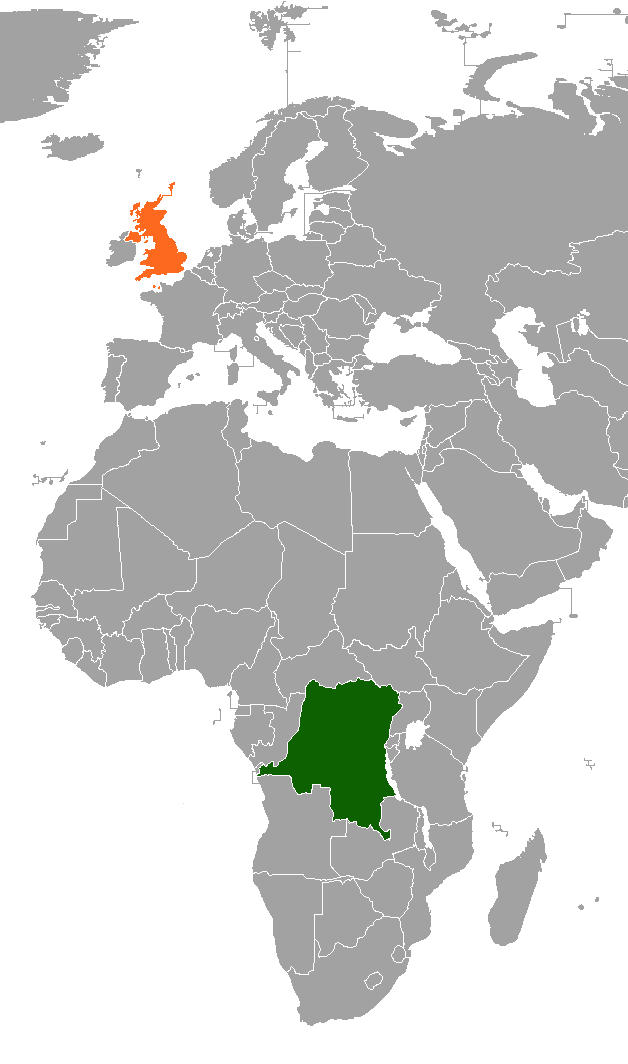

- DR Congo: United Kingdom

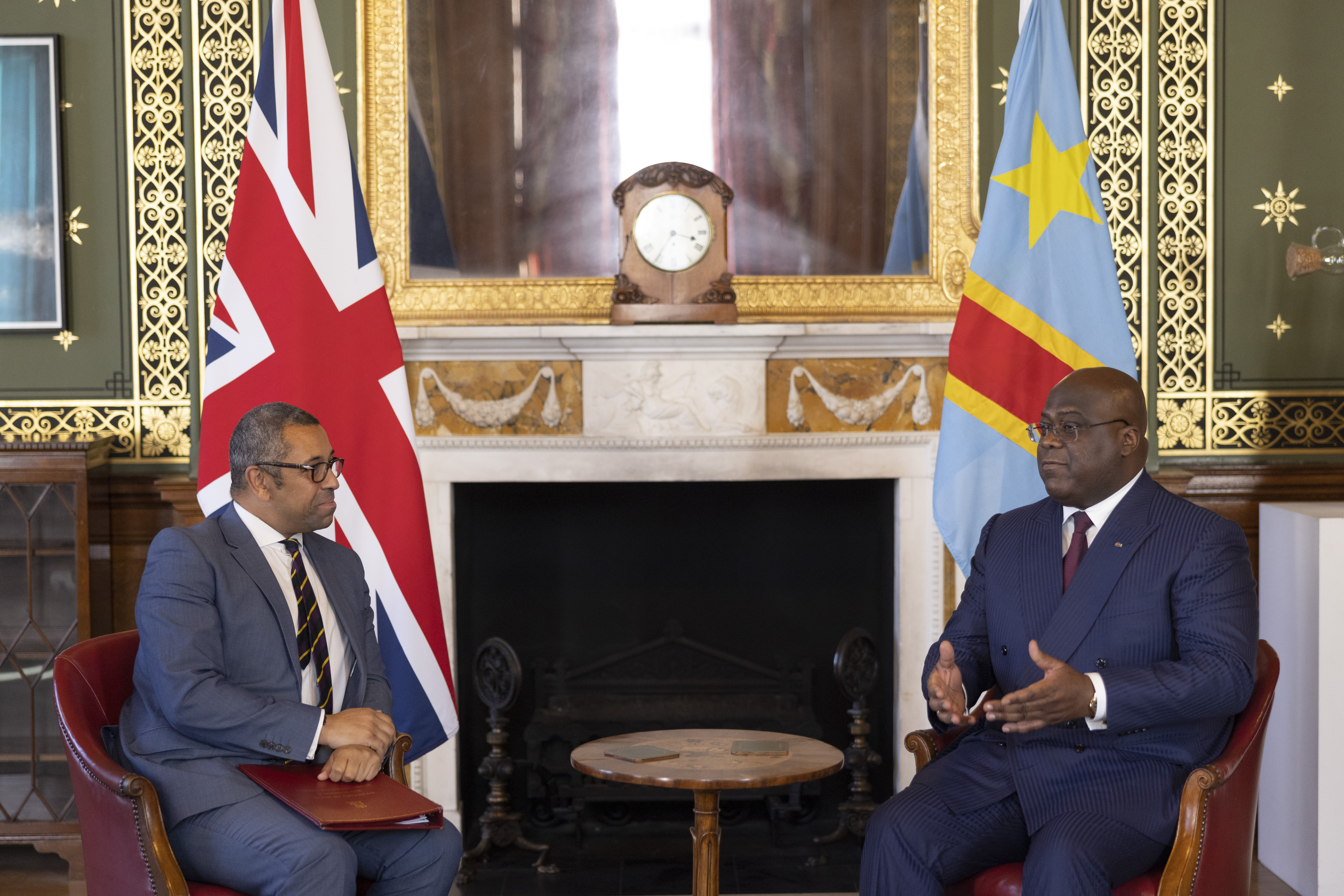
British Foreign Secretary James Cleverly with Congolese President Felix Tshisekedi in London, October 2022.

Democratic Republic of the Congo–United Kingdom relations encompass the diplomatic, economic, and historical interactions between the Democratic Republic of the Congo and the United Kingdom of Great Britain and Northern Ireland.

Both countries share common membership of the International Criminal Court, the United Nations, and the World Trade Organization. Bilaterally the two countries have a Development Partnership.

== History ==
Along with the United States the United Kingdom was a supporter of the Mobutu Sese Seko regime in Zaire due to the regime's anti-communist stance.

== Development and Economic relations ==
The Democratic Republic of the Congo is a recipient of UK Aid, in 2014 the Department for International Development spent £162.2 million on programmes in the Democratic Republic of the Congo.

== Diplomatic relations ==
The United Kingdom established its first Diplomatic mission with the Congo Free State in 1902 when a British Consulate was built in the then capital Boma. A vice-consulate later opened in Léopoldville in 1906. In 1923 Léopoldville was proclaimed the capital of the Belgian Congo and in 1930 the British Consulate in Boma closed and the vice-consulate in Léopoldville became the consulate.

- The Democratic Republic of the Congo maintains an embassy in London.
- The United Kingdom is accredited to the Democratic Republic of the Congo through its embassy in Kinshasa.

President Mobutu made a state visit to the United Kingdom in December 1973.

== See also ==
- Foreign relations of the Democratic Republic of the Congo
- Foreign relations of the United Kingdom
