= Democratic Republic of the Congo–Italy relations =

- DR Congo: Italy

Democratic Republic of the Congo–Italy relations are the current and historical foreign and trade relations between Democratic Republic of the Congo and Italy.

== Embassies ==
The Italian Embassy in the Democratic Republic of the Congo was established in 1960 in Kinshasa. The Embassy of the Democratic Republic of Congo is located in Rome.

== Historical background ==
The relations between Italy and the Congo Free State, a ‘personally-owned colony’ of Leopold II of Belgium, started from 1884. A largely overlooked role of Italian citizens and the government in the “Congo question” has been linked to the events that led the State of Congo and its associated private companies to involve a significant number of civilian and military officials of Italian origin. In particular, a group of officers of the Italian Army was sent to the Congo in 1903 for a three-year term, within an agreement which also foresaw the settlement of Italian colonists in the interior of the country. In the same period, Leopold II organised a propaganda campaign in Italy with the aim of obtaining a favorable outcome for the agreement. The Italian government played a relatively neutral role, as it was mainly concerned with pursuing a policy of Italian “presence” in Central Africa.

The independence of the Belgian colony seemed stable until 1955. The first reports concerning independence were sent from the Brussels embassy starting on 8 June 1960. The main concerns seemed to come from the fate of the Italian colonists. In Leopoldville, the Italian consul general, Vittorio Mascia, on 18 May 1960, noted that tension had risen in the context of the elections in Congo. The Italian settlers were restless: some women and children had fled the country. He asked the Belgians to strengthen their security apparatus and to appoint a minister to reside in Congo "until independence". By the time of the celebration of the declaration of independence of Congo, on 30 June 1960, the Italian delegation was significantly reduced. The president of the Italian republic, Giovanni Gronchi talked to the Congolese prime minister, Patrice Lumumba; the two exchanged diplomatic promises of good cooperation.

== Recent events ==
On 22 February 2021, in North Kivu, a region on the border with Rwanda, a World Food Programme (WFP) convoy was attacked and 3 people were killed. They were a WFP employee, Mustapha Milambo, the Ambassador of Italy in DRC, Luca Attanasio, and a Carabinieri officer Vittorio Iacobacci. North Kivu is an unstable region in DRC where ethnic conflicts and conflicts over control of the area's resources and illegal trafficking occur frequently. The resources are gold, gems and coltan, a component used for electronic devices. Since 2010, UN blue helmets have also intervened to restore order with the mission called MONUSCO. The conflicts are part of a broader context in which over 20 ethnic groups and their militia are supported by other international actors, such as the governments of neighbouring states and by the Islamic State of Caliph al-Baghdadi.

== Trade relations ==
The gross domestic product of the Democratic Republic of the Congo stands at $38 billion. With a population of about 92 million people, the GDP per capita is 560 dollars compared to the Italian one which is close to 35,000. However, the GDP growth rate is much higher in the DRC (5.8% per year in 2018) than in Italy (0.8%).

Trade relations between the two countries is disproportionately unbalanced in favor of the Democratic Republic of the Congo. In 2013, Italy imported over 500 million euros worth of goods from the African country, compared with exports in the opposite direction of just 67 million euros. Over the years, the deficit has undergone adjustments, but the gap is still wide: in 2019, compared with exports of 63 million euros, Italy was importing 250 million. Italian exports are varied and mainly concern ships, boats, agricultural machinery, motors, electric distributors. Imports are mainly based on the products of the Congolese mining industry.

From 2016 to 2019, Italy's net direct investment in the Democratic Republic of Congo dropped from 58 million to 17 million.

== Bilateral agreements ==
On 17 November 2016, the Italian Ministry for Environment, Land and Sea Protection and the Environment, Nature Conservation and Sustainable Development of Democratic Republic of Congo Ministry signed a Memorandum of Understanding to cooperate in the field of climate change mitigation and adaptation. On this occasion, a Joint Committee was also set up to define the Work Plans and activities undertaken in Democratic Republic of Congo. Italy is funding the project with 2 million euros.

== See also ==
- Foreign relations of the Democratic Republic of the Congo
- Foreign relations of Italy
- Luca Attanasio
