= Democratic Republic of the Congo–Germany relations =

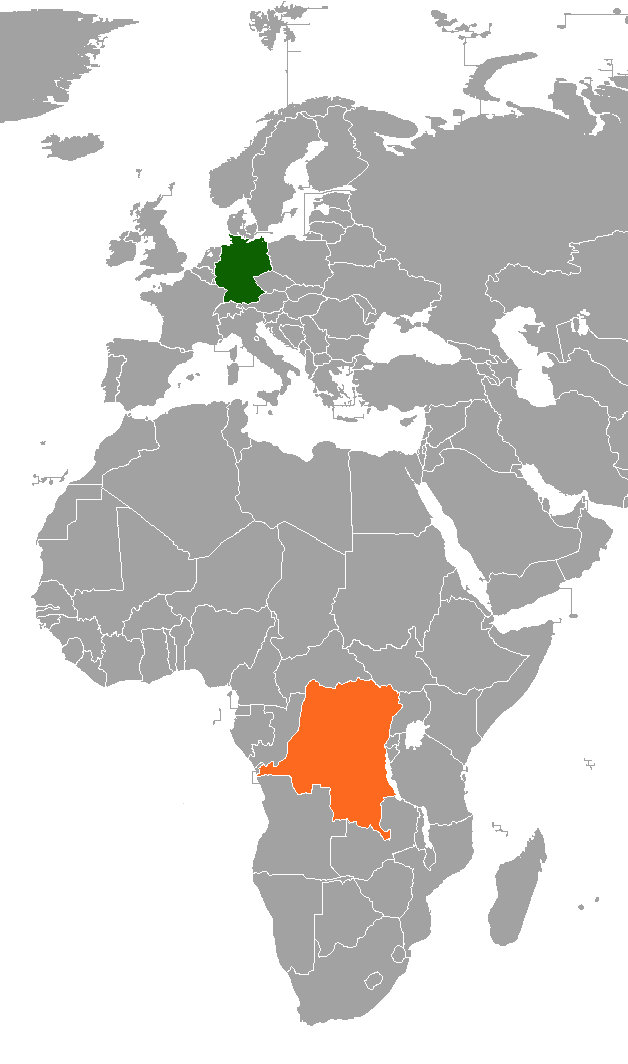

- DR Congo: Germany

Democratic Republic of the Congo–Germany relations are primarily characterized by the development aid that Germany provides in the DR Congo. Germany is one of the most important donor countries to the DR Congo.

== History ==
The German explorers Georg Schweinfurth (1863) and Hermann von Wissmann (1880) played an important role in the European exploration and discovery of the Congo. The latter acted on behalf of the Leopold II, the King of the Belgians with German ancestry. After the Congo Conference in Berlin in 1884/85, the Leopold founded the Congo Free State, which he ruled as his private property. The brutal exploitation of the Congolese population under Leopold's rule became known as Congo atrocities and claimed, according to estimates, between 5 and 15 million Congolese lives. When the cruelty of his rule became internationally known, he was forced to cede the Congo to the Belgian state in 1908.

After the country's independence, the independent Congo and the Federal Republic of Germany (FRG) established diplomatic relations in 1960, and Patrice Lumumba traveled to Wetzlar, where he met politicians and business representatives. Lumumba's assassination a year later led to numerous reactions from the German public. European mercenaries, including Gerd von Blottnitz, fought in the following Simba Rebellion in the country. In 1970, Congo also established diplomatic relations with the German Democratic Republic (GDR). In 1978, the Gesellschaft für Internationale Zusammenarbeit began its work in the country, which had been renamed to Zaire.

In 1997, Laurent-Désiré Kabila took power in the country, overthrowing longtime despot Mobutu Sese Seko. The country was then renamed from Zaire to the Democratic Republic of Congo. His son and successor Joseph Kabila visited Germany in 2002, followed by another visit from him two years later. In 2015, German Foreign Minister Frank-Walter Steinmeier visited the cities of Kinshasa and Goma, and a visit by Development Minister Gerd Müller followed a year later.

== Economic relations ==
A bilateral investment agreement between the two countries has existed since 1969, and in 2008 the German-Congolese Chamber of Commerce and Industry (Chambre de commerce et de industrie germano-congolaise, CCIGC) was founded. However, economic relations are barely developed due to the country's unstable situation and many armed conflicts. So far, hardly any German companies have become active in the DR Congo, which has large raw material deposits.

In 2021, the joint trade volume amounted to just under 223 million euros, of which 102 million were German exports to DR Congo. While Germany exports mainly chemical and industrial products to the country, it imports mainly food and raw materials in return.

== Development aid ==
Germany is the fourth-largest donor of development assistance (Official Development Assistance) to the country after the United States, France, and the European Union. Between 2015 and 2019, assistance amounted to 400 million euros. Development cooperation features three priority areas: peace and social cohesion, environment and natural resources, and growth and sustainable employment.

Successful joint projects implemented from 2008 to 2020 include the construction of drinking water points for 1.5 million people, the adoption of a national strategy against child labor, the opening of bank accounts for 1.8 million small businesses, and the construction of 800 km of roads, 120 schools, and 44 health centers. Furthermore, German aid organizations are running projects in the areas of education and schooling, student support, public health, subsistence farming, and water supply to improve health and quality of life in the villages.

== Culture ==
In 2013, the Society for German–Congolese Friendship e.V. was founded in Mühlhausen. The Goethe-Institut has maintained a liaison office in Kinshasa since 2015. Also active in the country are the Konrad Adenauer Foundation and the Hanns Seidel Foundation.

== Migration ==
In 2010, just under 10,000 migrants from the DRC were living in Germany. Well-known German Congolese are the football players Cédric Makiadi, Ridle Baku, Elias Kachunga, Reinhold Yabo, and Richard Sukuta-Pasu.

== Diplomatic missions ==
- Germany has an embassy in Kinshasa.
- DR Congo has an embassy in Berlin.

== See also ==
- Foreign relations of the Democratic Republic of the Congo
- Foreign relations of Germany
