= Democratic Republic of the Congo–Spain relations =

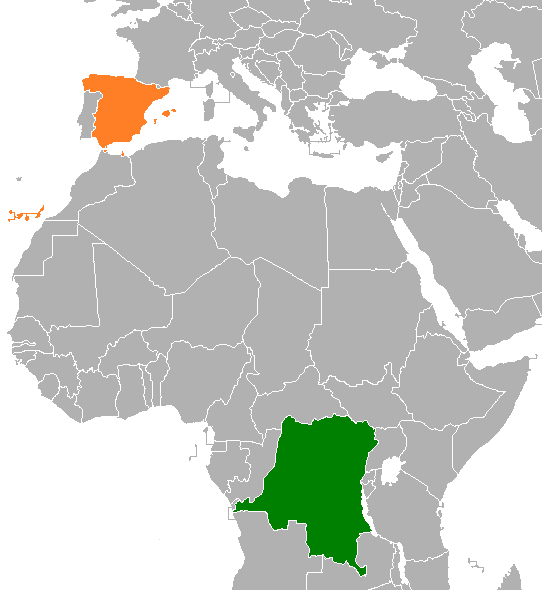
- DR Congo: Spain

Democratic Republic of the Congo–Spain relations are the bilateral relations between the Democratic Republic of the Congo (DRC) and Spain. The Democratic Republic of the Congo has an embassy in Madrid. Spain has an embassy in Kinshasa.

== Diplomatic relations ==
Relations between Spain and the Democratic Republic of the Congo have traditionally been good and in recent years, several new areas of relations have been explored, in line with the progress in the stabilization and pacification of the Democratic Republic of the Congo and the increase in the presence of Spanish companies in the African continent.

== Economic relations ==
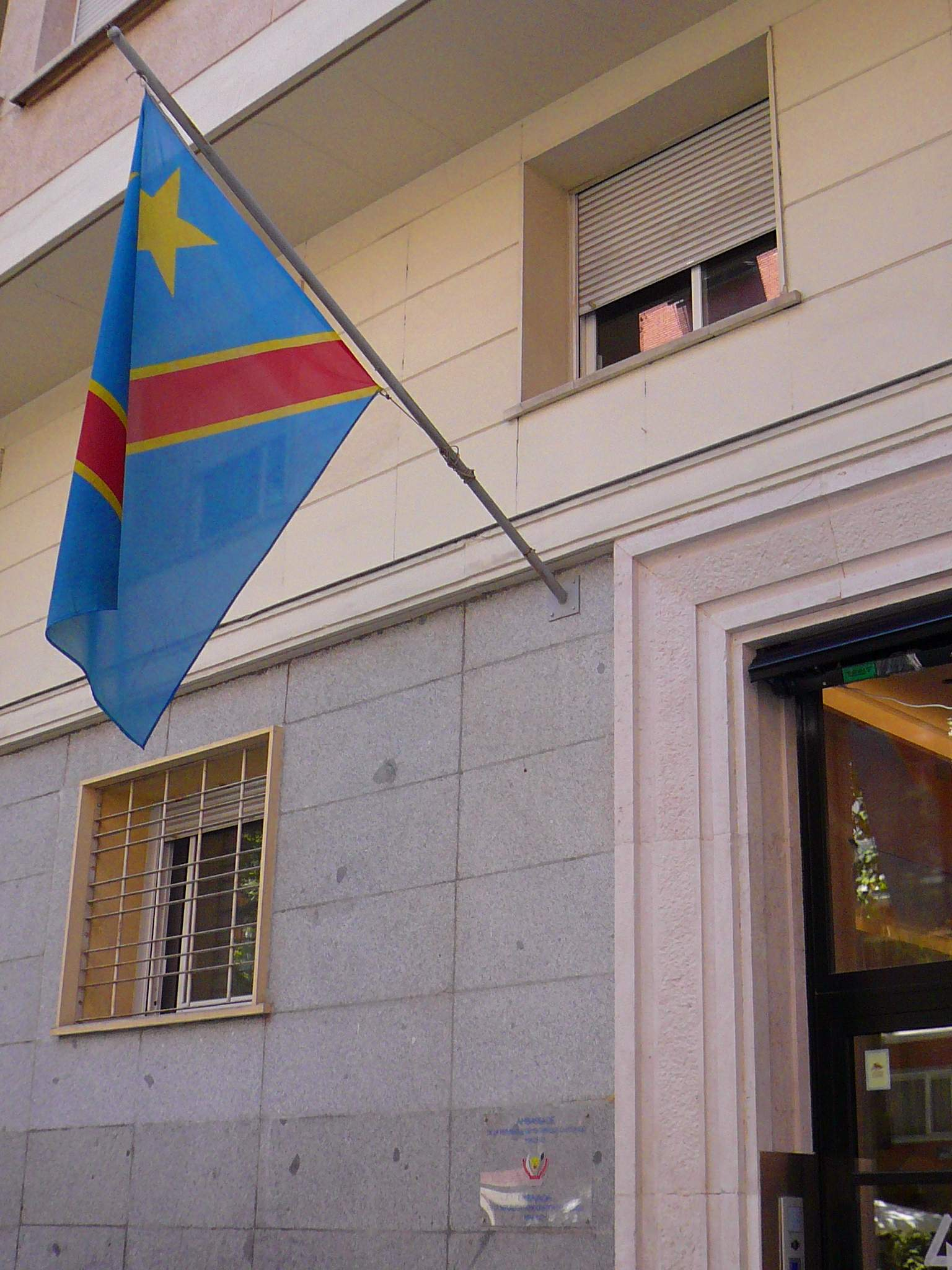
Embassy of the DR Congo in Madrid

On November 9, 2011, two bilateral renegotiation agreements (prior step for subsequent forgiveness) of debt with ICO and CESCE were signed, as a result of the agreement reached in February 2010 at the Paris Club. The refinanced debt stock amounts to $14.72 million, of which $7.57 million corresponds to FAD credits of the ICO and $7.15 to CESCE.

At the end of 2014, the procedures for the transformation of this debt into cooperation projects began. The presence of Spanish companies in the DRC has been increasing as a result of the expansion of Spanish exports and the search for new opportunities started. With the exception of Elector, the rest of Spanish companies in the DRC are still small- or standard-sized, but they participate in international competitions and in some national cases (Kisangani Airport endowment or coin-making for the National Bank of the DRC). The amount of the contracts won in competitions in the DRC was nearly 200,000 euros in 2014, highlighting the contracts obtained by ELECNOR and AEE Power, both in the sector of electrical infrastructure renovation.

With regard to imports and exports, current data indicates a clear increase in exports that have increased from 20 million in 2011, 12 to 32 in 2013, and 29 in the first three quarters of 2014, so it is expected the figure for the previous year will be exceeded.

However, the same trend does not appear with imports that are more irregular. More irregular imports depend on purchases of crude oil, while in 2013 they reached 118 million, in the first three quarters of 2014, they fell to 16 million euros. The main imported products are fuels, mineral and copper oils; the rest of the Spanish imports of DRC are kept in products such as wood, cocoa, oilseeds, etc.

Spanish exports have undergone some modification not only in quantity but in their content. Indeed, exporting fuels and lubricants we are exporting iron and steel manufactures as the first item and various food preparations second. Only thirdly, fuels are exported. Appliances and electrical equipment occupy the fourth place followed by perfumery, canned meat or fish, ceramic products, etc.

There are no figures or information of interest regarding trade in services. Tourism with other countries in the region both from the point of view of origin and destination is not significant because it is a marginal activity.

== Cooperation ==
The DRC occupies the penultimate position on the Human Development Index. The Democratic Republic of the Congo is a fragile state, with high poverty indicators that affect the whole country and a war situation in a large part of the Eastern provinces. Spanish Cooperation, present since the beginning of the 2000s and with the Technical Cooperation Office opened in 2010, commenced an exit process in 2012 due to the redefinition of the external presence of Spanish Cooperation, and was canceled in April 2013, the consequence of the new Cooperation Master Plan, in which the Democratic Republic of the Congo lost its status as a priority country.

Until 2012, the volume of ODA with the Democratic Republic of the Congo placed Spain among the top 10 donors to the DRC. However, Spain continues to maintain an important presence in the humanitarian field, a sector to which AECID allocates about five million euros (€4,940,110) through the contribution to the Common Humanitarian Fund, to humanitarian coordination actions carried out by OCHA and various projects to assist victims of armed conflicts and epidemics executed by UNICEF, Doctors Without Borders and Caritas.

Decentralized Cooperation has followed an evolution partially similar to that of AECID, reducing the volume of financial resources. The Autonomous Community of Andalusia (education) and the Basque Country and Navarra (health and education) maintain a certain presence. The same does not happen in the field of Cultural Cooperation, where throughout the year 2014 and despite having a small budget, a total of forty cultural activities have been carried out, including those dedicated to the Prince of Asturias Award for La Concordia, Caddy Adzuba, photographer Isabel Muñoz, and the Conference on Spanish Music or theatre.

== See also ==
- Foreign relations of the Democratic Republic of the Congo
- Foreign relations of Spain
