= Democratic Republic of the Congo–Greece relations =

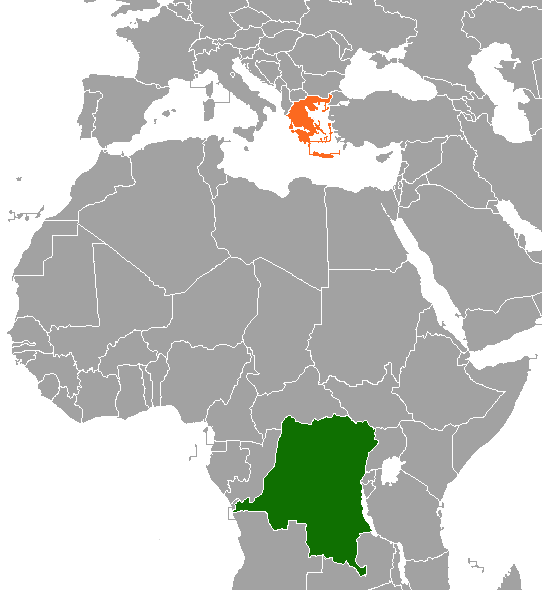
- DR Congo: Greece

Democratic Republic of the Congo–Greece relations are foreign relations between the Democratic Republic of the Congo and Greece. Greece has an embassy in Kinshasa and 2 honorary consulates in Kisangani and Lubumbashi. The Democratic Republic of the Congo has an embassy in Athens. Both countries are full members of the Organisation internationale de la Francophonie. There is a small Greek community in Congo.

== History ==
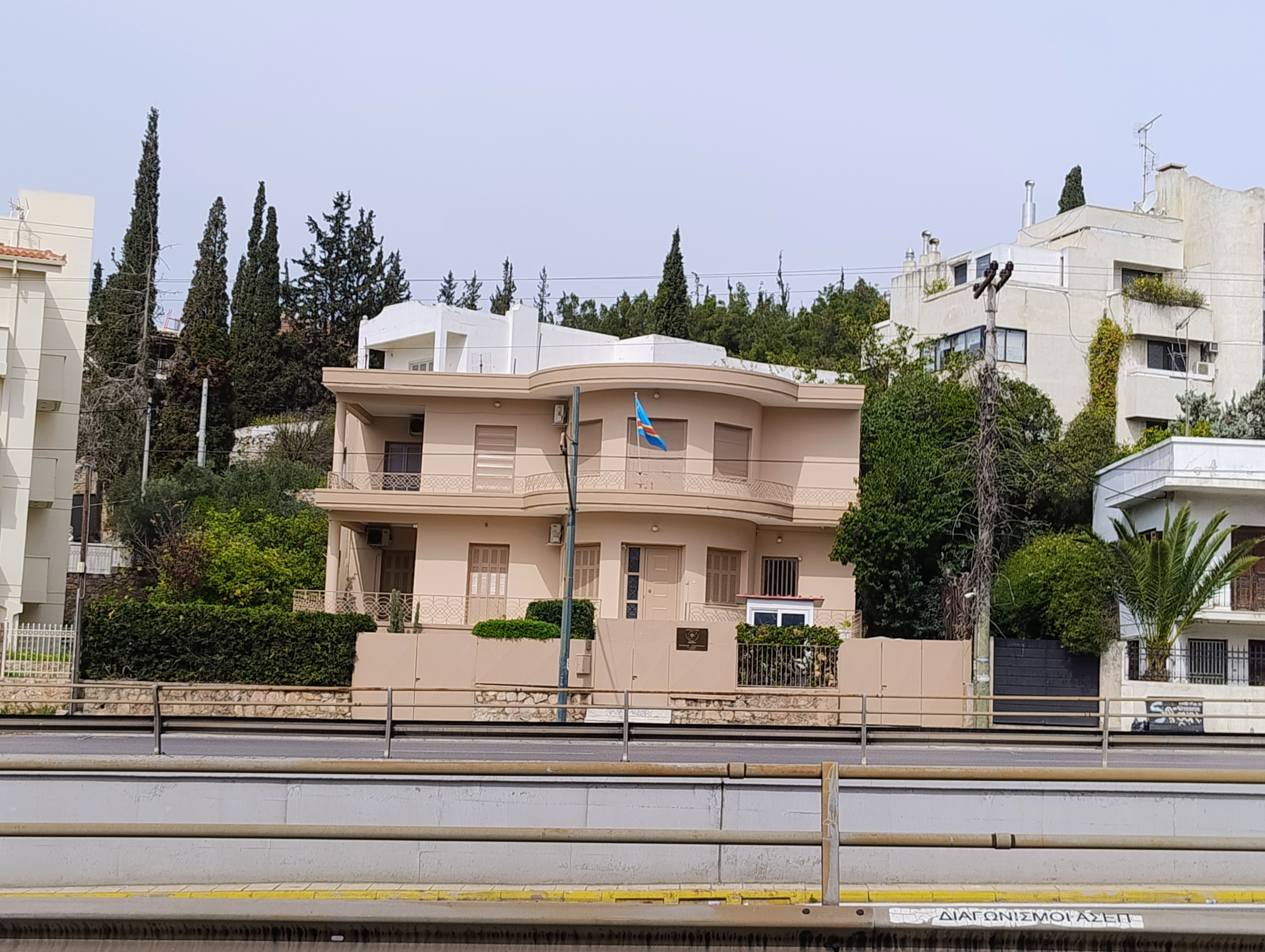
Embassy of the DR Congo in Athens

In 1960, the Hellenic Air Force, in compliance with the Greek Governmental decision, sent the 3rd Transportation Squadron to Congo, to evacuated Greeks living in the country, and transport them to secured areas.

In 1961, the Hellenic Air Force, contributing to the U.N. effort to restore order in the newly independent Republic of Congo, sent the Hellenic Air Detachment of Congo, consisting of 21 officers and NCOs. On 14 March 1961, the Hellenic Air Detachment was assigned under the command of the U.N. Air Forces and assumed responsibilities of conducting various UN missions, mainly transporting material and personnel. Later, the force have been augmented by 4 NCOs. On 9 November 1961, the Hellenic Detachment departed for Greece.

== Assistance ==
In July 2009, the Greek government pledged USD 500,000 through the UN High Commissioner for Refugees for humanitarian assistance to Congo.

== See also ==
- Foreign relations of Democratic Republic of the Congo
- Foreign relations of Greece
- Greeks in the Democratic Republic of the Congo
