= Léonard She Okitundu =

Congolese diplomat

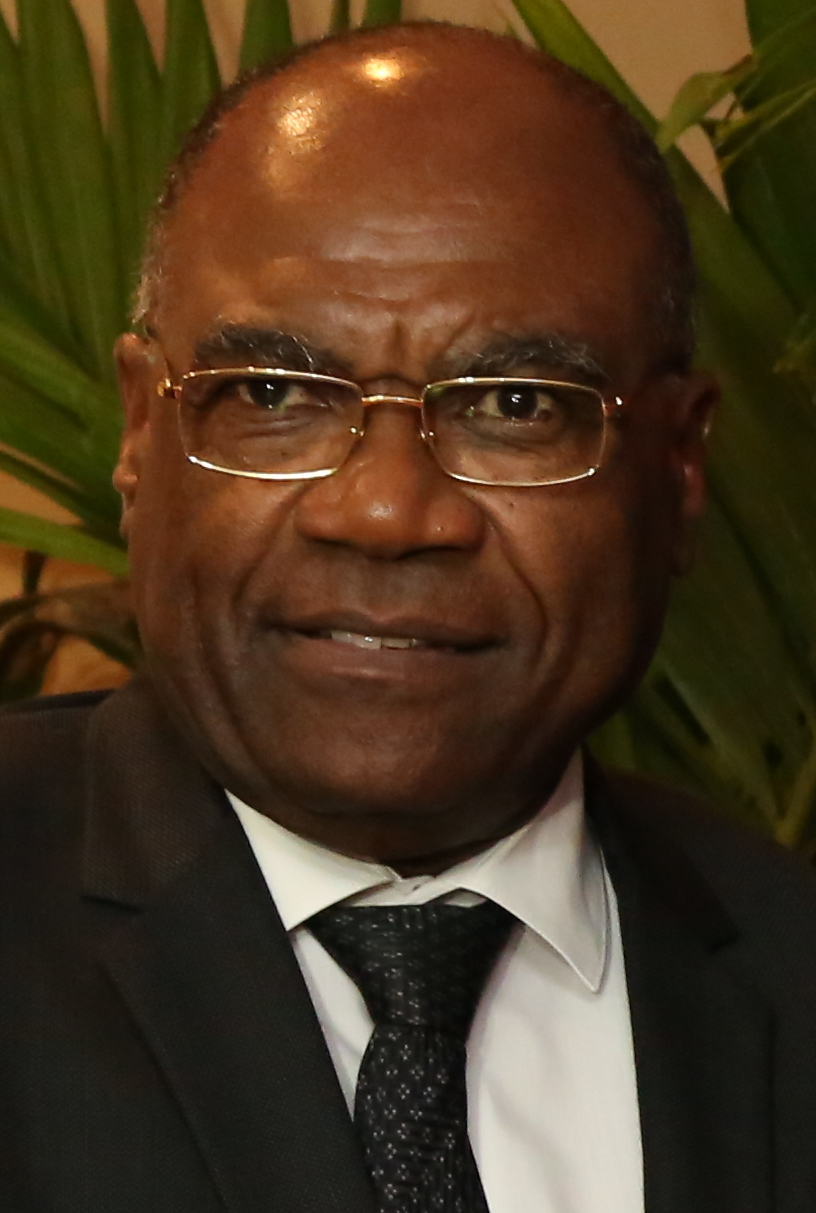

Minister of Foreign Affairs and International Cooperation
- In office December 2016 – March 2019
- President: Joseph Kabila
- Prime Minister: Bruno Tshibala
- Preceded by: Raymond Tshibanda
- Succeeded by: Alexis Thambwe Mwamba

Minister of Foreign Affairs
- In office 2000–2003
- President: Laurent-Désiré Kabila; Joseph Kabila
- Prime Minister: Vacant
- Preceded by: Abdoulaye Yerodia Ndombasi
- Succeeded by: Antoine Ghonda

Personal details
- Born: March 8, 1946 (age 80) Belgian Congo
- Occupation: Politician, diplomat

Léonard She Okitundu Lundula (born 8 March 1946) is a Congolese diplomat who has served as the Minister of Foreign Affairs and International Cooperation and one of the Vice Prime Ministers of the Democratic Republic of the Congo since December 2016 until March 2019. He has formerly held a number of other government offices in the DRC and Zaïre, being the Foreign Minister before (2000–2003), a Senator, and also chief of staff of President Joseph Kabila's administration.

== Biography ==
The son of Dovell Okitundu and Kitenge Avoki, She Okitundu was a lawyer by training and worked for Caritas Development in Switzerland for quite a long while, until 1997.

She Okitundu replaced Abdoulaye Yerodia Ndombasi in 2000 as the Minister of Foreign Affairs of the DRC, having previously been minister of human rights since March 15, 1999. In December 2001, he visited Japan for a ministerial meeting of the Tokyo International Conference on African Development. From 2003 to 2006, She Okitundu was chief of staff of President Joseph Kabila. On a visit to London during the 2006 general election in October 2006, he was attacked by men who were suspected of being opponents of Kabila outside the Foreign Office and was admitted to Central Middlesex Hospital. He is also a member of the Senate of the Democratic Republic of the Congo.

In December 2016, She Okitundu replaced Raymond Tshibanda as Minister of Foreign Affairs and International Cooperation as President Kabila reshuffled the cabinet in a deal with the Congolese opposition, postponing the general election that was supposed to occur that month. The next month, he represented the DRC at the Africa–France summit. In February She Okitundu met with Christos Stylianides, the European Commissioner for Humanitarian Aid and Civil Protection. He met with Russian Foreign Minister Sergei Lavrov in March 2017 and discussed a number of issues, including Democratic Republic of the Congo–Russia relations and regional issues. That July he met with Russian Ambassador to the DRC Igor Evdokimov and they discussed the two countries' cooperation within the framework of international organizations, as well as economic relations. In November 2017, She Okitundu traveled to several countries, meeting with Didier Reynders, his Belgian counterpart, at an African Union–European Union summit in Ivory Coast, where they discussed the opening of Belgium's new embassy in Kinshasa and increasing Belgium–Democratic Republic of the Congo relations. He also met with Sushma Swaraj, Minister of External Affairs of India, where they spoke of increasing bilateral relations between the two countries.

He stepped down as foreign minister on 7 March 2019.

== Sources ==
=== Books ===
- Europa Publications (2003). Africa South of the Sahara 2004 (Volume 1). Routledge. ISBN 978-1857431834.

Diplomatic posts
| Preceded by Abdoulaye Yerodia Ndombasi | Minister of Foreign Affairs; 2000–2003 | Succeeded by Antoine Ghonda |
| Preceded by Raymond Tshibanda | Minister of Foreign Affairs and International Cooperation; 2016–2019 | Succeeded by Alexis Thambwe Mwamba |
