= Raymond Tshibanda =

Congolese diplomat and politician

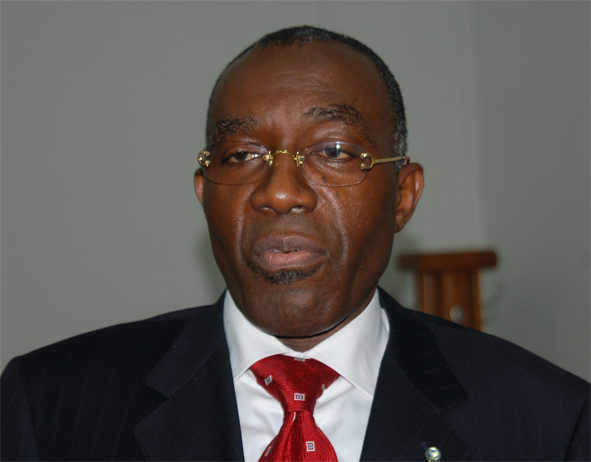

Minister of Foreign Affairs and International Cooperation
- In office 2012–2016
- President: Joseph Kabila
- Preceded by: Alexis Thambwe Mwamba
- Succeeded by: Léonard She Okitundu

President of the Liberal Christian Democrats Union
- Incumbent
- Assumed office 2007

Member of the National Assembly of Zaire
- In office 1994–1996

Personal details
- Born: 20 November 1950 (age 75) Lomela, Belgian Congo

Raymond Tshibanda N'Tungammulong (born 20 November 1950) is a Congolese diplomat and politician serving as the President of the Liberal Christian Democrats Union, a political party in the Democratic Republic of the Congo. He also served as the DRC's Minister of Foreign Affairs and International Cooperation from 2012 to 2016, and currently serves as President Joseph Kabila's special envoy to the United States.

== Career ==
Tshibanda was a member of the Ministry of Planning of what was then Zaire from 1976 to 1979, where he was in charge of External Resources Mobilization and Development. During that time, he was also a member of the faculty of the University of Kinshasa. From 1981 to 1984, he was a member of the faculty of the University of Pittsburgh. In 1985, he started working in the Office of the Prime Minister of Djibouti as Principal Economic Advisor. From there, he worked in the Office of the United Nations High Commissioner for Refugees from 1988 until 1991, at which time he began working in the Office of the Prime Minister of Zaire as Deputy Director of the Cabinet. Tshibanda was then a member of the National Assembly of Zaire from 1994 to 1996. Afterwards, he was Minister of Environment, Conservation of Nature and Tourism from 1996 to 1997. In 2003, he returned to the Minister of Planning as Vice Minister. He has served as President of the Liberal Christian Democrats Union, as well as Director of the Cabinet in the Office of the President of the Democratic Republic of the Congo, since 2007. He became Foreign Minister on April 28, 2012.
