= Elias Martins Filho =

Lieutenant General Elias Rodrigues Martins Filho (born 1960) is a Brazilian military officer who served as the Force Commander of the United Nations Organization Stabilization Mission in the Democratic Republic of the Congo (MONUSCO) from 2018 to 2019. He was commander of the Presidential guards Battalion of Brazil.

== Education ==
Born in Fortaleza, Filho graduated from the Defense War College of the Escola Superior de Guerra (ESG), Brazil and earned a post graduate degree in International Relations from the University of Brasilia (UnB). He attended command, staff, and war policy programs and was later appointed Director of the Brazilian Command, War and Staff College (Escola de Comando e Estado-Maior do Exército - ECEME) serving between 2015 and 2016.

== Career ==
Filho served at the United Nations Angola Verification Mission III in the 1990s. from 2005 to 2008, he was Planning Officer for the Department of Peace Operations and later served as Deputy Military Advisor to the Permanent Mission of Brazil in New York. He was Commanding Officer of the Presidential Guards Battalion of Brazil from 2009 to 2011. He served as Chief of Defence Intelligence at the Brazilian Ministry of Defense and as Director of the Brazilian Command, War and Staff College, from 2015 to 2016. In 2018, United Nations Secretary-General António Guterres appointed Filho (MONUSCO) leading 15,000 personnel focused on civilian protection and security. He left the command in 2019 and was succeeded by General Ricardo Augusto Ferreira Costa Neves of Brazil.
