= Mundindi Didi Kilengo =

Congolese politician and diplomat

Mundindi Didi Kilengo is the ambassador of the Democratic Republic of the Congo to Angola.

In 1997, militants of an unknown affiliation shot at the DRC's embassy in Angola. Kilengo remained unharmed.
