= Gérard Kamanda wa Kamanda =

Congolese politician

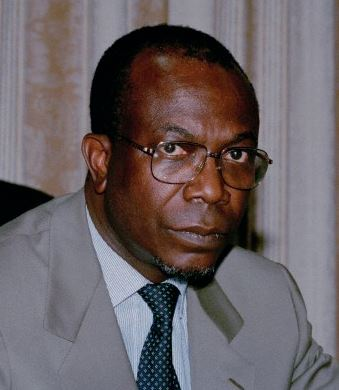
Gérard Kamanda wa Kamanda

Gerard Kamanda wa Kamanda (10 December 1940 – 21 January 2016) was a Congolese politician who stood for President in the 2006 election in the Democratic Republic of the Congo. He was born in Kikwit. He previously worked as an advisor to Mobutu Sese Seko and during the 1990s, Kamanda served in a variety of positions, including deputy prime minister, and foreign minister three times; from 1982 to 1983, from 1995 to February 1996 and from December 1996 until May 1997 when the Mobutu government collapsed. Kamanda was later the minister of scientific research in the transition government.

Kamanda represented the Nationalist Common Front party, established in 1990, which aims to modernize Congo by emphasizing science and technology. He raised concerns of electoral irregularities with the Independent Electoral Commission. According to the provisional results his presidential campaign was unsuccessful, receiving less than 3% of the vote.
