= Witjaksono Adji =

Indonesian diplomat (born 1967)

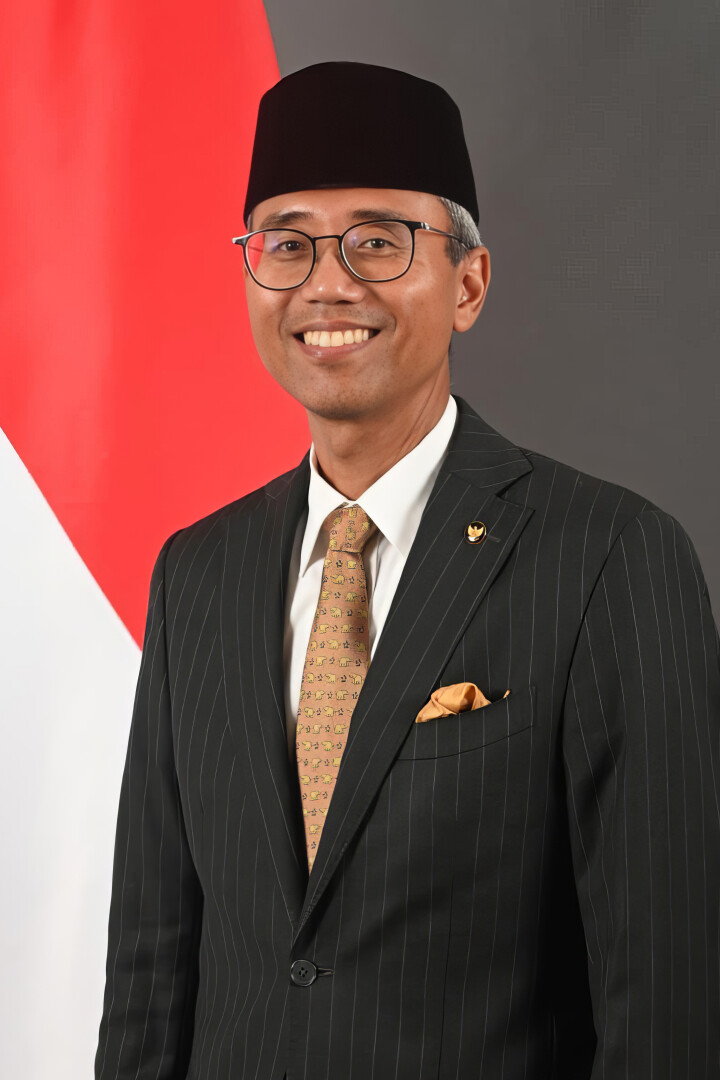

Ambassador of Indonesia to Kenya, Uganda, the Democratic Republic of the Congo, Somalia, UNEP, and UN-HABITAT
- Incumbent
- Assumed office 24 March 2025
- Preceded by: Mohamad Hery Saripudin

Personal details
- Born: 14 October 1967 (age 58)
- Spouse: Utami Astar
- Education: Gadjah Mada University; Tufts University

Tyas Baskoro Her Witjaksono Adji (born 14 October 1967) is an Indonesian diplomat who is currently serving as ambassador to Kenya, with concurrent accreditation to the Uganda, the Democratic Republic of the Congo, Somalia, UNEP, and UN-HABITAT. Prior to his appointment to the position, he served as deputy chief of mission at the embassy in Vienna and director for Asian-African intra-regional and inter-regional cooperation.

== Early life and education ==
Born in on 14 October 1967, Witjaksono began his college education at the Gadjah Mada University in 1985, majoring in international relations, and graduated in 1990. He pursued his master's studies in negotiation and conflict resolution at the Fletcher School of Law and Diplomacy from 1995 to 1997.

== Diplomatic career ==
Witjaksono joined the foreign ministry in March 1992. He was assigned to the consulate general in Osaka 1999, where he served as a junior consul until 2003. He then returned to the foreign ministry, before taking up another overseas assignment at the permanent representative to the United Nations in New York at the political section in late 2005, where he was involved in matters relating to the UN Security Council and disarmament.

Upon service at the permanent representative in New York, Witjaksono became the coordinator for political affairs at the Indonesian embassy in The Hague with the rank of minister-counsellor. During his tenure, he oversaw the launching of the INYS (Indonesia Netherlands Youth Society), a platform for youth collaboration between Indonesia and the Netherlands.

In December 2014, Witjaksono became the director for Central and Eastern Europe in the foreign ministry. Following a reorganization within the foreign ministry, on 3 January 2017 Witjaksono was appointed as the director of the 2nd European region, with responsibilities covering Central Europe and Scandinavia. He retained his post until February 2018.

Witjaksono was appointed as the deputy chief of mission at the Indonesian embassy in Vienna, where he arrived on 22 February 2018. He left his post in April 2021 and was installed as the director for Asian-African intra-regional and inter-regional cooperation on 18 August 2021. Around this period, he also briefly served as the acting director for Africa in 2022 and director for the Middle East in 2024.

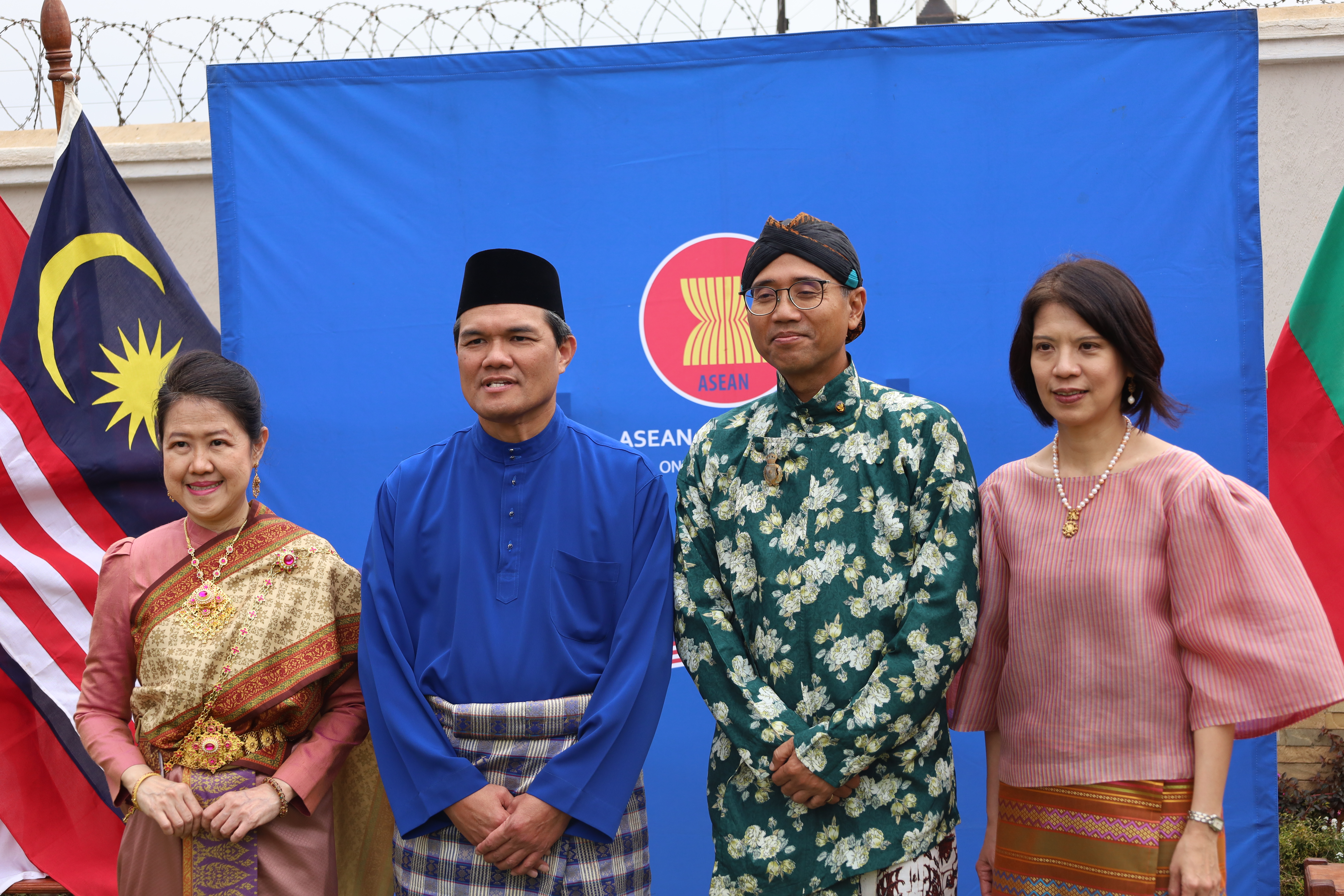
Witjaksono with other ASEAN country ambassadors at the ASEAN Day 2025 in Nairobi.

In August 2024, President Joko Widodo nominated Witjaksono as Indonesia's ambassador to Kenya, with concurrent accreditation to the Uganda, the Democratic Republic of the Congo, Somalia, the United Nations Environment Programme, and the United Nations Human Settlements Programme. He passed a fit and proper test held by the House of Representative's first commission in September that year and was installed by President Prabowo Subianto on 24 March 2025. Shortly after his installation, he and five other new ambassadors from UGM met with UGM rector Ova Emilia and Yogyakarta governor Hamengkubuwono X.

Witjaksono presented his credentials to the President of Kenya William Ruto on 3 September 2025, Director-General of the United Nations Office at Nairobi Zainab Bangura (also representing the UN Environment Programme and United Nations Human Settlements Programme) on 29 September 2025, the President of the Democratic Republic of the Congo Félix Tshisekedi on 10 November 2025, and to the President of Somalia Hassan Sheikh Mohamud on 3 December 2025.

== Personal life ==
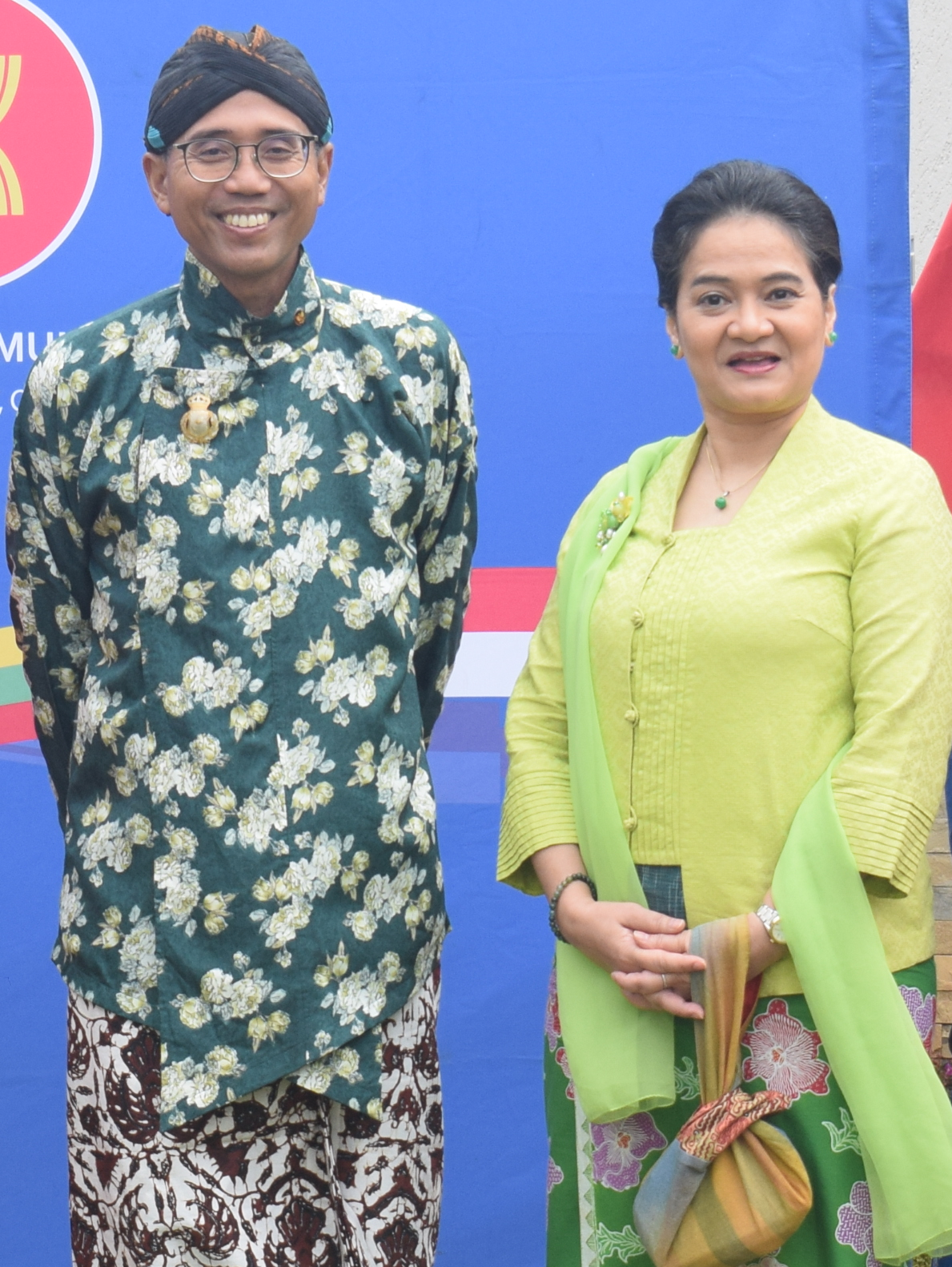
Witjaksono Adji and Utami.

Witjaksono is married to Utami P. Basuki Astar, the daughter of a diplomat. Utami, along with six other diplomat spouses, co-authored the book Di Balik Gerbang (Behind the Gates), which sheds light on the lives of Indonesian diplomats' spouses. In the book, Utami shared her experience juggling duties for VVIP guests and family responsibilities in New York.
