= Congolese Diplomatic Academy =

Diplomatic training institute in the Democratic Republic of the Congo

The Congolese Diplomatic Academy (French: Académie diplomatique congolaise) is an institute for training diplomats of the Ministry of Foreign Affairs and International Cooperation of the Democratic Republic of the Congo in Kinshasa. It was established in 2006 (20 years ago) to improve the quality of the DRC's diplomatic corps, graduating 200 civil servants by 2009. The school cooperates with other institutions from abroad, including ones from France, South Africa, Russia, and the Netherlands.

The director of the academy, as of 2010, was Bonaventure Mpasi Makenga. In 2019 the director was Pierre André Ngekene Bus-Mbul, and as of 2022 the director was Djuma Kauzeni Rashidi.

== See also ==
- Education in the Democratic Republic of the Congo
