= Antoine Ghonda =

Democratic Republic of the Congo politician (born 1965)

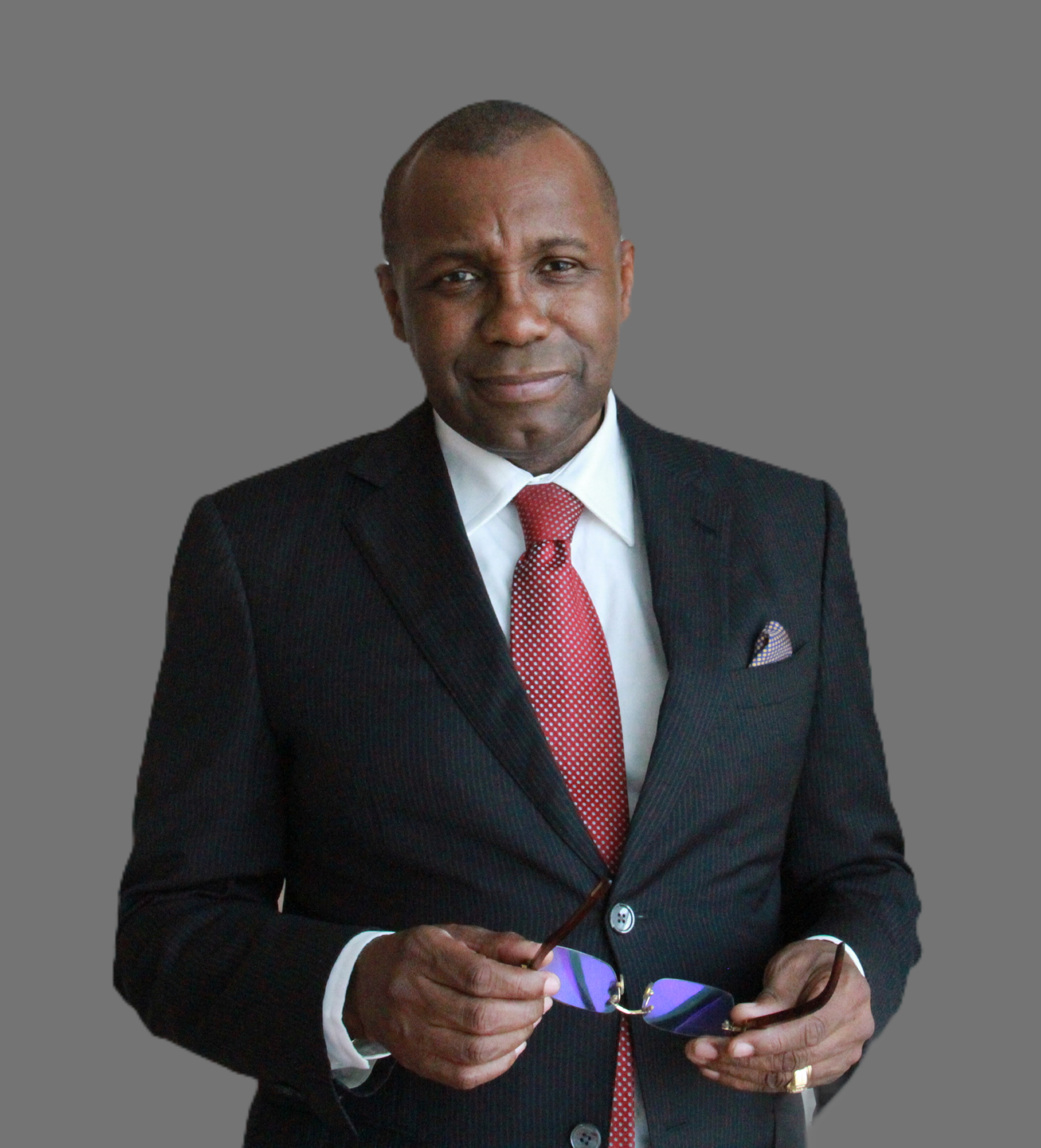
- Antoine Ghonda in 2023

Minister of Foreign Affairs of the Democratic Republic of the Congo
- In office 30 June 2003 – 22 July 2004
- President: Joseph Kabila

Itinerant Ambassador of the Democratic Republic of the Congo
- Incumbent
- Assumed office 8 March 2025

Personal details
- Born: Antoine Ghonda Mangalibi; February 19, 1965 (age 61) Louvain, Belgium
- Party: À nous de bâtir le Congo (ANB)
- Education: Florida International University
- Occupation: Politician, diplomat

Antoine Ghonda Mangalibi (born February 19, 1965) was the foreign minister of the Democratic Republic of the Congo from June 30, 2003, until July 23, 2004. He is currently an itinerant ambassador for President Félix Tshisekedi since March 8, 2025.

Ghonda was born in Leuven, Belgium, and grew up in the Bas Congo province of the Democratic Republic of the Congo, which was then known as Zaire. He did university studies in the United States, and earned a B.A. degree in International Relations from Florida International University in 1992. From 1992 to 2000, he worked in his family's businesses, and developed a lucrative career in international trade. He took a keen interest in politics during these years, but did not align himself politically during the late years of the Mobutu Sese Seko presidency, nor during the early part of the presidency of Laurent-Désiré Kabila.

In 2003, the Congolese Liberation Movement made peace with the national government led by Joseph Kabila and joined a transitional government in which there were four vice-presidents, including two heading major rebel groups. Bemba became one of the vice-presidents and was given the power to appoint the foreign minister. Ghonda was given the post.

In the 2006 legislative elections, Ghonda was elected to a seat in National Assembly, representing a district in Bas-Congo province whose main town is Kisantu. The Foundation Antoine Ghonda in this town is a leading source of socio-economic development in the area.

Ghonda survived the crash of a private jet near Bukavu on 12 February 2012.

== See also ==
- Thérèse Kayikwamba Wagner
- Faida Mitifu
