= 2000s in history of the Democratic Republic of the Congo =

Congolese history in the 2000s has primarily revolved around the Second Congo War (1998–2003) and the empowerment of a transitional government.

== 2000 to 2003 ==
Joseph Kabila became the head of state in 2001 when his father, President Laurent Kabila, was assassinated. In October 2002 Kabila negotiated the withdrawal of Rwandan forces occupying eastern Congo. Two months later, the Pretoria Accord was signed by all remaining warring parties to end the fighting and establish a government of national unity. The transitional period came to end with the completion of the 2006 general election and the swearing in of Kabila as President on December 6, 2006.

On December 17, 2002 the Congolese parties of the Inter Congolese Dialogue, namely: the national government, the MLC, the RCD, the RCD-ML, the RCD-N, the domestic political opposition, representatives of civil society and the Mai Mai, signed the Global and All-Inclusive Agreement. The Agreement obliges the parties to a plan to reunify the country, disarm and integrate the warring parties and hold elections. There have been numerous problems, resulting in continued instability in much of the country and a delay in the scheduled national elections from June 2005 to March 2006, later pushed back again to 30 July 2006.

This agreement marked the formal end of the Second Congo War. Three rebel groups supported by Uganda, the MLC, RCD-N and RCD-ML, signed a ceasefire, the Gbadolite Agreement, on December 31, 2002. This obliged them to immediately stop all fighting in the Isiro-Bafwasende-Beni-Watsa quadrangle and to accept United Nations military observers in the area. It also contained guarantees of the freedom of movement of the civilian population and humanitarian organizations from one area to another. This treaty was violated numerous times.

== 2003 ==
A transitional government was set up in July 2003; Joseph Kabila remains as president and now has four vice presidents representing the former government, former rebel groups, and the political opposition.

Despite the formal end of hostilities the conflict continued. During January and February 2003, MONUC observed numerous hostile troop movements, mainly between Uganda, Rwanda and their respective proxies. On May 1, 2003 Uganda withdrew its regular forces from Bunia and Ituri in-line with the Luanda Agreement. Fighting erupted between the Hema and Lendu ethnic groups between 7 May and 16 May in Bunia.

On 30 June a transitional government composed of the various groups of the Inter Congolese Dialogue was formed. Over the course of September, a reinforced MONUC presence carried out the "Bunia, weapon-free zone" operation to demilitarize the province. They were partially successful, though a low-grade conflict continues to permeate the region.

In September 2004 between 20,000 and 150,000 people fled unrest in the eastern Kivu province caused by an advance of government troops against breakaway national army soldiers. On October 1, 2004, the UN Security Council decided to deploy 5,900 more soldiers to the MONUC mission in Congo, although UN Secretary-General Kofi Annan had asked for some 12,000.

In this period the International Rescue Committee reported that the conflict was killing 1,000 people a day, and called the international response "abysmal". Comparing the war with Iraq, it said that during 2004 Iraq received aid worth the equivalent of $138 per person, whilst the Congo received $3 per person.

== 2004 ==
In late November 2004 Rwandan president Paul Kagame declared that Rwanda retained the option of sending troops into Congo to fight Hutu militants, in particular the Democratic Forces for the Liberation of Rwanda (FDLR) that has not yet been disarmed as promised in the 2002 Pretoria Agreement. As of mid-December 2004 there were many reports that Rwandan forces had crossed the border. MONUC chief M'Hand Djalouzi, commenting on the reports, said on December 1, "Infiltration is nothing new but this is something else, it has the appearance of an invasion." It remains unclear whether the Rwandan military is holding territory or carrying out temporary operations. The UN has promised to investigate.

On December 16, the BBC reported that 20,000 civilians had fled fighting in the North Kivu town of Kanyaboyonga, 100 miles north of Goma. Antigovernment forces led by a Captain Kabakuli Kennedy, who has stated that he is fighting to defend the Banyamulenge, has routed loyalist government forces and holds the town and the surrounding mountains. The government sent a mediation team to investigate and accused Rwanda of supporting another insurgency. Rwanda has denied any involvement in the fighting.

The International Crisis Group released a report on 17 December warning that the Rwandan intervention threatened to roll back the progress made in years of peace talks. They further noted that the two recent wars both began in similar circumstances to that existing presently in the Kivus and that another regional war was entirely possible if diplomatic efforts were not made.

Later in 2004, Nkunda's forces began clashing with the DRC army in Sud-Kivu and by May 2004, occupied Bukavu where he was accused of committing war crimes. Nkunda claimed he was attempting to prevent genocide against Tutsis in the region, a claim rejected by MONUC, and denied the claim that he was following orders from Rwanda. Following UN negotiations which secured the withdrawal of Nkunda's troops from Bukuvu back to the Masisi forests, part of his army split, and led by Colonel Jules Mutebutsi left for Rwanda. About 150,000 Kinyarwanda-speaking people (Nkunda's own language) were reported to have fled from Sud-Kivu to Nord-Kivu in fear of reprisal attacks by DRC army.

== 2005 ==
On January 25, 2005 the UN reported that Uganda and Rwanda were continuing to arm insurgent groups in eastern Congo, in violation of a United Nations arms embargo in the region. Both nations denied any wrongdoing, and the UPDF spokesman suggested that MONUC was useless and should be disbanded. Meanwhile, a meeting of African leaders in Abuja agreed to send more peacekeepers to the Congo and tasked with disarming the mainly Hutu rebel forces in an attempt to stem the escalating tensions. In response, a spokesman of the Democratic Forces for the Liberation of Rwanda stated on 2 February that the FDLR would resist with force any attempt to disarm it. The same day US Secretary of State Condoleezza Rice welcomed senior officials from the DRC, Uganda and Rwanda to Washington, DC for talks aimed at easing tensions in the region.

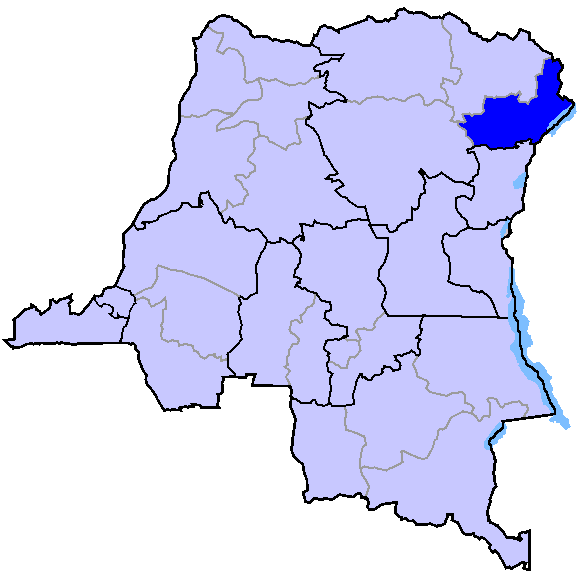
Ituri (highlighted) is just north of Nord-Kivu

On February 25, the resilience of the Ituri conflict was demonstrated when nine Bangladeshi MONUC peacekeepers were ambushed and killed by unidentified gunmen while patrolling an internally displaced persons camp in Kafe in Ituri Province. This was the largest single loss of peacekeeper life since the 1994 Rwandan genocide. Floribert Ndjabu, the leader of the Nationalist and Integrationist Front (FNI) militia operating in northeastern Ituri was arrested, while three other militia leaders were questioned. MONUC forces assaulted an FNI stronghold and killed fifty militia members, in what the Secretary-General referred to as "self-defense."

On March 31 the Democratic Forces for the Liberation of Rwanda (FDLR) stated that it was giving up the armed struggle and returning to Rwanda to form a political party. This announcement followed talks mediated by Sant'Egidio in Rome with Congolese government representatives. If carried out by the various FDLR commanders, a return would remove one of the major sources of tensions in the region. The Rwandan government stated that any returnee who participated in the Rwandan genocide would face justice.

In December 2005 UN and Congolese troops launched an operation in the Ituri district in order to restore peace and drive out the Ugandan-backed rebels.

== 2006 ==
The constitution of the DRC was formally adopted on 19 February 2006 after it was approved in a popular referendum in December. A new national flag was adopted.

With UN assistance, on July 30, 2006 free first multi-party elections were held since independence in 1960. After this Joseph Kabila took 45% of the votes and his opponent Jean-Pierre Bemba took 20%. That was the origin of a fight between the two parts from August 20–22, 2006 in the streets of the capital, Kinshasa. Sixteen people died before policemen and UN mission MONUC took control of the city. A run-off election was held on 29 October 2006. On November 11, with 65% of the votes counted and Kabila holding the lead with 61% to Bemba's 39%, and with some of Bemba's supporters claiming election fraud, fighting again broke out in the streets of Kinshasa between soldiers supporting each candidate, killing two civilians.

== 2007 ==
Tutsi-majority army brigades fought with the Hutu Democratic Forces for the Liberation of Rwanda (FDLR) throughout 2007. More than 165,000 people fled the fighting. The United Nations Mission in the Democratic Republic of Congo and human rights activists accused the army of targeting civilian centers sympathetic to the FDLR. The Bravo Brigade allegedly murdered 15 civilians in Buramba village in March. General Gabriel Amisi temporarily halted operations against the FDLR in August, saying operations would resume when ethnically mixed brigades would replace the current Tutsi-majority forces.

== See also ==
- Transitional Government of the Democratic Republic of the Congo
- Transitional National Assembly of the Democratic Republic of the Congo
