= Democratic Republic of the Congo–Rwanda peace agreement =

Democratic Republic of the Congo–Rwanda peace agreement may refer to:

- Lusaka Ceasefire Agreement in 1999
- Pretoria Accord in 2002
- 2025 Democratic Republic of the Congo–Rwanda peace agreement, also called the Washington Accord
