= Operation North Night Final =

Operation North Night Final was a joint DR Congo-UN peacekeeper operation in December 2005 to restore peace in the troubled Ituri district of the Democratic Republic of the Congo. The operation was mainly aimed at fighting the Ugandan rebels stationed there (Allied Democratic Forces/National Army for the Liberation of Uganda) and involved ca. 3,500 Congolese troops, supported by 600 UN peacekeepers using helicopter gunships. The attacks happened at the time of a referendum on a new constitution. The operation began when the Allied Democratic Forces launched a counter-attack against the Congolese and UN soldiers in North Kivu province. An Indian peacekeeper and three Congolese soldiers were killed in this attack.

== Background ==
Since the end of the Second Congo War many rebel groups and the government forces were active in the area of Ituri and North Kivu, with continuous and serious human rights violations against the civilian population, according to several reports received by human rights groups. An example of this was six fishermen who had been extra-judicially executed by soldiers at Koga on 18 November 2005, inhabitants of the area were ordered to bury the bodies in a mass grave. A seventh victim is alleged to have been killed at the same location two days later. Three further bodies (a man, woman and five year old child) had been found two km away from the site of the killings. The local population believes these victims were killed as they attempted to flee.

== See also ==
- Second Congo War
- Ituri conflict
