= Gbadolite Agreement =

Unsuccessful attempt to end the Second Congo War

The Gbadolite Agreement, signed on December 31, 2002, in Gbadolite, Democratic Republic of the Congo, attempted unsuccessfully to end the Second Congo War. The signatories, all of which were supported by the Ugandan government, are the Movement for the Liberation of Congo (MLC), the Rally for Congolese Democracy-National (RCD-N) and the Rally for Congolese Democracy-Liberation Movement (RCD-ML).

The parties agreed to a ceasefire in the Isiro-Bafwasende-Beni-Watsa quadrangle and to immediately accept United Nations military observers in the area. It also contained guarantees of the freedom of movement of the civilian population and humanitarian organizations from one area to another.

As with previous treaties the Gbadolite Agreement failed to end the war.
