= Ernest Wamba dia Wamba =

African political philosopher (1942–2020)

Personal details
- Born: 1942 Bas-Congo, Belgian Congo (Now Congo-Kinshasa)
- Died: 15 July 2020 (aged 77–78) Mbanza-Ngungu, Democratic Republic of the Congo
- Spouse: Elaine Wamba
- Education: Western Michigan University (BA); Claremont Colleges (MBA)

Ernest Wamba dia Wamba (French pronunciation: [ɛʁnɛst wɑ̃ba dja wɑ̃ba]; 1942 – July 15, 2020) was a prominent Congolese academic and political theorist who became a commander of the Kisangani faction of the rebel Rally for Congolese Democracy during the Second Congo War.

== Early life ==
Wamba dia Wamba was born in Sundi-Lutete, Bas-Congo Province. He was raised in Swedish mission schools and grew into adulthood in the period when the prophetism of Simon Kimbangu and the political agitation for independence by the Association des Bakongo (ABAKO) was reaching its peak. When ABAKO split, he favoured the faction of Daniel Kanza.

Upon graduation from secondary school, he was one of three students awarded scholarships by the African-American Institute to study in the United States. He went to Western Michigan University in Kalamazoo, where Wamba wrote his honors dissertation on the philosophers Maurice Merleau-Ponty and Jean-Paul Sartre. He later went on to graduate studies at Claremont before teaching at Brandeis University, where he was associated with Peter F. Drucker. He went on to teach at Harvard University.

During his period in the U.S., Wamba dia Wamba married an African-American woman and was involved in the Civil Rights Movement through the Student Nonviolent Coordinating Committee . Once the period of decolonization began in Africa, he joined the supporting committees of various US-based pan-Africanist movements.

In 1980, he accepted a position as Professor of History at the University of Dar es Salaam in Tanzania. In 1981, while visiting his parents' village in Zaire, he was arrested by the government of Mobutu Sese-Seko for possessing a paper he had authored that was deemed 'subversive', and was detained for one year. He continued his role as a prominent figure in both academia and political circles in Africa. He is the former president of the Council for the Development of Social Science Research in Africa (CODESRIA) as well as the founder and president of the philosophy club at the University of Dar es Salaam. He was an expert in the Palaver (politics) and other indigenous forms of African democracy. He participated in the Sovereign National Conference, held from 1990 through 1992 in Zaire. In 1997 he co-authored with Jacques Depelchin, the African Declaration Against Genocide.

In December 1997, Wamba was named a recipient of the Dutch Prince Claus Award for Culture and Development. The announcement of the award cited his "scholarly contribution to the development of African philosophy and for sparking off the philosophical debate on social and political themes in Africa." At this time he also worked closely with Tanzanian President Julius Nyerere to end the Burundi Civil War.

== The Second Congo War ==
At the beginning of the Second Congo War against the government of Laurent-Désiré Kabila, Wamba was unanimously elected head of the rebel Rally for Congolese Democracy (RCD), which was backed by Uganda and Rwanda and based in the town of Goma. However, the RCD gradually split from November 1998 until 16 May 1999, as it became clear that Rwanda and its supporters' goals were limited to replacement of Kabila. Several attempts were made on Wamba's life during this period, coinciding with attempts to destroy his political power in the RCD.

On 16 May 1999, Émile Ilunga was named the new head of the RCD after manoeuvring by Rwanda, and Wamba fled to the Ugandan-controlled town of Kisangani. The faction of the RCD he maintained control of was variously known as the Movement for Liberation (RCD-ML), RCD-Kisangani, or RCD-Wamba. The main faction is sometimes referred to as RCD-Goma. The two factions shortly engaged in fierce battles in Kisangani, following which Wamba retreated to Bunia in the Ituri region of the northeastern DRC.

Wamba was faced with an internal revolt by Mbusa Nyamwisi, leading to another split in his party's faction. His organization remained known as the RCD-Kisangani (RCD-K), while the Nyamwisi-led group was known as the RCD-ML. In 2001, Wamba denounced a Ugandan proposal to unite the RCD-K, RCD-ML and Movement for the Liberation of Congo (MLC) as an unwelcome foreign imposition. The further disintegration of the RCD-K to the point it was without any significant military force may have been the result of Ugandan withdrawal of its support. This action, which took place as the Ituri conflict continued escalating, was seen by some members of the Lendu ethnic group as a support against what they saw as the pro-Hema bias of Uganda.

== The Post-War Period ==
Following the Inter-Congolese Dialogue that ended the war, Wamba became a prominent member of the new government. He spoke extensively on what was needed for the DRC to make a successful transition to a functioning democracy.

He continued to be politically involved and to write, and was a noted political theorist widely respected for, in particular, his innovative use of the work of the African-born Parisian philosopher Alain Badiou, whom he introduced to contemporary African political thought. Scholars of Africana like Jacques Depelchin, Michael Neocosmos and Raj Patel have taken up Wamba's use of Badiou's work.

A May 2008 article authored by Jacques Depelchin warned that there were new threats to assassinate Wamba.

In the last years of his life, Wamba remained politically active, running reading groups with young activists in Kinshasa and engaging popular organisations across the continent, including Abahlali baseMjondolo in South Africa.

== Political Thought ==
Wamba’s politics centred on the idea that emancipatory change had to be driven by organised popular movements rather than imposed through the state. He argued that postcolonial African states largely reproduced colonial structures and remained subordinated to neocolonial interests, and criticised what he saw as African intellectuals’ excessive focus on state power. He emphasised participatory democracy, independent popular organisation, pan-Africanism and the need to build a shared conception of the common good. Although he participated in armed struggle he maintained that military power should remain subordinate to popular democratic power.

== Death ==
Wamba dia Wamba died on July 15, 2020, in a hospital in Kinshasa where he had been hospitalized for multiple days. The cause of death has been reported as an asthma attack.

== Books ==
- Wamba Dia Wamba, Ernest (2005), "DRC: Globalisation, War and the Struggle for Freedom" in Manji, F., and Burnett, P (eds), African Voices on Development and Social Justice Editorials from Pambazuka News, Oxford: Pambazuka News Fahamu Books
- Wamba Dia Wamba, E., and M. Mamdani, eds (1995), African Studies in Social Movements and Democracy, CODESRIA, ISBN 2-86978-052-4.
- Wamba Dia Wamba, Ernest (1994), "In Search of a New Mode of Politics in Africa" in Development in an African Perspective, London: James Currey.

== Articles ==
- "Balkanisation and crisis in eastern Congo Ernest Wamba dia Wamba speaks to Pambazuka News" (2008). Published in Pambazuka News Balkanisation and crisis in eastern Congo | Pambazuka News
- "Congo" (2004). Published in Zmag zcommunications.org - zcommunications Resources and Information.
- "Democracy Today: The case of the Democratic Republic of Congo" (2007). Published in Pambazuka News Democracy Today: The case of the Democratic Republic of Congo | Pambazuka News
- "Zaire: From the National Conference to the Federal Republic of the Congo?" (2004). Published in Development Dialogue No.2

== Interviews ==
- Interview with Ernest Wamba dia Wamba (2009). Published in Ota Benga Alliance Interview with Ernest Wamba dia Wamba | Ota Benga Alliance
- The Thought and Practice of an Emancipatory Politics for Africa (2022), An interview with Michael Neocosmos The Thought and Practice of an Emancipatory Politics for Africa
