= Emile Ilunga =

Congolese politician

Émile Ilunga Kalambo is a politician and former leader of the Rally for Congolese Democracy–Goma (RDC-Goma) rebel movement.

The RCD, operating in the east of the DRC, was a major factor in launching the Second Congo War (1998-2003), a rebellion against the government of Laurent-Désiré Kabila. At first the RCD was led by Professor Ernest Wamba dia Wamba. A split developed in the RCD between November 1998 and May 1999. Several attempts were made on Wamba dia Wamba's life, and in May 1999 he was ousted from the leadership. Dr. Emile Ilunga was named leader of the mainstream Rwanda-backed faction known as the RCD-Goma from its base in the town of Goma. Ilunga is a medical doctor from Katanga. His faction of the RCD was dominated by Rwanda, which wanted to eliminate hostile Interahamwe militia forces that it believed Laurent Kabila was supporting.
