= Michael Neocosmos =

South African academic

Michael Neocosmos is a South African Marxist political theorist. He is an emeritus professor in humanities at Rhodes University, Distinguished Visiting Scholar at the University of Connecticut Humanities Institute and a fellow at the Centre for Humanities Research at the University of the Western Cape.

== Work ==
Neocosmos holds a B.Sc. (1972, Loughborough University, UK), a MA (1973, Wye College, University of London, UK), and a Ph.D. (1982, Bradford University, UK).

He has taught at various universities in the United Kingdom and in Africa, most especially at the University of Dar es Salaam, Tanzania, at the University of Swaziland, at the National University of Lesotho where he headed the Department of Development Studies, at the University of Botswana where he was associate professor of sociology, the University of Pretoria where he held the position of Professor of Sociology, at Monash University where he was Director of Global Movements Research and at Rhodes University in Grahamstown, South Africa where he was the Director of the Unit for the Humanities at Rhodes University (UHURU).

== Awards ==
In 2017, Neocosmos's book Thinking Freedom in Africa, was awarded The Frantz Fanon Award for Outstanding Book in Caribbean Thought by the Caribbean Philosophical Association.

== Works ==
=== Books ===
- Neocosmos, Michael, ed. (1987). Social Relations in Rural Swaziland. Kwaluseni: University of Swaziland.
- Neocosmos, Michael (1993). The Agrarian Question in Southern Africa and "Accumulation from Below": Economics and Politics in the Struggle for Democracy. Uppsala: Nordic Africa Institute. ISBN 9789171063427.
- Neocosmos, Michael (2006). From Foreign Natives to Native Foreigners: Explaining Xenophobia in South Africa (PDF). Dakar: Council for the Development of Social Science Research in Africa. ISBN 9782869782006. Archived from the original (PDF) on 16 December 2008 – via Internet Archive.
- Neocosmos, Michael (2016). Thinking Freedom in Africa: Towards a Theory of Emancipatory Politics. Johannesburg: Wits University Press. ISBN 978-1-86814-869-1.
- Neocosmos, Michael (2021). Politics and Culture in African Emancipatory Thought. Daraja Press. ISBN 9781990263330.
- Neocosmos, Michael (2023). Domains of politics and modes of rule: Political structures of the neocolonial state in Africa. Daraja Press. ISBN 9781990263774.
- Neocosmos, Michael (2026). Beyond the Neocolonial: Africa and the Dialectics of Human Emancipation. Daraja Press. ISBN 978-1-990263-88-0.

=== Articles ===
- From people's politics to state politics: aspects of national liberation in South Africa 1984--1994, 1994
- Thinking the Impossible? Elements of a Critique of Political Liberalism in South Africa, 2004
- The State of the Post-apartheid State: the poverty of critique on the South African left, 2004
- Citizenship, Rights and Development: Revisiting the social in Africa today, 2005
- Civil society, citizenship and the politics of the (im)possible: rethinking militancy in Africa today, 2007
- The Pogroms in South Africa: The Politics of Fear and the Fear of Politics, 2008
- Africa and Migration in a Globalised World, 2008
- The Political Meaning of the Attacks on Abahlali baseMjondolo, 2009
- The Political Conditions of Social Thought and the Politics of Emancipation: An Introduction to the work of Sylvain Lazarus, 2009
- Mass mobilisation, ‘democratic transition’ and ‘transitional violence’ in Africa, 2011
- Transition, human rights and violence: rethinking a liberal political relationship in the African neo-colony, Interface, 2011
- Are Those-Who-Do-Not-Count Capable of Reason? Thinking Political Subjectivity in the (Neo-)Colonial World and the Limits of History, 2012
- Thinking freedom: achieving the impossible collectively - Interview with Michael Neocosmos, 2018
- The Thought and Practice of an Emancipatory Politics for Africa, Interview with Ernest Wamba-dia-Wamba, 2022
