= Floribert Ndjabu =

Floribert Ndjabu is leader of the Nationalist Integrationist Front (Le Front des nationalistes et intégrationnistes – FNI) in Ituri, Democratic Republic of the Congo. He draws most of his support from the Lendu ethnic group.

In March 2005, the Security Council condemned the FNI's attack on a patrol of the United Nations Mission in the Democratic Republic of the Congo (MONUC) which occurred on 25 February 2005 near the town of Kafé, resulting in the murder of nine Bangladeshi peacekeepers. Shortly after this attack Ndjabu was arrested in Kinshasa and placed under house arrest.

== See also ==
- Politics of the Democratic Republic of the Congo
- Military of the Democratic Republic of the Congo
- Foreign relations of the Democratic Republic of the Congo
