= Luanda Agreement =

2002 ceasefire between Uganda and DR Congo

Agreement Between the Governments of the Democratic Republic of the Congo and the Republic of Uganda on Withdrawal of Ugandan Troops from the Democratic Republic of the Congo, Cooperation and Normalisation of Relations Between Two Countries
- Type: Peace treaty
- Context: Second Congo War
- Signed: 6 September 2002
- Location: Pretoria, South Africa
- Mediators: José Eduardo dos Santos; João Bernardo de Miranda
- Negotiators: Joseph Kabila; Yoweri Museveni; José Eduardo dos Santos
- Parties: DR Congo; Uganda; Angola

The Luanda Agreement is a 6 September 2002 ceasefire and normalization of relations between Uganda and Democratic Republic of the Congo (DRC), signed by their respective presidents, Yoweri Museveni and Joseph Kabila, and Angolan president José Eduardo dos Santos, in Luanda, Angola. It sought to end the ongoing Second Congo War and had far-reaching implications for regional peace. The Luanda Agreement became a baseline for peace accords in Africa and is viewed favorably by outside entities, such as the United Nations and the European Union.

The agreement was part of a larger peace process for the Second Congo War that also included the Sun City Agreement (17 April 2002 and 2 April 2003), the Pretoria Accord (30 July 2002), and the Global and All-Inclusive Agreement (16/17 December 2002).

== Background ==
The relationship between Uganda and the DRC was plagued by violence for decades. Uganda has been plundering the DRC of valuable minerals since the 1990s. The relationship is complicated by the ADF, a rebel group that attacked Western Uganda from the early 1990s well into the 2000s. Uganda President Yoweri Museveni blamed the DRC and the UN for the group's continued existence.

== Negotiations ==
In the context of the Second Congo War, Ugandan and DRC delegations held talks in 14–15 August 2002 in Luanda, Angola, mediated by Angola Foreign Minister João Miranda. They signed a memorandum of understanding on 15 August. A peace treaty was signed by Ugandan and DRC presidents Yoweri Museveni and Joseph Kabila on 6 September 2002 in Luanda, calling for the withdrawal of Ugandan troops. It was also signed by Angolan president José Eduardo dos Santos, and Angola was put in charge of verifying the implementation of the agreement. Uganda was given five days to withdraw from Beni, North Kivu, and Gbadolite, Équateur, and 100 days to withdraw two battalions from Bunia, Ituri District, Orientale.

== Implementation ==
On 24 September 2002, the United Nations Organization Mission in the Democratic Republic of the Congo (MONUC) confirmed that almost all of the around 2,000 Uganda People's Defence Force (UPDF) troops in Beni and Gbadolite have been withdrawn. On 27 September, the DRC and Uganda agreed to up a peace commission for the Ituri District to prevent security vacuum during the Ugandan withdrawal, and to stop the fighting between the Lendu and Hema people and between rebel groups. The scheduled launch of the Ituri Pacification Commission on 17 October 2002 was delayed, however. Kabila and Museveni met at a tripartite summit in Dar es Salaam, Tanzania, with Tanzanian president Benjamin Mkapa on 26 November 2002 to resolve their differences, and expressed their readiness to establish the commission.

At another summit in Dar es Salaam on 9–10 February 2003, Kabila and Museveni reaffirmed their commitment to the Luanda Agreement, and accepted an amendment to the agreement that added a new schedule for the IPC. With the change, the commission would begin its work on 17 February and finish on 20 March, by which point the 2,000 remaining UPDF troops would withdraw. However, on 6 March, the UPDF stormed the Ituri capital of Bunia to take it over from the Rwandan-aligned Union of Congolese Patriots (UPC), which had allied itself to Rally for Congolese Democracy–Goma (RCD–Goma) in January 2003. The city was captured by the UPDF after heavy fighting. The action increased tensions between Uganda and Rwanda. The UPDF accused Rwanda of sending troops into the DRC to fight alongside the UPC, in violation of the July 2002 Pretoria Accord, which Rwandan denied. However, it threatened to intervene. Uganda began withdrawing its troops on 24 April as UN more peacekeepers arrived in the region. The withdrawal was overseen by the UPDF chief of staff Maj. Gen. James Kazini and the Ituri operational commander Brig. Gen. Kale Kayihura.

== International Court of Justice ==
The Lusaka Ceasefire Agreement was a peace treaty to end the Second Congo War. All military operations were to halt and actions were to be taken to show respect for human rights and reconcile the relations among Angola, DRC, Namibia, Rwanda, Uganda, Zambia and Zimbabwe) in 1999. The International Court of Justice deemed this agreement a modus operandi rather than a legally binding agreement. The ICJ's treatment of the agreement is thought to have broader implications, because "the ICJ's authority in the interpretation of international law is likely to influence the perception of the parties to armed conflicts with regard to legal nature and effects of peace agreements...it threatens to undermine the crucial role of peace agreements in the resolution of armed conflicts." The interpretation of the Lusaka agreement thereby set a precedent that undermined the legal authority of the Luanda Agreement.

The Luanda Agreement is a bilateral agreement that directly alters the terms of the Lusaka Agreement. However, both agreements call for the explicit consent of the DRC to allow Ugandan troops on their land. This then led to multiple disputes within the ICJ between Uganda and the DRC. In 1999, the DRC filed three claims asserting that Uganda violated international laws:

(1) governing non-use of force, peaceful settlement of disputes, respect of sovereignty, and non-intervention
(2) rules of occupation, respect for sovereignty over natural resources, right to self-determination of peoples, and the principles of non-interference in domestic matters, and
(3) violated international legal obligations to respect human rights, including the obligation to distinguish between civilian and military objectives during armed conflict"

Uganda filed three counter claims: (1) the DRC used force against Uganda, (2) the DRC allowed attacks on Ugandan diplomatic premises and personnel in Kinshasa in violation of the law of diplomatic protection and (3) the DRC violated the 1999 Lusaka Agreement.

The court ruled that Uganda had violated DRC's territorial integrity and that Uganda was an occupying power, but granted Uganda's argument that the DRC had violated Ugandan diplomatic protection.

== Reaction ==
The European Union issued a statement applauding the Luanda Agreement as a mechanism to aid peace efforts. However, the EU also recognized that the continued fighting among the Congolese people as a reason for Uganda to continue to protect people through its presence.
