= Pretoria Accord =

2002 peace agreement

Peace Agreement Between the Government of the Democratic Republic of the Congo and the Republic of Rwanda
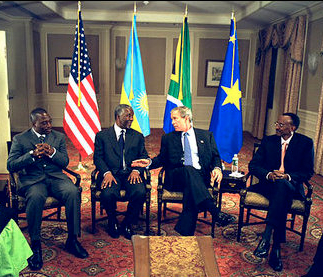
- Type: Memorandum of understanding
- Context: Second Congo War
- Signed: 30 July 2002
- Location: Pretoria, South Africa
- Mediators: Thabo Mbeki; Jacob Zuma
- Negotiators: Joseph Kabila; Paul Kagame
- Parties: DR Congo; Rwanda

The Pretoria Accord was signed by Rwanda and the Democratic Republic of the Congo (DRC) presidents Paul Kagame and Joseph Kabila on 30 July 2002 in Pretoria, South Africa, as part of the peace process to end the Second Congo War. Rwanda agreed to withdraw its troops from the DRC in exchange for international commitment towards the disarmament of the Hutu militia Interahamwe and ex-FAR fighters. Rwanda would present a plan for the withdrawal ten days after the accord, and the disarmament would begin 90 days after the signing. The Rwandan military withdrawal from the DRC would begin 45 days after that.

The Pretoria negotiations were mediated by South African president and deputy president Thabo Mbeki and Jacob Zuma. The accord was part of the larger peace process and was one of the multiple agreements leading to the end of the Second Congo War, along with the Sun City Agreement (17 April 2002 and 2 April 2003), the Luanda Agreement (6 September 2002), and the Global and All-Inclusive Agreement (16/17 December 2002). The withdrawal of Rwandan troops was completed on 5 October 2002. As of late 2005, thousands of Rwandan Hutu fighters had been disarmed and repatriated to Rwanda, with the assistance of the United Nations Organization Mission in the Democratic Republic of the Congo (MONUC), but some members of the Democratic Forces for the Liberation of Rwanda (FDLR) refused to surrender.

== Background ==
The Sun City Agreement, part of the efforts to end the Second Congo War, was initially concluded during February and April 2002 between Democratic Republic of the Congo (DRC) President Joseph Kabila's government, Jean-Pierre Bemba's Ugandan-backed Movement for the Liberation of the Congo (MLC), and the majority of unarmed opposition and civil society, with the support of Angola and Zimbabwe. However, it was rejected by the Rwandan-backed Rally for Congolese Democracy–Goma (RCD–Goma), effectively isolating itself and Rwanda. RCD–Goma was also joined by five unarmed opposition political parties. In May 2002, a massacre occurred in the city of Kisangani after a mutiny by RCD members resulted in deaths of civilians and soldiers. In the wake of these events, international mediators worked to restart the pace talks between all parties.

== Negotiations ==
The talks between Kabila and Kagame began on 11 July 2002 in Durban, South Africa, with the mediation of South African Deputy President Thabo Mbeki. They were held on the sidelines of the inaugural African Union summit. Talks resumed on 18 July in Pretoria, brokered by Deputy President Jacob Zuma. An understanding was reached on 23 July after five days of negotiations. A memorandum of understanding and an implementation schedule were signed on 30 July in the presence of Mbeki, Zuma, Malawian President Bakili Muluzi, South African Foreign Minister Nkosazana Dlamini-Zuma, and other officials. The signing took place as talks with the Rwandan-backed RCD–Goma were ongoing to create a new peace agreement for a transitional government, superseding the previous April 2002 Sun City Agreement, which did not involve group. Mbeki invited the group to start talks with the signatories of the accord, and coordinated the negotiations with RCD–Goma.

== Implementation ==
=== 2002 ===
Kabila and Kagame decided to meet once every month for the three months of the scheduled implementation to review the progress. The accord's Third Party Verification Mechanism held its first meeting in Kinshasa on 22 August 2002. On 16 September, Kabila and Kagame met with US President George W. Bush, Mbeki, and UN Secretary General Kofi Annan in New York City. At the meeting, Bush noted that his administration was committed to supporting the Pretoria Accord's implementation, and all four heads of state affirmed their commitment to it. Kagame addressed the United Nations Security Council that day, stating that the Rwandan withdrawal would begin "in approximately one week's time," and calling on the DRC to comply with its obligations under the accord.

The acting chief of staff of the Rwandan Patriotic Army (RPA), Major General James Kabarebe, issued orders on 17 September for the withdrawal from the DRC to begin on the following day, and for access to be granted to monitors that would verify the withdrawal. The United Nations Organization Mission in the Democratic Republic of the Congo (MONUC) confirmed the start of the withdrawal on that day. RCD–Goma leader Azarias Ruberwa said that the group would enter the areas that the RPA leaves. The pullout began with the RPA leaving Kindu and Kalima in the Maniema Province, and followed with the withdrawal from Kabalo, Kalemie, Kongolo and Nyunzu in northern Katanga Province. In the wake of RPA's withdrawal, a group identifying as a Congolese Mai-Mai militia raided villages near Kalima, causing 4,500 people to flee and killing or abducting multiple civilians, according to MONUC. Mai-Mai spokesmen accused RCD–Goma of being responsible for the attack, saying that the Mai-Mai declared a ceasefire to allow the RPA withdrawal.

On 20 September, DRC, Rwandan, South African, and UN officials met in Kigali, Rwanda, to discuss the status of the withdrawal and the repatriation of Rwandan Hutu ex-FAR and Interahamwe fighters. Nearly 2,000 fighters were disarmed and being held at the Kamina Air Base, while another 2,000 were in the area. A total of 81 at the Kamina base volunteered to be repatriated to Rwanda. According to DRC Communications Minister Vital Kamerhe, the rest of them (out of an estimated total of 12,000) were in territory held by RCD–Goma. Kabarebe announced that Rwanda's withdrawal was complete on 5 October, with the departure of the last group of soldiers from Goma in the province of North Kivu. On 7 October, MONUC stated that it was able to verify the departure of 20,941 Rwandan troops along with all of their weapons and equipment, compared to the 23,760 troops reported by Rwanda. The Rwandan military command explained that the remaining 2,819 were on leave or other assignments at the time of the withdrawal. MONUC verified that the withdrawal that began on 17 September was completed.

Fighting broke out after the RPA's withdrawal as the Mai-Mai and RCD–Goma tried to fill the vacated areas. The Mai-Mai took control of Uvira, South Kivu, from 13–18 October before it was retaken by RCD–Goma. The fighting in Uvira caused the displacement of 57,700 people. On 1 November, Kabila and Kagame met in Pretoria to review the progress. Rwanda expressed "repeatedly expressed concern about the Kinshasa government's backing of recent fighting in the east of the DRC and its failure to fulfill its commitments under the two agreements." The DRC accused Rwanda of leaving behind troops to assist the RCD rebels. The DRC had banned Rwandan armed groups operating on its territory and arrested Colonel Tharcisse Renzaho for his role in the 1994 Rwandan genocide, turning him over to the International Criminal Tribunal for Rwanda.

Also on 1 November, a mutiny occurred at the Kamina base when ten Hutus broke into an armory and killed seven Congolese Armed Forces soldiers. They were forcibly sent back to Rwanda, which caused 1,300 others to leave the base, hoping to avoid repatriation. Just 200 fighters remained after the mutiny out of the original 2,000 that had been living there for a year. According to MONUC, the first phase of the repatriation was completed 21 November, during which a total of 677 people were sent to Rwanda.

=== 2003 ===
Another meeting of the Pretoria Accord signatories occurred in Paris on 25 February 2003. During tensions between Uganda and Rwanda in March 2003, amid fighting in the DRC's Ituri District between the Uganda People's Defence Force and the Rwandan-aligned Union of Congolese Patriots, Rwanda was accused of sending troops back into the country. The Third Party Verification Mechanism denied the claim. Another summit meeting of the signatories took place in New York City on 25 September. At another summit in Pretoria hosted by Mbeki and Chairperson of the African Union Joaquim Chissano on 28 November, Kabila and Kagame agreed that the repatriation Hutu fighters to Rwanda should be completed within twelve months. William Swing, the Special Representative of the UN Secretary General of the DRC, was also there to represent the Third Party Verification Mechanism.

=== 2004 ===
On 19 January 2004, William Swing visited Rwanda and informed the Kagame government that Hutu fighters in North Kivu were holding 3,000 people hostage to prevent repatriation. By then, 5,056 former combatants and their dependents had been repatriated. MONUC personnel were deployed into the forests to inform the Hutus that it was safe to return to Rwanda.

=== 2005 ===
Leaders of the Hutu Democratic Forces for the Liberation of Rwanda (FDLR) milita announced in March 2005 that they would stop fighting and accept repatriation. MONUC established three demobilization centers in the Kivu provinces, but only 60–70 fighters arrived there each month. A core group of hardliners remained, and they prevented a larger number of mid- and lower-ranking members from leaving. "Thousands" of fighters had been repatriated since 2002, and as of September 2005, MONUC had facilitated the return of 6,896. President Joseph Kabila set a deadline for remaining combatants to leave the country before military operations would begin to expel them on 30 September 2005, after a meeting with the DRC's Independent Electoral Commission and the International Committee in Support of the Transition (CIAT).

A joint operation was launched in Virunga National Park of North Kivu involving some 550 MONUC and 2,000 Armed Forces of the Democratic Republic of the Congo (FARDC) personnel. On 9 November, a MONUC spokesman announced that 336 men had surrendered, of which 17 were Rwandan while the rest were Congolese Mai-Mai militiamen.

== Reactions ==
The accord was seen favorably by Belgium, France, the United Kingdom, and the United States.
