= Second Congo War =

1998–2003 war in central Africa

- Part of the Congolese Civil Wars and the aftermath of the First Congo War and the Angolan Civil War
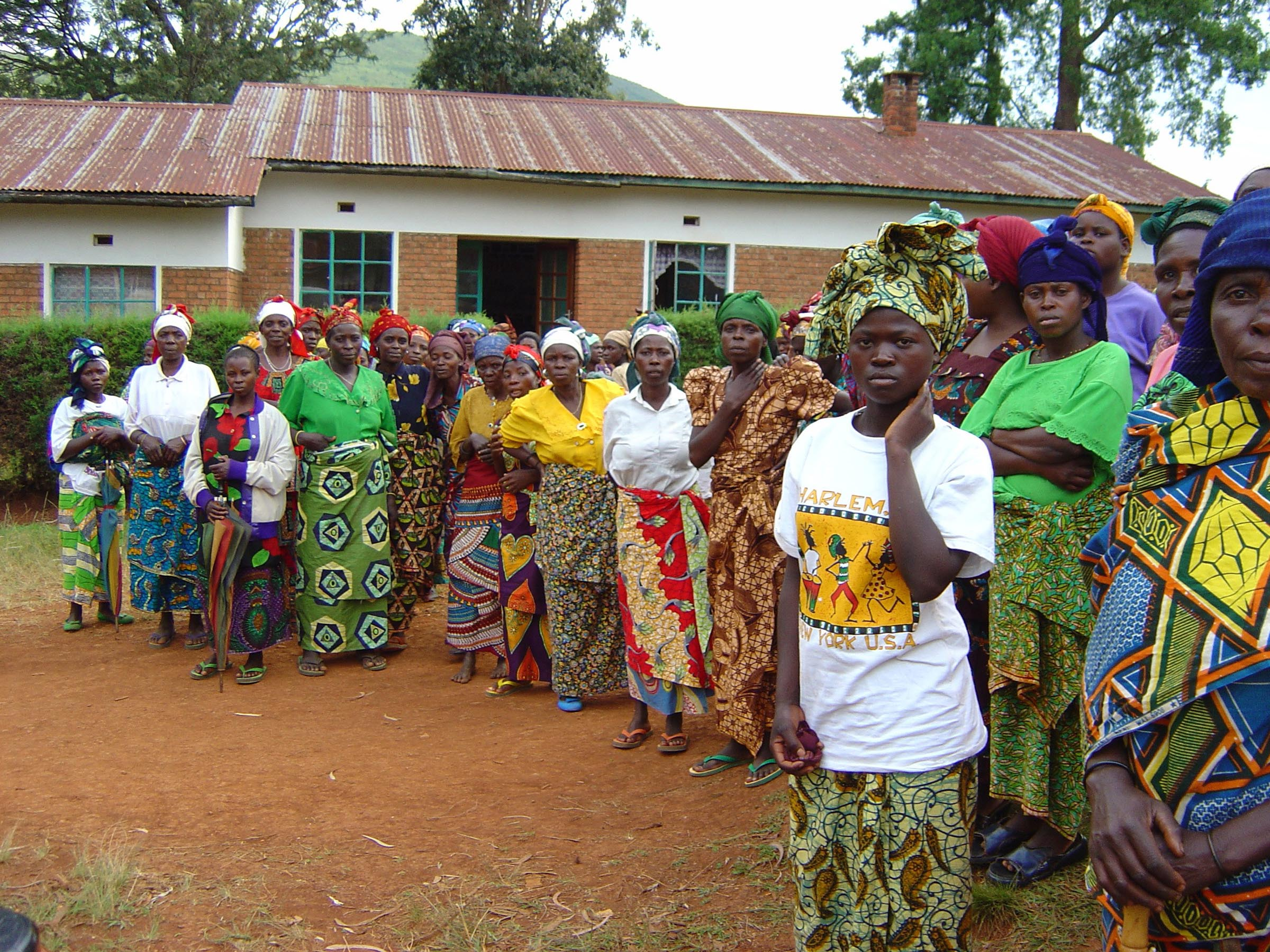
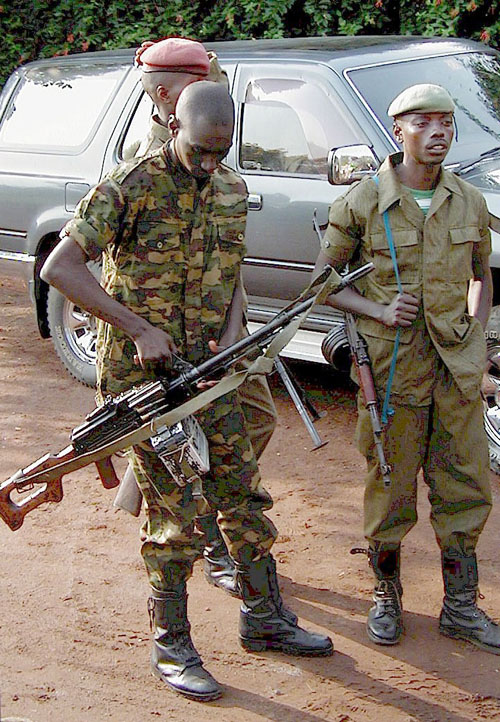
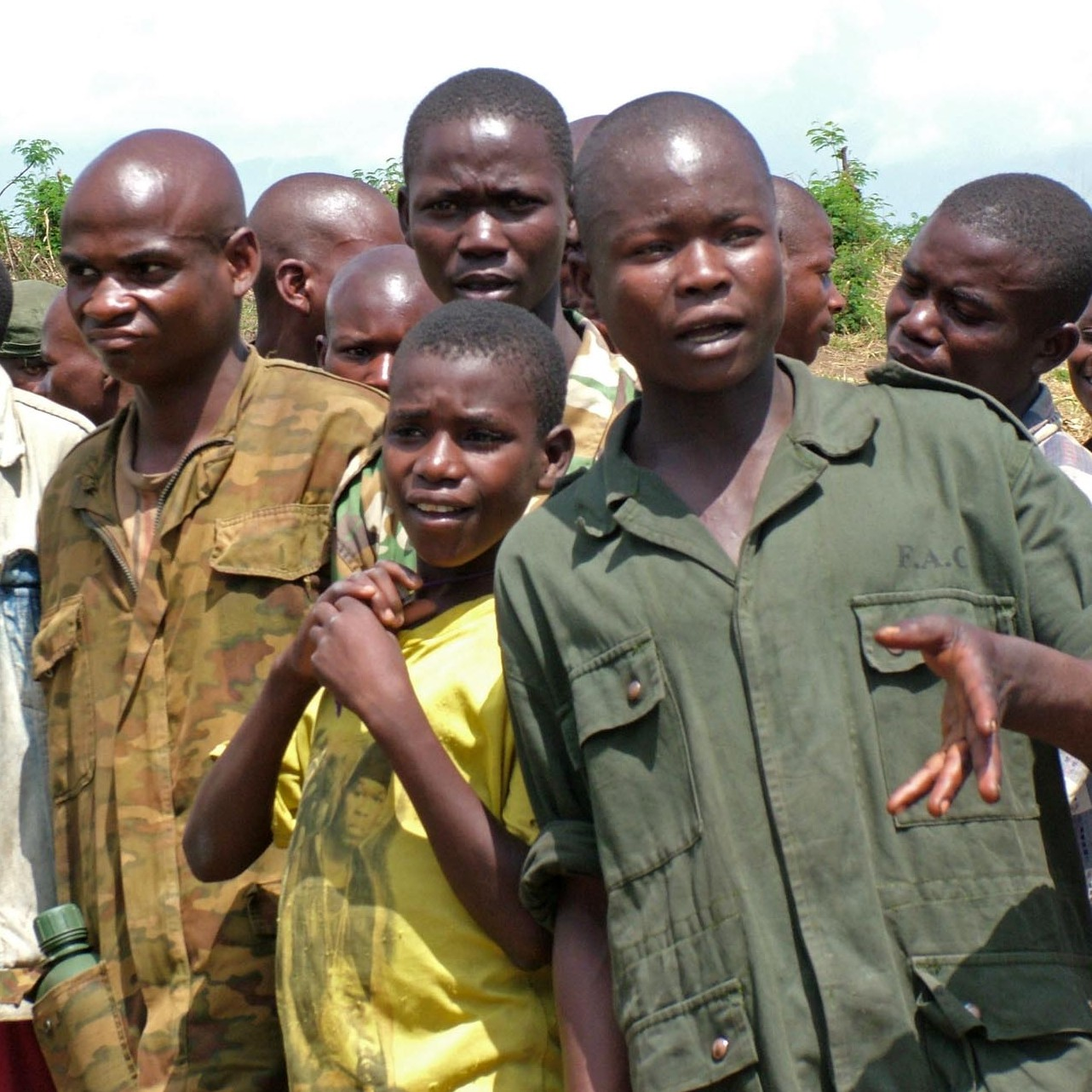
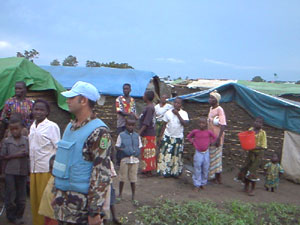
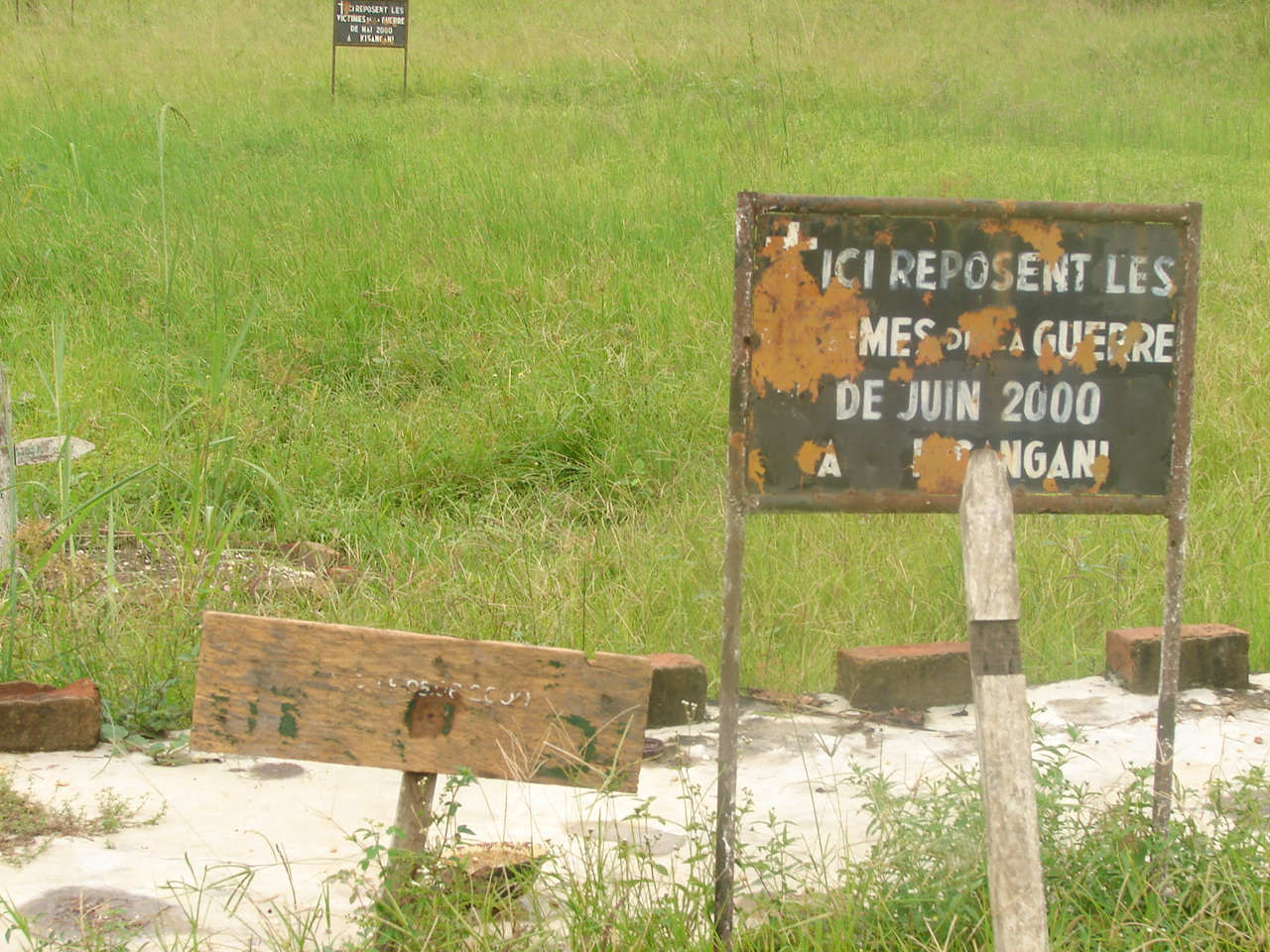
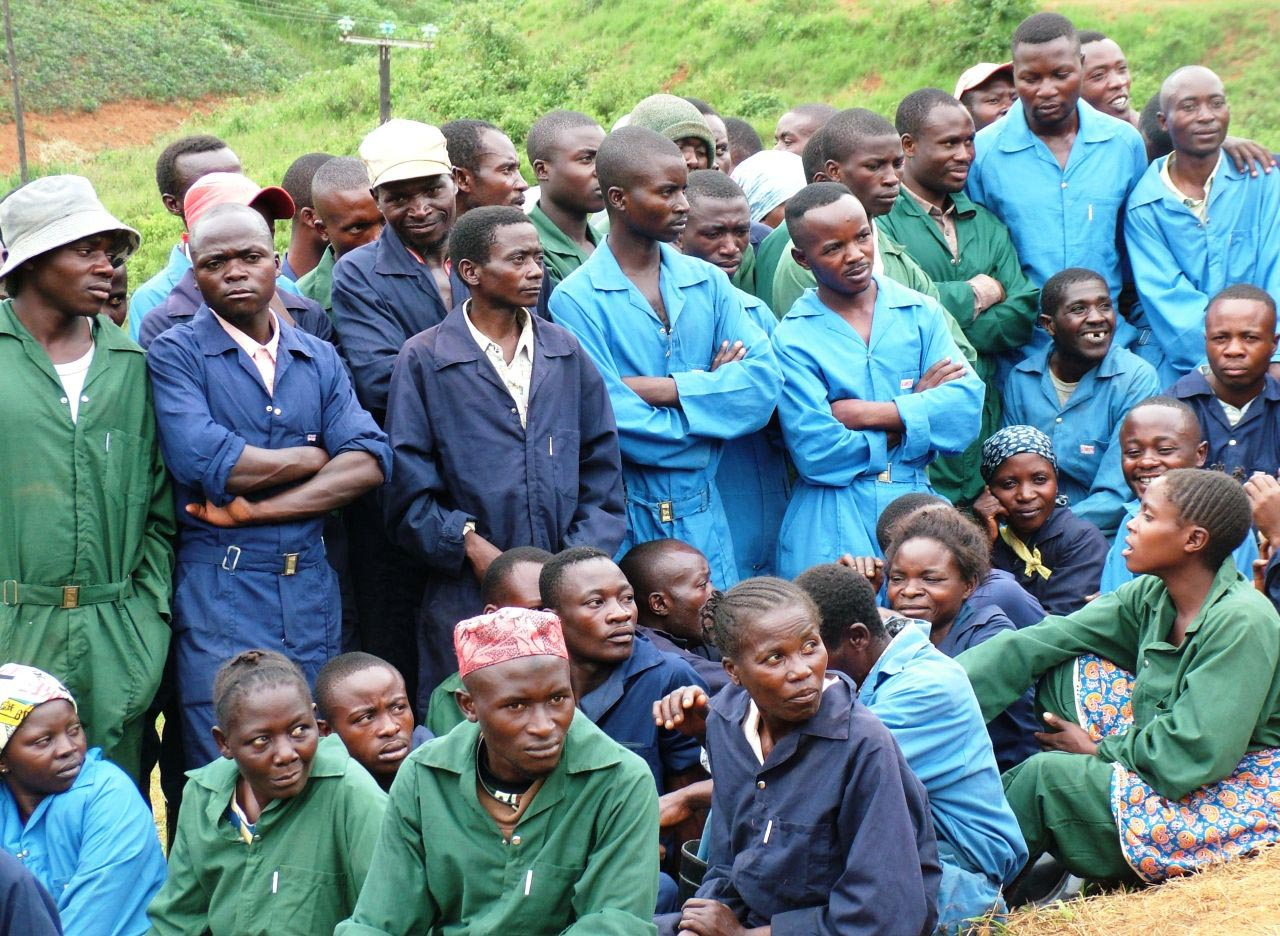
- From top to bottom, left to right: Rape victims who have been successfully reintegrated into their communities assemble in a "peace hut" near Walungu, South Kivu; Congolese soldier adjusting a PKM, 2001; Former child soldiers in the eastern DRC; A UN peacekeeper visiting an internally displaced persons camp in Bunia; A memorial cemetery for the Six-Day War (2000); Ex-combatants of the Mai-Mai militias
Date	2 August 1998 – 18 July 2003 (4 years, 11 months, 2 weeks and 2 days)
Location	Democratic Republic of the Congo
Result	Military stalemate: Assassination of Laurent-Désiré Kabila; Sun City Agreement; Creation of a unified, multi-party government in DR Congo, with Joseph Kabila as president; Pretoria Accord; Rwandan withdrawal from DR Congo in exchange for commitment towards the disarmament of Hutu militias.; The Transitional Government of the Democratic Republic of the Congo is established, deployment of MONUC.; End of the Angolan Civil War.; Continuation of the Ituri conflict.; Start of the Kivu conflict.

Belligerents
Pro-government: Democratic Republic of the Congo; Angola; Chad; Namibia; Zimbabwe; Sudan (alleged); Libya; Anti-Ugandan forces: LRA; ADF; UNRF II; FNI; Anti-Rwandan militias: FDLR; (Rwanda) ALiR; Interahamwe; RDR; Mai-Mai; Other Hutu-aligned forces; Anti-Burundi militias: CNDD-FDD; FROLINA	Rwandan-aligned militias: RCD; RCD-Goma; Banyamulenge; Ugandan-aligned militias: MLC; Forces for Renewal; UPC; Other Tutsi-aligned forces; Anti-Angolan forces: UNITA; Foreign state actors: Uganda; Rwanda; Burundi

Commanders and leaders
(Democratic Republic of the Congo) Laurent-Désiré Kabila X; (Democratic Republic of the Congo) Joseph Kabila; (Democratic Republic of the Congo) Eddy Kapend; (Democratic Republic of the Congo) Faustin Munene; (Democratic Republic of the Congo) Sylvestre Lwetcha; (Democratic Republic of the Congo) Dieudonné Kayembe; (Namibia) Sam Nujoma; (Namibia) Dimo Hamaambo; (Namibia) Martin Shalli; (Zimbabwe) Robert Mugabe; (Zimbabwe) Emmerson Mnangagwa; (Zimbabwe) Constantine Chiwenga; (Zimbabwe) Perrance Shiri; (Angola) José Eduardo dos Santos; (Angola) João de Matos; (Chad) Idriss Déby	MLC Jean-Pierre Bemba; RCD Ernest Wamba dia Wamba; RCD Emile Ilunga; RCD Azarias Ruberwa; Jonas Savimbi; António Dembo; (Uganda) Yoweri Museveni; (Uganda) Jeje Odongo; (Uganda) James Kazini; (Uganda) Kale Kayihura; (Rwanda) Paul Kagame; (Rwanda) Kayumba Nyamwasa; (Rwanda) James Kabarebe; (Burundi) Pierre Buyoya

Strength
(Democratic Republic of the Congo) 45,000–55,000 troops Mai Mai: 20,000–30,000 militia ALiR: 30,000–40,000 militia FDD: 16,000 militia (Namibia) 1,600–2,000 troops (Zimbabwe) 14,000 troops (Angola) 8,000 troops (Chad) 1,000 troops	RCD-Goma: 40,000; MLC: 20,000; RCD-ML: 8,000 (Rwanda) 25,000 troops (Uganda) 13,000 troops (Burundi) 7,000+ troops

Casualties and losses
- 5.4 million+ excess deaths (1998–2007); 350,000+ violent deaths (1998–2001); 1 UN observer killed

The Second Congo War, (Note: French: Deuxième guerre du Congo) also known as Africa's World War or the Great War of Africa, was a major conflict that began on 2 August 1998 in the Democratic Republic of the Congo (DRC), just over a year after the First Congo War. The war initially erupted when Congolese president Laurent-Désiré Kabila turned against his former allies from Rwanda and Uganda, who had helped him seize power. The conflict expanded as Kabila rallied a coalition of other countries to his defense. The war drew in nine African nations and approximately 25 armed groups, making it one of the largest wars in African history.

Amid rumors of a Rwandan-backed coup plot against Kabila, he ordered all Rwandan troops to leave the country on 27 July 1998. Banyamulenge Congolese Tutsi soldiers, feeling threatened by the move, declared a rebellion against Kabila on 2 August, which received Ugandan and Rwandan backing. During August, Rwandan troops and Congolese defectors made an attempt to seize Kinshasa and overthrow Kabila. It was stopped by the intervention of Zimbabwean and Angolan troops, and by the Kabila government's ethnic incitement campaign that pitted Kinshasans against Tutsis. The attackers then fought their way to UNITA territory in northeast Angola, from where they flew back to Rwanda.

Having failed in the air assault against Kinshasa, Rwanda turned to a conventional strategy. Rwandan troops and Congolese RCD rebels overran eastern Congo's North Kivu and South Kivu provinces beginning on 2 August 1998. They captured Kisangani in Orientale Province on 23 August, which expanded the fighting to northern Congo and led to Uganda deploying its troops to the region. The MLC rebel group later emerged there, and Chadian troops were sent to stop the Ugandan-backed rebel advance. After the initial fighting, Rwandan and RCD forces advanced into the central and southern DRC, but Kindu became the main focus, as the Kabila government wanted to use it for a counteroffensive into the Kivus. However, the city was taken by rebels from Congolese government troops on 16 October 1998. Fighting also occurred in the southern DRC's Katanga Province.

Ugandan troops were present in Kisangani and Équateur Province, while Rwandan and Burundian control extended from the Kivus to parts of Katanga. There were no significant territorial changes from November 1998 until mid-1999, as both sides prepared for a battle over the strategic central city of Mbuji-Mayi. Rwandan and rebel troops began their offensive in February 1999. In June, the offensive got closer to the city, causing a crisis for Kabila and international pressure on Rwanda to negotiate. The Lusaka Peace Agreement of July and August 1999 was the result. It largely stopped movement on the front lines, but fighting continued. The war became a stalemate, with the 2,400-km front line running from around Mbandaka, northeast of Kinshasa, to Mbuji-Mayi in the Kasaï region, and to northern Katanga Province. Besides the conventional warfare between armies at the front, guerilla groups such as the Interahamwe and Mai-Mai were active behind the front, and there was also inter-ethnic fighting. Rwanda faced increasing resistance in the occupied territory, which was many times its size.

After the assassination of Laurent-Désiré Kabila in January 2001, the peace process resumed under his successor Joseph Kabila, culminating in the Global and All-Inclusive Agreement of 17 December 2002 and the Final Act of the Inter-Congolese Dialogue of 2 April 2003. Although the war officially ended on 18 July 2003 with the establishment of the Transitional Government of the Democratic Republic of the Congo and the raising of the DRC's flag in the rebel-controlled city of Goma, violence has persisted in various regions, particularly in the east, through ongoing conflicts such as the Lord's Resistance Army insurgency and the Kivu and Ituri conflicts. The Second Congo War and its aftermath caused an estimated 5.4 million deaths, primarily due to disease, malnutrition and war crimes, making it the deadliest conflict since World War II, according to a 2008 report by the International Rescue Committee. The conflict also displaced approximately 2 million people, forcing them to flee their homes or seek asylum in neighboring countries. Additionally, the war was heavily influenced and funded by the trade of conflict minerals, which continues to fuel violence in the region.

== Background ==
=== Local and regional instability ===
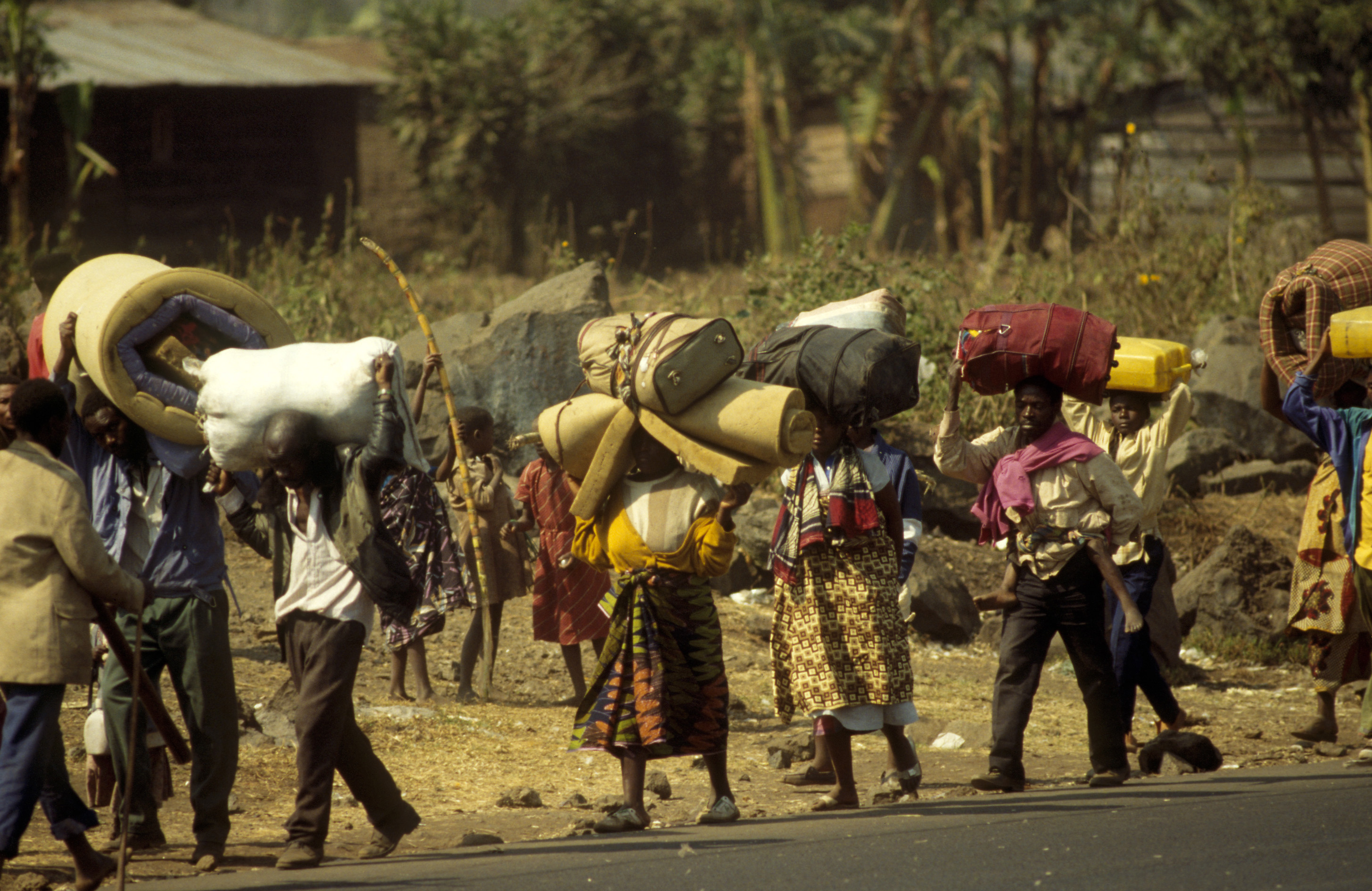
Rwandan refugees entering Goma, North Kivu, Zaire, in August 1994

The war had its roots in the democratization of Zaire that began on 24 April 1990 and conflicts involving the Banyarwanda, a term for Kinyarwanda speakers with origins in Rwanda that had migrated in waves to the Kivu region of the present-day Democratic Republic of the Congo (DRC). The Banyarwanda population includes those that arrived before the colonial period, and those that arrived before and after Congo achieved independence from Belgium in 1960, including ethnic Tutsi and Hutu. The Belgians had encouraged Rwandan migration as a form of cheap labor. There was a conflict involving the Banyarwanda in the early 1960s, but it was followed by decades of calm when Mobutu Sese Seko was in power. The nationality status of the Banyarwanda remained unclear, and they were outside of the indigenous tribal structure that formed Congolese local government, which was also connected to land rights. The National Sovereign Conference was convened between 1991 and 1993 as part of Mobutu's liberalization in order to draft principles for the country's future. During the conference, representatives of local civil society from the Kivus questioned the "Zaireans of dual or doubtful citizenship," referring to Banyarwanda. Confrontations took place between the Banyarwanda and the region's "indigenous" ethnic groups (the Hunde, Nande and Nyanga) in 1991 and 1992. The disputes involved questions over citizenship, land, and customary tribal authority.

In March 1993, fighting escalated between the two sides in the Walikale Territory of North Kivu, and both blamed each other: the Banyarwanda claimed that the indigenous wanted to massacre them, while the indigenous believed that the Banyarwanda (and the Hutu in particular) wanted to take their territory, which they allegedly saw as "Ancient Rwanda." Order was later restored for several months, when Mobutu visited the region and brought units of the Special Presidential Division, which calmed the situation. But Zaire experienced an influx of 255,000 Hutu refugees from the Burundian Civil War into South Kivu starting in October 1993, and 1.5 million Hutu refugees from the Rwandan Civil War into both Kivus starting in July 1994, the latter following the Rwandan genocide of Tutsis between April and July 1994. Although they were largely civilians, there was a political and military leadership among them that intended to fight an insurgency against their respective countries' governments. The Rwandan Hutu genocidaires among the refugees spread their anti-Tutsi ideology and formed militias such as the Interahamwe, the Rally for Democracy in Rwanda (RDR), and the Army for the Liberation of Rwanda (ALiR). Burundian and Rwandan insurgents—including Interahamwe and ex-Rwandan Armed Forces (FAR)—were able to acquire weapons and training with the support of the Zairean state, and launched cross-border raids against the Rwandan Patriotic Army (RPA) in western Rwanda throughout 1995.

The influx had other destabilizing effects: the Banyarwanda and the Rwandan refugees became the majority of North Kivu's population, and there was increased pressure on the environment and infrastructure. Additionally, the alliance between the Tutsis and Hutus ended, and the two groups entered into conflict, like in Rwanda. The Zairean government announced in August 1995 that the refugees would be expelled at the end of that year, before going back on the policy under international pressure. However, this caused many Rwandan Hutu refugees to leave the camps and to settle in other areas, which brought them into conflict with Tutsi Banyarwanda, and also created fears among Zaireans that North Kivu was being turned into a Hutu territory. Violence broke out in November 1995 as Hutu militias killed Hunde and Tutsi people, and Hunde militias killed Tutsi and Hutu people. The Zairean government did nothing to prevent the massacres. Poorly paid regular troops from the Zairean Armed Forces (FAZ) participated in looting and fought on the side of the Hutus for economic reasons.

=== First Congo War ===
During early 1996, the Rwandan press close to the RPA reported that Rwandan Vice President Major General Paul Kagame was planning a war to end the Mobutu regime and the security problem for Tutsis posed by the Hutu refugee camps in Zaire. Earlier, in 1995, Kagame had recruited several thousand Zairean Tutsis (including Banyamulenge from South Kivu), and it was these men that launched the precipitating event of the First Congo War — the "Banyamulenge rebellion" of September 1996. The Banyamulenge were Tutsis of Rwandan and Burundian origin that had lived in South Kivu since the 18th or 19th centuries. Some were veterans of the Rwandan Patriotic Front (RPF), the exiled movement that won the Rwandan Civil War and ended the genocide in 1994. Although the Banyamulenge had genuine grievances, including attacks on them by militias, the decision to launch what became the First Congo War was made in Kigali, Rwanda; not in South Kivu. The RPA was making preparations for a war in Zaire as of June 1996. On the night of 31 August 1996, a group of "Banyamulenge infiltrators" got into a firefight with Zairean commandos near Luberizi. During September the RPA was seen moving equipment into South Kivu, and the Banyamulenge armed themselves and began their rebellion that month. The Banyamulenge rebellion has been described as the extension of the Rwandan Civil War into Zaire.

Zaire accused Rwanda and Burundi of stirring up a conflict in South Kivu on 13 September 1996. Mobutu's dictatorship culminated in the collapse of the Zairean state, which had practically lost the ability to defend its borders during the 1980s and early 1990s. Although a large army on paper, the unmotivated FAZ was unable to prevent the Banyamulenge from taking over South Kivu with RPA support by the end of October 1996. The conflict also spread to North Kivu in the form of Rwandan attacks on the refugee camps. During a press conference that month, Rwandan President Pasteur Bizimungu appeared with maps that he used to claim that the Banyamulenge land was historically part of Rwanda. Kagame later said that Rwanda would react to "Zairean aggression," and circulated a document calling for a "Berlin Conference II". The first phase of the war was completed by the start of 1997, when an occupied zone was established along Zaire's borders with Rwanda, Burundi, and Uganda, extending into Zaire's interior as far west as the Walikale Territory. On 18 October 1996, the Alliance of Democratic Forces For the Liberation of the Congo-Zaire (AFDL) was established to provide political cover. When Kagame and Ugandan President Yoweri Museveni tried to find a "suitable Congolese" to lead the movement in the first half of 1996, Tanzanian politician Julius Nyerere suggested the anti-Mobutu rebel exile Laurent-Désiré Kabila, who started off as the AFDL's spokesman.

The next phase of the First Congo War occurred when Angola provided assistance to the AFDL, reportedly after members of Mobutu's regime sold equipment to the UNITA rebels, in violation of a previous agreement between the two countries. The Angolan Armed Forces (FAA) airlifted the Katanga Gendarmerie, which had been in exile in Angola and integrated into the military there, to Rwanda, from where they were sent into Zaire. This intervention caused the rebellion to expand from the east into the rest of the country, as the Gendarmes had a critical role in the capture of major cities. The AFDL and its backers completed the takeover of Zaire between February and May 1997. Kabila's new government received widespread international recognition after the collapse of the Mobutu regime. Kabila declared himself president and changed the country's name from Zaire to the DRC when he reached the capital Kinshasa on 17 May, and declared the Congolese Third Republic at his inauguration on 29 May 1997.

=== Expulsion of former allies ===
After taking power, Kabila sent former FAZ soldiers to "reeducation" camps, and the AFDL were initially supported for having ended the abuses of the FAZ. However, the status of the Banyarwanda and the security problem posed to neighboring states had still not been resolved. RPA and Burundian troops were still deployed in the east, and initially most of the Congolese troops there were Tutsi (Banyamulenge or Banyarwanda). Their presence and actions increased anti-Tutsi sentiment. When ex-FAZ soldiers entered service in Kabila's new Congolese Armed Forces (FAC), they were distinct in that they had conventional military training, in contrast to the AFDL fighters. They were hostile to their former enemies, and in the eastern DRC, ex-FAZ officers wanted to break up Banyamulenge units in February 1998, so that they could be dispersed throughout the country. This occurred during ongoing attacks against their villages by local militias called the Mai-Mai, who were opposed to the Rwandan presence and were allied to Interahamwe elements. The Banyamulenge saw this as a threat, and the situation only deescalated in March after negotiations by the FAC chief of staff, the Rwandan-Ugandan officer James Kabarebe.

The situation remained tense, and the region saw looting and massacres committed by the RPA and their allies from 1997 to 1998, mostly against civilians. Although the DRC and Rwanda had signed an agreement in September 1997 for joint operations between the FAC and the RPA against the Mai-Mai and Interahamwe, the non-Tutsi FAC elements had no interest in doing so, and cross-border raids into Rwanda continued. In the spring of 1998 Rwanda and Uganda were planning military action. Increasingly portraying himself as a Congolese nationalist, Kabila became wary of Rwanda's influence and suspected that some Tutsi members of the AFDL were advancing Rwandan rather than Congolese interests. Amid rumors of a Rwandan-backed coup plot against him, Kabila dismissed Kabarebe as military chief on 13 July 1998, and on 27 July he ordered all Rwandan troops to leave the country, during a television address in which he thanked the Rwandans for their "solidarity" and the Congolese people for "tolerating and sheltering" them. The departure of the Rwandan troops made the Banyamulenge feel threatened and accelerated the rebellion, which had been in the planning stage since earlier that year. On 28 July, Kabarebe returned to Rwanda and started planning another invasion of the DRC with Kagame.

== Course of the war ==
=== 1998 ===
The situation in the Congo in August 1998, by the time of Operation Kitona: Blue – Democratic Republic of the Congo and allies Red – Rwanda's allies Yellow – Uganda's allies

During the Rwandan military withdrawal, on 2 August 1998, FAC 10th Brigade commander Sylvain Mbuki entered a radio station in Goma, North Kivu, to announce that the Congolese military has "taken the decision to remove President Laurent-Désiré Kabila from power." The next day, the FAC 12th Brigade joined the uprising, and with support from Rwandan troops, the rebels quickly took over Goma, Bukavu, and Uvira without resistance. Fighting broke out south of Uvira, and there were also clashes beyond the Kivus: in Kindu, Kisangani, and across the country. In Kinshasa, Banyamulenge fought with other FAC soldiers at the Kokolo and Tshatshi military camps. By 3 August, the RPA was seen moving across the border, and all critical targets in the Kivus fell in the first 48 hours. In Kinsangani the rebels were defeated, in the Kinshasa area the Banyamulenge and remaining Rwandan soldiers were killed. It was not until 5 August that Arthur Z'ahidi Ngoma emerged as a "coordinator" of the rebellion, and an organization was formed on 12 August, the Rally for Congolese Democracy (RCD). Ernest Wamba dia Wamba became the RCD's elected president, and its leadership included several former AFDL officials that had served under Kabila.

On 4 August, under the command of James Kabarebe, the first Rwandan military planes landed at Kitona Air Base in Bas-Congo Province. Rwandan and Ugandan forces launched a surprise air assault operation in the western DRC's Bas-Congo, relatively close to Kinshasa. It contained the seaport of Matadi and the Inga dams, which the capital depended on for food and electricity. Kabarabe won over the ex-FAZ troops who were at Kitona to his side and together they quickly took over the region, turning off the electricity to Kinshasa on 11 August. Kabila fled the capital for Lubumbashi in Katanga Province with some of his ministers. Anti-Tutsi killings began in Kinshasa as Kabarebe's forces advanced and the government mobilized "popular self-defense" forces. The international community saw the crisis as a foreign invasion more than a rebellion. The president's son Joseph Kabila represented him at a Southern African Development Community (SADC) summit in Harare on 19 August, which authorized the deployment of Angolan, Zimbabwean, and Namibian troops. Kabila received more foreign support than Mobutu had, which became critical because the FAC was in no better condition than the FAZ had been.

On 20 August, Zimbabwean troops began arriving in Kinshasa, and on 22 August Angolan ground and air forces began entering Bas-Congo from Cabinda, where they defeated the attackers. The FAA intervention retook much of Bas-Congo in 48 hours, and cut off Kabarebe from resupply. His remaining forces were evacuated by plane from Matadi to airfields in UNITA-controlled Angola. From there they were flown to Rwanda. Kabila returned to the capital on 25 August, and the foreign troops and crowds of civilians in Kinshasa killed remaining rebels that tried to infiltrate the city. By the end of the month, the western DRC was stabilized. However, more towns in the east fell in rapid succession, and the rebels spread out from there towards the Orientale and Équateur provinces in the north, Katanga in the south, and into the central DRC, where they were strengthened by defections of FAC soldiers. The important diamond center of Kisangani, the largest city in the tropical woodlands of Congo, fell to the rebels on 23 August. The northern front was manned by RCD rebels with the support of the Uganda People's Defence Force (UPDF), while the southern front was largely RPA troops, with some UPDF support. Uganda deployed soldiers into Kisangani to take control of critical infrastructure there, fearing that the region could be used by Sudan to attack it.

In September 1998, Sudanese and Chadian forces arrived in the northern DRC and attempted to stop the Ugandan-backed rebel advance. The fighting was mainly between Chadian and Ugandan troops. On 30 September 1998, a new Ugandan-backed rebel group, the Movement for the Liberation of Congo (MLC) was founded, led by Jean-Pierre Bemba. Uganda had its own proxy force in the form of the MLC, and distanced itself from Rwanda's RCD. With Ugandan backing, and the MLC took over the Équateur Province from the FAC and its Chadian allies, beginning from mid-November 1998. Uganda occupied parts of Orientale and Équateur. After the initial fighting, the Maniema Province capital Kindu became the main focus of both sides. The Kabila government intended to use it for a counter-offensive into the east. Kindu was defended by a Congolese government garrison that largely consisted of Rwandan ex-FAR and Ugandan fighters, and it was taken by a force of largely Rwandan and Ugandan troops on 16 October 1998, after a week of heavy fighting. This opened the road to Mbuji-Mayi in the diamond-rich Kasaï region, the only government territory that still produced revenue.

The fall of Kindu caused Angola and Zimbabwe to increase their military contingents in the DRC to prevent the fall of the Mbuji-Mayi and the Kasaï region. On 6 November, Kagame publicly admitted for the first time that official Rwandan forces were assisting RCD rebels for "security reasons," supposedly after a request by South African President Nelson Mandela to advance peace talks. During October and November, the RCD and its Rwandan allies advanced through Katanga, capturing towns along the shore of Lake Tanganyika and reaching as far south as Pweto near the Zambian border. Kabalo was the site of a major battle. Congolese troops backed by Zimbabwean forces, Rwandan Interahamwe/ex-FAR, and Burundian FDD insurgents fought against RCD rebels backed by Rwandan and Burundian troops. There were no significant territorial advances after November 1998, though fighting continued. There were multiple peace summits and negotiations held during 1998, mostly organized by SADC, including at Victoria Falls (7–8 August 1998 and 8 September 1998); Pretoria (23 August 1998); Paris (Francophonie summit from 26–29 November 1998); and Durban and Ouagadougou (Organization of African Unity in December 1998), all without any breakthroughs.

=== 1999 ===
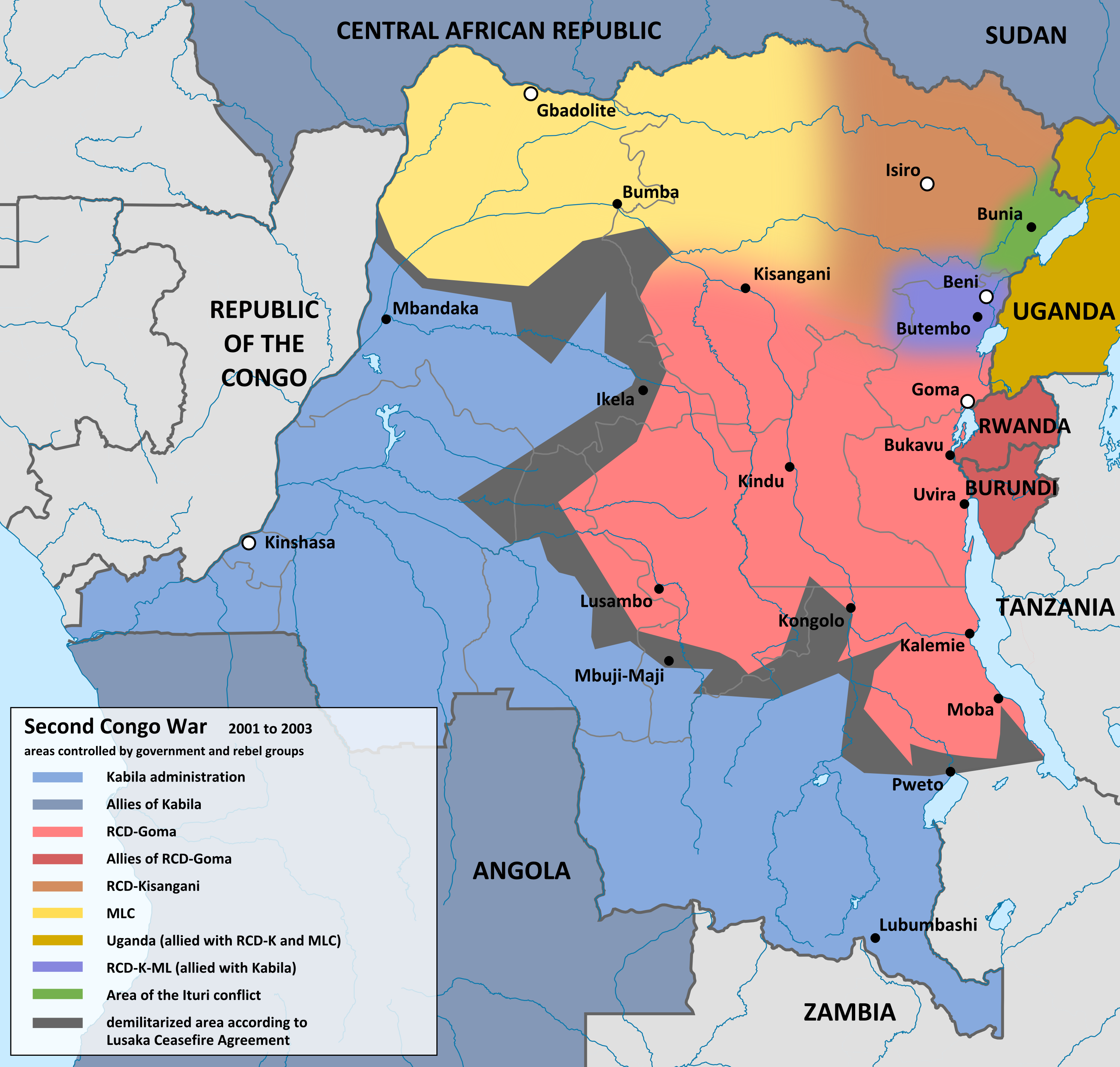
An estimate of territorial control from the Lusaka Peace Agreement in mid-1999 until the end of the war in 2003.

In early January 1999, Angola and Namibia airlifted FAC troops to Bangui, Central African Republic, to mount an offensive against the MLC and UPDF in northern Congo, following the MLC's capture of Gemena on 30 December 1998, which threatened the capital. Under pressure from Sudanese and Chadian forces, with a smaller number of Congolese FAC troops, Bemba's rebels (whose ranks included many CAR nationals) and Uganda were made to withdraw. At a summit in Windhoek, all belligerent countries agreed on 14 January 1999 to sign a ceasefire agreement within a few weeks, but the peace process slowed down because there was no agreement between the sides on the definition of belligerent. The Kabila government did not want responsibility for the non-state groups fighting on its side, while Rwanda and Uganda wanted the RCD to be the only representative of the rebels. In February 1999, the rebel coalition launched their only combined offensive of the war, with over 60,000 men (including the MLC, RCD, UPDF, and RPA). The targets of the offensive in the north included Gbadolite, Mbandaka, and Kinshasa; in the south they included Mbuji-Mayi, Lubumbashi, and Kamina. The RCD expanded its control in Katanga and fought against Zimbabwe National Army counterattacks, but the offensive soon lost momentum.

The FAC, despite its weaknesses, put up a stronger fight than the FAZ had in the First Congo War, and it had allies. As the FAC was being built up, the Kabila government heavily relied on Mai-Mai militias of young volunteers that resisted the foreign occupation. They were reckless, violent, and poorly organized, but were also responsible for many of the victories attributed to the government. The Mai-Mai became a major problem for the Rwandans as they tried to advance in the Kasaï and Katanga, and they carried out massacres in retaliation during late 1998 and early 1999. Murder, theft, carjacking, highway robbery, rape, arson, and looting became frequent occurrences in the Kivus. Life became so difficult that many people tried to take refuge in the forests, where they died from disease and lack of healthcare. The FAC tended to not commit atrocities like the rebel side did because it did not face civilian resistance, with the exception of its January counteroffensive in Équateur, where Bemba had popular support. The government's air forces, however, killed civilians in bombing raids.

On 5 April 1999, RCD leader Wamba dia Wamba moved his base from the de facto rebel capital of Goma to the Uganda-controlled city of Kisangani to head a breakaway faction of the RCD known as the RCD-Kisangani-Movement for Liberation (RCD/K-ML), later called Forces for Renewal; this move was a split from the dominance of the ethnic Banyamulenge in the RCD. The pro-Rwanda faction that stayed in Goma became known as Rally for Congolese Democracy–Goma (RCD–Goma). Further distancing from the original RCD occurred when Ugandan president Museveni and Kabila signed a ceasefire accord on 18 April in Sirte, Libya, under the mediation of Libyan leader Muammar al-Gaddafi, a summit in which both the RCD and Rwandan government refused to take part. The Sirte agreement mainly served as a reason for Chad to withdraw its troops. On 16 May, Wamba was ousted as head of the RCD in favor of a more pro-Rwanda figure, Emile Ilunga. Seven days later, the various factions of the RCD began to clash over control of Kisangani. On 8 June, rebel factions met to try to form a common front against Kabila, but despite these efforts, the occupying armed forces of Uganda recreated the Ituri Province, based on the old province of Kibali-Ituri which had previously existed from 1962 to 1966. Perceived favoritism to the ethnic Hema by Ugandan forces, including the appointment of a Hema provincial governor, sparked the still ongoing (as of 2026) ethnic clash of the Ituri conflict, sometimes referred to as a "war within a war".

Peace talks continued, but on 15 June, Rwandan forces crossed the Sankuru River and captured the Kasaï-Oriental town of Lusambo. The river had been the last natural obstacle between the RPA and Mbuji-Mayi. By early July they expanded their bridgehead, bringing them to 75 km outside the city, and they made advances elsewhere along the front. These developments created a crisis for Kabila, who stood to lose the economically and strategically important Kasaï region, which would cut him off from the mineral-rich Katanga Province and would open a path for the RPA to Kinshasa. Rwanda stopped its advance under immense international pressure, and a summit was convened at Lusaka on 24 June involving all parties (with the exception of Burundi, the Mai-Mai groups, and Rwandan and Burundian insurgents). The Lusaka Peace Agreement, signed by six heads of state by 11 July, was a ceasefire negotiated over two weeks. For the rebel groups, the MLC signed the ceasefire on 1 August, and the RCD initially refused but eventually signed on 31 August. Tensions between Uganda and Rwanda escalated and nearly derailed the Lusaka summit. Units of the UPDF and the RPA clashed in Kisangani on the morning of 7 August 1999. Fighting again broke out on the evening of 14 August, occurring throughout much of Kisangani, including in the airport and on major roads. The conflict lasted until 17 August, when a ceasefire was called that day. Both sides used heavy weapons during these clashes. The fighting was a result of differences over the objectives and strategies used during the war.

Under the terms of the agreement, a special Joint Military Commission (JMC) was created on 10 July 1999 to oversee the tracking, disarming, and documenting of armed groups in the Congo, especially those forces identified with the 1994 Rwandan genocide, with the cooperation of all sides in the conflict. The "negative" militias such as the Rwandan ALiR and the Burundian FDD were singled out. The agreement also called for a national dialogue involving all Congolese political forces, the withdrawal of foreign troops and their replacement with a UN mission, and the creation of a democratic transitional government. The terms were considered unrealistic and were not implemented on schedule due to the belligerents' non-compliance, but they were seen as a framework for an eventual resolution to the war. The Lusaka agreement temporarily stopped the fighting between conventional armies, such as in Équateur and Katanga, but acts of violence, looting, and other atrocities continued in the eastern DRC. In November, government-controlled television in Kinshasa claimed that Kabila's army had been rebuilt and was now prepared to fulfill its "mission to liberate" the country. The FAC fought a counteroffensive in Équateur against the MLC between October and December. After a garrison that included Zimbabwean and Namibian soldiers was encircled at Ikela, the FAC and the Zimbabwe Defence Forces made an unsuccessful attempt to break them out in November. They were later allowed to evacuate after negotiations. In December, the RCD, RCD-ML, and MLC signed an agreement in Kabale to form a united front against Kabila.

=== 2000 ===
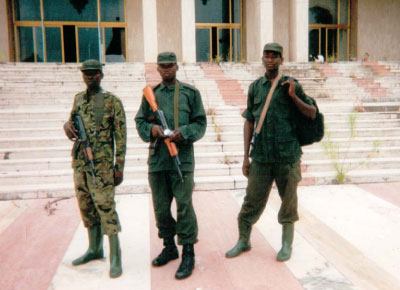
Rebel soldiers in Gbadolite, birthplace of Mobutu, in September 2000

By 24 February 2000, the UN authorized a force of 5,537 troops to monitor the ceasefire, under a body created on 30 November 1999, the United Nations Organization Mission in the Democratic Republic of the Congo (MONUC). The Lusaka agreement marked the end of major movements along the front, but UN monitors could not be deployed because fighting continued: in Equateur, which was mostly controlled by Bemba and the UPDF; in the Kasaï region, where the Rwandan forces consolidated their positions around Mbuji-Mayi; and in Katanga, where the FAC attempted to break through to Lake Tanganyika and the Kivus. In March 2000, the Kabila government started airlifting supplies for guerilla fighters in the east. That same month, Rwandan forces reached within several kilometers of the railway that connects Katanga to Kinshasa via the river port of Ilebo. The FAC and ZDF launched a counterattack in response, in the area of Kabalo and Kongolo. After new troops completed their training with North Koreans in April, in May the FAC launched another attack against the MLC. It was intended to protect the town of Mbandaka on the Congo River, which contained a port and airfield that could be used for an advance on Kinshasa.

Fighting occurred between the UPDF and RPA again in Kisangani on 5 May 2000, and on larger scale in June, during the Six-Day War. During the fighting from 4–11 June, at least 60,000 residents fled the city while heavy combat was going on. The Lusaka process slowed the rebel advances enough to buy time for Kabila to rebuild his army, and in July 2000 he was considering abandoning it altogether. Kabila did not want to share power in his government with the rebel leaders. By early August, the FAC had advanced 200 km northwards in Équateur. On 9 August 2000, a government offensive in along the Ubangi River was repulsed near the town of Libenge by MLC forces. The MLC sank a ferry carrying hundreds of Congolese soldiers. Zimbabwe began pulling out its troops in the fall of 2000, and the FAC was unable to hold against UPDF artillery, which allowed the MLC to recapture its territory by early October. Fighting continued in the region into the following year. In Katanga, FAC, ZDF, FDD, and Interahamwe forces briefly captured Pepa during October, though it was recaptured by RPA/RCD forces in November, with heavy casualties for the Congolese government. This defeat led to the capture of Pweto by the Rwandans on 4 December.

As of December 2000, neither side was able to achieve a decisive victory, and the focus of the war became the consolidation of positions along the 2,400 km front line. The front stabilized, extending from Mbandaka in the northeast to Mbuji Mayi in central Kasaï, and to Kananga and Pweto in Katanga. It was not a true front, because there were not enough troops for Congo's vast territory, so it consisted of pockets of soldiers with large empty areas in between. Soldiers were clustered around logistical assets such as ports, airports, and the few roads in usable condition. They marched through the jungle and savannah to launch attacks, and were cut off from supplies, taking from civilians. Rwanda was advancing in Katanga, having captured Pweto in December, though it was unable to capture Lubumbashi to the west. Rwanda also advanced in Kasaï but could not capture Mbuji-Mayi or Kanaga. Uganda threatened Mbandaka (a few days away from Kinshasa by river), but was unable to capture it due to the presence of Angolan troops. Through the end of 2000, large-scale and deliberate atrocities were carried out against Congolese civilians in the east, mainly by the RPA/RCD. Meanwhile, the DRC's economy was collapsing: Doctors Without Borders reported that the "total collapse of the economy" was causing food prices to skyrocket in the major cities, including Kinshasa.

=== 2001 ===
==== Assassination of Laurent-Désiré Kabila ====
On 16 January 2001, Laurent-Désiré Kabila was shot and killed at the Palais de Marbre in Kinshasa. The government initially stated that Kabila was wounded but still alive when he was flown to Zimbabwe for intensive care. The circumstances of his assassination are unclear, and have been the subject of considerable rumors and disagreements. The consensus is that Kabila was shot by one of his bodyguards, an 18-year-old former kadogo (child soldier) named Rashidi Mizele. The assassin's name had previously been misidentified as "Rashidi Kasereka". Two days later, the government announced on state television that desperate attempts to save Kabila had failed, and that Kabila had died from his wounds. Shortly after the assassination, the French newspaper Le Monde published a story in which self-identified assassination plotters revealed documents and details of the plot to murder Kabila. The plotters were mainly kadogos who had been under Kabila's command since 1996, and were aggrieved over their poor treatment. The catalyst for the assassination appeared to be the execution of 47 kadogos accused of plotting against Kabila. The execution, witnessed by Kabila, took place the day before his assassination.

While the role of the disgruntled kadogos is relatively well-established, there have been some attempts to argue that they were under the influence of external actors who sought to overthrow Kabila. Some Congolese officials attempted to implicate their principal enemies by alleging that Rwandans masterminded the operation. Some observers have lent credibility to these allegations, including Al Jazeera's documentary, Murder in Kinshasa, which claims that a Lebanese diamond dealer organized the logistics of the assassination. Others have speculated that Angolans were involved in the assassination, due to Kabila's complicity in helping the anti-Angolan government rebel group UNITA channel funds through Congo. It has even been asserted that Americans were involved in the assassination.

==== Joseph Kabila becomes president ====

Joseph Kabila (right) on a visit to Kasaï-Occidental, c. early 2000s.

Joseph Kabila replaced his father as acting president, being selected by his former advisors—most notably Colonel Eddy Kapend, Justice Minister Mwenze Kongolo, and Interior Minister Gaëtan Kakudji. They held a meeting after Kabila's assassination and decided that his son, Joseph, is the candidate that is acceptable to all sides. He was said to be less hard-line than his father and wanted to negotiate peace. Joseph Kabila was sworn in on 26 January, and did not give an address at the inauguration, only reading a short oath. Later that evening he appeared in a prerecorded speech on Congolese television. Kabila inherited a country on the verge of economic and political collapse, with an estimated per capita income that was believed to have fallen to be the lowest in Africa. His government was dependent on foreign troops, while the eastern DRC was occupied other foreign powers. Having spent his early life abroad, Joseph Kabila had no domestic support base, and turned to the international community. While insisting on the withdrawal of foreign troops, Kabila told UN Special Envoy Kamel Morjane that he wanted to achieve national reconciliation and establish peace.

Joseph Kabila was described as "a more adept political leader than his father". He gave diplomats "hope that things have changed", in contrast to Laurent-Désiré Kabila, who "stood as the major impediment to a peaceful settlement of the war". During his first foreign trip, Kabila visited Paris and met French President Jacques Chirac on 31 January, where he expressed support for the Lusaka Peace Agreement and having a dialogue with rebel groups, while maintaining the territorial integrity of the DRC. He then visited the United States on 2 February, where he addressed the United Nations Security Council in New York City, speaking about the necessity of reviving the Lusaka agreement that was negotiated by his father but not implemented.

He also met with US Secretary of State Colin Powell in Washington, D.C., and with Rwandan President Kagame. The George W. Bush administration in the United States was more evenhanded during the peace efforts than the Bill Clinton administration had been. Colin Powell stated that "the US will not support any solution for the Congo crisis which would not respect its territorial integrity." On 15 February, Kabila revived the Lusaka agreement and facilitated the deployment of MONUC. The ceasefire monitors began deploying in March, and as a show of goodwill, Rwanda and Uganda pulled back their troops. Kabila appointed his supporters into key posts in March, replaced most of his father's cabinet in April, and lifted his father's ban on political parties in May. He also took measures to revive the economy, increase foreign investment, and restore commerce on the Congo River. The latter began in June with the arrival of UN naval patrol boats. The inter-Congolese dialogue started on Kabila's initiative, with its first "pre dialogue" meeting on 20 August in Gaborone. On 15 October, the first dialogue meeting began in Addis Ababa, and lasted until 19 October. It was announced on 4 December 2001 that the dialogue would resume in Sun City, South Africa. Other diplomatic meetings later took place in Abuja (7–8 December 2001), Brussels (14–17 January 2002), Blantyre (14 January 2002), and Geneva (4–8 February 2002).

=== 2002 ===
==== Peace agreements ====
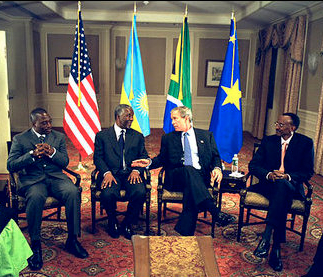
Joseph Kabila, Thabo Mbeki, George W. Bush, and Paul Kagame, in New York City, September 2002

The inter-Congolese dialogue in Sun City convened on 26 February 2002. The meeting confirmed that Joseph Kabila would remain president until elections could be organized, despite the opposition of RCD–Goma, and led to the Sun City Agreement, a power-sharing deal signed on 17 April between the government and the MLC. The latter group also opened up freedom of movement and trade between the Équateur province and the government-controlled areas. This restored boat traffic on the Congo and Ubangi Rivers, and air travel between the region's cities, bringing relief to the civilian population and increasing pressure on RCD–Goma. The group and its Rwandan backers were becoming increasingly isolated. In March, during the Sun City talks, the RCD-Goma faction captured Moliro, a town on the coast of Lake Tanganyika, from government forces. The Sun City dialogue ended on 17 April with the government and MLC partial agreement, which would have made Jean-Pierre Bemba the prime minister of a transitional government that would draft a new constitution and hold elections.

A number of RCD–Goma troops began a mutiny on 14 May, calling for Rwandan troops to be expelled by Congolese. This caused violent clashes in Kisangani during which RCD–Goma committed atrocities, including the massacre of 183 people. Some of the victims were decapitated before their bodies were thrown into a river. In June, there was fighting between the RPA and anti-Rwandan Banyamulenge in South Kivu. At the end of that month Kabila declared that the Sun City Agreement was "dead" and that he would seek a more inclusive dialogue. Under international pressure, RCD–Goma entered the power-sharing talks, and during July, Joseph Kabila and Paul Kagame held talks in South Africa brokered by the country's President Thabo Mbeki and Deputy President Jacob Zuma. The resulting Pretoria Accord was signed by Kabila and Kagame on 30 July. The accord called for the disarming and repatriation of the Rwandan genocidaires who were in the DRC while Rwanda withdrew its troops.

The Pretoria Accord accelerated the peace process, with the World Bank pledging a loan to the DRC and Zimbabwe starting its troop withdrawal in August. Talks in Luanda, Angola, that month led to the signing of the Luanda Agreement on 6 September by Kabila and Ugandan president Yoweri Museveni for the withdrawal of Ugandan troops. The treaty stipulated that Uganda would withdraw its troops from Bunia, the eastern city at the heart of the Ituri conflict between the Lendu and Hema, but implementation proved troublesome. Eleven days later, on 17 September the first Rwandan soldiers were withdrawn from eastern Congo, which later caused an outbreak of violence as RCD–Goma and the Mai-Mai fought over the vacated territory. On 5 October, RPA chief of staff Major General James Kabarebe announced the completion of its withdrawal. MONUC confirmed the departure of over 20,000 Rwandan soldiers. Kagame complied with the Pretoria Accord under US pressure. That month, Burundi also withdrew most of its troops, and plans were made for Kabila and Burundian president Pierre Buyoya to sign a similar accord. Angola, Namibia, and Zimbabwe announced their withdrawal would be complete by 31 October, though a 50-man Zimbabwean force had remained in Congo to protect Kabila. Uganda maintained two battalions in Bunia, Ituri District, to maintain order and protect civilians amid fighting between local militias.

Mai-Mai and Banyamulenge forces under Patrick Masunzu seized control of Uvira from RCD–Goma on 13 October, holding it until on 18 October. Gabriel Amisi Kumba, who directed the Kisangani retaliation after the 14 May uprising, and placed in charge of mopping up anti-RCD elements in Uvira. The inter-Congolese talks resumed on 26 October in Pretoria, and even though the meeting was officially UN-mediated, and it was in effect a continuation of the dialogue. Mbeki and Moustapha Niasse exerted pressure on the participants during the difficult negotiations. The meeting concluded with the signing on the night of 16/17 December 2002 of the Global and All-Inclusive Agreement (AGI). It called for the creation of the DRC Transitional Government to draft a new constitution, organize elections, and build a unified national army. Kabila was its president, and other positions would be divided between his administration, the MLC, the RCD, and the civilian opposition. The AGI was the formal end of the war, though it was not completely over. An additional 3,200 peacekeepers were approved also in December, for the expansion of MONUC to about 8,700 personnel.

==== Pygmy genocide ====
From the end of 2002 through January 2003, around 60,000 Pygmy civilians and 10,000 combatants were killed in an extermination campaign known as Effacer le tableau (French pronunciation: [efɑse lə tablo], lit. 'erase the board') by the MLC rebel group. Human rights activists have made demands for the massacre to be recognized as a genocide.

=== 2003 ===
On 27 January 2003, the first commercial river barge arrived from Kinshasa in RCD-held Kisangani since the war started. Ugandan troops remained in the DRC in early 2003 at the request of the UN to protect civilians from ongoing fighting, as over a dozen militias were active in the Orientale Province's Ituri District: some backed by Rwanda, some by Uganda, and some independent. On 6 January, the formerly pro-Ugandan Union of Congolese Patriots (UPC) reached an agreement with RCD–Goma, allying itself with Rwanda. The move was seen as a threat by Uganda. The fighting among various armed groups delayed the implementation of the Luanda Agreement. In February, Kabila and Museveni reaffirmed their commitment to the Luanda terms for Uganda's withdrawal and the creation of the Ituri Pacification Commission as a regional administration. The UPDF stormed the regional capital Bunia on 6 March, taking it over from UPC, and Rwanda threatened to deploy its troops, accusing Uganda of forming an alliance with "genocidal" forces. The UPDF and others accused Rwanda and Burundi of sending troops into Congo to fight alongside the UPC, in violation of the Pretoria Accord, a claim that was rejected by international ceasefire monitors. A ceasefire among the factions in Ituri was signed on 18 March, though the UPC refused to join it.

The Ituri Pacification Commission was inaugurated on 4 April. Under international pressure, Uganda began withdrawing its troops on 24 April as MONUC peacekeepers arrived, and completed the withdrawal on 2 June. As Ugandan troops left, fighting erupted between ethnic militias in Bunia, and the UPC retook control of the city. A peace agreement involving the UPC, other groups, and the Kabila government was signed on 16 May. Meanwhile, there was a debate among the Inter-Congolese Dialogue participants in Pretoria about implementing their agreement during early 2003. Continued disagreement delayed the formation of the Transitional Government. The Congolese received a draft transitional constitution and a mechanism for setting up a national army on 6 March from Niasse and Mbeki, who wanted to end the arguing. They accepted it on 1 April, and on 2 April, the participants of the ICD signed the Final Act to set up the Transitional Government, which was given up to two years to hold elections. They also endorsed the AGI. Kabila promulgated the transitional constitution that had been agreed on 5 April, and was sworn in as transitional president on 7 April. The vice-presidents were chosen, and RCD leader Azarias Ruberwa arrived to take up his position on 28 April, declaring an official end to the war. However, the swearing in of the Transitional Government was delayed by several weeks because of continued disagreements.

On 30 June, the transitional cabinet was named just before the deadline set by the AGI, which was the DRC's 43rd anniversary of independence on 1 July. The vice-presidents were sworn in on 17 July, and the members of the cabinet were sworn in on 18 July, inaugurating the Transitional Government. RCD leader Ruberwa said that "the process has begun, there is no turning back ... we are together now as partners and not as belligerents." The flag of the DRC was raised in RCD-held Goma on 23 July, which was also seen as a sign of the war coming to an end. However, some MLC and RCD cabinet officials argued over the wording in the oath, and after it was modified, they were sworn in on 24 July. The transitional Senate and the National Assembly were also formed in July, and the first session began on 22 August 2003. The setting up of the other new institutions was a drawn-out process that continued into the following year. On 25 September 2003, the DRC, Rwanda, Uganda, and Burundi signed the Principles on Good Neighborly Relations and Cooperation at the UN, which sought to make binding commitments for respecting territorial integrity and ending support for armed groups.

== Foreign involvement ==
=== Anti-government ===
Belligerents of the Second Congo War: Violet – Democratic Republic of the Congo Orange – anti-DRC coalition Dark blue – pro-DRC coalition Light blue – DRC allies, not directly involved in the war. Green – DRC supporters politically

Rwanda initially denied any involvement in the rebellion in the DRC, but announced that it would intervene because of the massacres of Tutsis in Kinshasa and other Congolese cities. Rwanda and Uganda had similar security concerns: destroying the bases of the Rwandan Hutu fighters and the Sudanese-funded Allied Democratic Forces militia that launched attacks into Uganda. They were also involved in exploiting the mineral resources in the Kivus. Museveni announced in 1998 that Uganda occupied eastern Congo airports to prevent Sudan from using them. Relations between Rwanda and Uganda worsened during 1999 and 2000, because Museveni saw Kagame (the president of Rwanda from April 2000) as arrogant. There was also rivalry between the two countries over the exploitation of the DRC's mining industry. Burundi had fewer troops deployed than the others, to fight Burundian rebels and to secure the trade route through the DRC that bypassed the regional boycott of the country.

The extension of the Rwandan Civil War into Congolese territory did not end with the Pretoria Accord of July 2002. Although it pulled out its official troops in September 2002, an unofficial force continued to operate in the DRC both to fight Hutu militants and to exploit the country's mineral resources. The ALiR was defeated in 1998, but ex-FAR remnants reformed as the Democratic Forces for the Liberation of Rwanda (FDLR) in 2000, creating a pretext for Rwanda to continuing intervening in the DRC.

The DRC filed a case against Rwanda, Uganda, and Burundi for armed aggression in violation of the UN Charter at the International Court of Justice on 23 June 1999, demanding that they withdraw. However, the DRC dropped the claims against Rwanda and Burundi on 30 January 2001. The DRC filed another case against Rwanda on 28 May 2002, accusing it of "genocide against more than 3.5 million people," and requested provisional measures from the court. The ICJ rejected the request on 10 July 2002, and later ruled on 3 February 2006 that the court had no jurisdiction for the case. On 19 December 2005 the ICJ ruled that the DRC's sovereignty had been violated by Uganda, and that the DRC had lost billions of dollars' worth of resources. The DRC has asked for $10 billion in compensation.

=== Pro-government ===
As SADC members, Zimbabwe, Namibia and Angola had an obligation to defend the DRC, another member state. However, other members of SADC chose to neutral. Zimbabwe and the DRC were linked through economic arrangements between the Mugabe and Kabila families, and between Zimbabwe Defence Industries and the DRC's Gécamines. President Robert Mugabe was the first to respond to the DRC's request for help in August 1998, dispatching elements of the Zimbabwe National Army and organizing the SADC summit. Mugabe, perhaps the most ardent supporter of intervention on Kabila's behalf, was the only major player involved in the conflict able to marshal a reasonably modern and experienced air force. Zimbabwe's military was also regarded as being one of the more well-equipped and professional of the region; it was the decisive factor in the outcome of the war. Zimbabwean strategy revolved around defending the person of Laurent Kabila only with allied forces, as Congolese forces were thought to be unreliable, retaking important settlements. Mugabe's initial buildup in Kinshasa consisted of special forces along with some paratroops, before receiving reinforcements. They were accompanied by some Soviet-manufactured T-54/55 tanks, Crocodile armoured personnel carriers, and EE-9 Cascavel scout cars flown into the capital on Angolan Air Force planes. The contingent grew to 3,800 around November, and peaked at 12,000–14,000 in January 2001. The Zimbabweans began leaving in 2002 and had completely withdrawn by the end of the year.

The Air Force of Zimbabwe made particularly effective use of its air power, hitting rebel and Rwandan offensives on Mbuji-Mayi with repeated strikes by BAE Hawks and Hawker Hunters. It also sustained heavy losses during the conflict, including three of its six Mil Mi-24 Hind helicopters, a transport aircraft, and an unidentified interceptor, probably a Chinese Chengdu J-7. Despite the effectiveness of its highly mobile, big-gunned Eland-90 and Cascavel armoured cars, Zimbabwean ground forces also lost a significant number, either captured or destroyed by the rebel coalition.

Under the direction of President Sam Nujoma, Namibia became involved in the Congo on behalf of its commitment to SADC. Nujoma, a longtime ally of Kabila, claimed he could not refuse the requests for military assistance from Zimbabwe and Angola. In February 1999, Namibian Defence Force personnel in the Congo were organised around an infantry battalion group with staff, artillery, logistics support, and a flight of Aérospatiale Alouette helicopters and Y-12 transport aircraft from the Namibian Air Force. Between 2000 and 2001, this figure may have fluctuated between 1,600 and 2,000, by which point 30 servicemen had been killed in action, and the war effort was costing Namibia $150,000 a day. The Namibian intervention was greeted with intense criticism by opposition parties, as well as neighboring South Africa and several Western donors. The European Union expressed concern that Nujoma was misusing his country's development funds for the Congo expedition, and individual member states—including Finland—cut off financial aid. A furious diplomatic row also ensued with South African authorities after they suspended all outgoing military exports to Namibia.

The Angolan government had previously fought against Mobutu Sésé Seko in the First Congo War due to his support for the rebel group UNITA during the Angolan Civil War (1975–2002). Angola also supported Denis Sassou Nguesso in 1996 in the Republic of the Congo and had a military presence there, which, combined with its presence in the DRC, gave it control of the Atlantic coast and its oil reserves. Kabila had originally discounted the possibility of support from Françafrique (Francophone Africa), but after a summit meeting in Libreville, Gabon on 24 September 1998, Chad agreed to send 1,000 troops. France had encouraged Chad to join the war effort as a means of regaining influence in a region where the French had retreated. The Chadian troop deployment was by Libya. Unconfirmed reports in September 1999 indicated that forces of the government of Sudan were fighting rebels in Orientale Province, close to the Sudanese and Ugandan borders. However, Sudan did not establish a significant military presence inside the DRC, though it continued to offer extensive support to three Ugandan rebel groups fighting against the government of Uganda—the Lord's Resistance Army, the Uganda National Rescue Front II, and the Allied Democratic Forces—in retaliation for Ugandan government support for the Sudan People's Liberation Army.

== Aftermath and legacy ==
=== Casualties and continuing conflicts ===
The International Red Cross estimated that a total of 3.8 million people died as a result of the Second Congo War in the period from August 1998 to April 2004, and a total of 5.4 million died from August 1998 to April 2007. At least 350,000 people were directly killed by the fighting as of 2001. Malnutrition and disease caused most of the deaths, exacerbated by the war due to the collapse of the DRC's healthcare system and the disruption to livelihoods. The IRC stated in January 2008 that the war and its aftermath caused more deaths than any other conflict since World War II. A UN Panel of Experts stated that the number of excess deaths directly attributable to Rwandan and Ugandan occupation in the five eastern provinces of the DRC from the start of the war until September 2002 was between 3–3.5 million. It also described the widespread internal displacement of populations in the DRC as the highest ever recorded in Africa.

The fragility of the state has allowed continued violence and human rights abuses in the east.

- Kivu conflict: Hutu insurgents of the FDLR remained active, and Rwanda intervened either directly or by proxy. Congolese Tutsi officers led by Laurent Nkunda refused to integrated into the new national military (the FARDC) in July 2003, with Rwandan backing, and went into rebellion against the government in February 2004. The FARDC's initial defeat by the rebels led it to make an alliance with the FDLR, and Nkunda founded the CNDP movement in July 2006 to protect ethnic Tutsis. Rwanda transferred its support to the CNDP from the RCD-Goma, which performed badly in the 2006 elections and whose soldiers were either demobilized, or joined the FARDC or CNDP.
- Ituri conflict: The historic ethnic conflict between Lendu and Hema peoples escalated due to Rwandan-Ugandan intervention and disagreements, causing the emergence of over a dozen militias in the Ituri District by February 2003. The UN peacekeepers initially deployed to Ituri were unable to maintain order. The fighting was reduced in 2005, when most of the militiamen were disarmed, though some remained active.
- Katanga insurgency: Katangan Mai-Mai militias were organized by Kabila in 1998 and were left out of the 2002 peace talks. Fighting broke out between them and the government in November 2002.

As of 2004, 31,000 people in the DRC were dying every month due to war-related causes, and this increased to 45,000 per month as of 2007.

==== Dispute ====
The Human Security Report Project (HSRP) of Simon Fraser University has challenged the toll of 5.4 million war-related deaths between 1998 and 2008. It states that of the IRC's five periodic estimates, two that cover a period from 1998 to 2001 are flawed, and the reported 2.6 million deaths therein should not be included in the total death toll. The other three periodic IRC estimates cover a period from May 2001 – April 2007, and in which 2.83 million of the total 5.4 million deaths were reported. The HSRP argued that the estimates were built on a general death rate that was far too low for Congo, and that most of those people would have most likely died anyway. Thus, the IRC figure should be revised to 860,000 total war-related excess deaths. In response to the criticism from HSRP, one of the authors of the IRC report acknowledged small statistical discrepancies in the original study, but argued that the report had been widely peer-reviewed and was judged to be an accurate estimate of the war-related excess deaths.

=== War crimes ===
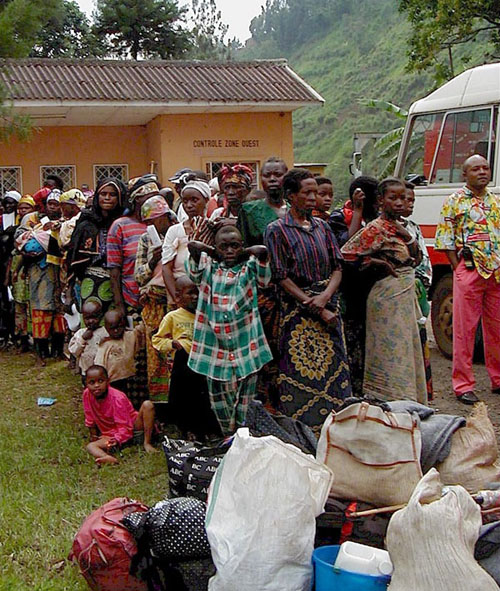
A meeting of victims of sexual violence in the Democratic Republic of the Congo.

During the war, sexual violence against women and the conscription of children as soldiers or forced laborers were widespread. On 17 January 2003, through its ambassador to the UN, the DRC requested a criminal court to try "all persons presumed to be responsible for acts of genocide or other serious violations of international humanitarian law" during the war. The International Criminal Court investigation began in 2004.

=== Economic impact ===
The deteriorated infrastructure and constant threat of attacks made overland travel impossible, causing internal trade in Congo to come to a standstill. On the Congo River, the most important remaining transport route, there was no ship traffic between the different power regions for years. Isolated villages were cut off from urban markets, while cities suffered from food shortages. In Kinshasa, food prices quadrupled within a year. International aid arrived only sparingly. Initially, it was mainly limited to Kinshasa and it was not until 2001 that it reached the actual war zones in the east. A survey by civil society groups in Butembo found that unemployment was widespread, with 90% of the population living on a few cents a day and eating one meal a day.

The impoverishment of the population worsened further. A 2006 study by the Congolese government, three years after the end of the war, revealed that 76% of the population could not send their children to school, 79% were malnourished, 81% did not have adequate housing, and 82% had no access to medical care. Overall, 71% of the population lived in absolute poverty, 85% in the poorest province of Équateur. According to aid organizations, in 2000, 31% of Kinshasa's residents were chronically malnourished and only 10% could afford three meals a day. In 2003, the average food intake of the population was 1300 kilocalories per day. The health system was largely destroyed and, reportedly, 500,000 people died of malaria each year, more than a third of them children under five years old.

==== Investigation of illegal mineral exploitation ====
In April 2001, a United Nations panel of experts investigated the illegal exploitation of diamonds, cobalt, coltan, gold, and other lucrative resources in the Congo. The report accused Rwanda, Uganda, and Zimbabwe of systematically exploiting Congolese resources, and recommended that the Security Council impose international sanctions. In October 2002, the UN panel released another report claiming that "three distinct criminal groups" linked to Rwanda, Uganda, and the DRC/Zimbabwe were continuing to plunder the country's natural resources. It stated that "looting that was previously conducted by the armies themselves has been replaced with organised systems of embezzlement, tax fraud, extortion, the use of stock options as kickbacks and diversion of state funds conducted by groups that closely resemble criminal organisations." The report implicated senior officials in the DRC and Zimbabwe, and accused the RPA and UPDF of training rebels and/or leaving troops behind to continue the plundering of the region's mineral resources.

Kabila dismissed Jean-Charles Okoto as president of the state-mining company Société Minière de Bakwanga (MIBA) on 4 November 2002 after he was named in the UN report, though the government denied that the decision was connected. Uganda, Rwanda, and some of the individuals who were named (including Belgian businessman George Arthur Forrest of the Forrest Group) denied the allegations.

==== Hyperinflation in Zimbabwe ====
Zimbabwean involvement in the war had a significant negative impact on the country's economy. As hardware losses multiplied, Western donors—including the International Monetary Fund and the World Bank—placed their aid programmes to Harare under review, denying Mugabe the foreign currency he needed to buy spare parts valued at $600 million for fighting vehicles then employed in the Congo. Between January and June 2000, the Financial Times reported (via a leaked memo from Minister of Finance Herbert Murerwa) that Zimbabwe spent $166 million on its military ventures there. These factors contributed to the country's severe economic instability during the 2000s, culminating in a period of hyperinflation between 2007 and 2009.

=== Environmental impact ===
The war has caused substantial environmental damage. The forests of Congo are a major biodiversity hotspot, housing The Congo Basin which is widely known as the second greatest tropical rain forest in the world and the largest forest in Africa.

==== Animals and bushmeat trade ====
On account of the war the Democratic Republic of Congo saw their elephant population halve in size, their hippo population go from 22,000 to 900 and their great ape population decrease by 77–93% between 1998 and 2015. With up to 3.4 million people being displaced in Congo as a result of the civil war, many moved into Congo's forests, where they hunted bonobos, gorillas, elephants and more as bushmeat for survival and cleared forest land that were significant habitats for these many animals. Many of these individuals were either from the city where the hunting of certain animals was not a taboo or locals who had their tradition slowly broken down because of their need to survive. One such example had been the Bongando people in which a 2009 study by Kyoto University had observed a disintegration of their cultural interdiction of eating bonobos as influenced by the civil war. During the conflict many of the front lines were located within bonobo reserves, further contributing to the decline in their population.

Government instability and the lack of government enforcement allowed new illegal militia mining camps to form, who located themselves deep within Congo's forest. There, bushmeat became the main source of food. On top of that, the mass number of people entering the forests in conjunction with the mines' unsanitary conditions introduced an increased risk of disease for animals such as gorillas. The government instability and the dangers of war also ceased much of the conservation and protection efforts occurring in Congo at the time, enabling the numerous rampant rebel groups present in Congo to openly partake in poaching. Military assistance having been obstructed by surrounding African countries, Congo was pushed into entering numerous lumber leases with German, Chinese and Malaysian corporations to uphold their military activities. The roads emerging to support the new logging efforts opened nearby villages to receive easier means of transportation and access to deeper parts of Congo's wildlife reserves. The result was a significant increase in bushmeat sales in villages near these logging sites.

The potential threat of rebel forces during the war caused many military officers controlling urban trade to leave their post. This created an open access market in the bushmeat and pet trade that was then undertaken by exploitative lower ranked soldiers looking for profit. The result was an observed quintuple increase of protected animal sales in urban markets in north-eastern parts of Congo around Garamba National Park. Meanwhile, in other northern parts of Congo, researchers in other studies have found a 23% increase in protected animal sales with the overall pattern being a significant increase in protected animal sales.

==== Deforestation ====
The war resulted in a loss of 1.3% of Congo's forests, a size comparable to Belgium. The millions of displaced individuals led to large-scale logging and deforestation to create arable land. These activities had an outsized effect due to the edge effect as a result of the forest fragmentation. The Virunga National Park, Africa's oldest national park, became the first endangered UN World Heritage Site. Its flora was cleared during both the first and second Congo wars to make way for the armies of both sides.

== See also ==
- Dongo conflict, 2009 conflict in the Democratic Republic of the Congo
- Living in Emergency: Stories of Doctors Without Borders – documentary film about the work of Médecins Sans Frontières in DR Congo
- Child soldiers in the Democratic Republic of Congo
- Battle of Kisangani (1997)
- Democratic Republic of the Congo–Rwanda conflict (2022–2025)

General:

- List of conflicts in Africa
