= Nationalist and Integrationist Front =

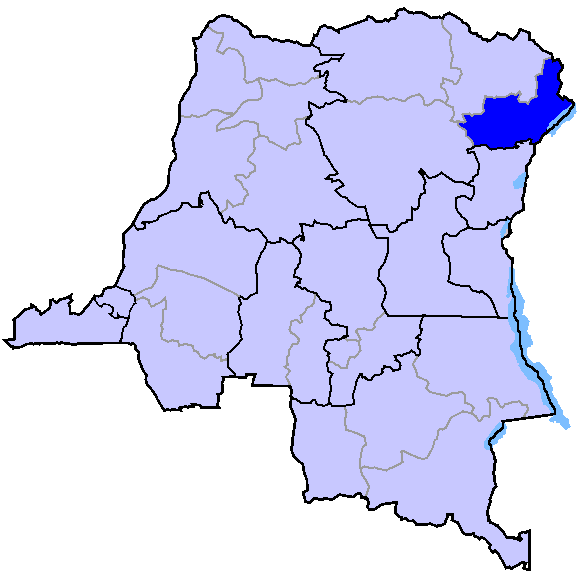
Map of Ituri within the DRC

The Nationalist and Integrationist Front (French: Front des Nationalistes et Intégrationnistes, or FNI) is a rebel group active in the Ituri conflict in Ituri, Democratic Republic of the Congo, associated with the Lendu ethnic group. The FNI has fought against ethnic Hema and is blamed for the ambush and murder of nine United Nations peacekeepers near the town of Kafe in February 2005. FNI political leader Floribert Ndjabu was arrested by Congolese authorities, while military head Etienne Lona turned himself in.

The BBC alleges that, in 2005, the Pakistani peacekeepers in Mongbwalu entered in a trading relationship for gold with FNI leaders, eventually drawing Congolese army officers and Indian traders from Kenya into the deal. It is further alleged that these peacekeepers returned weapons taken from the FNI as part of demobilization efforts to FNI leaders known for human rights violations.

A 2005 Human Rights Watch report details the connection between the FNI and the mining corporation AngloGold Ashanti, a subsidiary of the Anglo American plc. AngloGold Ashanti admitted that its employees had paid money to the FNI on more than one occasion, in exchange for access to gold mines in the Ituri province.

In May 2006, one MONUC peacekeeper was killed and seven were taken captive in fighting with the FNI. All of the UN peacekeepers were from Nepal and engaged in operations to disarm the militias 62 miles (100km) west of Bunia, the capital of Ituri. Two of the seven were released in June and the remaining five in mid-July. On 17 July the new leader of the FNI, Peter Karim Udaga, announced that he and sixty of his fighters were ending their battle with the government in exchange for the integration of FNI forces into the national army, including a post of Colonel for Karim.

The FNI, the Congolese Revolutionary Movement, and the Front for Patriotic Resistance of Ituri (FRPI) agreed to disarm on 22 August 2007. However, in 2008, several residents in Mongbwalu reported witnessing FNI militias being resupplied by Pakistani UN peacekeepers. The transfer of weapons was confirmed by two FNI leaders currently in prison – "Kung Fu" (Gen. Mateso Ninga) and "Dragon".
