= United Nations Security Council Resolution 1711 =

UN Security Council Resolution 1711
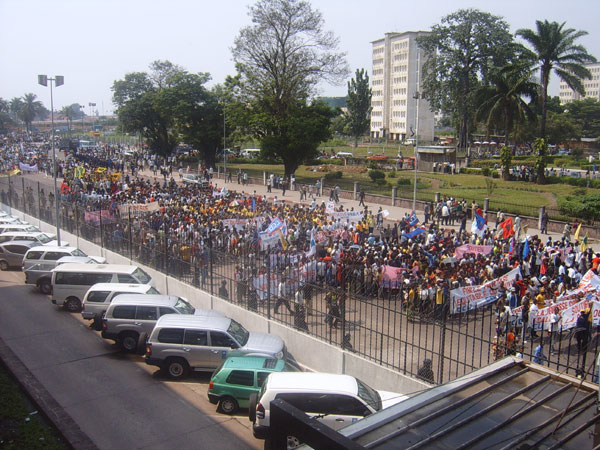
- Demonstrations in support of the 2006 elections in Kinshasa
- Date: 29 September 2006
- Meeting no.: 5,541
- Code: S/RES/1711 (Document)
- Subject: The situation concerning the Democratic Republic of the Congo
- Voting summary: 15 voted for; None voted against; None abstained
- Result: Adopted

Security Council composition
- Permanent members: China; France; Russia; United Kingdom; United States
- Non-permanent members: Argentina; Rep. of the Congo; Denmark; Ghana; Greece; Japan; Peru; Qatar; Slovakia; Tanzania

United Nations Security Council Resolution 1711, adopted unanimously on September 29, 2006, after recalling all previous resolutions concerning the situation in the Democratic Republic of the Congo, including resolutions 1565 (2004), 1592 (2005), 1596 (2005), 1621 (2005), 1628 (2005), 1635 (2005), 1671 (2006) and 1693 (2006), and resolutions 1650 (2005), 1669 (2006), 1692 (2006) on the situation in Burundi and the African Great Lakes region, the Council extended the mandate of the United Nations Mission in the Democratic Republic of Congo (MONUC) until February 15, 2007.

== Resolution ==
=== Observations ===
The preamble of the resolution praised the citizens of the Democratic Republic of the Congo who participated in general elections on July 30, 2006, underlining their importance as a foundation for long term peace and stability in the country. Furthermore, the Council commended MONUC, the United Nations Development Programme, the EUFOR RD Congo and African partners, particularly South Africa, for their roles in the election process. It stressed the role of the Congolese government for ensuring security during the election period.

Meanwhile, the resolution condemned violence from August 20–22, 2006, between security forces loyal to two opposing presidential candidates, as well as continuing hostilities by militias and foreign groups in the east of the country. It deplored violations of human rights and international humanitarian law in the Democratic Republic of the Congo and the need for the crimes to be brought to justice. The illegal flow of weapons into and within the country—in contravention of resolutions 1493 (2003) and 1596 (2005)—was also condemned.

=== Acts ===
The Chapter VII resolution extended the mandate of MONUC until February 15, 2007, at its current strength. The temporary redeployment of one infantry battalion, medical hospital and 50 military observers from the United Nations Operation in Burundi (ONUB) to MONUC was renewed until December 31, 2006. The Secretary-General Kofi Annan was asked to take steps towards the downsizing of the additional strength by February 15, 2007. MONUC's mandate would be reviewed after the completion of the electoral process.

The Council called on the Congolese authorities to ensure free, fair and transparent elections, where security forces had to remain impartial throughout. It reiterated the importance of the cantonment of non-police security forces in the capital Kinshasa. Furthermore, the authorities were urged to refrain from using violence or threat of the use of force in order to prevent elections.

== See also ==
- Kivu conflict
- Ituri conflict
- List of United Nations Security Council Resolutions 1701 to 1800 (2006–2008)
- Second Congo War
