= United Nations Security Council Resolution 1698 =

UN Security Council Resolution 1698
- Flag of the Democratic Republic of the Congo
- Date: 31 July 2006
- Meeting no.: 5,502
- Code: S/RES/1698 (Document)
- Subject: The situation concerning the Democratic Republic of the Congo
- Voting summary: 15 voted for; None voted against; None abstained
- Result: Adopted

Security Council composition
- Permanent members: China; France; Russia; United Kingdom; United States
- Non-permanent members: Argentina; Rep. of the Congo; Denmark; Ghana; Greece; Japan; Peru; Qatar; Slovakia; Tanzania

United Nations Security Council Resolution 1698, adopted unanimously on July 31, 2006, after recalling all previous resolutions concerning the situation in the Democratic Republic of the Congo, including resolutions 1493 (2003), 1533 (2004), 1552 (2004), 1565 (2004), 1592 (2005), 1596 (2005), 1616 (2005), 1649 (2005) and 1654 (2006), the Council renewed sanctions against the country until July 31, 2007.

The resolution was passed after the first general elections in 40 years.

== Resolution ==
=== Observations ===
The Security Council condemned illegal arms trafficking in the Democratic Republic of the Congo and expressed its intention to continue closely monitoring the embargo that imposed in Resolution 1493. Furthermore, the presence of militias and foreign forces in the Ituri, North and South Kivu regions.

=== Acts ===
Under Chapter VII of the United Nations Charter, the Council reiterated demands to comply with resolutions 1493, 1596 and 1649, and extended sanctions and the mandate of the expert group monitoring their implementation until July 31, 2007, in the light of non-compliance.

Meanwhile, the Council declared its intention to take further measures against the financing of armed groups and militias and urged the Congolese government to extend its authority throughout the country. Furthermore, Council members decided to extend the provisions of Resolution 1596 to political and military leaders using children in armed conflict in violation of international law and also against individuals targeting children in times of war.

Finally, all parties were required to co-operate with the expert group and Uganda was urged to fulfill its obligations in Resolution 1596.

== See also ==
- Kivu conflict
- Ituri conflict
- List of United Nations Security Council Resolutions 1601 to 1700 (2005–2006)
- Second Congo War
- United Nations Mission in the Democratic Republic of Congo
