= United Nations Security Council Resolution 1649 =

UN Security Council Resolution 1649
- Congolese territory controlled by armed groups supported by Rwanda and Uganda (2003)
- Date: 21 December 2005
- Meeting no.: 5,340
- Code: S/RES/1649 (Document)
- Subject: The situation concerning the Democratic Republic of the Congo
- Voting summary: 15 voted for; None voted against; None abstained
- Result: Adopted

Security Council composition
- Permanent members: China; France; Russia; United Kingdom; United States
- Non-permanent members: Algeria; Argentina; Benin; Brazil; Denmark; Greece; Japan; Philippines; Romania; Tanzania

United Nations Security Council Resolution 1649, adopted unanimously on 21 December 2005, after recalling all previous resolutions on the situation in the Democratic Republic of the Congo, including resolutions 1533 (2004), 1565 (2004), 1592 (2005), 1596 (2005) and 1616 (2005), 1621 (2005) and 1628 (2005), the council extended and expanded sanctions against the country until 31 July 2006, and demanded that foreign fighters disarm or face sanctions.

== Resolution ==
=== Observations ===
In the preamble of the resolution, the council began by reiterating its concern at the presence of and hostilities involving armed groups in the east of the Democratic Republic of the Congo. It underlined the importance of elections for the long-term stability, peace and national reconciliation of the country. Violations of human rights and international humanitarian law by the armed militia were criticised by the council, calling for the individuals to be brought to justice and welcoming action taken against them by the United Nations Mission in the Democratic Republic of the Congo (MONUC).

The resolution called upon all armed groups in the Great Lakes region of Africa–including the Democratic Forces for the Liberation of Rwanda (FDLR), Palipehutu and Lord's Resistance Army–to immediately lay down their arms and participate in demobilisation programmes.

The text recognised the connections between the illegal exploitation and trade of natural resources, and arms trafficking as one of the factors fuelling conflicts in the African Great Lakes region. It urged the Democratic Republic of the Congo, Burundi, Rwanda and Uganda to better work together to disarm the illegal armed groups.

=== Acts ===
Acting under Chapter VII of the United Nations Charter, the council regretted that the armed groups in eastern Congo were still armed and demanded that they disarm immediately. It decided that measures in Resolution 1596 (2005) relating to the arms embargo and financial and travel sanctions would apply to political and military leaders of foreign armed groups operating in the Democratic Republic of the Congo and leaders receiving support from outside the Democratic Republic of the Congo. The measures would by reviewed by 31 July 2006.

The resolution went on to urge the transitional Congolese government to protect civilians and humanitarian personnel, and reaffirmed that MONUC had a legal basis to disarm the militia and protect civilians using "all necessary means". The Secretary-General Kofi Annan was invited to submit a report concerning the disarmament, repatriation and resettlement of ex-combatants by 15 March 2006.

The text continued to urge the transitional government to undertake reforms of the security sector, for international donors to continue to provide assistance, and for neighbouring countries to assist in the implementation of sanctions against the Democratic Republic of the Congo, particularly those relating to the transfer of weapons and foreign fighters across borders.

== See also ==
- Kivu conflict
- Ituri conflict
- List of United Nations Security Council Resolutions 1601 to 1700 (2005–2006)
- Second Congo War
