= United Nations Security Council Resolution 1693 =

UN Security Council Resolution 1693
- Democratic Republic of the Congo
- Date: 30 June 2006
- Meeting no.: 5,480
- Code: S/RES/1693 (Document)
- Subject: The situation concerning the Democratic Republic of the Congo
- Voting summary: 15 voted for; None voted against; None abstained
- Result: Adopted

Security Council composition
- Permanent members: China; France; Russia; United Kingdom; United States
- Non-permanent members: Argentina; Rep. of the Congo; Denmark; Ghana; Greece; Japan; Peru; Qatar; Slovakia; Tanzania

United Nations Security Council Resolution 1693, adopted unanimously on June 30, 2006, after recalling all previous resolutions concerning the situation in the Democratic Republic of the Congo, including resolutions 1565 (2004), 1592 (2005), 1596 (2005), 1621 (2005), 1628 (2005), 1635 (2005) and 1671 (2006), the Council extended the temporary increase in the size of the United Nations Mission in the Democratic Republic of Congo (MONUC) until September 30, 2006.

== Resolution ==
=== Observations ===
The Security Council emphasised the importance of elections as part of the long term stability and peace in the Democratic Republic of the Congo. It noted that elections had taken place to the National Assembly and paid tribute to donor countries that had assisted in this process.

Meanwhile, there was a need for reform of the security sector and concern at hostilities between militia and foreign groups in the east of the country. The situation as a whole continued to constitute a threat to international peace and security in the region.

=== Acts ===
Acting under Chapter VII of the United Nations Charter, the Council extended the increase in number of military and civilian personnel for three months until the end of September 2006, reiterating the temporary nature of the increase and expressing its will to downsize when its presence would no longer be necessary.

Meanwhile, the resolution reminded the Democratic Republic of the Congo on the importance of free and fair elections and to refrain from incitement to hatred and violence. MONUC was able to assist the Congolese authorities and the European Union's EUSEC mission in the country.

== See also ==
- Kivu conflict
- Ituri conflict
- List of United Nations Security Council Resolutions 1601 to 1700 (2005–2006)
- Second Congo War
