= United Nations Security Council Resolution 1671 =

UN Security Council Resolution 1671
- Date: 25 April 2006
- Meeting no.: 5,421
- Code: S/RES/1671 (Document)
- Subject: The situation concerning the Democratic Republic of the Congo
- Voting summary: 15 voted for; None voted against; None abstained
- Result: Adopted

Security Council composition
- Permanent members: China; France; Russia; United Kingdom; United States
- Non-permanent members: Argentina; Rep. of the Congo; Denmark; Ghana; Greece; Japan; Peru; Qatar; Slovakia; Tanzania

United Nations Security Council Resolution 1671, adopted unanimously on April 25, 2006, after recalling previous resolutions concerning the situation in the Democratic Republic of the Congo, particularly resolutions 1565 (2004), 1592 (2005), 1621 (2005) and 1635 (2005), the Council authorised the deployment of the European Union's EUFOR RD Congo force to assist the United Nations Mission in the Democratic Republic of the Congo (MONUC) during the 2006 general elections.

The first of the 1,450 EUFOR forces began arriving in July 2006.

== Resolution ==
=== Observations ===
In the preamble of the resolution, the Council praised the Democratic Republic of the Congo for the holding of a referendum for a draft constitution that entered into force on February 18, 2006. It stated that to achieve lasting peace and stability, the holding of elections was necessary and the rule of law had to be restored.

The intention of the European Union to deploy a mission to support MONUC was welcomed by Security Council members.

=== Acts ===
Acting under Chapter VII of the United Nations Charter, the Council authorised the deployment of the European Union mission supporting MONUC for a period of four months after the date of the first presidential and parliamentary elections. It would concentrate in the capital Kinshasa (allowing MONUC to focus on the east of the country) and have elements outside the country and would be subject to a mandate extension beyond September 30, 2006, in conjunction with MONUC. The Secretary-General Kofi Annan was to inform the Council on the Congolese authorities timetable for the elections.

EUFOR RD Congo was authorised to take the following measures:

(a) assist MONUC in difficult situations to prevent them from escalating;
(b) protect the population under immediate threat of danger;
(c) contribute to the protection of N'djili Airport in Kinshasa;
(d) ensure the safety and freedom of movement of personnel and facilities of EUFOR RD Congo;
(e) conduct limited operations to extract individuals from danger.

The arms embargo and other sanctions applied in resolutions 1493 (2003) and 1596 (2005) would not apply to the operation. The Congolese government and European Union were urged to conclude a status of forces agreement. Regional states were also asked to provide support, and MONUC was authorised to provide necessary logistical support.

Finally, all Congolese parties were urged to uphold their commitment to a democratic process.

== See also ==
- Kivu conflict
- Ituri conflict
- List of United Nations Security Council Resolutions 1601 to 1700 (2005–2006)
- Second Congo War
