= Sudan Liberal Party (disambiguation) =

The Sudan Liberal Party may refer to:

- Liberal Party (Sudan) founded in 1952 to compete in the 1953 elections
- Liberal Party of Sudan founded in September 2008 through a merger of four parties
- Sudan Liberal Party, founded in 2003 and in 2008 merged with others into the Liberal Party of Sudan
- South Sudan Liberal Party, founded in 2010
