= United Nations Security Council Resolution 1654 =

UN Security Council Resolution 1654
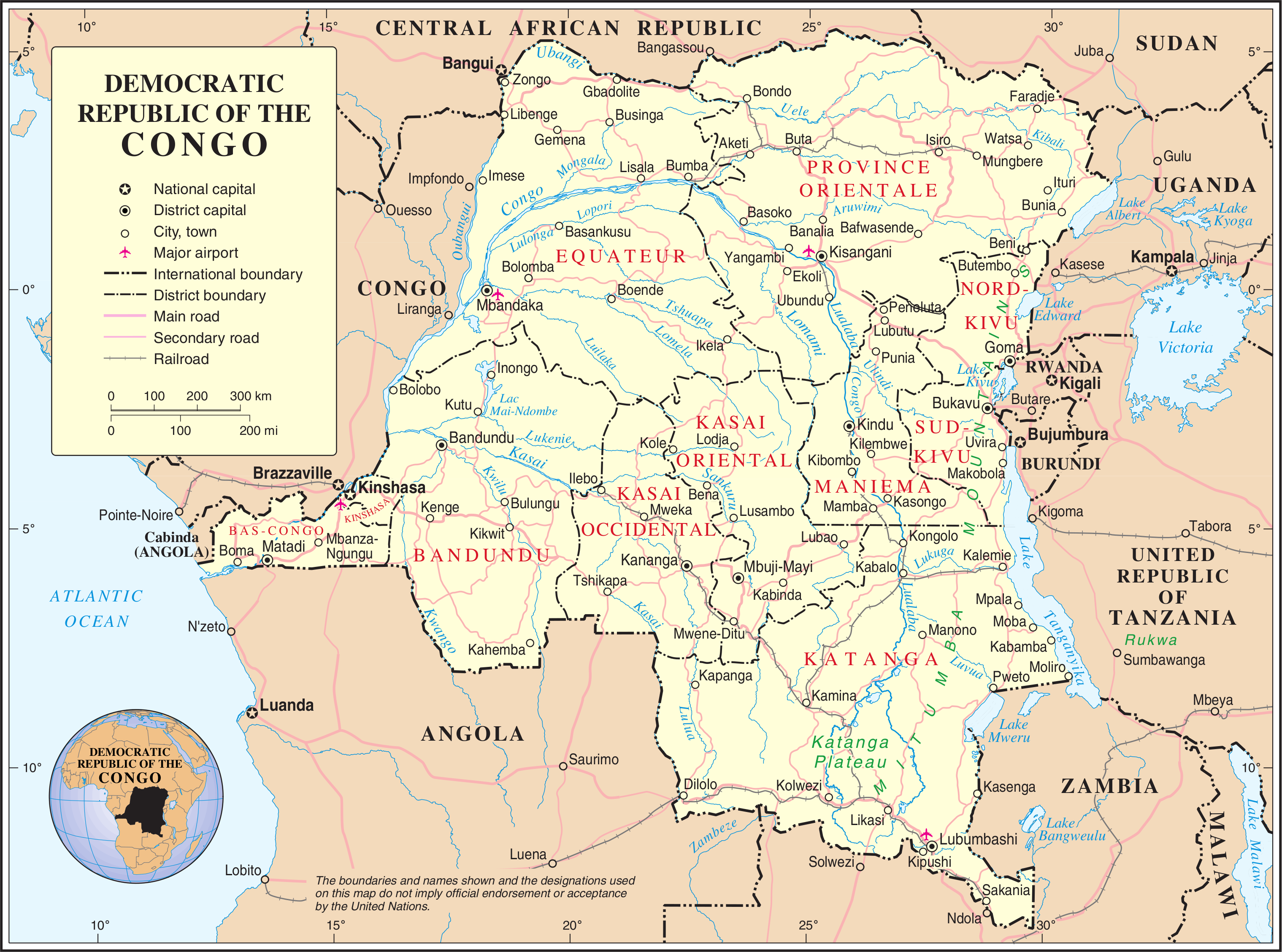
- Democratic Republic of the Congo
- Date: 31 January 2006
- Meeting no.: 5,360
- Code: S/RES/1654 (Document)
- Subject: The situation concerning the Democratic Republic of the Congo
- Voting summary: 15 voted for; None voted against; None abstained
- Result: Adopted

Security Council composition
- Permanent members: China; France; Russia; United Kingdom; United States
- Non-permanent members: Argentina; Rep. of the Congo; Denmark; Ghana; Greece; Japan; Peru; Qatar; Slovakia; Tanzania

United Nations Security Council Resolution 1654, adopted unanimously on January 31, 2006, after recalling previous resolutions concerning the situation in the Democratic Republic of the Congo, including resolutions 1616 (2005) and 1649 (2005), the Council extended the mandate of an expert panel monitoring the arms embargo against the country until July 31, 2006.

== Resolution ==
=== Observations ===
Noting that the situation in the Democratic Republic of the Congo continued to constitute a threat to international peace and security, the Council expressed its determination to monitor and enforce the provisions of Resolution 1493 (2003) which imposed the arms embargo, subsequently expanded by Resolution 1596 (2005).

=== Acts ===
Acting under Chapter VII of the United Nations Charter, the Council requested the Secretary-General Kofi Annan to re-establish the four-member expert panel monitoring the flow of weapons into and within the Democratic Republic of the Congo until July 31, 2006.

The resolution urged the panel to continue to fulfill its mandate and demanded that all states and parties co-operate with the panel, ensuring its safety and unhindered access.

== See also ==
- Kivu conflict
- Ituri conflict
- List of United Nations Security Council Resolutions 1601 to 1700 (2005–2006)
- Second Congo War
