= United Nations Security Council Resolution 1616 =

UN Security Council Resolution 1616
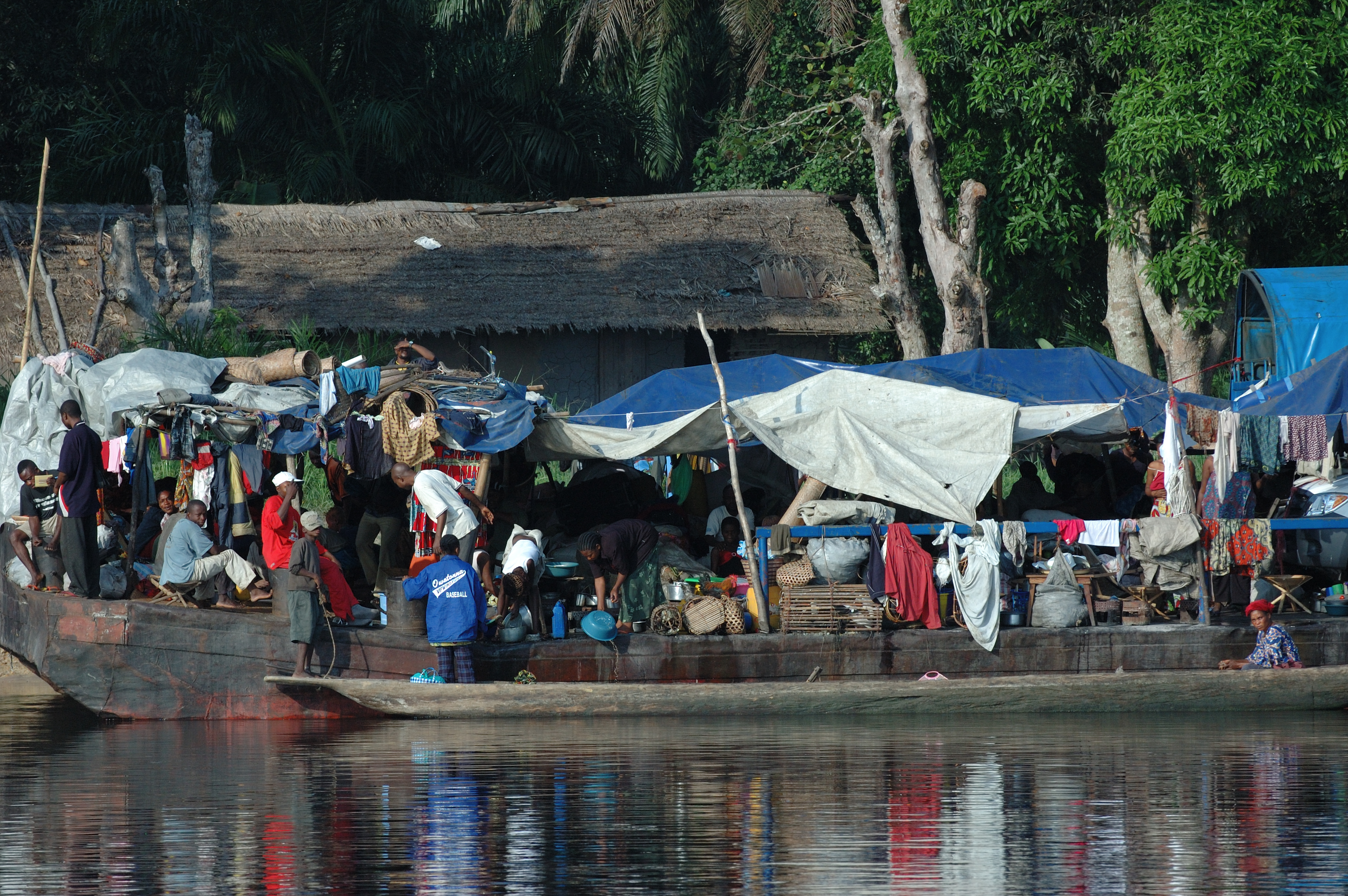
- Congolese refugees
- Date: 29 July 2005
- Meeting no.: 5,243
- Code: S/RES/1616 (Document)
- Subject: The situation concerning the Democratic Republic of the Congo
- Voting summary: 15 voted for; None voted against; None abstained
- Result: Adopted

Security Council composition
- Permanent members: China; France; Russia; United Kingdom; United States
- Non-permanent members: Algeria; Argentina; Benin; Brazil; Denmark; Greece; Japan; Philippines; Romania; Tanzania

United Nations Security Council resolution 1616, adopted unanimously on 29 July 2005, after recalling all previous resolutions on the situation in the Democratic Republic of the Congo, including resolutions 1493 (2003), 1533 (2004), 1552 (2004), 1565 (2004), 1592 (2005) and 1596 (2005), the Council extended sanctions against the country for a further year after relevant parties did not comply with its demands.

== Resolution ==
=== Observations ===
The council began by reiterating its concern at the presence of armed groups in the east of the Democratic Republic of the Congo in addition to the flow of weapons both within and into the country. It recognised the connections between the illegal exploitation and trade of natural resources, and arms trafficking as one of the factors fuelling conflicts in the African Great Lakes region.

=== Acts ===
Acting under Chapter VII of the United Nations Charter, the council noted the failure of the relevant parties in the Democratic Republic of the Congo to comply with the demands of the Security Council, and thus extended sanctions until 31 July 2006; the measures would be reviewed if the parties complied.

The Secretary-General Kofi Annan was asked to re-establish an expert group until 31 January 2006 in order to monitor the implementation of the sanctions, and compliance with Security Council demands.

== See also ==
- Kivu conflict
- Ituri conflict
- List of United Nations Security Council Resolutions 1601 to 1700 (2005–2006)
- Second Congo War
