= United Nations Security Council Resolution 1635 =

UN Security Council Resolution 1635
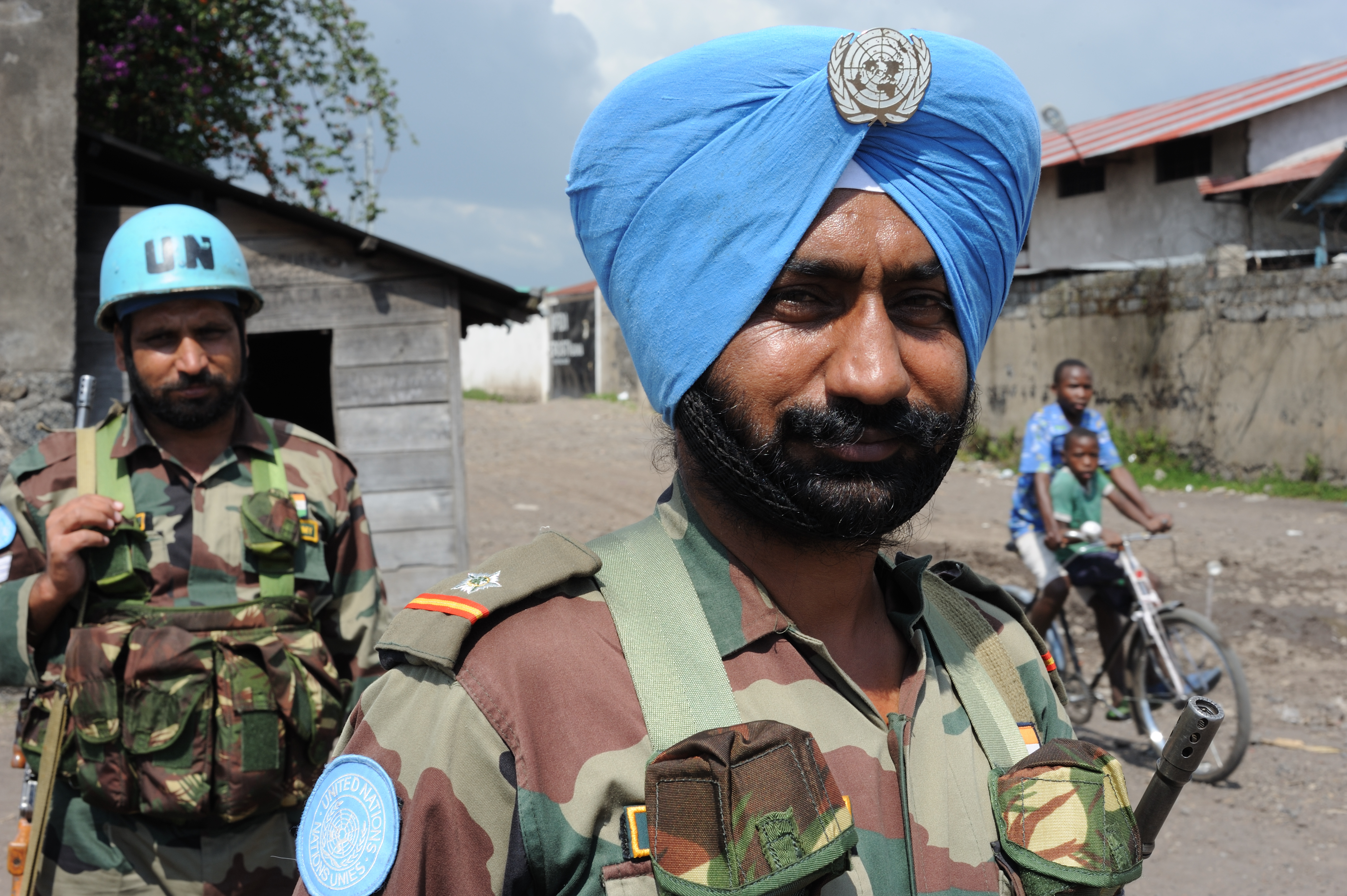
- Indian MONUC peacekeepers
- Date: 28 October 2005
- Meeting no.: 5,296
- Code: S/RES/1635 (Document)
- Subject: The situation concerning the Democratic Republic of the Congo
- Voting summary: 15 voted for; None voted against; None abstained
- Result: Adopted

Security Council composition
- Permanent members: China; France; Russia; United Kingdom; United States
- Non-permanent members: Algeria; Argentina; Benin; Brazil; Denmark; Greece; Japan; Philippines; Romania; Tanzania

United Nations Security Council resolution 1635, adopted unanimously on 28 October 2005, after recalling all previous resolutions on the situation in the Democratic Republic of the Congo, including resolutions 1565 (2004), 1592 (2005), 1596 (2005), 1621 (2005) and 1628 (2005), the Council extended the mandate of the United Nations Mission in the Democratic Republic of Congo (MONUC) until 30 September 2006.

== Resolution ==
=== Observations ===
The preamble of the resolution emphasised the importance of elections in the restoration of peace and stability in the Democratic Republic of the Congo. It welcomed the commitment of Congolese authorities to promote good governance and economic management. There was concern at the continuation of hostilities in the east of the country and violations of human rights and international humanitarian law.

The Council recognised the link between the illegal exploitation of natural resources and arms trafficking as one of the major factors fuelling the conflict in the country.

=== Acts ===
Acting under Chapter VII of the United Nations Charter, the Council extended MONUC's mandate and temporarily increased its strength by 300 personnel until 1 July 2006. Congolese parties were urged to ensure free, fair and transparent elections and carry out a reform of the security sector. Meanwhile, the international community was urged to provide assistance for the reform of the police and armed forces, while MONUC was requested to continue to provide assistance for the political transition process.

Finally, efforts by MONUC to implement the zero-tolerance sexual exploitation policy were welcomed.

== See also ==
- Kivu conflict
- Ituri conflict
- List of United Nations Security Council Resolutions 1601 to 1700 (2005–2006)
- Second Congo War
