= United Nations Security Council Resolution 1807 =

UN Security Council Resolution 1807
- Date: 31 March 2008
- Meeting no.: 5,861
- Code: S/RES/1807 (Document)
- Subject: The situation concerning the Democratic Republic of the Congo
- Voting summary: 15 voted for; None voted against; None abstained
- Result: Adopted

Security Council composition
- Permanent members: China; France; Russia; United Kingdom; United States
- Non-permanent members: Burkina Faso; Belgium; Costa Rica; Croatia; Indonesia; Italy; Libya; Panama; South Africa; Vietnam

United Nations Security Council Resolution 1807 was unanimously adopted on 31 March 2008.

== Resolution ==
The Security Council, condemning the continuing illicit flow of weapons within and into the Democratic Republic of the Congo, this morning decided to extend and adjust the arms embargo and related sanctions regime concerning the country until 31 December.

The regime consists of an arms embargo against armed groups in the country that are not part of the Government’s integrated army or police units, as well as a travel ban and assets freeze on those violating the embargo, as determined in resolutions 1493 (2003), 1596 (2005), 1698 (2006) and 1771 (2007).

Unanimously adopting resolution 1807 (2008) and acting under Chapter VII of the United Nations’ Charter, the Council also extended the mandate of the Group of Experts established pursuant to resolution 1771 (2007) concerning the monitoring of sanctions implementation, as it reiterated its serious concern regarding the presence of armed groups and militia in the eastern part of the Democratic Republic of the Congo, particularly in the provinces of North and South Kivu and the Ituri district.

Terminating a measure whereby authorized shipments of arms and related materiel should only be made to sites designated by the Government, the Council decided that all States shall notify in advance the Committee established pursuant to resolution 1533 (2004) – the sanctions committee – of any shipment of arms and related materiel or provision of assistance for the Democratic Republic of the Congo, stressing the importance of providing all relevant information, such as the end-user, the proposed date of delivery and the itinerary of shipments.

Other measures in the resolution included a requirement for the Government of the Democratic Republic of the Congo and the States bordering Ituri and the Kivus to take the necessary measures to strengthen customs controls along the borders between Ituri or the Kivus and the neighbouring States, as well as travel restrictions on and freezing of assets of persons or entities designated by the Committee.

The Council will review the measures set forth in the resolution when appropriate, but not later than 31 December, in the light of consolidation of the security situation, in particular progress in security sector reform and in the disarming, demobilization, repatriation, resettlement and reintegration processes of Congolese and foreign armed groups.

== See also ==
- List of United Nations Security Council Resolutions 1801 to 1900 (2008–2009)
- 2012 East D. R. Congo conflict
