= Africa Liberal Network =

African liberal organisation

Africa Liberal Network logo

The Africa Liberal Network (ALN; French: Réseau libéral africain) is an organization composed of 42 political parties from 24 countries in Africa. It is an associated organisation of Liberal International, the political family to which liberal democratic parties belong. The ALN serves to promote liberal objectives and principles throughout the continent.

Parties involved in the ALN agree to a policy stating that they: exist to ensure the freedom and dignity of all people through; establishing political and civil rights, ensuring basic freedoms, the rule of law, democratic government based on free and fair elections with peaceful transition, ensuring religious, gender, and minority rights, fighting corruption, and establishing free market economies.

== Development ==
The network developed from what was originally the Organisation of African Liberal Parties and was established during an initial meeting of parties in Mombasa, Kenya, in July 2001. It was formally launched at a subsequent meeting in Johannesburg, South Africa, in June 2003. This meeting adopted the Johannesburg Declaration, committing the parties to core liberal democratic principles. The network is now run from the Democratic Alliance headquarters in Cape Town, South Africa. The Westminster Foundation for Democracy primarily supports the ALN, and since its inception it has maintained a mutually beneficial relationship with other partners. To ensure sustainability the ALN is seeking to diversify and broaden its support and partnership base to include other institutions.

== Objectives ==
The Africa Liberal Network's objectives are:

- Facilitate the development and growth of Liberal Democratic parties.
- Encourage solidarity among member parties with the aim of assisting them to achieve power through democratic means.
- Establish an alliance of like-minded Liberal Democratic parties in Africa for sharing information and experiences.

== Projects and activities ==
The ALN's projects focus on: coordination and leadership meetings; election/campaign support; policy development; party organisation and development; political education, civic awareness, voter education and registration; joint policy positions; training seminars, workshops; gender and youth mainstreaming; information and Skills exchange through visits, website, bulletin, publications, research.

== Members ==
- Organization of African Liberal Youth-Liberals Energizing African Democracy OALY-LEAD

Botswana

- Botswana Movement for Democracy BMD

Burkina Faso

- Alliance for Democracy and Federation-African Democratic Rally ADF-RDA
- Union for Progress and Reform UPC
- Alternative Faso FA

Burundi

- Alliance démocratique pour le renouveau ADR

Comoros

- Alliance Nationale pour les Comores ANC

Democratic Republic of the Congo

- National Alliance of Democrats for Reconstruction ANADER
- Together for the Republic EPR
- Parti national pour la réforme PNR
- Peuple au Service de la Nation PSN

(Republic of the Congo) Republic of Congo

- Union des Démocrates Humanistes UDH-Yuki
- Republican Movement MR

Ethiopia

- Ethiopian Democratic Party EDP

Ghana

- Liberal Party of Ghana LPG
- Progressive People's Party PPP

Guinea

- Union of Democratic Forces of Guinea UFDG
- Union of Republican Forces UFR
- Parti des démocrates pour l'espoir PADES

Ivory Coast

- Rally of Houphouëtists for Democracy and Peace RHDP

Kenya

- Orange Democratic Movement ODM

Madagascar

- Arche de la Nation ADN
- Movement for the Progress of Madagascar MFM

Mali

- Parti citoyen pour le renouveau PCR
- Party for Economic Development and Solidarity PDES
- Union for the Republic and Democracy URD

Mauritania

- Rassemblement pour la Mauritanie RPM-Temam

Morocco

- Popular Movement MP
- Constitutional Union UC

Senegal

- Senegalese Democratic Party PDS
- Alliance for the Republic APR
- Rewmi

Seychelles

- Seychelles National Party SNP

Somalia

- CAHDİ Party

Somaliland

- Kulmiye Peace, Unity, and Development Party Kulmiye

South Africa

- Democratic Alliance DA

Sudan

- Liberal Party of Sudan LPS
- Sudan of the Future SoF

Eswatini

- African United Democratic Party AUDP

Tanzania

- Civic United Front CUF
- Alliance for Change and Transparency ACT–Wazalendo

Zambia

- People's Alliance for Change PAC
- United Party for National Development UPND
