= United Nations Security Council Resolution 1628 =

UN Security Council Resolution 1628
- MONUC medal bar
- Date: 30 September 2005
- Meeting no.: 5,272
- Code: S/RES/1628 (Document)
- Subject: The situation concerning the Democratic Republic of the Congo
- Voting summary: 15 voted for; None voted against; None abstained
- Result: Adopted

Security Council composition
- Permanent members: China; France; Russia; United Kingdom; United States
- Non-permanent members: Algeria; Argentina; Benin; Brazil; Denmark; Greece; Japan; Philippines; Romania; Tanzania

United Nations Security Council resolution 1628, adopted unanimously on 30 September 2005, after recalling all previous resolutions on the situation in the Democratic Republic of the Congo, including resolutions 1565 (2004), 1592 (2005), 1596 (2005) and 1621 (2005), the Council extended the mandate of the United Nations Mission in the Democratic Republic of Congo (MONUC) for a period of one month.

The Council reaffirmed its support for the sovereignty, territorial integrity and independence of the Democratic Republic of the Congo and extended the mandate of MONUC until 31 October 2005. The resolution was essentially technical in nature to allow the Council more time to discuss a one-year extension of the mission proposed by the Secretary-General Kofi Annan.

== See also ==
- Kivu conflict
- Ituri conflict
- List of United Nations Security Council Resolutions 1601 to 1700 (2005–2006)
- Second Congo War
