= Kathi Lynn Austin =

American film director

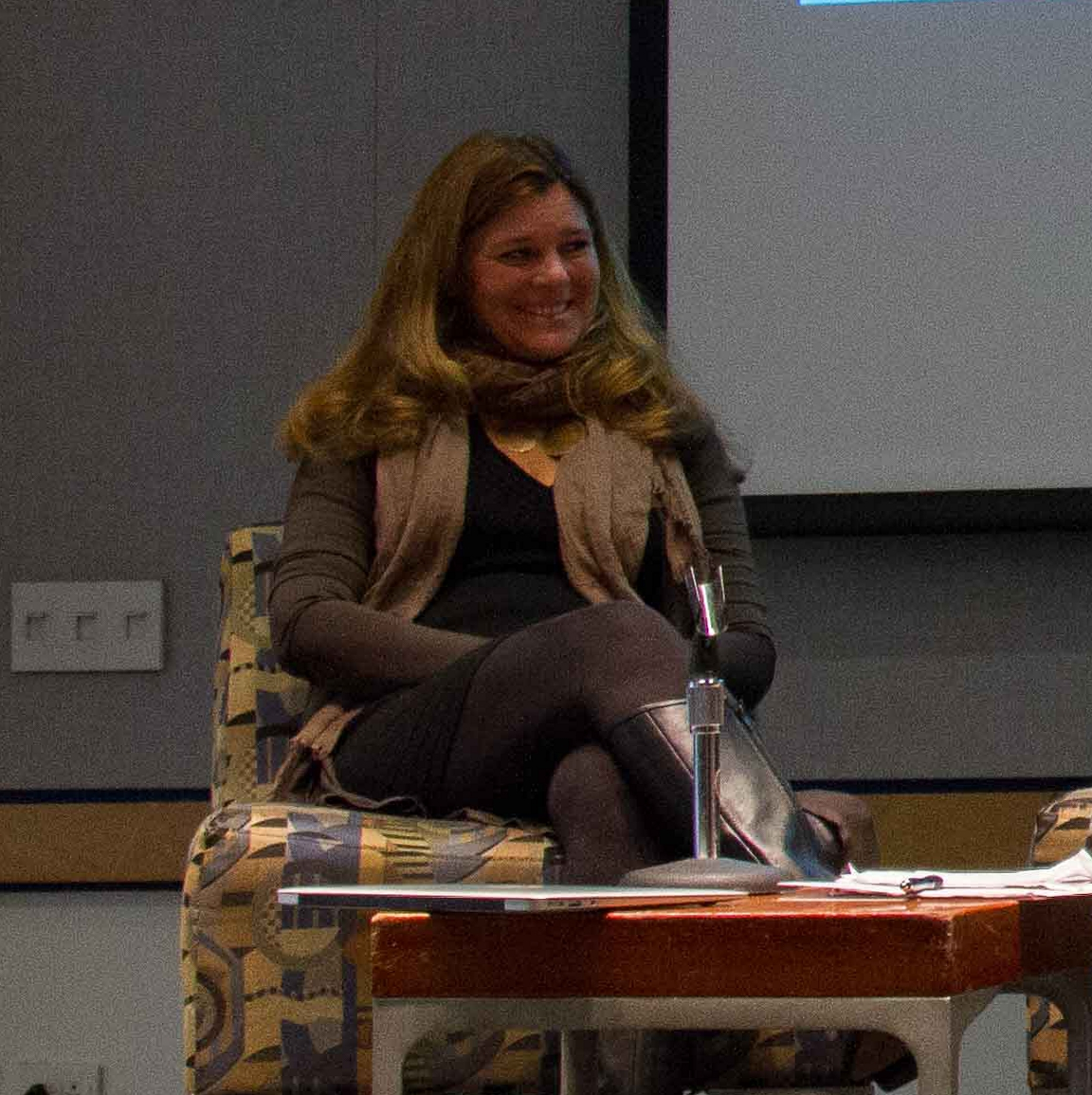
Kathi Lynn Austin

Kathi Lynn Austin (born ca. 1960 in Virginia) is an expert on arms trafficking, peace and security, and human rights. She has investigated the illegal trade in weapons, illicit trafficking operations, illegal resource exploitation and terrorism for over 20 years, and has documented conflicts in Africa, Latin America, East and Central Europe, and South Asia.

She is the founder and Executive Director of the Conflict Awareness Project, an international non-governmental organization investigating and bringing to justice major arms traffickers, war profiteering networks, and transnational criminal organizations that fuel conflict. In 2011, she was named Person of the Year by the Arms Control Association after she garnered the highest number of votes in an on-line poll.

Austin served as a member of the United Nations Group of Experts on the Democratic Republic of Congo (DRC) and Liberia as well as Chief of the Joint Mission Analysis Centre for the United Nations Peacekeeping Missions in Timor-Leste and Burundi.

In 1997, Austin directed Forsaken Cries: The Story of Rwanda for Amnesty International. The short documentary film examined the Rwandan genocide. On November 13, 2000, Austin spoke to the National Press Club about Kenya's illegal arms trade and militias citing evidence she gathered during a three-month investigation. On 21 April 2004, she was appointed by Kofi Annan to a four-member panel charged with monitoring the Democratic Republic of Congo's compliance with Security Council Resolution 1533 (2004), passed on 12 March 2004.

Austin is a visiting scholar at the Center for Human Rights at the University of California, Berkeley, a former director of the Arms & Conflict Program of the Fund for Peace, and a member of the Council on Foreign Relations.

In 2008, Ban Ki-moon wrote in a New York Times op-ed that Austin "has spent much of the past decade tracking illegal weapons smugglers operating in the DRC and other conflict zones across Africa. Partly as a result of her dogged efforts, the alleged leader of one of the world's largest trafficking networks, Viktor Bout, was recently arrested on terrorism charges in Thailand."

== Advocacy Against Rhinoceros Hunting ==
Beginning in 2014, having been contacted by conservation groups, Austin turned to investigating the trade in rhinoceros horns, employing the tactics she had used against weapons traffickers to track the firearms used in poaching rhinos. Her view is that preventing the cross-border shipment in hunting arms is more practical, and more likely to succeed, than encountering poachers in the wild.

== Film ==
In 2007 it was reported that Angelina Jolie would play Austin in a Paramount Pictures movie. Her character's antagonist was said to be based on arms dealer Victor Bout.
