= National Alliance of Democrats for Reconstruction =

Political party in the Democratic Republic of the Congo

Logo of the National Alliance of Democrats for Reconstruction

The National Alliance of Democrats for Reconstruction (French: Alliance Nationale des Démocrates pour la Reconstruction or ANADER) is a political party in Democratic Republic of the Congo. Since the actual electoral strength of the political parties in Congo is not known, the size of the party cannot be determined.

It was established in 1990 by Kumbu Ki-Lutete, a former assistant ambassador to the UN. Ki-Lutete was the president of the party until his death in 2007; he was succeeded by Kumbu Kumbel. In 1997 Laurent Kabila overthrew Mobutu's government (in power since 1965) and issued an executive order placing severe restrictions on the functioning of political parties. ANADER protested and along with other opposition parties demanded that these restrictions be repealed. After prolonged negotiations between the opposing camps, a political arrangement was negotiated and a transitional government and parliament of national unity was established with ANADER as one of the prominent parties. Mr Kumbu Ki-Lutete was appointed as third vice-president of the transition parliament.

The party currently has one member in parliament, and is also a member of both the Africa Liberal Network and Liberal International.
