= Sudan of the Future =

Cross-party political movement in the Republic of Sudan

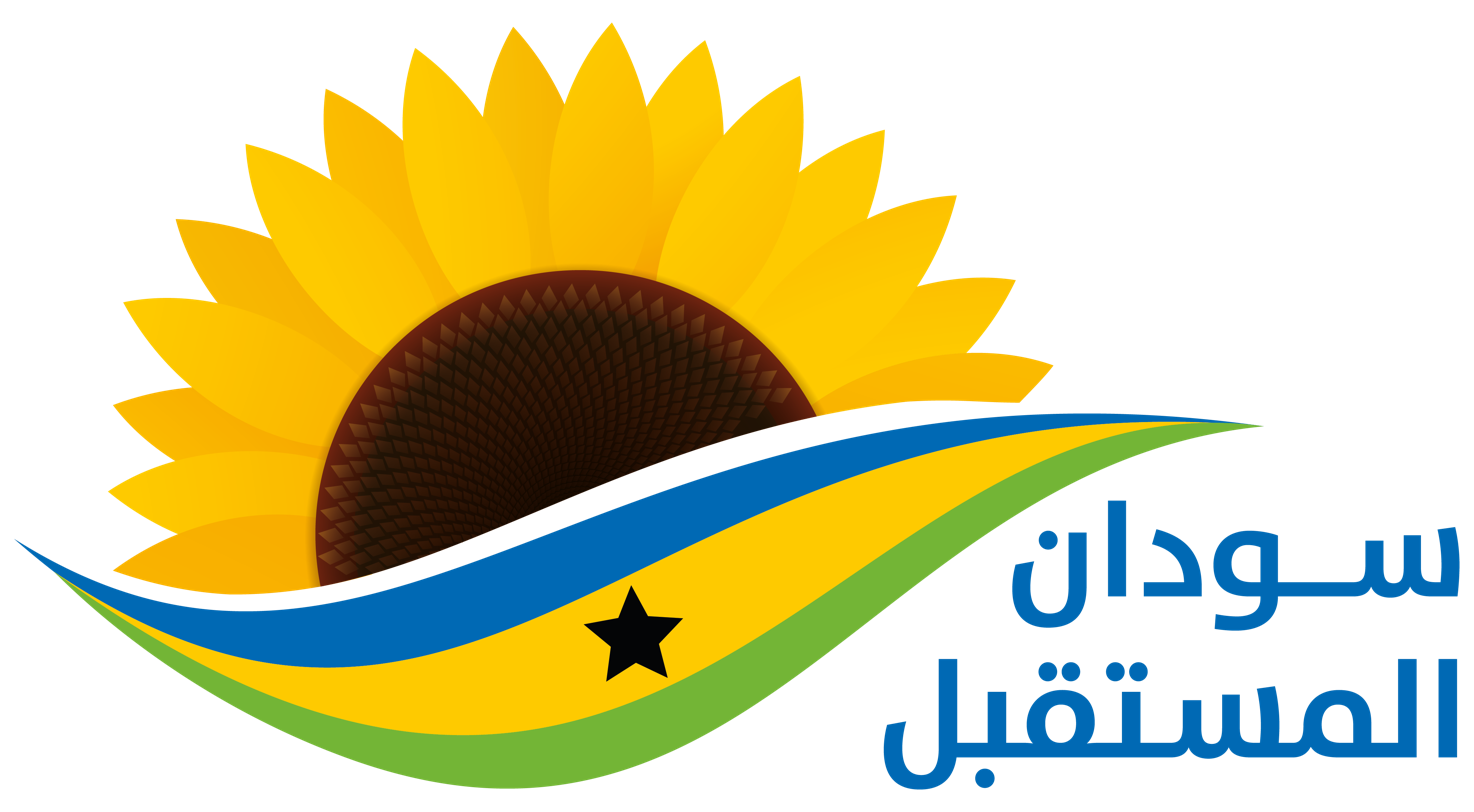
- Founded: 26 January 2017
- Headquarters: Khartoum
- Ideology: Liberalism; Progressivism; Environmentalism
- Political position: Centre

Sudan of the Future is a cross-party political movement in the Republic of Sudan. The movement advocates for public investment, democratic reform, secular state, tolerant society, a green economy and universal basic income.

== History ==
Following the declaration of Adil Abdel Aati to run for the Sudanese Presidential Election in 2020, which was announced with the program entitled "for Sudan of the Future", the movement was established. In the following months, many individuals and political organisations joined the movement, including:

- Liberal Party of Sudan
- Sudan Green Party
- Tawasul (Communication) Party

== Issue-based campaigns ==
In 2017 and 2018 Sudan of the Future conducted wide offline and online consultations with supporters to identify their priorities for the movement. The issues supporters identified as being the most important to campaign on were the youth employment, gender equity and basic income. Sudan of the Future since then designed its program based on this information.

== Leaders ==
Since the foundation, a number of prominent public figures have endorsed the movement so far, with the following individual being listed as the organisation's leaders:

- Adil Abdel Aati
- Rudwan Dawod
- Zakia Sideeg
- Ibrahim Nageeb

== See also ==
- Politics of Sudan
- Adil Abdel Aati
