= Peaceful transition of power =

Concept critical to establishing democratic governments

A peaceful transition or transfer of power is a concept important to democratic governments in which the leadership of a government peacefully hands over control of government to a newly elected leadership. This may be after elections or during the transition from a different kind of political regime, such as the post-communist period after the fall of the Soviet Union.

In scholarship examining democratization and emerging democracies, study of the successful transitions of power is used to understand the transition to constitutional democracy and the relative stability of that government. A 2014 study concluded that 68 countries had never had a peaceful transition of power due to an election since 1788.

== Democratization studies ==
In scholarship examining democratization and emerging democracies, study of the successful transitions of power is used to understand the transition to constitutional democracy and the relative stability of that government (democratic consolidation).

A 2014 study by Adam Przeworski of 3,000 elections from 1788 to 2008, published in the journal Comparative Political Studies concluded that 68 countries (including Russia and China) had never had a peaceful transition of power between parties following an election, making it a "rare and a recent practice." The same study found that once a country has an initial peaceful transfer of power (an "alternation"), it is very likely to keep doing so, making the peaceful transition of power a habit-forming activity. In a stable institutionalized democracy, a peaceful transition is the expected outcome of an election.

Peaceful transitions require a number of strong democratic institutions and norms to exist, such as the willingness of opposition parties to serve as a loyal opposition. Transitions by election put power holders in vulnerable positions, as not only do they risk potential changes in policy and practice and thus their means of power, but they also risk political retribution or retaliation.

== By region ==
The first peaceful transition of power in a country is often treated as an important stage in a government transition towards democracy such as seen in elections in the Democratic Republic of the Congo. Successful transitions during tense political moments such as the Velvet Revolution in Armenia in 2018 are interpreted as signs of improved governance within the country, an important milestone in democratization and functioning civil society. Alternately, the lack of peaceful transfers of power, such as in elections in Georgia from 1995 to 2008 in which the only transition between presidents was via the 2003 Rose Revolution, may harm the international reputation of the country as a "democracy".

=== Africa ===
Since the decolonization of Africa, decolonised countries in Africa had a mixed record in achieving peaceful transitions of power.

The first peaceful transition of power between civilians in Nigeria took place in 2007, although the outgoing and incoming presidents were of the same party and the preceding election was characterized by widespread irregularities. In 2018, Liberia had its first electoral transfer of power since 1944. The first peaceful transition of power in the Democratic Republic of the Congo took place in 2019, with outgoing president Joseph Kabila yielding power to opposition leader Felix Tshisekedi. The first transition of power from one democratically elected leader to another in Niger took place in 2021, following a long history of coups d'etat, followed by another military coup in 2023.

=== Europe ===
==== Georgia ====
The transfer of power resulting from the 2012 Georgian parliamentary election was considered an important case of peaceful transfer of power in the post-Soviet political development of Georgia, which, since the Soviet period, had earlier gone through changes such as the Rose Revolution in 2003.

=== North America ===
==== United States ====
A peaceful transition of power has been the norm in United States presidential transitions. The transition from John Adams to Thomas Jefferson in 1801 was considered an important milestone for the country's fledgling democracy, and was the first time the presidency was handed over to a political opponent. All elections except 2020 have resulted in peaceful transitions of power where the losing party "willingly and peacefully" relinquished power to the opposition. The transition is institutionalized through symbolic acts like the presidential inaugurations. Outgoing U.S. presidents traditionally attend the inaugurations of their successors, a symbol of the peaceful passage of power from one administration to the next. This concept of "loser's consent" plays a vital role in maintaining democratic stability: political parties in the U.S. have come to accept electoral defeat as part of the democratic process, reinforcing the idea that the legitimacy of the electoral system depends on the willingness of political actors to adhere to its outcomes.

In 2020, incumbent Republican President Donald Trump publicly refused to commit to a peaceful transfer of power if he lost his reelection bid. He was defeated in the 2020 election by Joe Biden in both the popular vote and the electoral vote, but refused to accept defeat. Trump falsely claimed election fraud, initiated a seven-part plan to overturn the election, and engaged in an aggressive and unprecedented campaign to remain in power. Trump's fellow Republicans had varied reactions to Trump's false election-fraud claims. Trump's strong grip on the Republican Party led to a majority of the party supporting or refusing to actively oppose him. Among those who stood firm against Trump's attempts to subvert the 2020 election results were Vice President Mike Pence, Georgia Secretary of State Brad Raffensperger, and the courts. On 6 January 2021, a pro-Trump mob, inflamed by Trump's false claims, attacked the Capitol in Washington, D.C., in a failed attempt to keep Trump in power. The mob disrupted the counting of the electoral votes by a joint session of Congress for several hours. Five people died either shortly before, during, or following the attack. The following day, Trump condemned the attack and committed to the peaceful transition of power, but refused to mention Biden's name in his farewell address and did not attend Biden's inauguration. After the power transfer, he has routinely repeated election lies and defended the riots.

Debate continues as to whether the events of the 2020 election represent a temporary aberration or a deeper, more sustained threat to the democratic fabric of the nation. Some argue that the rise of political polarization, the spread of disinformation, and the increasing willingness of political actors to reject established norms could point to a more profound crisis of legitimacy; others believe that the resilience of U.S. institutions in the face of these challenges demonstrates that the foundations of democracy, while tested, remain robust. The aftermath of the 2024 election saw a peaceful transfer of power between Biden and a returning Trump.

=== South America ===
In Venezuela in 1958, the Puntofijo Pact allowed a political agreement to respect the election results, allowing for a peaceful transition of power after the ouster of dictator Marcos Pérez Jiménez and during the country's democratic period.

== See also ==
- Power sharing
- Nonviolent revolution
- Peaceful Revolution
- Succession crisis
