= United Nations Security Council Resolution 1552 =

UN Security Council Resolution 1552
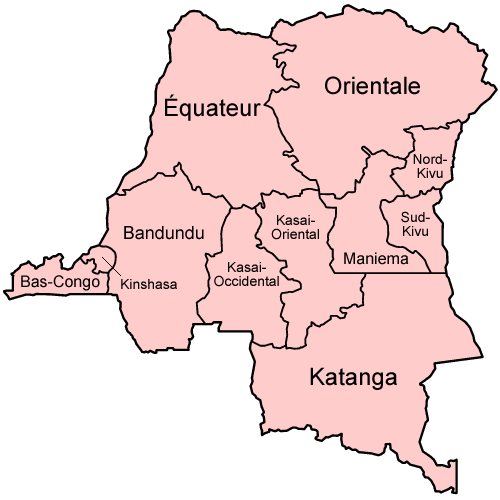
- Provinces of the Democratic Republic of the Congo
- Date: 27 July 2004
- Meeting no.: 5,011
- Code: S/RES/1552 (Document)
- Subject: The situation concerning the Democratic Republic of the Congo
- Voting summary: 15 voted for; None voted against; None abstained
- Result: Adopted

Security Council composition
- Permanent members: China; France; Russia; United Kingdom; United States
- Non-permanent members: Algeria; Angola; Benin; Brazil; Chile; Germany; Pakistan; Philippines; Romania; Spain

United Nations Security Council resolution 1552, adopted unanimously on 27 July 2004, after recalling all previous resolutions on the situation in the Democratic Republic of the Congo, including resolutions 1493 (2003) and 1533 (2004), the council extended the arms embargo against movements and armed groups in the country until 31 July 2005.

The Security Council repeated its concern about the presence of armed groups in the east of the Democratic Republic of the Congo and condemned the illegal flow of weapons within and into the country. It was determined to monitor compliance with the arms embargo, and, noting that relevant parties had not complied with Security Council demands, extended the arms embargo until 31 July 2005. The provisions of the embargo would be altered depending on compliance with the demands of the council, in a review of the measures by 1 October 2004 and periodically thereafter.

The resolution instructed the Secretary-General Kofi Annan to re-establish a group of experts for a period until 31 January 2005, which would be required to report on the implementation of the arms embargo and to make recommendations.

== See also ==
- Kivu conflict
- Ituri conflict
- List of United Nations Security Council Resolutions 1501 to 1600 (2003–2005)
- Second Congo War
