= Liberal Party of Sudan =

Political party in Sudan

Liberal Party الحزب الليبرالي
- Leader: Dr. Ibrahim Nageeb
- Founded: September 4, 2008
- Headquarters: Khartoum
- Ideology: Social liberalism Liberalism; Federalism
- Political position: Centre-left
- International affiliation: Alliance of Democrats
- Regional affiliations: Africa Liberal Network; Arab Liberal Federation
- Colours: Blue, yellow, red and black
- National Assembly: 0 / 426

Website
- liberalpartyofsudan.org

The Liberal Party (Arabic: الحزب الليبرالي) is a social liberal political party in Sudan.

== History ==
The party was formed through the merger of the Sudan Liberal Party, the Sudanese Democratic Movement, the Movement of New Democratic Forces (HAQ) and the United Leadership and the Sudanese Democratic Party on 4 September 2008. It operated under the name United Democratic Liberal Party, till the first convention of the party in September 2010, where its name has changed to Liberal Democratic Party. On 1 August 2016 the party changed its name to the Liberal Party of Sudan.

The first convention of the LP, held on 17–18 September 2010, elected Nour Tawir Kafi Abu Ras, as the leader of the party and president of the executive committee. It also elected members of the LDP Political Council, who, in turn, elected Adil Abdel Aati as chairman of the PC.

In July 2011 Nour Tawir resigned from the party leadership. The political council of the party elected Mayada Swar Aldahab as its new leader. She was re-elected in the Extraordinary Convention of the party on 2 February 2013. In May–June 2014 the LDP has faced serious internal conflict between the political council and the party president. The Conflict ended with the majority of LDP members and leaders organising a general congress on 24 December 2014 and electing a new acting leadership with Nour Tawir Kafi Abu Ras as honorary president and Adil Abdel Aati as acting president. Mayada Swar Aldahab has defected the LDP to form a new party with a defected group of the Democratic Unionist Party (DUP) under the name of the Liberal Democratic Unionist Party (LDUP). On 9 January 2016 the executive committee of the party elected Dr. Ibrahim Nageeb as Acting President.

== List of party leaders ==
- Nour Tawir Kafi Abu Ras ( December 2006 – June 2011)
- Mayada Swar Aldahab (June 2011 – June 2014)
- Adil Abdel Aati (December 2014 – January 2016)
- Ibrahim Nageeb (January 2016 – present)

== Ideology ==
The party's ideology is social liberalism. LP was the first and the only political party in Sudan calling openly for a social market economy. Its predecessor, the SLP published one of the most advanced economic programs in this field, calling for the creation of social market projects in the border areas of Darfur and Eastern Sudan and programs of rebuilding the war-devastated areas based on Social market principles.

== Activities ==
Members of the party from southern Sudan formed their own regional organisation in October 2010, South Sudan Liberal Party, which later changed its name to South Sudan Liberal Youth Forum.

The LP was one of the most active forces in Sudan struggling against Omar al-Bashir's regime, defending human rights and women's rights, calling for justice and comprehensive peace in Southern, Eastern and Western Sudan (Darfur). It was active in the 30 January 2011 Youth uprising in Khartoum and major cities, where five members of its political council were detained for more than a month.

Some LP members established the Human Rights Advocacy Network for Democracy (HAND), a network monitoring human and basic rights violations in Sudan. HAND is active in campaigns to release political prisoners and detainees and is active against civil war crimes in Sudan and against human rights violations within war zones.

LP members are also active in many organisations and foundations working inside Sudan, like the Ali Abdel Latif Centre for Culture and Developmental Studies in Khartoum, the Free Thought Centre in Madani Town in Central region, and the Abiye Organisation for Peace and Development in Southern Kordfan.

== Structure ==
LP has branches and units in ten Sudanese states (out of 16 states). It is relatively strong in West Kurdufan, North Darfur, River Nile State, Al Jazirah State. However, much of the LP membership is concentrated in the Khartoum region, which is the home to one fourth of the country's population.

More than 40% of the LP members are women, which gives it the highest rate of female membership of all of Sudan's political parties, and 74% of members are younger than 35 years old.

== Affiliations ==
The party is a member of the Africa Liberal Network, and it was a member of the Alliance of Democrats until its dissolution in 2012.
