= South Sudan Liberal Party =

Political party in South Sudan

South Sudan Liberal Party حزب الليبرالي جنوب السودان
- President: Simon Achien Majur (interim)
- General Coordinator: Peter Kuot Ngong
- Founded: 1 October 2010
- Headquarters: Juba
- Ideology: Liberalism
- Political position: Centre
- International affiliation: Africa Liberal Network
- Colours: Blue, Yellow, Red

Website
- http://www.sslp.info/

The South Sudan Liberal Party (Juba Arabic: حزب الليبرالي جنوب السودان Hizb Al-Liberali Janub Al-Sudan) is a political party in South Sudan. The party was formed on 1 October 2010. At their first General Assembly meeting on 17 December 2011, the members of SSLP decided that, in light of the limited political space and the strong desire of the youth to become involved in the res publica, the SLLP should transfer its activities to the South Sudan Liberal Youth Forum (Juba Arabic: شباب الليبرالي جنوب السودان Shabab Al-Liberali Janub Al-Sudan) (SSLYF) until 2015.

The party is a member of the Africa Liberal Network and its youth wing is a member of the Organization of African Liberal Youth-Liberals Energizing Africa's Democracy (OALY-LEAD).

== SSLP timeline ==
- 24 October 2017: leader of the SSLP, Peter Mayen Majongdit stated the country should "give enough time for peace to prevail before rushing to the elections" in an attempt postpone the upcoming general elections in 2018.
