= Sudan Liberal Party =

The Sudan Liberal Party (SLP) was a social liberal party in Sudan, founded in September 2003 by young Sudanese activists. In September 2008 it merged with three other liberal and democratic organisations to form the Liberal Party of Sudan.

== Campaigns ==
The Sudan Liberal Party was one of the most active forces in Sudan struggling against the fundamentalist dictatorship, defending human rights and women's rights, calling for justice and comprehensive peace in Southern, Eastern and Western Sudan (Darfur).

SLP established the Human Rights Centre of the Sudan Liberal Party, monitoring human rights violations in Sudan. SLP was active in campaigns to release political prisoners and detainees. SLP also struggled against civil wars in Sudan and human rights violation within war zones.

== Ideology ==
SLP was the first and the only political party in Sudan calling openly for a free market economy. SLP published one of the most advanced economic programs in this field, calling for the creation of free-market zone projects in the border areas of Darfur and Eastern Sudan and programs of rebuilding the war-devastated areas based on free-market principles.

== Structure ==
SLP was led by the General National Congress, which was held every two years. The Congress elected the Central Committee (leading body), the General Control Committee (controlling body), and General Party Court (legal body). The Central Committee elected the executive committee, which was the day-to-day executive body. The Control Committee and Party Court were independent of the executive leadership.

SLP had branches and units in 16 major towns. It was relatively strong in Atbara, Almuglad, Kosti, and Kadugli. However, much of the SLP membership was concentrated in the Khartoum region, which is home to a fifth of the country's population.

== Leadership ==
Nour Tawir Kafi Abu Rass was the President of the party; Tag Al sir Al Atta was the vice-president. Mudathir Khamees was the last General Secretary of the Party while Zahra Hayder was the Secretary-General of the Party. Adil Abdel Aati was a prominent leader of the SLP and one of its best-known members.

== Sources ==
- Sudan Liberal Party Fact Sheet
- Sudan Liberal Party Web Site
