= European Union Military Operation in the Democratic Republic of the Congo (2006) =

EU deployment in 2006 in DR Congo

EUFOR RD Congo logo

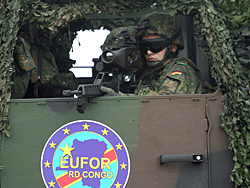
German Troops during EUFOR

The European Union Force in the Democratic Republic of Congo, commonly referred as EUFOR RD Congo, was a European Union deployment in 2006 in the Democratic Republic of the Congo. On 25 April 2006, the United Nations Security Council adopted Resolution 1671 (2006), authorising the temporary deployment of a European Union force to support the United Nations Mission in the Democratic Republic of Congo (MONUC) during the period encompassing the general elections in the DR Congo, which began on 30 July 2006.

The European Council approved the launching of the EU military operation and appointed Lieutenant General Karlheinz Viereck (Germany) Operation Commander and Major General Christian Damay (France) EU Force Commander. The Operation Headquarters was the German Armed Forces Operations Command – Einsatzführungskommando – at Potsdam, Germany.

The mission was tasked with:

- supporting and providing security to MONUC installations and personnel;
- contributing to airport protection in Kinshasa;
- contributing to the protection of civilians under imminent threat of physical violence;
- evacuation operations in case of emergency.

The mission came to an end on 30 November 2006.

== See also ==
- Operation Artemis
- List of military and civilian missions of the European Union
- Transitional Government of the Democratic Republic of the Congo
