= United Nations Security Council Resolution 1621 =

UN Security Council Resolution 1621
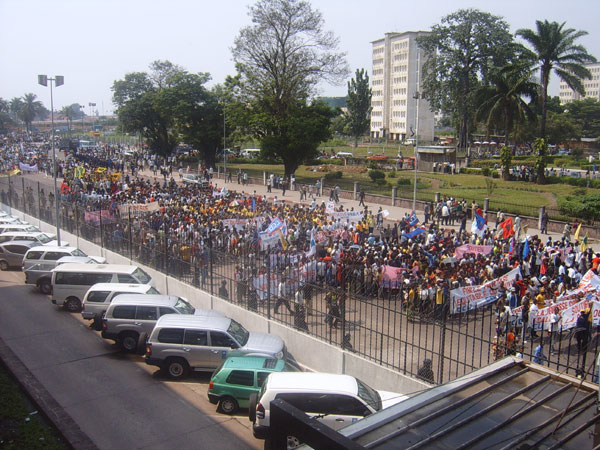
- Protesters in the capital Kinshasa against the delay in holding elections
- Date: 6 September 2005
- Meeting no.: 5,255
- Code: S/RES/1621 (Document)
- Subject: The situation concerning the Democratic Republic of the Congo
- Voting summary: 15 voted for; None voted against; None abstained
- Result: Adopted

Security Council composition
- Permanent members: China; France; Russia; United Kingdom; United States
- Non-permanent members: Algeria; Argentina; Benin; Brazil; Denmark; Greece; Japan; Philippines; Romania; Tanzania

United Nations Security Council resolution 1621, adopted unanimously on 6 September 2005, after recalling all previous resolutions on the situation in the Democratic Republic of the Congo, including resolutions 1565 (2004) and 1592 (2005), the Council authorised the temporary increase in the strength of the United Nations Mission in the Democratic Republic of Congo (MONUC) to assist with upcoming elections.

The additional personnel joined the then-largest United Nations peacekeeping operation, totalling 19,000 personnel.

== Resolution ==
=== Observations ===
The Council reiterated the importance of holding elections in the process of national reconciliation in the Democratic Republic of the Congo, and called upon all transitional institutions to ensure that they were free and fair. It welcomed efforts by the Congolese authorities to promote good governance and economic management, and praised the donor community for their contributions towards this process.

There was also concern at hostilities in the east of the country, including violations of human rights and international humanitarian law.

=== Acts ===
Acting under Chapter VII of the United Nations Charter, the Council approved of the Secretary-General Kofi Annan's recommendations to increase the size of MONUC by 841 personnel, including police units. The resolution emphasised the temporary nature of the increase, with a view to its reduction from 1 July 2006. The additional units would provide support to the electoral commission, as well as assistance to the transitional government and international financial institutions to help promote good governance and economic management.

== See also ==
- Ituri conflict
- Kivu conflict
- List of United Nations Security Council Resolutions 1601 to 1700 (2005–2006)
- Second Congo War
