= United Nations Security Council Resolution 1596 =

UN Security Council Resolution 1596
- 12 – South Kivu; 13 – North Kivu; 14 – Ituri
- Date: 18 April 2005
- Meeting no.: 5,163
- Code: S/RES/1596 (Document)
- Subject: The situation concerning the Democratic Republic of the Congo
- Voting summary: 15 voted for; None voted against; None abstained
- Result: Adopted

Security Council composition
- Permanent members: China; France; Russia; United Kingdom; United States
- Non-permanent members: Algeria; Argentina; Benin; Brazil; Denmark; Greece; Japan; Philippines; Romania; Tanzania

United Nations Security Council resolution 1596, adopted unanimously on 18 April 2005, after recalling all previous resolutions on the situation in the Democratic Republic of the Congo, including resolutions 1493 (2003), 1533 (2004), 1552 (2004), 1565 (2004) and 1592 (2005), the council expanded the arms embargo to include all recipients of weapons in the country, and imposed a travel ban and asset freeze on those violating the embargo.

The resolution was drafted by France.

== Resolution ==
=== Observations ===
In the preamble of the resolution, the security council expressed concern at the presence of armed groups and militia in the east of the Democratic Republic of the Congo, particularly in North and South Kivu and Ituri Province, while at the same time welcoming that some of the groups had begun submitting an inventory of weapons and materiel in their possession. It expressed readiness to review provisions within resolutions 918 (1994), 997 (1995) and 1011 (1995). The council also condemned the flow of weapons into and within the country.

Meanwhile, the council recalled the need for the transitional government to implement the integration of the armed forces. It welcomed political efforts to bring about peace and stability in the Democratic Republic of the Congo by the secretary-general, African Union and others.

=== Acts ===
Acting under Chapter VII of the United Nations Charter, the council expanded the arms embargo against armed groups and militias to all recipients of weapons in the Democratic Republic of the Congo, except the military and police that have completed integration, and non-lethal equipment destined for humanitarian or protective use. The United Nations Mission in the Democratic Republic of Congo (MONUC) was requested to continue monitoring operations in North and South Kivu and Ituri provinces. Parties in those regions were urged to adhere to the disarmament, demobilisation and reintegration of foreign and Congolese ex-combatants.

Meanwhile, Burundi, Rwanda, Uganda and other states in the African Great Lakes region were called upon to monitor air traffic and prevent aircraft flying in contravention to the Chicago Convention, with the Congolese government monitoring airfields in the provinces of North Kivu, South Kivu and Ituri. Countries bordering the three provinces were asked to increase border controls.

The resolution also emphasised that individuals identified by a committee to be acting in violation of the sanctions were to have their assets frozen and a travel ban imposed upon them. States in the region had to report within 45 days on measures they had taken to implement the security council's demands. Finally, the Secretary-General Kofi Annan was requested to re-establish an expert group to monitor the implementation of the sanctions for a period until 31 July 2005.

== See also ==
- Kivu conflict
- Ituri conflict
- List of United Nations Security Council Resolutions 1501 to 1600 (2003–2005)
- Second Congo War
