= United Nations Security Council Resolution 1533 =

UN Security Council Resolution 1533
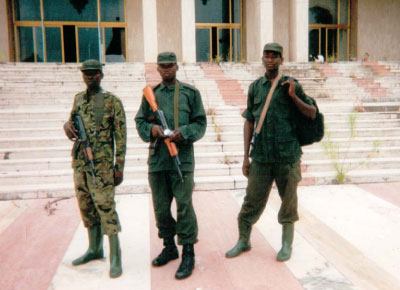
- Congolese rebels in Gbadolite
- Date: 12 March 2004
- Meeting no.: 4,926
- Code: S/RES/1533 (Document)
- Subject: The situation concerning the Democratic Republic of the Congo
- Voting summary: 15 voted for; None voted against; None abstained
- Result: Adopted

Security Council composition
- Permanent members: China; France; Russia; United Kingdom; United States
- Non-permanent members: Algeria; Angola; Benin; Brazil; Chile; Germany; Pakistan; Philippines; Romania; Spain

United Nations Security Council resolution 1533, adopted unanimously on 12 March 2004, after recalling all previous resolutions on the situation in the Democratic Republic of the Congo, the council established a committee to monitor an arms embargo imposed on all foreign and Congolese forces in the east of the country.

== Resolution ==
=== Observations ===
In the preamble of the resolution, the council expressed concern at the presence of armed groups and militia in North and South Kivu and Ituri in eastern Democratic Republic of the Congo. It subsequently condemned the illegal flow of weapons into the country and was determined to monitor the arms embargo imposed under Resolution 1493 (2003).

Furthermore, the right of the Congolese people to control their natural resources and the links between the exploitation of the natural resources and arms trafficking.

=== Acts ===
Acting under Chapter VII of the United Nations Charter, the council demanded that all states refrain from providing weapons and materiel to armed groups operating in eastern Democratic Republic of the Congo. The United Nations Mission in the Democratic Republic of the Congo (MONUC) was requested to continue inspecting cargo and to seize any items in violation of the arms embargo. It further demanded that all parties allow unimpeded access to MONUC personnel and condemned the continuing exploitation of natural resources that was fuelling the conflict in the region. Nearby states were urged to ensure that no direct military or financial assistance was given to the movements and armed groups in the country.

The resolution established a committee to report its observations and recommendations concerning the arms embargo and ways to improve its effectiveness. All countries were to report within 60 days on action they had taken to implement the embargo from Resolution 1493. Meanwhile, the Secretary-General Kofi Annan was asked to appoint a group of up to four experts, one of whom was noted trafficking expert Kathi Lynn Austin, to gather and analyse information and suggest ways for states to improve their capabilities to implement the arms embargo, for a period until 28 July 2004, maintaining close co-operation with the committee.

The Special Representative of the Secretary-General was asked to inform of any instances of weapons being supplied to the armed groups and presence of foreign forces in the Democratic Republic of the Congo. Finally, the international community was called upon to co-operate with the committee, group of experts and MONUC, and to provide the Congolese government with assistance in order for it to control its borders and airspace.

== See also ==
- Kivu conflict
- Ituri conflict
- List of United Nations Security Council Resolutions 1501 to 1600 (2003–2005)
- Second Congo War
- United Nations Security Council Resolution 1807
