= United Nations Security Council Resolution 1592 =

UN Security Council Resolution 1592
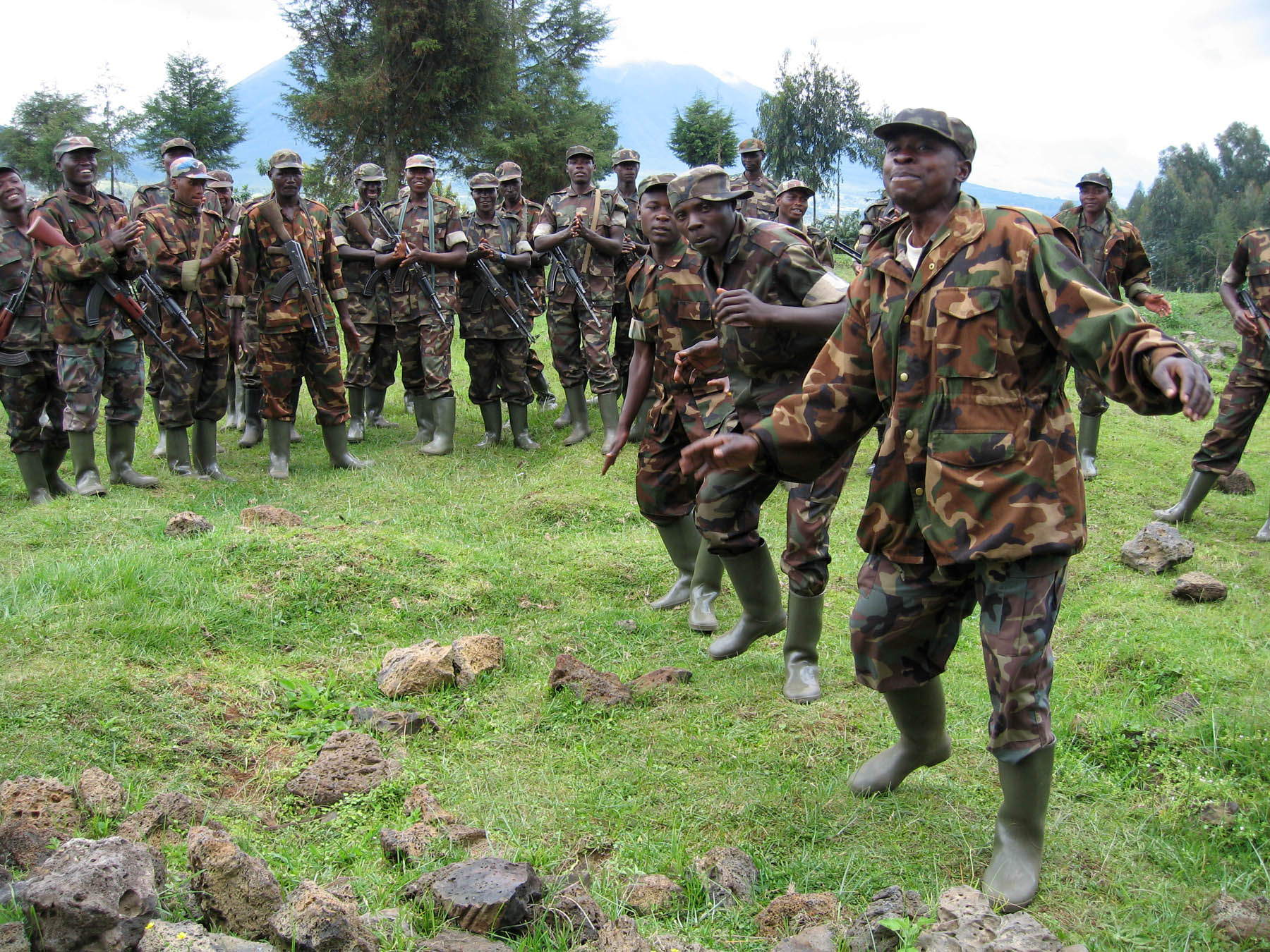
- Rwandan soldiers near the border with the Democratic Republic of the Congo and Uganda
- Date: 30 March 2005
- Meeting no.: 5,155
- Code: S/RES/1592 (Document)
- Subject: The situation concerning the Democratic Republic of the Congo
- Voting summary: 15 voted for; None voted against; None abstained
- Result: Adopted

Security Council composition
- Permanent members: China; France; Russia; United Kingdom; United States
- Non-permanent members: Algeria; Argentina; Benin; Brazil; Denmark; Greece; Japan; Philippines; Romania; Tanzania

United Nations Security Council Resolution 1592, adopted unanimously on 30 March 2005, after recalling all previous resolutions on the situation in the Democratic Republic of the Congo, including Resolution 1565 (2004), the Council extended the mandate of the United Nations Mission in the Democratic Republic of Congo (MONUC) until 1 October 2005.

== Resolution ==
=== Observations ===
The preamble of the resolution reflected the council's concern at ongoing hostilities in the east of the Democratic Republic of the Congo and widespread violations of human rights and international humanitarian law. It reaffirmed that all parties involved in the conflict were responsible for the safety of civilians in the region. The transitional government was urged to bring the perpetrators to justice.

The council noted that the presence of former Rwandan troops and Interahamwe in Congolese territory remained a threat to the local population and on relations between the Democratic Republic of the Congo and Rwanda. It recalled its condemnation of an attack by militia on MONUC forces in February 2005 and welcomed steps to bring the perpetrators to justice. Furthermore, the resolution condemned the illegal exploitation of natural resources in the country, which was fuelling the conflict.

=== Acts ===
Acting under Chapter VII of the United Nations Charter, the council extended MONUC's mandate with the intention of renewing it for further periods. All parties were urged to co-operate with MONUC by allowing it unhindered access and guaranteeing the safety of its personnel. The transitional government was called upon to protect civilians and humanitarian personnel by extending its authority throughout the country, particularly in North and South Kivu and Ituri Province. Furthermore, it had to reform the security sector and make progress towards the holding of elections.

Meanwhile, the resolution demanded that the governments of Rwanda, Uganda and the Democratic Republic of the Congo put a stop to the use of their respective territories in support of violations of the arms embargo imposed by Resolution 1493 (2003), and for neighbouring states to hinder support for illegal exploitation of Congolese natural resources. It emphasised that MONUC could use necessary measures, including 'cordon-and-search' powers against armed groups thought to be threatening the population.

The security council expressed concern about acts of sexual exploitation and abuse carried out by United Nations personnel against the local population and called on the Secretary-General Kofi Annan and troop-contributing countries to urgently address the issue.

== See also ==
- Kivu conflict
- Ituri conflict
- List of United Nations Security Council Resolutions 1501 to 1600 (2003–2005)
- Second Congo War
