= Elections in the Democratic Republic of the Congo =

Direct elections in the Democratic Republic of the Congo occur for the Presidency, National Assembly (lower house of the legislature), and provincial assemblies. The Senate (the upper house), and provincial governors are elected indirectly by members of the provincial assemblies.

Electoral law also provides for the direct election of local councils—commune, sector, and chiefdom—as well as indirect elections for city mayors, city councils, commune burgomasters, and sector chiefs. None of these were held in the first three election cycles under the current system. In the current cycle, as of April 2024, only the election of a limited number of commune councils has occurred.

These elections are run by the Independent National Electoral Commission, often referred to by its French acronym CENI. New elections should be run every five years.

== Electoral framework ==
Elections are governed by Electoral Law No. 06/006 of 9 March 2006 as revised by laws in 2011, 2015, 2017, and 2022. These laws organize presidential, legislative, provincial, city, commune and local elections.

=== Direct voting system ===
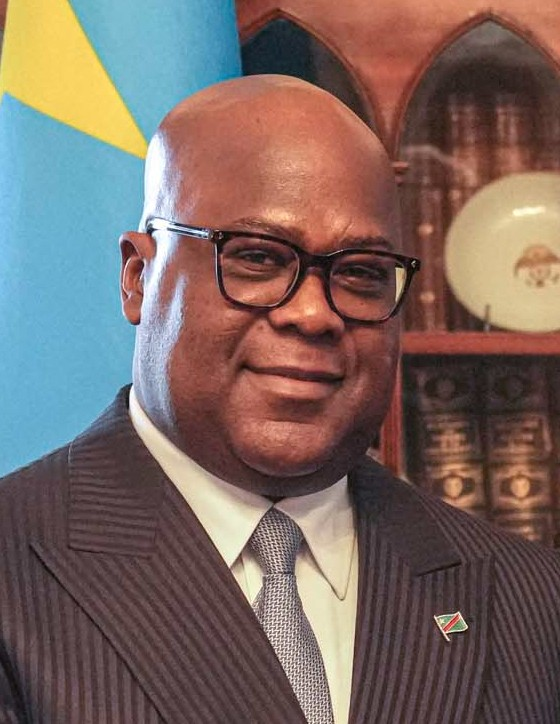
Félix Tshisekedi has been the president since January 2019

==== President ====
Since the 2011 law, the president of the republic is elected by a first-past-the-post, single-round system for a five-year term, renewable only once. The vote is held ninety days before the expiration of the incumbent president's term. The 2006 electoral law previously used a two-round system.

==== National deputies ====
The electoral law sets the number of seats of the National Assembly to 500 and establishes territories, provincial cities and four groupings of Kinshasa communes as the electoral districts. Before each election cycle the 500 seats are allocated to the districts using a procedure that uses that cycle's voter registration numbers. First allocating seats proportionally to the provinces and then allocating each province's seats proportionally to its districts.

The 500 national deputies are elected for five years, renewable, using first-past-the-post in single-member districts and open list proportional representation in multi-member districts. Each deputy is on a ticket along with two substitutes. The number of single versus multi-member districts has varied slightly from election to election mostly because of changes to relative voter registration numbers. In the 2018 election there were 62 single member districts and 438 multi-member districts.

The lists are called "open": a voter choosing a party list may cast a preferential vote for a single candidate to raise that candidate's position on the list; the allocation of seats won by the list is then carried out using the "largest remainder" method. At the beginning of December 2017, the government drafted a bill to introduce an electoral threshold of 3%; faced with protests from a large part of the opposition and the political class, this threshold was reduced to 1%. The fee required to submit a candidacy was also increased to about €450, while a decreasing scale was introduced for lists presenting multiple candidates; the goal in both cases being to limit the fragmentation of political parties. On 15 December, the assembly approved this change to the electoral law, but in accordance with Article 118 of this electoral law, candidates obtaining more than half of the votes cast in their constituency are called "exceptionally elected" and automatically obtain a seat, even if their party (or group) does not reach the 1% electoral threshold, without increasing the total number of seats in the constituency. In 2018, ten candidates obtained seats in this way.

==== Provincial deputies ====
Provincial assemblies are the unicameral legislatures of the capital Kinshasa and the 25 provinces. The electoral law sets the overall number of these assembly members at 780 and establishes territories, provincial cities and the Kinshasa communes as the electoral districts.

Before each election cycle the 780 seats are allocated to the assemblies using a procedure that uses that cycle's voter registration numbers with each assembly getting from 18 to 48 deputies. For each assembly a number of seats closest to, but without exceeding, 10% of the seats are reserved for the co-option of traditional leaders as deputies. Thus, each assembly will have one to four unelected members. In 2018 there were 715 elected provincial deputies and 65 (9%) co-opted deputies. Those seats for elected members are proportionately allocated to the province's electoral districts according to their voter registration numbers. The voting system for these provincial deputies is the same as for national deputies.

==== Commune, sector, and chiefdom councillors ====
In 2018 the CENI planned on running council elections in 311 communes, as well as 734 sectors and chiefdoms. Councillors are elected for renewable five-year terms. The voting system is the same as for national deputies. The number of seats in a commune council depends on the voter registration numbers of the commune, as follows:

- 7 seats for a commune with up to 80,000 voters;
- 9 seats for a commune with 80,001 to 160,000 voters;
- 11 seats for a commune with 160,001 to 240,000 voters;
- 13 seats for a commune with 240,001 to 320,000 voters;
- 15 seats for a commune with 320,001 voters or more.

For sectors and chiefdoms, the distribution is as follows:

- 7 seats for a sector or chiefdom with up to 35,000 voters;
- 9 seats for a sector or chiefdom with 35,001 to 70,000 voters;
- 11 seats for a sector or chiefdom with 70,001 to 105,000 voters;
- 13 seats for a sector or chiefdom with 105,001 voters or more.

None of these elections occurred in 2018.

=== Indirect voting ===
==== Senators and governors ====
The Senate consists of 108 members, with four senators per province and eight senators for the city of Kinshasa. They are elected for renewable five-year terms by provincial deputies through proportional representation with open lists and a single preferential vote. Seats are allocated using the "largest remainder" method. Each senator is elected along with two substitutes.

The provincial governor and vice-governor are elected by a two-round majority vote for a five-year term, renewable only once, by provincial deputies (from within or outside the Provincial Assembly). They are officially appointed by order of the president of the republic. The governor and vice-governor are elected on the same ticket.

==== City councillors ====
Each commune is represented by four city councillors. They are elected by municipal councillors through proportional representation with open lists and a single preferential vote, using the "largest remainder" method, for renewable five-year terms.

==== Mayors, burgomasters, and sector chiefs ====
According to electoral law, Mayors, burgomasters (commune heads), and sector chiefs, along with their deputies, should be elected on the same ticket by a two-round majority vote, respectively by city, municipal, and sector councillors. Their term is five years and is renewable. As of June 2026 no such elections have been held and these officials continue to be appointed. Note: Chiefdom chiefs are not supposed to be elected but are traditional leaders selected by custom.

== Electoral history ==
=== Early efforts at political organization ===
The emergence of political parties in the Belgian Congo (now the Democratic Republic of the Congo) occurred relatively late, beginning in 1957, less than three years before independence. Prior to this period, most organized groups were sociocultural or ethnic associations, or networks formed by former students of missionary schools. These organizations generally showed little interest in political matters, particularly in seeking or exercising political authority. However, during the 1957 municipal elections, some of these associations evolved into political platforms supporting emerging leaders.

The first municipal elections organized by the Belgian colonial administration were held in 1957, primarily in major cities to establish local governance structures led by indigenous mayors and municipal councillors. In Léopoldville (now Kinshasa), these elections were widely boycotted, and ABAKO, favored by the colonial authorities, secured a decisive victory by winning 8 of the 10 municipalities and 120 of the 170 council seats. These elections were marked by a strong reliance on ethnic affiliation in candidate nominations and selection, which entrenched political mobilization along ethnic and regional lines. As a result, parties such as the National Unity Party (Parti de l'unité nationale; PUNA) drew most of their support from Équateur, the African Mutual Party (Parti Solidaire Africain; PSA) from Kwango, ABAKO from Bas-Congo, Centre du Regroupement Africain (CEREA) from Kivu, and BALUBAKAT from Katanga. This pattern was primarily shaped by the delayed rise of nationalism, the vast territorial expanse that hindered nationwide party organization, and the restrictive colonial regime, which tolerated only social and cultural associations while repressing genuine political and nationalist movements.

=== The 1960 electoral process ===
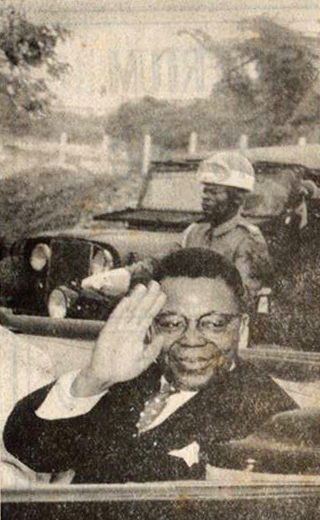
Joseph Kasa-Vubu in 1960

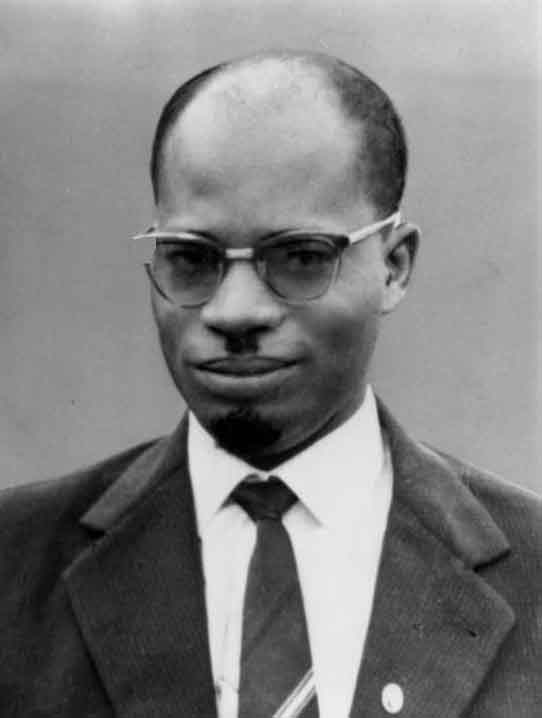
Albert Kalonji in 1960

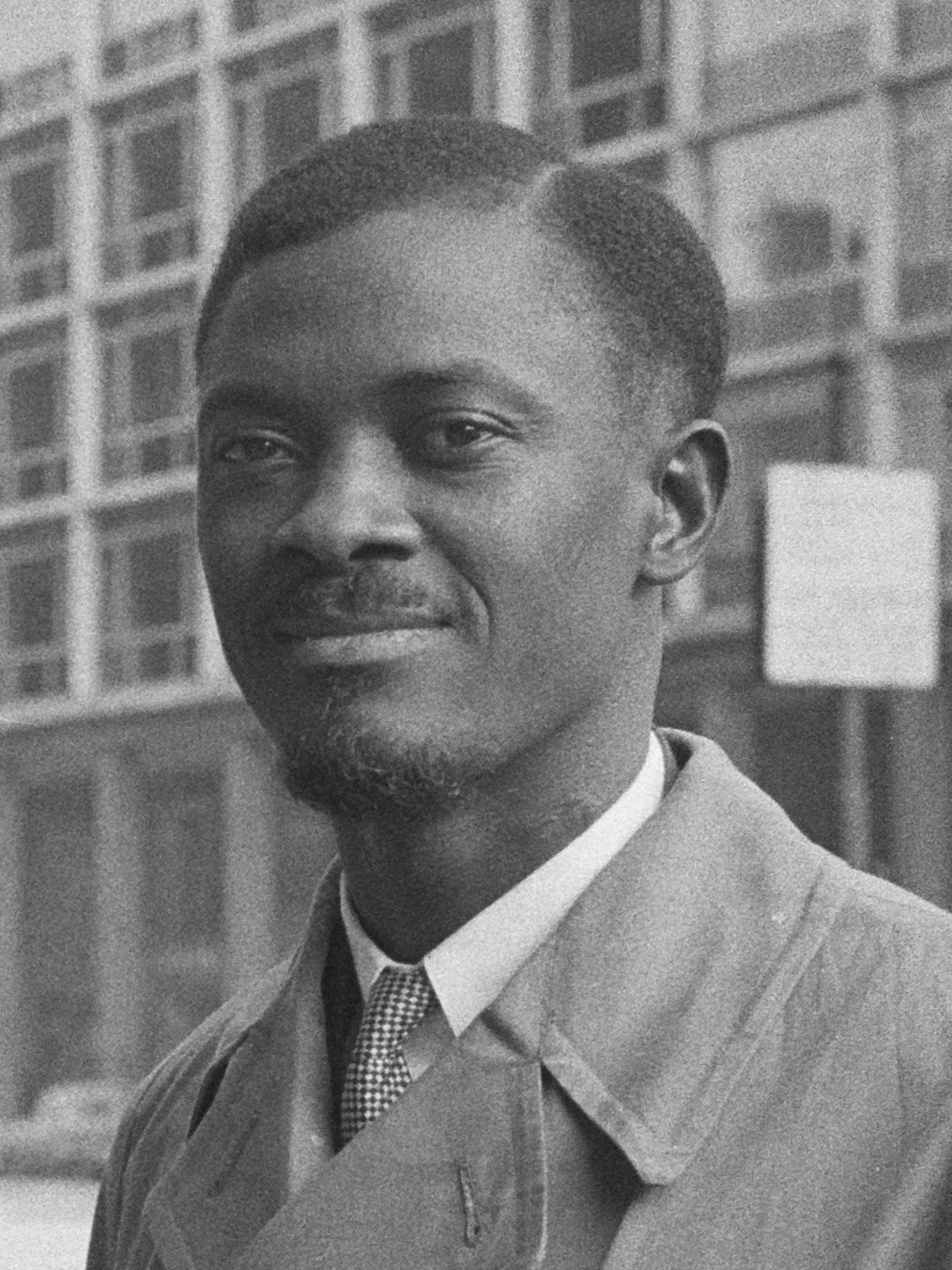
Patrice Lumumba in 1960

During the Belgo-Congolese Round Table Conference held in Brussels in January and February 1960, Congolese political leaders agreed on the organization of municipal elections in March and national elections in May of the same year. However, in their determination to secure independence for the Belgian Congo, political actors allowed little time for adequate preparation, which resulted in elections conducted under difficult material and psychological conditions. The Fundamental Law laid out the institutional framework of the newly independent state, establishing a bicameral parliament composed of a Chamber of Representatives with 117 members elected by universal suffrage and a senate of 87 members chosen by provincial assemblies at a rate of 14 per province. The president of the republic was to be elected indirectly by the senate. At the provincial level, elected assemblies and provincial governments were also planned.

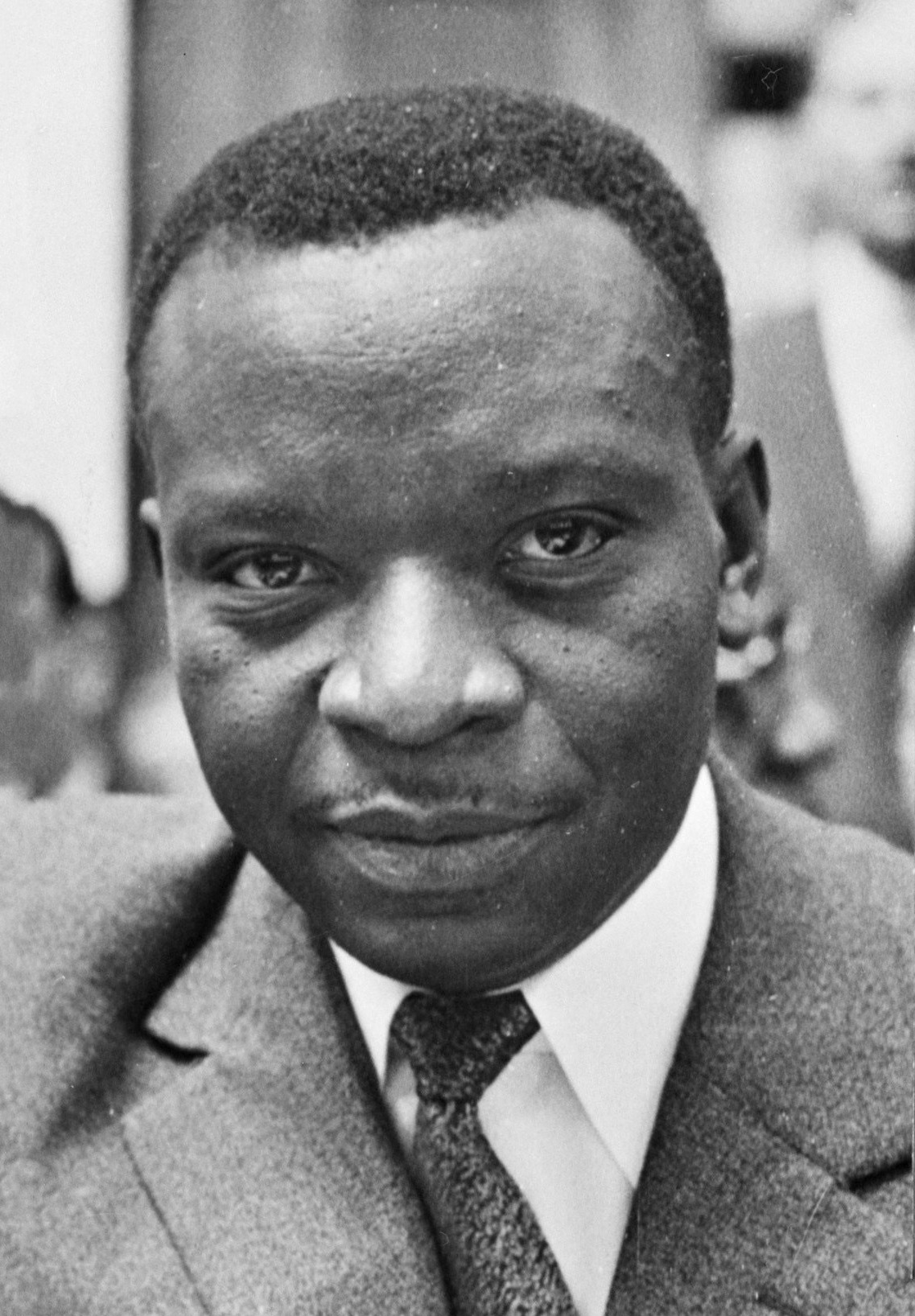
Cyrille Adoula

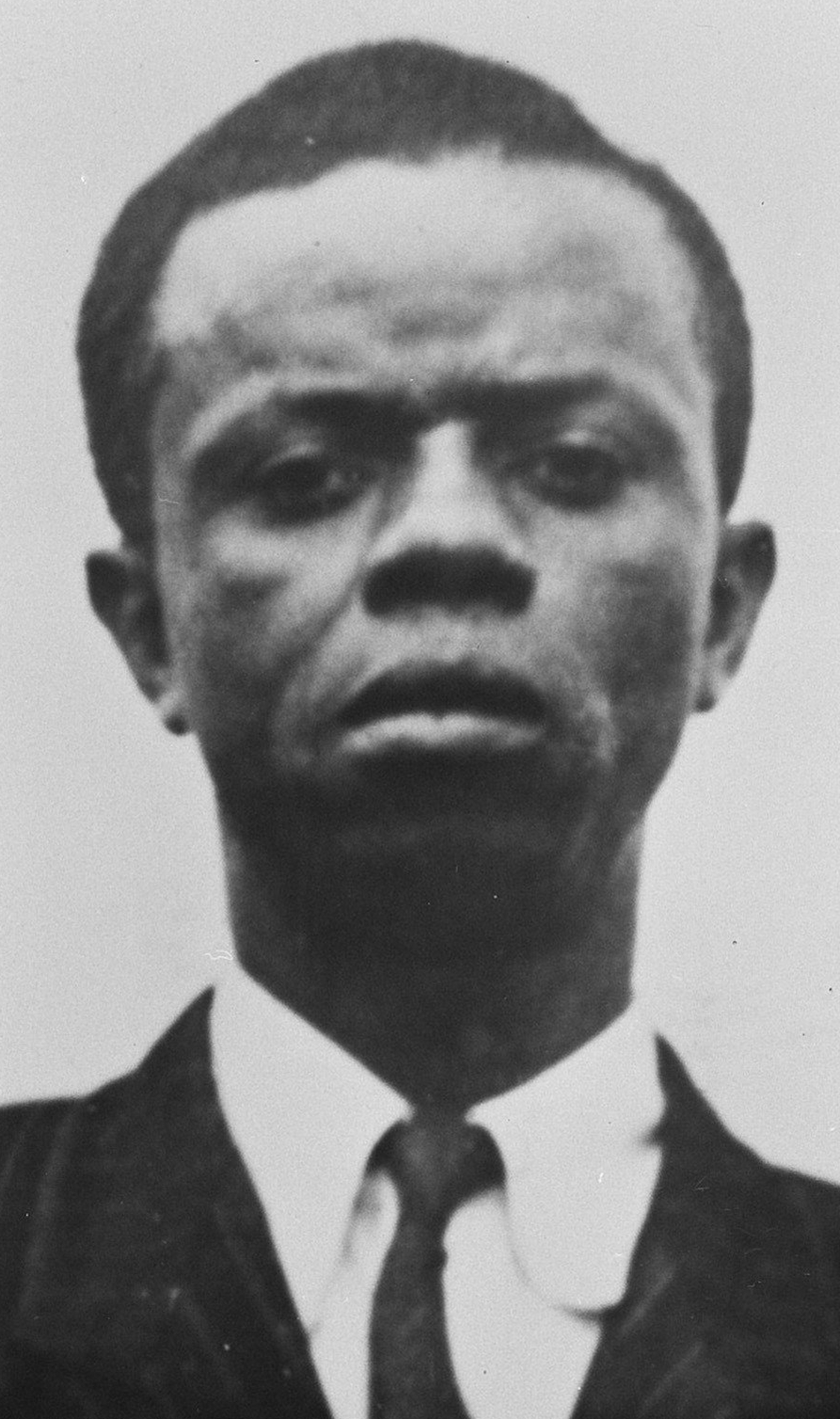
Joseph Iléo

The 1960 elections were characterized by trivial political competition and highly populist campaign promises, such as the abolition of taxes or labor obligations after independence. Electoral competition was heavily influenced by ethnic and regional considerations. In Katanga, BALUBAKAT mobilized around ethnic exclusivism; Congolese National Movement-Lumumba (MNC-L) and LUNC allied against Congolese National Movement-Kalonji (MNC-Kalonji), which was largely supported by Baluba from Kasaï; ABAKO was dominated by the Bakongo; CEREA drew its base from the various ethnic groups of Kivu; and PUNA relied mainly on voters from Équateur. In the national legislative elections, the MNC-L secured the most significant number of seats with 36 deputies, followed by ABAKO with 12, while the remaining seats were distributed among other parties. These results led to the formation of the first government under Prime Minister Patrice Émery Lumumba on 21 June 1960. In the subsequent presidential vote, Joseph Kasa-Vubu was indirectly elected by the senate with 159 votes, defeating Jean Bolikango, who received 44 votes, while 11 ballots were declared invalid. From 30 June 1960, the day following independence, widespread disorder engulfed the country and rendered the newly created institutions ineffective. The ensuing crisis persisted until 1965 and was driven by Lumumba's assassination, the collapse of negotiations at the Lovanium Conclave, convened to unite political forces under Cyrille Adoula, the fragmentation of the state, and the repeated failures of the governments led by Joseph Iléo and Cyrille Adoula.

=== The 1965 electoral process ===
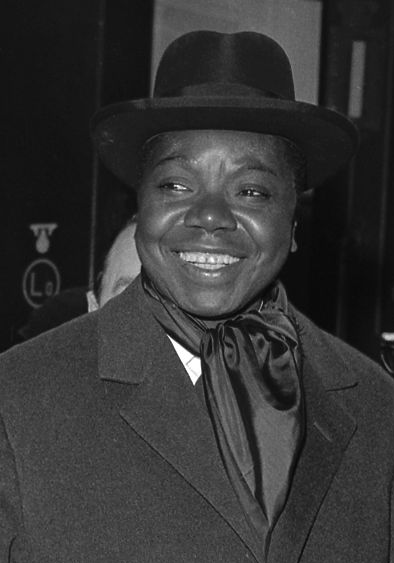
Moïse Tshombe in France, 1963

The 1965 elections were organized under the government of Moïse Tshombe, who had recently returned from exile and was entrusted with ending the prolonged crisis, restoring peace, and ensuring that electoral deadlines were respected. This period created favorable conditions for the reorganization of political forces that had previously been weakened or fragmented by rebellion, secession, and exile. Tshombe initiated the Congolese National Convention (Convention Nationale Congolaise, contracted as CONACO), a broad coalition that brought together 49 political parties and associations based mainly on ethnic affiliations. At the same time, nationalist movements, including the MNC-L, regrouped and restructured after having been dispersed by conflict and exile.

The elections began on 20 February 1965 and concluded on 1 April 1965, with delays caused by security concerns and communication difficulties. CONACO won a decisive victory and secured 122 of the 167 parliamentary seats. However, serious electoral irregularities were reported in several regions that had previously experienced rebellion, including Kwilu, eastern Kivu, Goma, Rutshuru, Fizi, Maniema, and the Cuvette Centrale. Due to these irregularities, such as the absence of ballot boxes and voter intimidation, the Léopoldville Court of Appeal invalidated the election results in those areas.

The aftermath of the elections was marked by intense political disputes and numerous legal challenges that severely undermined the political life. As the mandates of both Tshombe's transitional government and President Joseph Kasa-Vubu approached their end, tensions escalated between the two leaders. Kasa-Vubu argued that Tshombe's government should step down once the final election results were announced and parliament convened, whereas Tshombe insisted on remaining in office until the presidential election scheduled for December 1965. On 13 October, President Kasa-Vubu dismissed Tshombe's cabinet before an extraordinary session of parliament and appointed Évariste Kimba to form a new government. Kimba failed to gain parliamentary confidence, receiving 134 votes against him out of 262, yet Kasa-Vubu nevertheless confirmed his appointment. This climate of political deadlock, compounded by multiple tensions and personal rivalries, ultimately paved the way for the coup d'état of 24 November 1965.

=== Elections under the Second Republic ===
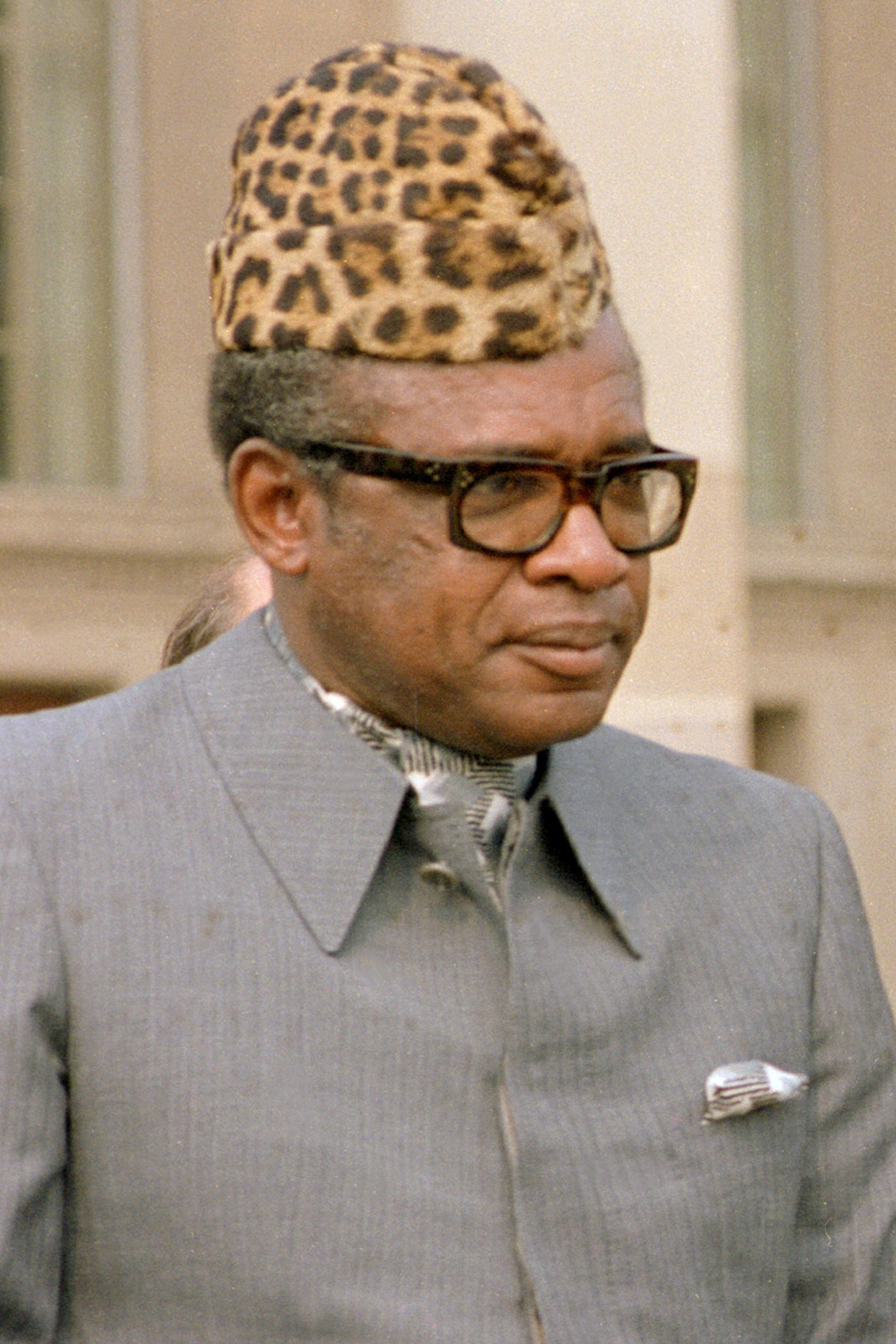
Mobutu Sese Seko sporting a typical abacost in 1983.

To break the political deadlock that paralyzed the country, the Armée nationale congolaise (ANC) intervened on 24 November 1965, sidelined civilian politicians, and granted General Mobutu Sese Seko full authority for a five-year period. All political activities were suspended, and existing parties were dissolved in favor of a single ruling party, the Popular Movement of the Revolution (Mouvement Populaire de la Révolution; MPR), officially established in 1967. Within this one-party framework, presidential and legislative elections were held in 1970. Mobutu was the only presidential candidate and was declared elected to a seven-year term beginning on 4 December 1970, reportedly receiving 10,131,669 votes. Legislative elections followed on 14 and 15 November 1970, with candidates appearing exclusively on the party's official list.

These elections were tightly controlled by the ruling party and presented as orderly, which led to the selection of disciplined party members loyal to the regime and committed to maintaining its authority. From that point onward, political life increasingly reflected the radicalization of the single-party system, which gradually merged with the state apparatus and became the country's sole institution. Power became progressively concentrated in the hands of the party leader, who was simultaneously head of state and portrayed as the "father of the nation". Subsequent elections were therefore conducted entirely within the framework of the party-state.

In 1982, under pressure from Western governments, in response to rebel incursions in Katanga, and following opposition from 13 parliamentarians, Ordinance-Law No. 82/006 of 25 February 1982 was enacted to reorganize the country's political, administrative, and territorial structure. This decentralization led to elections for zone commissioners (commissaires des zones), councillors, and People's Commissioners (commissaires du peuple) in newly defined constituencies. Candidates continued to be nominated through party-state lists, and the electoral process was supplemented by a system of appointment after results were announced. Victory at the polls was no longer sufficient; candidates were also required to demonstrate loyalty and active commitment to the leader. Elected officials could lose their mandates for acts of indiscipline. In 1984, a nationwide scientific population census was conducted, followed by a presidential election in which Mobutu, as the sole candidate, was re-elected with 99.98 percent of the vote. The last elections held in Zaire occurred in 1987 and concerned the Legislative Council, Provincial Assemblies, Rural Collectivities, and Urban Zones.

=== The 2001–2006 transitional period ===
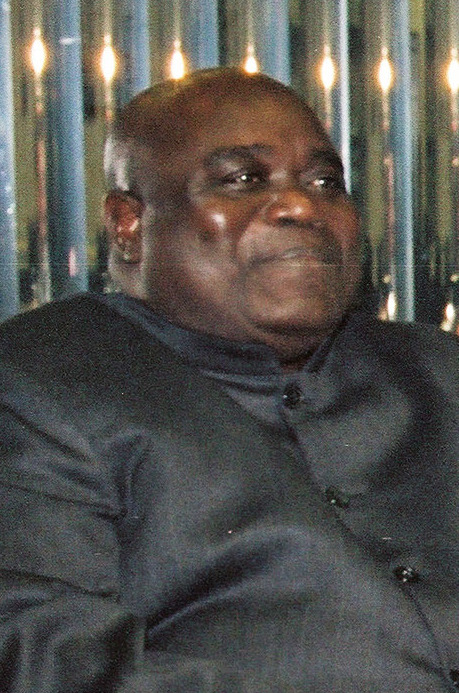
Laurent-Désiré Kabila (pictured in November 1998), who succeeded Mobutu, served as the third president of the Democratic Republic of the Congo from 1997 until his assassination in 2001.

Following several days of uncertainty and tension after the assassination of Laurent-Désiré Kabila, nicknamed M'Zee ("the wise one"), the provisional parliament opted for a dynastic succession and, on 24 January 2001, appointed Major General Joseph Kabila as president of the republic. At only 29 years of age, the new head of state initially governed under the supervision of a regency council in which "three cousins of his father were members". Joseph Kabila inherited a vast country fragmented into three conflict-ridden zones where state authority had largely collapsed, surviving mainly in Kinshasa.

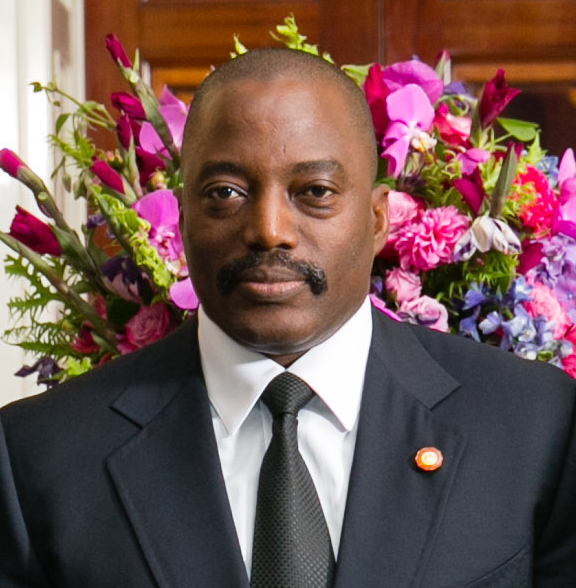
Joseph Kabila (pictured in 2014) succeeded his father, Laurent-Désiré Kabila, after his assassination in 2001, becoming the fourth president of the Democratic Republic of the Congo and serving from 2001 to 2019.

In his first address to the nation on 26 January 2001, then the youngest president in the world, Joseph Kabila pledged to liberalize the political system left by his father. He expressed appreciation toward France, reaffirmed historical ties with Belgium, and announced his intention to normalize relations with the new George W. Bush administration. Overall, early indications suggested continuity rather than rupture, with the regime of "Kabila Junior" appearing as an extension of that of "Kabila Senior", itself rooted in the legacy of Mobutu and, further back, that of King Leopold II. The most notable anticipated change following Laurent-Désiré Kabila's death was the possible gradual withdrawal of foreign troops under United Nations Security Council supervision. Despite these expectations, the country continued to be engulfed in ethnic conflicts, which accentuated the paradox of a state whose immense size had become a source of instability. To overcome the persistent legitimacy crisis and lay the foundations for national reconstruction, representatives of political parties and civil society convened within the framework of the Inter-Congolese Dialogue. This process culminated in the signing of the Global and Inclusive Agreement in Pretoria on 17 December 2002, which established a new political order grounded in a democratic constitution and aimed at enabling Congolese citizens to choose their leaders through "free, pluralistic, transparent, and credible elections". This agreement marked the beginning of the DRC's transition, formalized through a constitution drafted in accordance with the Sun City accords.

During the transition, governance was guided by two key reference texts, notably the Global and Inclusive Agreement, which set out the principles governing transitional institutions. Central among these principles was the equitable sharing of responsibilities among the various components of the Inter-Congolese Dialogue at all levels of the state. An annex to the Global and Inclusive Agreement specified the distribution of ministries and vice-ministries among the different factions, while institutional functioning was based on consensus, inclusiveness, and the avoidance of confrontation. To preserve institutional stability, key officials, including the President, the four Vice-Presidents, and the heads of the National Assembly and the Senate, remained in office throughout the transition.

The objectives of the transitional constitution included national reunification, pacification and reconstruction, restoration of territorial integrity, the creation of a unified and restructured national army, and the organization of democratic elections at all levels. The transition was scheduled to last 24 months, with a possible six-month extension renewable once if necessary. Executive power was exercised collectively, with the president at the head and ministries distributed among the four Vice-Presidents through thematic commissions: the Economic and Financial Commission led by Jean-Pierre Bemba, the Defense and Security Commission under Azarias Ruberwa, the Reconstruction and Development Commission headed by Abdoulaye Yerodia Ndombasi, and the Sociocultural Commission chaired by Arthur Z'ahidi Ngoma. Through this arrangement, the country's three major political currents shared state leadership alongside numerous other groups that emerged from the conflict. Étienne Tshisekedi, the most prominent opposition leader, declined to take part, boycotting the partial elections organized by the non-armed opposition under the auspices of the United Nations Mission in the Democratic Republic of Congo (MONUC) and therefore remained outside the transitional government. The transition formally ended with the proclamation of the Third Republic on 18 February 2006.

=== Elections under the Third Republic ===
The Third Republic officially began on 17 August 2006, following the promulgation of the electoral law and the allocation of parliamentary seats. The commission électorale de transition (CET) imposed a very tight electoral timetable on itself by scheduling the presidential and legislative elections for 28 November, which left only three months and eleven days for preparation. Although the constitutional deadline of 30 June marking the end of the transition had already passed, a minimum period of four months and twenty days following the publication of the electoral law, between 9 March and 30 July, was considered necessary. Voter participation in the 2006 presidential election reached 70.5 percent in the first round and 65.4 percent in the runoff.

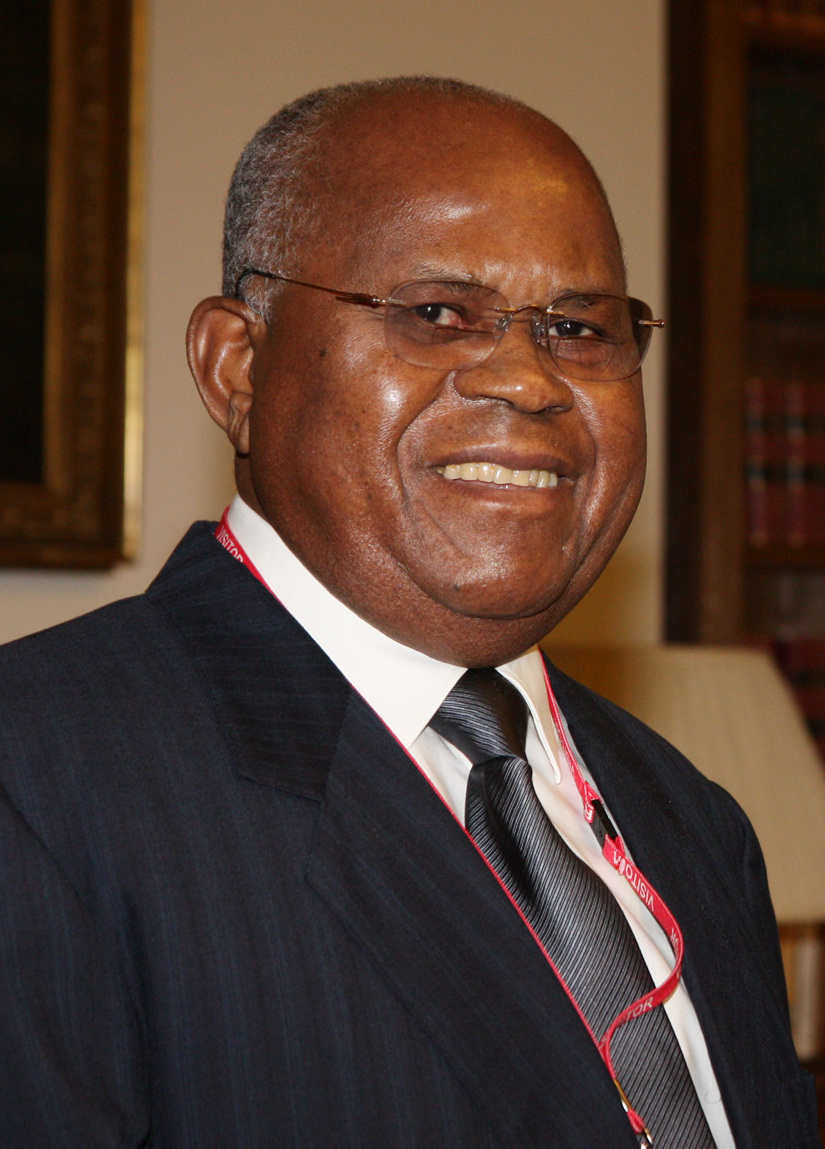
Étienne Tshisekedi

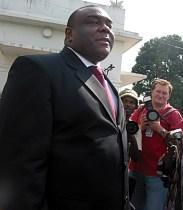
Jean-Pierre Bemba

A second round was required because none of the 33 presidential candidates "managed to obtain more than 50% of the total votes" held on 30 July 2006. The runoff therefore pitted the two candidates with the highest scores from the first round against each other. During this initial phase, the Congolese Rally for Democracy (RCD) raised concerns about an alleged surplus of voter cards, estimating an excess of nearly 20 percent above the authorized number. The party claimed that these cards were distributed nationwide without proper notification to political parties and that over 1,100,000 voters' names had disappeared from the voters' register. Reports from the SADC Parliamentary Forum's election observation mission raised concerns about bias and electoral fraud within specific institutions. For example, teams stationed in Kinshasa constantly spoke of the problem of excess ballot papers. The Independent Electoral Commission (Commission Electorale Indépendante; CEI) had printed five million additional ballot papers beyond the authorized quota, which fueled public suspicion that the CET intended to manipulate the process or favor certain political parties. Violence was reported, notably in Mbuji-Mayi in Kasaï-Oriental, a stronghold of the UDPS, which had called for an election boycott. Electoral convoys were often attacked, and at least one vehicle transporting election materials was set on fire.

Despite these tensions, the candidate registration process proceeded smoothly, resulting in the validation of 33 presidential candidates and over 9,000 legislative candidates. Electoral law allowed dissatisfied candidates and parties to challenge results through the courts. The second round of the presidential election pitted incumbent President Joseph Kabila against Vice-President Jean-Pierre Bemba, while 13,474 candidates competed for 623 seats in 24 provincial assemblies. On 24 October 2006, millions of Congolese voters cast their ballots in 50,045 polling stations nationwide during the second and final round of the presidential election, held concurrently with provincial elections. Voter turnout patterns reinforced the credibility of the process, revealing strong support for Bemba in Kinshasa, Bas-Congo, Kasaï-Occidental, and Équateur, and for Kabila in Orientale, Katanga, South Kivu, North Kivu, and Maniema. On 20 August 2006, the CEI released provisional presidential and legislative results. According to these figures, 25,420,199 voters were registered, 17,931,238 participated, with 122,946 blank votes and 870,758 invalid ballots, resulting in 16,937,534 valid votes and a turnout rate of 70.54 percent.

By contrast, the elections held on 28 November 2011 were widely criticized, and Anderson Ntumba of the University of Lubumbashi described them as technically regular but lacking credibility. Observers cited systemic failures, post-electoral imposition, and insufficient democratic oversight. Initially, the CEI refused to publish partial presidential results, a stance the opposition interpreted as a lack of transparency. The Independent National Electoral Commission (Commission Électorale Nationale Indépendante; CENI) later released five partial provincial results for a "certain number of polling stations without specifying which territories or cities they corresponded to, and without even proclaiming the national total to which the different figures added up". Moreover, these results were never posted on the CENI website.

On 9 December 2011, CENI declared Joseph Kabila the winner of the 28 November presidential election. Opposition leader Étienne Tshisekedi immediately rejected the results and proclaimed himself president-elect, which then triggered violent incidents in Kinshasa, an opposition stronghold, and reviving fears that the DRC might slide into internal conflict. That same day, speaking on the France 24 television channel, he refused to appeal to the Supreme Court of Justice, stating: "This court is a private institution of Mr. Kabila. We cannot do them the honor of appealing to [the judges of the court]. That would be to recognize a certain legitimacy. I will never do that". Nevertheless, Kabila was credited with 48.95 percent of the vote against Tshisekedi's 32.33 percent, though these figures remained contested. Joseph Kabila was officially sworn in on 20 December 2011.

==== The 2016–2017 political transition ====
The political transition that began in 2017 was triggered by the authorities' failure to organize elections scheduled for the end of 2016. In response to this deadlock, a political agreement was reached between the ruling party and the opposition, which provided for elections in 2017 and the eventual departure of President Kabila. Under this arrangement, the government and opposition were to jointly oversee the country during the transitional period between the expiration of Kabila's mandate on 20 December 2016 and the election of his successor, initially expected by the end of 2017.

Despite the expiration of his constitutional term, Kabila remained in office throughout 2017, having governed since 2001. In the final hours of 2016, representatives of the presidential majority and opposition met in Kinshasa under the mediation of the National Episcopal Conference of the Congo (Conférence Épiscopale Nationale du Congo; CENCO) and signed a "global and inclusive agreement" governing the transition. This accord incorporated two key measures that effectively delayed the electoral process by more than a year: a comprehensive revision of the electoral register and the organization of three elections simultaneously. Although political negotiations postponed the elections from 2016 to late 2017, the CENI unilaterally announced a further one-year delay. Since 2011, CENI had consistently argued that elections could not be held without political consensus on critical issues such as the sequencing of polls, voter registration, and voting procedures.

From late 2017 onward, the electoral commission imposed a revised calendar and controversial technical choices, including a disputed voter register and the introduction of voting machines. On 5 November 2017, CENI effectively confirmed another postponement by publishing a new comprehensive electoral calendar, thirty-three months after the initial schedule. The new date of 23 December 2018 for the three combined elections appeared to reflect a fragile compromise, but it was again missed when CENI postponed the vote to 30 December 2018.

==== The 2018–2023 electoral process ====
The elections planned for 23 December 2018 were expected to mark the Democratic Republic of the Congo's first democratic transfer of power. The stakes were historic, as this third electoral cycle was intended to complete the peace process launched with the Sun City Agreement of 19 April 2002, which ended the Second Congo War and enabled the adoption of a new constitution and the establishment of democratic institutions. The 2018 elections, already delayed by two years, were meant to consolidate democracy by facilitating, for the first time since independence, a handover of power between an outgoing president and a newly elected successor. After seventeen years in office, Kabila was constitutionally barred from seeking another term.

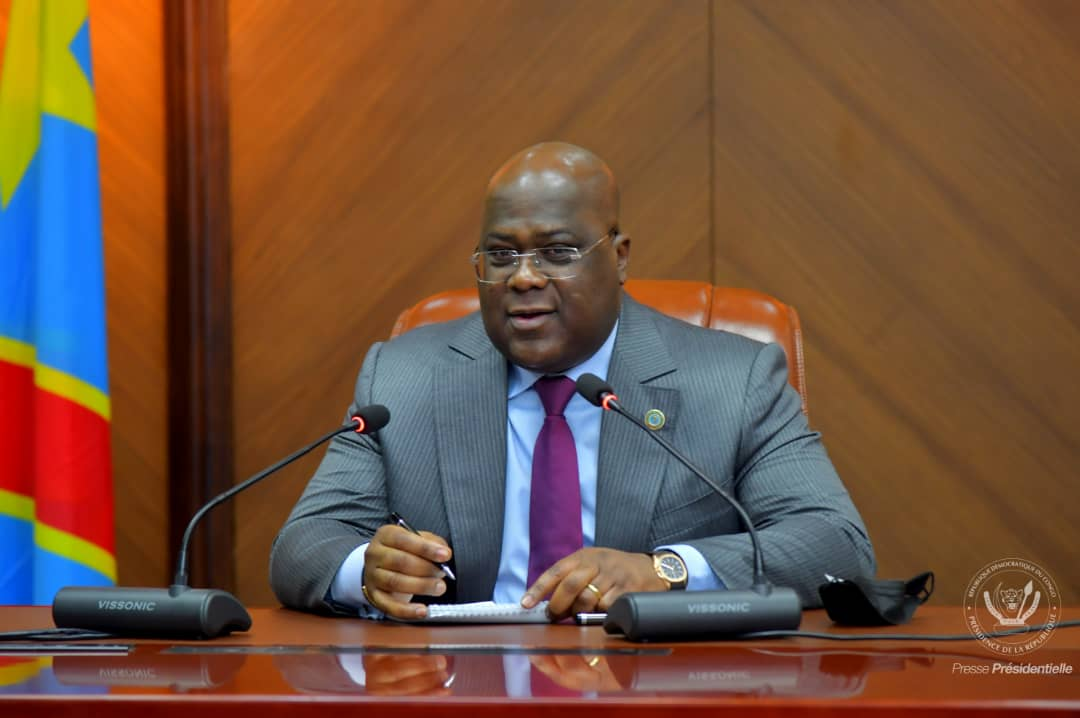
Félix Tshisekedi (pictured in October 2021) succeeded Joseph Kabila after being sworn in on 24 January 2019, becoming the fifth president of the Democratic Republic of the Congo and the first to assume office through a peaceful transfer of power.

Ultimately held on 30 December 2018, the presidential election took place alongside legislative and provincial polls. The campaign centered on three main candidates: Emmanuel Ramazani Shadary, designated successor of Kabila; Félix Tshisekedi, son of longtime opposition leader Étienne Tshisekedi; and Martin Fayulu, the joint candidate of part of the opposition. According to provisional results, Félix Tshisekedi won with just over 38 percent of the vote, followed by Martin Fayulu with nearly 35 percent, while Shadary placed third with about 23 percent. The results were immediately disputed by Fayulu, and CENCO declared that they did not align with data collected by its 40,000 election observers. At the same time, legislative election results granted an overwhelming two-thirds majority to the outgoing ruling coalition, the Common Front for Congo, signaling a future cohabitation that many believed undermined the significance of the presidential alternation. The authorities were accused of engineering an arrangement in which Tshisekedi was allowed to win the presidency, while Kabila's camp retained control of key institutions through its dominance in parliament and provincial assemblies. This control also ensured influence over the Senate, where Kabila, as a senator for life, would continue to wield power.

In January 2019, after the dismissal of all legal challenges, the Constitutional Court confirmed Félix Tshisekedi's victory, and he was sworn in as president. He thus became the country's fifth head of state and the first to assume office through a peaceful transfer of power.

Tshisekedi was reelected with a large majority in December 2023, coming ahead of Moise Katumbi and Fayulu.

== Upcoming elections ==
2024 Election schedule and status as of 12 May 2025
Public start	Election day	Election	Type	Status
1 Feb	29 Apr	Senate and gubernatorial	indirect	check
1 Feb	2 May	South Kivu governor runoff	indirect	check
1 Feb	24 May	Equateur senators and governor	indirect	check
1 Feb	24 May	Ituri senators	indirect	check
5 Apr	26 May	Mai-Ndombe and North Kivu senators	indirect	check
5 Apr	26 May	Mai-Ndombe governor	indirect	check
24 Apr	19 Jun	Commune burgomasters and city councils	indirect	Indefinitely delayed after candidate registration
26 Jul	7 Sep	City mayors	indirect	Indefinitely delayed
14 Nov	15 Dec	Yakoma and Masimanimba national and provincial deputies do-over	direct	check
29 Mar 2025	2 Apr 2025	Kwilu and Nord-Ubangi senators and governors	indirect	check

== Elections of the 4th cycle (2023–2028) ==
=== Presidential ===
Candidate	Party	Votes	%
Félix Tshisekedi	Union for Democracy and Social Progress (Democratic Republic of the Congo)	13,058,962	73.47
Moïse Katumbi	Together for the Republic	3,256,572	18.32
Martin Fayulu	Commitment to Citizenship and Development	875,336	4.92
Adolphe Muzito	New Momentum	200,800	1.13
Soborabo Radjabho Tebabho	Congolese United for Change	70,099	0.39
Denis Mukwege	Independent	39,639	0.22
Aggrey Ngalasi Kurisini	Independent	37,201	0.21
Constant Mutamba	Revolutionary Progressive Dynamic	36,197	0.20
Jean-Claude Baende	Independent	25,584	0.14
Delly Sesanga	Flight	17,785	0.10
Loli Nkema Liloo Bokonzi	Independent	17,046	0.10
Patrice Majondo Mwamba	Independent	15,793	0.09
Marie-Josée Ifoku	Independent	15,266	0.09
Matata Ponyo Mapon	Leadership and Governance for Development	14,181	0.08
André Masalu Anedu	Independent	13,974	0.08
Floribert Anzuluni	Independent	13,707	0.08
Noël K. Tshiani Muadiamvita	Independent	9,276	0.05
Seth Kikuni	Independent	8,621	0.05
Justin Mudekereza Bisimwa	Independent	7,573	0.04
Joëlle Bile Batali	Independent	6,911	0.04
Franck Diongo	Progressive Lumumbist Movement	6,780	0.04
Tony Bolamba	Independent	6,307	0.04
Rex Kazadi Kanda	Independent	5,757	0.03
Georges Buse Falay	Independent	5,288	0.03
Enoch Ngila	Independent	5,156	0.03
Théodore Ngoy	Independent	4,132	0.02
Total		17,773,943	100.00

=== National Assembly ===
Party or alliance		Votes	%	Seats
Sacred Union of the Nation	Union for Democracy and Social Progress (Democratic Republic of the Congo)	1,664,049	9.26	69
Sacred Union of the Nation	Allied Actions–Union for the Congolese Nation	903,928	5.03	34
Sacred Union of the Nation	Alliance of Democratic Forces of Congo	890,753	4.96	35
Sacred Union of the Nation	Agissons and Buildings	752,559	4.19	26
Sacred Union of the Nation	Allied Actions–All for the Development of Congo	692,491	3.85	21
Sacred Union of the Nation	Alliance of actors attached to the people	649,226	3.61	21
Sacred Union of the Nation	Alliance bloc 50	546,079	3.04	20
Sacred Union of the Nation	Movement for the Liberation of the Congo	471,375	2.62	19
Sacred Union of the Nation	Alliance for the Advent of a Prosperous and Greater Congo	532,066	2.96	16
Sacred Union of the Nation	Alternative Action of Actors for the Love of Congo	392,140	2.18	16
Sacred Union of the Nation	Alliance 2024	443,859	2.47	15
Sacred Union of the Nation	It's up to us to build the Congo	379,135	2.11	13
Sacred Union of the Nation	Congo Allied Action for the Convention	390,161	2.17	10
Sacred Union of the Nation	Coalition of Democrats	431,028	2.40	9
Sacred Union of the Nation	Actions of the Allies of the Convention for the Republic and Democracy	320,370	1.78	9
Sacred Union of the Nation	Alliance of Progressive Congolese and Allies	260,392	1.45	9
Sacred Union of the Nation	Alliance for Democratic Alternation and Allies	336,813	1.87	8
Sacred Union of the Nation	Action for National Unity	239,969	1.33	8
Sacred Union of the Nation	Audible Actions for Good Governance	191,056	1.06	8
Sacred Union of the Nation	Alliance for Values	330,813	1.84	7
Sacred Union of the Nation	Alliance for the Triple and Allies	305,728	1.70	7
Sacred Union of the Nation	Allied Action for the Rise of the Congo	284,205	1.58	7
Sacred Union of the Nation	Alliance of Nationalists	277,460	1.54	7
Sacred Union of the Nation	Actions of Convention Allies–Unified Lumumbist Party	215,877	1.20	8
Sacred Union of the Nation	Alliance for the Solidarity Movement for Change	291,226	1.62	6
Sacred Union of the Nation	Alliances of Unified and Allied Tshisekedists	287,996	1.60	6
Sacred Union of the Nation	Another Vision of Congo and Allies	187,358	1.04	5
Sacred Union of the Nation	Alliance and Action for the Rule of Law	258,255	1.44	4
Sacred Union of the Nation	Political and Social Forces Allied to the UDPS	206,721	1.15	4
Sacred Union of the Nation	Christian Alternative for Congo	190,606	1.06	4
Sacred Union of the Nation	Alliance 2025	232,648	1.29	3
Sacred Union of the Nation	Alternative Vital Kamerhe 2018	200,899	1.12	3
Sacred Union of the Nation	UDPS/KIBASSA–A	180,054	1.00	2
Sacred Union of the Nation	Alliance of Political Parties Allied to the Movement for the Liberation of the Congo	179,929	1.00	2
Sacred Union of the Nation	Alliance for the Reform of the Republic	179,877	1.00	2
Sacred Union of the Nation	Action for the Federative Cause	179,847	1.00	2
Sacred Union of the Nation	Alliance for the Growth and Democracy of Congo	221,869	1.23	1
Sacred Union of the Nation	Alliance for Development Actions in Congo	191,053	1.06	1
Sacred Union of the Nation	Allied Action for the Love of the Republic/Convention for the Republic	179,851	1.00	0
Sacred Union of the Nation	Rally of Tshisekediast Democrats	105,046	0.58	0
Sacred Union of the Nation	Action for the Breakthrough and Development and Allies	104,876	0.58	0
Sacred Union of the Nation	Alliance of Christian Democrats of Congo	99,748	0.55	0
Sacred Union of the Nation	Alliance of Democrats for the Emergence of Congo and Allies	33,163	0.18	0
Sacred Union of the Nation	New Conscious Generation	12,862	0.07	0
Sacred Union of the Nation	Total	15,425,416	85.81	447
Together for the Republic		497,009	2.76	18
Avançons-MS		202,750	1.13	5
Alliance of Elites in the Service of the People and Allies		179,953	1.00	0
New Momentum		179,870	1.00	3
Dynamique Progressive Revolutionnaire		179,834	1.00	3
Alternation		138,175	0.77	0
Action of the Allies		114,970	0.64	0
The Progressives		110,461	0.61	0
Action of the Allies Acquired to Democracy		104,841	0.58	0
Alliance of Democrats for Renewal and Progress		101,786	0.57	0
Leadership and Governance for Development		75,944	0.42	1
Lumbist Social Movement		66,536	0.37	0
Action of the Nationalist Allies for Democracy		66,106	0.37	0
Actions of the Allies for Democracy and Development		61,046	0.34	0
Let's Act 7		50,943	0.28	0
Popular Awakening		49,105	0.27	0
Action for Reconstruction and Work and Allies		47,842	0.27	0
Alliance for the Development and Integrity of the Homeland		41,731	0.23	0
New Political Order on the Horizon 2023 in the Democratic Republic of Congo		37,416	0.21	0
Alliance of Reformers for a New Leadership		36,090	0.20	0
Patriotic Front 2023		33,383	0.19	0
Alliance of the Congolese for the Refoundation of the Nation		32,866	0.18	0
Party of the Flight of the DR.Congo		29,129	0.16	0
Mbonda		24,692	0.14	0
Citizen Alternative		13,763	0.08	0
Congolese United for Change		10,004	0.06	0
Love of the Neighbor and the Part of Congo		5,471	0.03	0
Independents		59,419	0.33	0
Annulled seats		0	0.00	7
No election		0	0.00	16
Total		17,976,551	100.00	500

== See also ==
- Electoral calendar
- Electoral system
- Independent National Electoral Commission
- Mass media in the Democratic Republic of the Congo
