= United Nations Security Council Resolution 1493 =

2003 resolution on the Democratic Republic of the Congo

UN Security Council Resolution 1493
- Democratic Republic of the Congo
- Date: 28 July 2003
- Meeting no.: 4,797
- Code: S/RES/1493 (Document)
- Subject: The situation concerning the Democratic Republic of the Congo
- Voting summary: 15 voted for; None voted against; None abstained
- Result: Adopted

Security Council composition
- Permanent members: China; France; Russia; United Kingdom; United States
- Non-permanent members: Angola; Bulgaria; Chile; Cameroon; Germany; Guinea; Mexico; Pakistan; Spain; Syria

United Nations Security Council resolution 1493, adopted unanimously on 28 July 2003, after recalling all resolutions on the situation in the Democratic Republic of the Congo, the council extended the mandate of the United Nations Mission in the Democratic Republic of Congo (MONUC) until 30 July 2004 and raised its troop level from 8,700 to 10,800.

Under previous mandates, MONUC was allowed to use force only in self-defense; the current resolution expanded this to include "all necessary means" to fulfill its mandate. The MONUC mission had difficulties implementing Resolution 1493 due to ambiguous references in the text, an issue later addressed by the secretary-general who criticised the lack of specific tasks given to the operation under this resolution.

== Resolution ==
=== Observations ===
The security council reaffirmed its commitment to the sovereignty, territorial integrity and independence of the Democratic Republic of the Congo and states in the African Great Lakes region, while noting the obligation of states to refrain from the use of force against another. There was concern at the continuing illegal exploitation of the natural resources of the country and at the conflicts in Ituri, North and South Kivu. It welcomed the establishment of a transitional government and urged all parties to co-operate with MONUC.

The preamble of the resolution reiterated the council's support of Operation Artemis in Bunia and the need to replace the force once its mandate had expired, in accordance with Resolution 1484 (2003).

=== Acts ===
Acting under Chapter VII of the United Nations Charter, the council was satisfied at the establishment of a transitional government and called for further steps by Congolese parties to allow it to function. The Secretary-General Kofi Annan was requested to assist in this process and the MONUC's troop level was raised to 10,800 personnel. Furthermore, during the transition period, MONUC was instructed to assist in a reform of the security services; establish a state based on rule of law; and preparations for the holding of elections. In the first months of the new transitional government, MONUC could participate in maintaining security in the capital Kinshasa.

The resolution strongly condemned acts of violence against civilians, including massacres, violations of human rights and international humanitarian law, and sexual violence, calling for the perpetrators to be brought to justice. In accordance with Resolution 1325 (2000), there was a need for a gender perspective in peacekeeping operations and to address violence against women and girls. It reaffirmed that all Congolese parties had an obligation to respect human rights and urged the transitional government to ensure their protection and establish an independent judiciary as one of its highest priorities.

The security council stated its "profound preoccupation" with the humanitarian situation throughout the Democratic Republic of the Congo and condemned the use of child soldiers in the fighting in the east of the country. In this regard, the Congolese parties were asked to provide information on measures to prevent the use and recruitment of child soldiers in accordance with resolution 1261 (1999) and 1460 (2003).

Meanwhile, it condemned hostilities in the east of the country, particularly ceasefire violations and armed offensives by the Rally for Congolese Democracy-Goma (RCD-Goma). The resolution urged all Congolese parties to refrain from interfering in the freedom of movement of United Nations personnel and that the armed conflict was preventing MONUC from carrying out its disarmament, demobilisation, repatriation, reintegration and resettlement (DDRRR) process of foreign armed groups. All states in the region, including the Democratic Republic of the Congo itself, were called upon to end support for and assistance to armed groups in the country.

Addressing the conflict in the Kivus and Ituri in the east of the country, the council demanded unimpeded access to MONUC personnel to all areas, requested the secretary-general to deploy military observers in North and South Kivu and Ituri, and imposed an arms embargo against foreign and Congolese armed groups operating in the regions. The embargo would not apply to MONUC, Operation Artemis, integrated Congolese army and police forces, or non-lethal military equipment for humanitarian or protective use. The council declared that the measures would be reviewed in twelve months and compliance would be closely monitored.

MONUC was tasked with protecting United Nations personnel and facilities; ensuring its freedom of movement; protecting civilians and humanitarian workers; contributing to an improvement in the security situation. The council stated it could use all necessary means to fulfill its mandate. The illicit exploitation of natural resources in the Democratic Republic of the Congo was condemned and a report from an expert panel was anticipated regarding the matter. The governments of Burundi, the Democratic Republic of the Congo, Rwanda and Uganda were urged to normalise their diplomatic relations, while an international conference on peace and security in the Great Lakes region was urged.

== See also ==
- Kivu conflict
- Ituri conflict
- List of United Nations Security Council Resolutions 1401 to 1500 (2002–2003)
- Lusaka Ceasefire Agreement
- Second Congo War
- United Nations Security Council Resolution 1533
- United Nations Security Council Resolution 1807
