= United Nations Security Council Resolution 1565 =

UN Security Council Resolution 1565
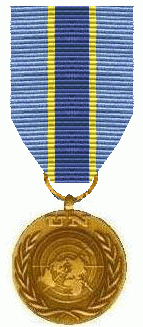
- MONUC medal
- Date: 1 October 2004
- Meeting no.: 5,048
- Code: S/RES/1565 (Document)
- Subject: The situation concerning the Democratic Republic of the Congo
- Voting summary: 15 voted for; None voted against; None abstained
- Result: Adopted

Security Council composition
- Permanent members: China; France; Russia; United Kingdom; United States
- Non-permanent members: Algeria; Angola; Benin; Brazil; Chile; Germany; Pakistan; Philippines; Romania; Spain

United Nations Security Council resolution 1565, adopted unanimously on 1 October 2004 after recalling all previous resolutions on the situation in the Democratic Republic of the Congo, extended the mandate of the United Nations Mission in the Democratic Republic of Congo (MONUC) until 31 March 2005 and authorised an additional deployment of 5,900 troops and police. It reaffirmed the commitment to respect the “sovereignty, territorial integrity and political independence [sic]” of Congo and States in the region.

The increase in the size of MONUC was ordered following the Secretary-General Kofi Annan's call for additional troops, though the 5,900 additional personnel was lower than he had recommended. The adoption of Resolution 1565 marked the beginning of one of the largest and most rapid reconfigurations of a United Nations peacekeeping mission ever attempted.

== Resolution ==
=== Observations ===
The preamble of the resolution reflected the Council's concern at ongoing hostilities in the east of the Democratic Republic of the Congo and widespread violations of human rights and international humanitarian law. It reaffirmed that all parties involved in the conflict were responsible for the safety of civilians in the region.

=== Acts ===
Acting under Chapter VII of the United Nations Charter, the council extended MONUC's mandate and authorised an increase of 5,900 personnel, with deployments in North and South Kivu. MONUC's newly expanded mandate was to include:

(a) monitoring and maintaining a presence in key areas;
(b) protecting civilians, aid workers and United Nations facilities;
(c) establish links with the United Nations Operation in Burundi (ONUB) and the Burundian and Congolese governments;
(d) monitor measures imposed in Resolution 1493 (2003);
(e) seize and dispose of weapons and materiel in the country that violate Resolution 1493;
(f) observe movements of armed groups and foreign military forces;
(g) protect government institutions, officials and maintain order;
(h) assist with security and the voluntary return of refugees;
(i) contribute to the demobilisation, disarmament and repatriation of combatants;
(j) assist in the electoral process and human rights.

MONUC was also called upon to support the transitional government and three joint commissions on security sector reform, legislation and the electoral process. Furthermore, MONUC was authorised to use "all necessary means" to enforce its mandate. Meanwhile, the governments of Burundi, the Democratic Republic of the Congo, Rwanda and Uganda were asked not to allow their territory to be used to infringe upon the sovereignty of another. The council urged full intergovernmental co-operation and condemned all violations of human rights. It again reaffirmed the link between the illegal exploitation of natural resources and armed conflict, and welcomed the convening of an international conference on peace and security in the African Great Lakes region.

Finally, the security council expressed concern about allegations of sexual abuse and misconduct of MONUC personnel, asking the Secretary-General to investigate such reports and take appropriate action.

== See also ==
- Kivu conflict
- Ituri conflict
- List of United Nations Security Council Resolutions 1501 to 1600 (2003–2005)
- Second Congo War
