= Babacar Gaye =

Senegalese Army General (born 1951)

Lieutenant General Babacar Gaye
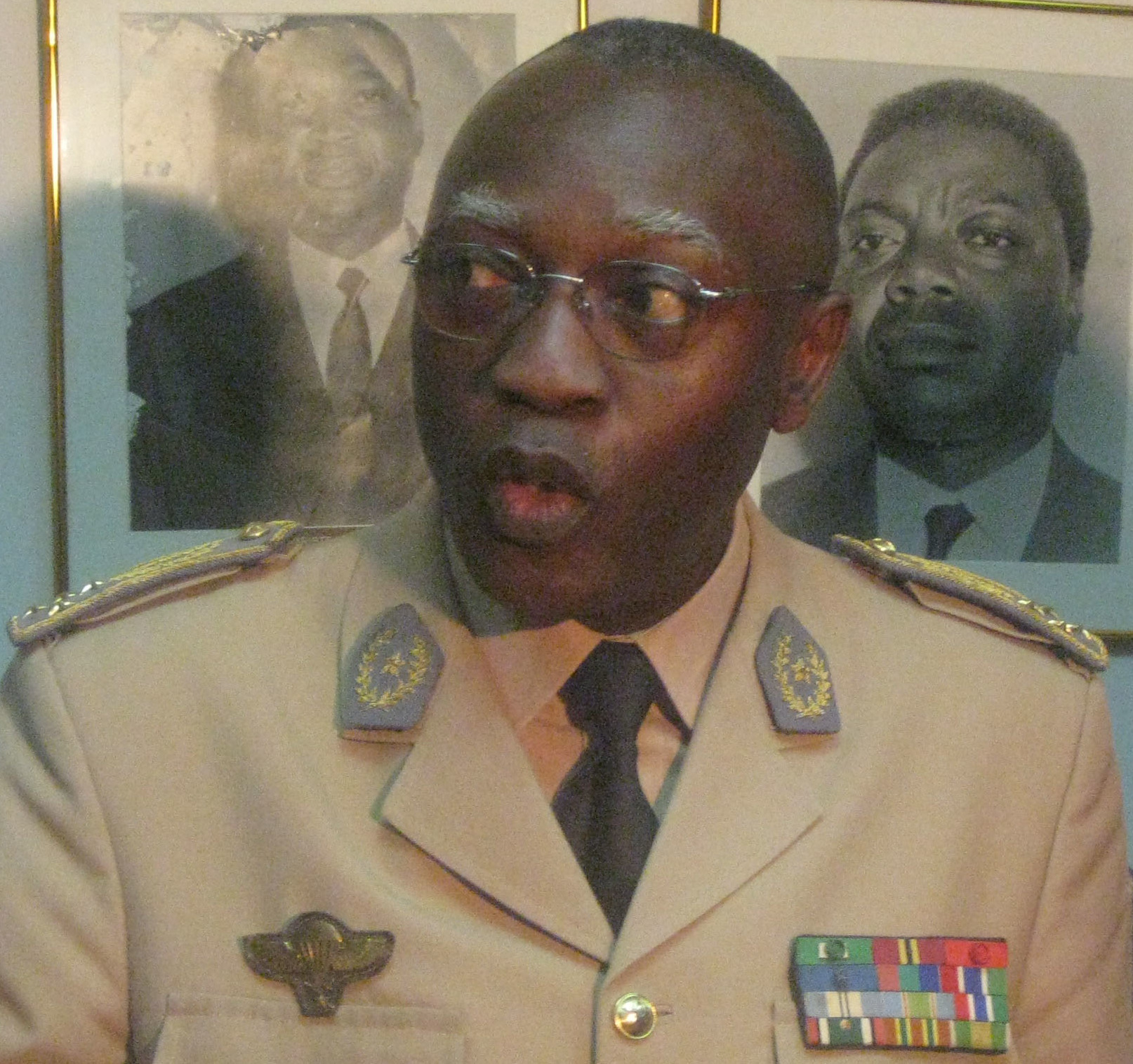
- General Gaye in 2009
- Born: January 31, 1951 (age 75); Saint-Louis, French Senegal
- Military career
- Allegiance: Senegal
- Branch: Senegalese Army
- Service years: 1972–
- Rank: Lieutenant General
- Commands: United Nations Mission in the Democratic Republic of the Congo
- Conflicts: Gulf War
- Awards: United Nations Medal

Babacar Gaye (born 31 January 1951) is a Senegalese Army General who formerly led the United Nations MINUSCA peacekeeping mission in the Central African Republic from July 2014 to August 2015, when he was dismissed for alleged abuses committed by troops under his command. Gaye previously the led UN peacekeeping mission in the Democratic Republic of the Congo, led Senegalese troops in the Gulf War, served as the head of Senegalese external intelligence, and served as the Senegalese ambassador to Germany.

== Education ==
Babacar Gaye attended military courses at war colleges and military schools in France and Belgium, including the École spéciale militaire de Saint-Cyr in France (1970-1972). He joined the École Supérieure de Guerre in Paris in 1986 and graduated in 1988.

== Career ==
From July 1974 to February 1975, Gaye served in the United Nations Emergency Force (UNEF), deployed to the Sinai in Egypt to supervise the ceasefire after the Yom Kippur War. Gaye then served as the commander of the Senegalese contingent in the United Nations Interim Force in Lebanon (UNIFIL) from August 1979 to March 1980.

In 1991, he served as commander of the Senegalese contingent in Operation Desert Storm, based in Dhahran, Saudi Arabia.

From 1993 to 1994, Gaye served as Director of Information and Public Relations for the Government of Senegal. From 1994 to 1997, he served as the Director of the Senegalese foreign intelligence agency, also known as the Directorate of Documentation and External Security.

By this point, Gaye had led an extensive and distinguished military career, having served, among other positions, as Chief of Military Region from November 1997 to May 2000.

Babacar Gaye was promoted to the rank of Brigade General in 2000, when he became Chef d'état-major général des armées (Chief of the Defence Staff) from May 2000 to August 2003. He was promoted to Divisional General (equivalent to Major General) in 2002.

In January 2004, Gaye was assigned as Ambassador of Senegal in Germany by president Abdoulaye Wade, with extended accreditation to Austria. During the same time period, he also served as Ambassador to the OPEP and United Nations Office at Vienna.

On 10 March 2005, the United Nations Secretary-General, Kofi Annan, appointed Lieutenant-General Babacar Gaye (Senegal) as the new Force Commander of the United Nations Organization Mission in the Democratic Republic of the Congo (MONUC), replacing Major-General Samaila Iliya of Nigeria. He was the third Force Commander of MONUC and the second commander from Senegal after General Mountaga Diallo. In 2010, he was succeeded by India's Chander Prakash.

In August 2010, he was appointed by United Nations Secretary-General Ban Ki-moon as Assistant Secretary-General and Military Advisor for Peacekeeping Operations at the Headquarters of the United Nations in New York City, replacing Lieutenant General Chikadibia Isaac Obiakor of Nigeria.

On 12 June 2013, Gaye was appointed as UN Secretary General Ban Ki-moon's Special Representative and Head of the United Nations Integrated Peacebuilding Office for the Central African Republic (BINUCA) in Bangui, CAR. He succeeded Margaret Vogt, a Nigerian diplomat.

From 16 July 2014, Gaye served as the United Nations Secretary-General's Special Representative and Head of the United Nations Multidimensional Integrated Stabilization Mission in the Central African Republic (MINUSCA). In August 2015, Gaye was sacked from his role as head of the peacekeeping mission in the Central African Republic, after multiple sex abuse allegations against peacekeeping troops, and other issues, including a report by Amnesty International that alleged Gaye's peacekeepers shot dead a 16-year-old boy and raped a 12-year-old girl in two separate incidents on 2 and 3 August.

== Awards ==
- United Nations Medal (MONUC - DRC)
- United Nations Medal (UNIFIL - Lebanon)

== Personal life ==
General Gaye is the son of former Secretary General of the OIC and Foreign Minister of Senegal Amadou Karim Gaye. He is married with two children.

Diplomatic posts
Preceded by Samaila Iliya	Force Commander of MONUSCO; 2005 – 2010	Succeeded by Chander Prakash
