= Otávio Rodrigues de Miranda Filho =

Brazilian Army general (1964–2026)

- Miranda Filho as MONUSCO Force Commander
- Born: 2 April 1964; Teresina, Piauí, Brazil
- Died: 21 May 2026 (aged 62)
- Military career
- Allegiance: Brazil
- Branch: Brazilian Army
- Service years: 1981–2025 (44 years)
- Rank: Divisional general (general de divisão); Lieutenant general (United Nations)
- Nickname: General Miranda Filho
- Commands: 3rd Army Police Battalion; 9th Motorized Infantry Brigade; 8th Military Region; MONUSCO Force
- Conflicts: 2018 federal intervention in Rio de Janeiro; Kivu conflict
- Awards: Order of Military Merit (Grand Officer); Order of Naval Merit (Grand Officer); Order of Rio Branco (Grand Officer); Order of Defence Merit (Commander)

Otávio Rodrigues de Miranda Filho (2 April 1964 – 21 May 2026), known as General Miranda Filho, was a Brazilian Army divisional general. He was Force Commander of the United Nations Organization Stabilization Mission in the Democratic Republic of the Congo (MONUSCO) in 2023 and 2024, the fifth Brazilian general officer to hold the post. In Brazil he was aide-de-camp to President Luiz Inácio Lula da Silva from 2007 to 2010, commanded the 9th Motorized Infantry Brigade during the 2018 federal intervention in Rio de Janeiro and the 8th Military Region in Belém, and was deputy commander of the Army's Land Operations Command.

== Early life and education ==
Miranda Filho was born in Teresina, Piauí, on 2 April 1964. He joined the Army at the age of 17 through the Army Cadet Preparatory School in Campinas. He graduated from the Agulhas Negras Military Academy in 1988 as an infantry officer with a bachelor's degree in military sciences.

During his career he qualified as a paratrooper and completed the airmobile and jungle operations courses, and he served in six of the Army's eight Military Area Commands, including about five years in the Amazon. He completed the Jungle Operations Course at the Jungle Warfare Training Center (CIGS) in Manaus in September 1998, as a captain. He also attended the Army Command and General Staff College in Rio de Janeiro. He spoke Portuguese, English and Spanish, and was proficient in French.

== Career ==
=== Sudan and the Presidency ===
Miranda Filho (right) in Sudan during his service with the United Nations mission, 2005–2006

In 2005, as a major, he was serving at the headquarters of the 11th Armoured Infantry Brigade in Campinas, which had been converted in November 2004 into the 11th Light Infantry Brigade (Law and Order). In March of that year he was assigned to the United Nations Stabilisation Mission in Haiti; the assignment was revoked the following month, and in April he was assigned as a military observer to the United Nations Mission in Sudan (UNMIS). He served in Sudan from May 2005 to June 2006. By his own account, he spent three months as a military observer and nine months on the Force Commander's staff, working in intelligence.

With President Luiz Inácio Lula da Silva, whose aide-de-camp he was from 2007 to 2010

On his return to Brazil he was appointed an officer of the Army Commander's Cabinet and served in the Army Intelligence Center, in its international area. In March 2007 he was appointed aide-de-camp to the President, in the aides-de-camp office (Ajudância de Ordens) of the President's Personal Cabinet, where he remained until 31 December 2010, throughout the second term of Luiz Inácio Lula da Silva. In 2009, by then a lieutenant colonel, he was admitted to the Order of Rio Branco in the rank of Officer, as aide-de-camp to the President.

=== Battalion command and attaché in China ===
Appointed commander of the 3rd Army Police Battalion in Porto Alegre in July 2010, he held the command until June 2012, by which time he was a colonel. After a posting to the Army General Staff, he was appointed Army attaché at the Brazilian embassy in China in August 2013, and held the post from July 2014 to July 2016.

From 2016 to 2018 he served at the Planalto Military Command in Brasília, where he was chief of staff.

=== 9th Motorized Infantry Brigade ===
Speaking at the brigade's change-of-command ceremony, 13 April 2018

Promoted to brigadier general on 31 March 2018, he was appointed commander of the School Units Group/9th Motorized Infantry Brigade (Grupamento de Unidades-Escola/9.ª Brigada de Infantaria Motorizada) in Rio de Janeiro, a post he held until the end of 2019. His command coincided with the federal intervention in the state's public security, from February to December 2018, during which the brigade was employed in law-and-order operations (garantia da lei e da ordem). Miranda Filho said he had personally commanded 57 operations; the newspaper Diário do Rio reported 117 operations against organized crime under his command. He told UN News that he required at least two women in every patrol in the city's communities, to make contact with residents easier.

During the intervention, Captain Diego Martins Graça of the 1st Motorized Infantry Battalion (School), a unit of the brigade, was shot on 15 September 2018 in an operation in the Complexo da Penha and died on 7 October. He was the first officer wounded in combat since the start of the intervention.

On 7 April 2019, after the intervention had ended, a patrol of the same battalion, led by a lieutenant, came upon a robbery on the Estrada do Camboatá in Guadalupe and fired on the car of the musician Evaldo Rosa dos Santos, which, according to the Civil Police, the soldiers mistook for the robbers' vehicle; Evaldo and the waste picker Luciano Macedo were killed. The patrol was acting in an operation ordered by the command of the 1st Army Division, and General Miranda Filho was heard as a witness in the military court proceedings.

=== Army General Staff and 8th Military Region ===
With Maj. Gen. Daniel Walrath of U.S. Army South (left) at the Brazil–United States staff talks, 23 October 2020

In November 2019 he was appointed 5th Deputy Chief of the Army General Staff, responsible for the Army's international relations. In that role he led the Brazilian delegation to the Brazil–United States army-to-army staff talks in October 2020, which agreed joint exercises for 2021. From July 2020 to July 2021 he was also a member of the Army's Officer Promotions Board.

Promoted to divisional general on 31 July 2021, he took command of the 8th Military Region in Belém, which he handed over on 12 January 2023.

=== MONUSCO Force Commander ===
Greeting peacekeepers in Goma on the International Day of UN Peacekeepers, 29 May 2023

Nominated by the Brazilian Army as a candidate for the post, Miranda Filho was appointed Force Commander of MONUSCO by UN Secretary-General António Guterres on 4 January 2023, succeeding fellow Brazilian Marcos de Sá Affonso da Costa. He held the United Nations rank of lieutenant general in the mission. He arrived in Kinshasa on 20 March 2023.

On 28 July 2023 he briefed the United Nations Security Council in a debate on the protection of civilians, reporting more than a hundred armed groups and 6.3 million internally displaced people in the country. He described a visit to a base beside a camp of more than 70,000 displaced people who, he said, "lack everything". He also asked troop-contributing countries to send more women peacekeepers.

With officers and peacekeepers at a mortar position in the Goma–Sake area, North Kivu

On 3 November 2023, in Goma, he announced Operation Springbok, conducted by MONUSCO with the Armed Forces of the Democratic Republic of the Congo to protect Goma and Sake from the advance of the March 23 Movement (M23). Days later he told journalists that the mission's soldiers were outside their bases "because they are ready to die if necessary to protect the population". In the same period he told the Brazilian television news programme Jornal da Record: "Here I am not Miranda Filho. Here I am Brazil. I cannot fail." (Note: In the original Portuguese: "Aqui eu não sou o Miranda Filho. Aqui eu sou o Brasil. Eu não posso falhar.")

His command coincided with preparations for the mission's withdrawal, requested by the Congolese government: in December 2023 the Security Council approved a phased disengagement plan. In an interview with the newspaper O Estado de S. Paulo, he said the conditions for the mission's exit were unlikely to be fully met by December 2024. At the end of December 2023, after the Congolese general election, he was in Bunia, in Ituri Province, to discuss the following year's operations with the military governor.

In 2024 the Senegalese general Khar Diouf became acting Force Commander. A farewell ceremony for Miranda Filho was held in Goma in June 2024, attended by the head of the mission, Bintou Keita, and representatives of the Congolese armed forces; his assignment to the mission officially ended on 30 June. His permanent successor, the Brazilian general Ulisses de Mesquita Gomes, was appointed in January 2025.

=== Land Operations Command ===
From 12 July 2024 to 24 November 2025 he was deputy commander of the Army's Land Operations Command (COTER) in Brasília. In June 2025 he represented the Army at an international key leader seminar on gender in military operations, in Sweden. He was transferred to the reserve on 25 November 2025.

== Death and tributes ==
The municipal school named after him in Inhoaíba, Rio de Janeiro

Bust unveiled at the 9th Motorized Infantry Brigade in November 2026

Miranda Filho died on 21 May 2026, aged 62, from complications caused by a brain tumour. His death was announced by COTER.

President Lula said he had worked closely with Miranda Filho in the aides-de-camp office and called him "a special human being and an exemplary soldier". The spokesperson for the UN Secretary-General expressed sorrow at his death and highlighted his commitment to the protection of civilians. The UN Under-Secretary-General for Peace Operations, Jean-Pierre Lacroix, recalled his "remarkable service in the DRC for peace & stability", and the former justice minister Tarso Genro praised his commitment to the country's constitution.

On 2 August 2026 the city of Rio de Janeiro opened a municipal school named after him, the Ginásio Educacional Tecnológico General Miranda Filho, in Inhoaíba; the ceremony was attended by his wife, Adriana Costa Miranda, his son, Otávio Costa Miranda, and his grandson, Oscar Lacs Miranda, and by a United Nations representative, who presented the school with a UN flag. On 12 November 2026, on the 81st anniversary of the 9th Motorized Infantry Brigade, the unit's historic parade ground in Realengo was named Pátio General Miranda Filho and a bust of him was unveiled there.

== Honours ==
- Order of Military Merit: Knight (2011), Officer (2015), Commander (2018) and Grand Officer (2021)
- Order of Naval Merit: Commander (2018) and Grand Officer (2022)
- Order of Rio Branco: Officer (2009) and Grand Officer (2025)
- Order of Defence Merit: Knight (2008) and Commander (2021)
- Victory Medal (2009)
- Military Medal in gold with platinum clasp, for 40 years of service (2022)
- Marshal Trompowsky Medal, with bronze clasp (2025)
- Airborne Merit Medal, with bronze clasp (2025)
