= Micheline Ombae =

Congolese politician

Micheline Ombae Kalama
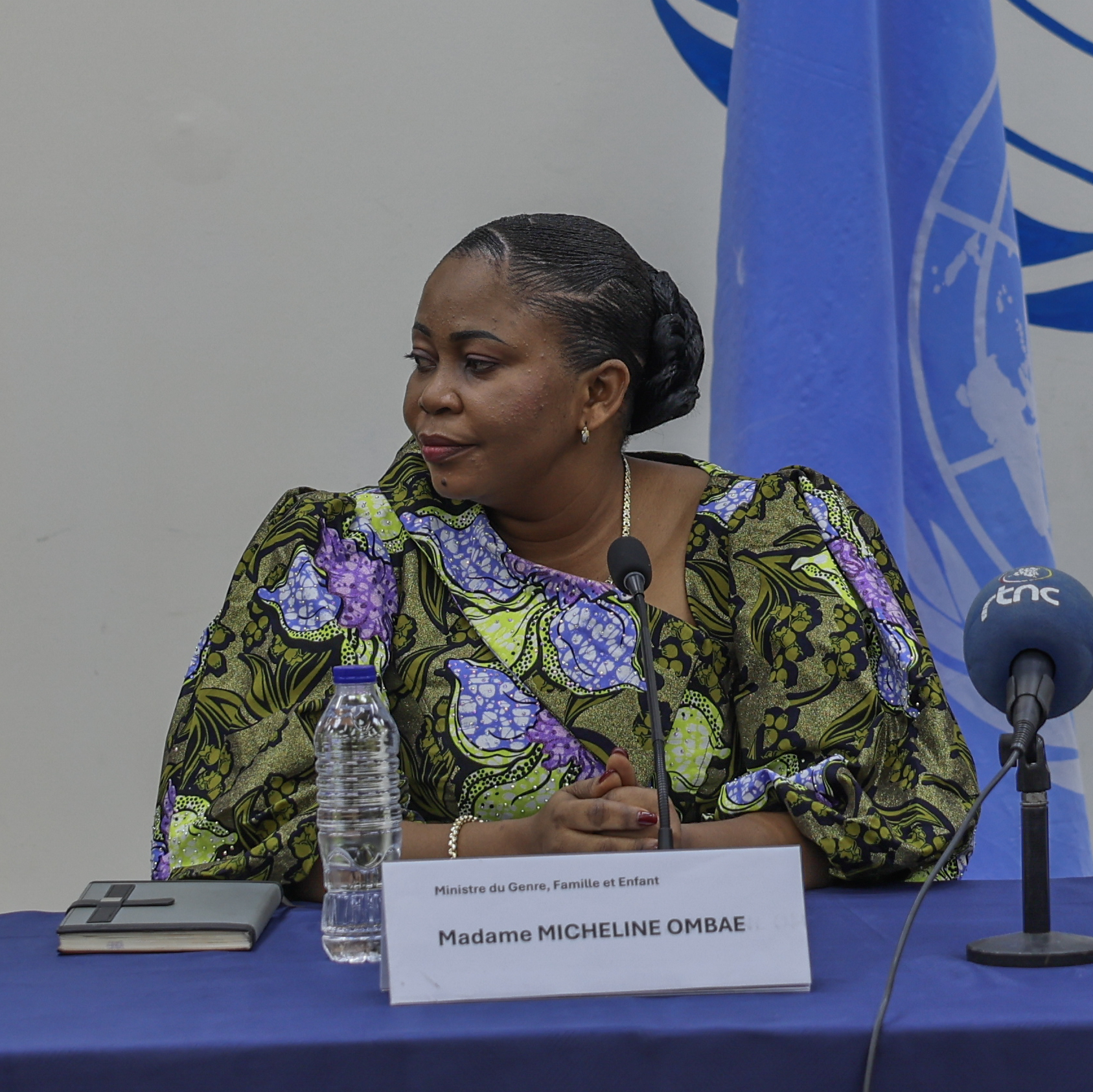
- in 2025
- Born: August 23, 1984 (age 41); Isiro
- Education: Saint Kizito Institute
- Employer: World Food Programme
- Known for: Minister for Gender

Micheline Ombae Kalama (born August 23, 1984) is a Congolese politician and from August 2025 the Minister for Gender, Family and Children.

== Life ==
Kalama was born in 1984 in Rungu / Isiro. She was educated there including a degree in finance from Isiro's Saint Kizito Institute.

She got involved with women's rights in 2021 and in 2025 she took the lead at the Nothing Without Women Movement. She has worked for the World Food Programme.

In August 2025 she became the Minister for Gender in what was called the Suminwa II government. It was created by decree by President Félix Tshisekedi. She was supported as the new minister by the Congolese businessperson Gentiny Ngobila and Jean Bakomito who is the Governor of Haut-Uélé. She credited the President and the Prime Minister Judith Suminwa Tuluka for her selection.

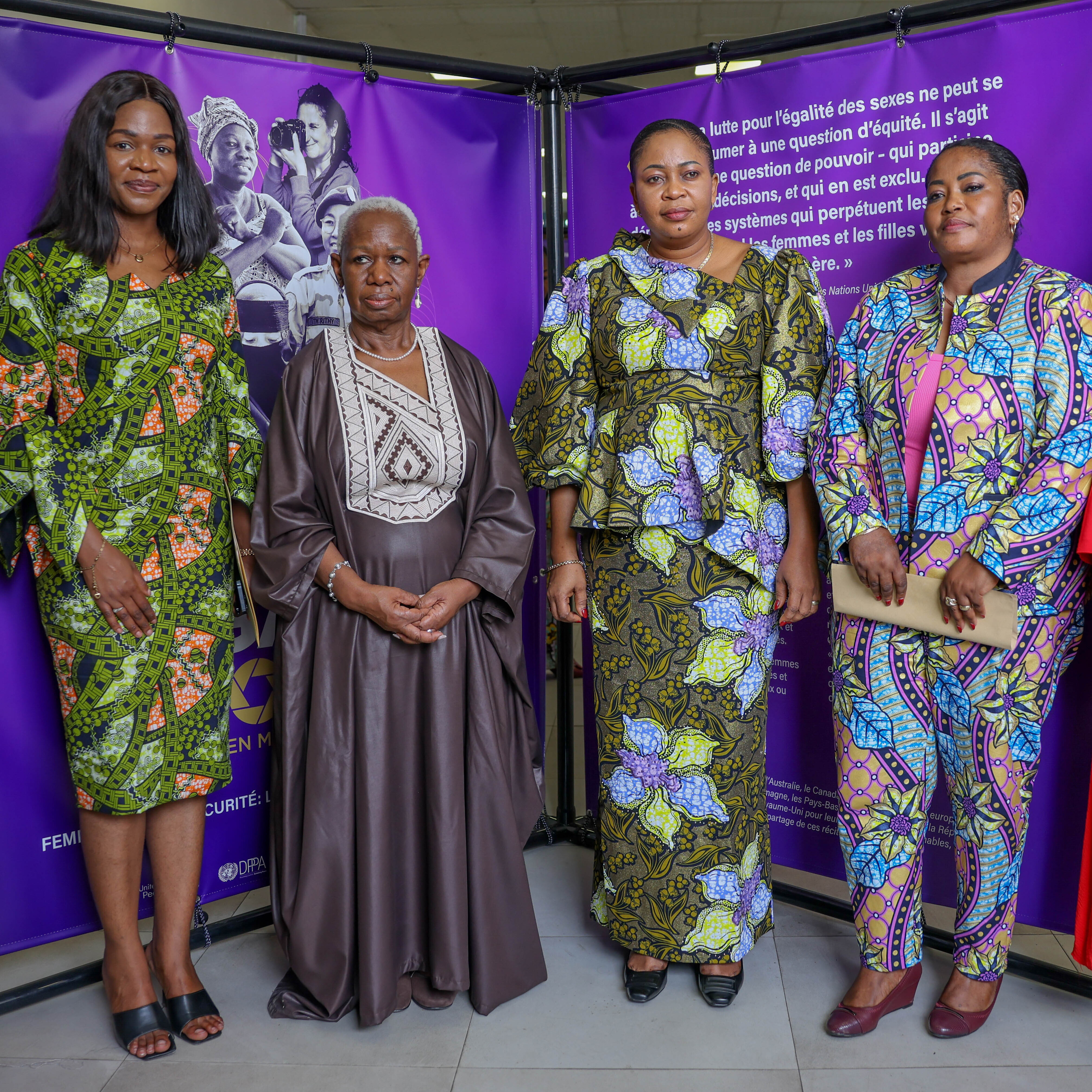
left to right:Do Nsoseme, Bintou Keita, Micheline Ombae and Nelly Mbangu at Crossed Perspectives Women Marching for Peace exhibition by Nsoseme

Nelly Mbangu and Bintou Keita attended when she opened an exhibition in Kinshasa in September 2025. It was created by Do Nsoseme and titled "Cross-perspectives: Congolese women in the spotlight" and it was an international exhibition for peace as there was a similar mirroring exhibition in New York. The exhibition's supporters included Keita's MONUSCO, UN Women and the United Nations Department of Peace Operations.
