= Nelly Mbangu =

Congolese women's and children's rights activist

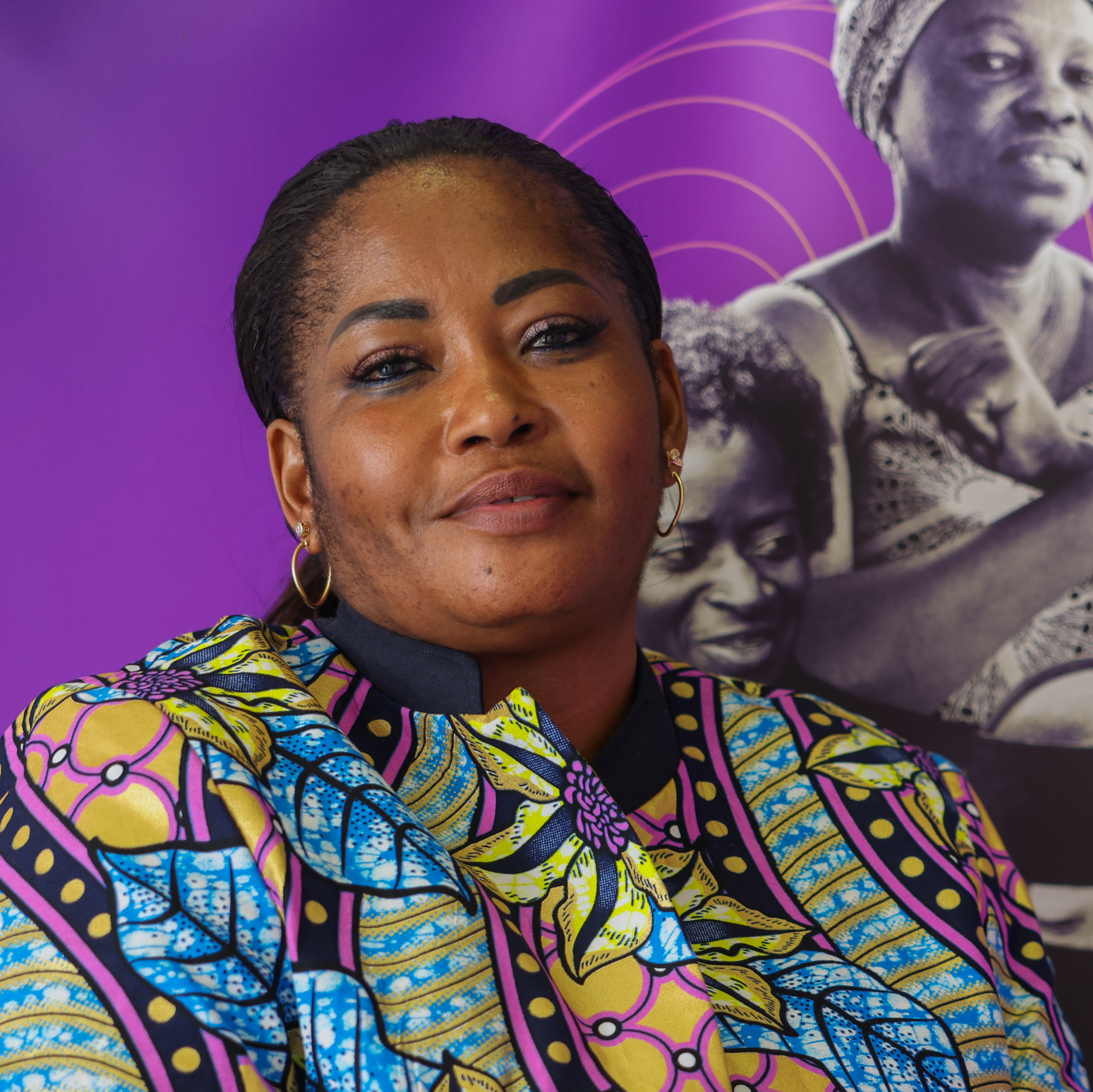
- Nelly Mbangu in 2025
- Known for: Women's and children's rights campaigns

Nelly Mbangu is a Congolese women's and children's rights campaigner. She co-founded a movement to bring together 30 organisations with similar aims under title Sauti ya Mama Mukongomani (Voice of Congolese Women). She is a woman human rights defender and the coordinator of the Help and Action for Piece - Aide et Action pour la Paix (AAP). Additionally Help and Action for Piece - Aide et Action pour la Paix (AAP) works on good governance topics and resolution of land rights disputes.

== Career ==
Nelly Mbangu campaigns for the rights of women and children in North Kivu, Democratic Republic of Congo. One of her main aims is to teach children that women can have important roles beyond the kitchen. In 2000 Mbangu welcomed the implementation of UN Security Council Resolution 1325 which increased the involvement of women in UN peace and security missions; she had seen at first hand how blockages in access to services had impacted on women in refugee camps.

Mbangu is a co-founder and president of the Dynamique des femmes jurists (DFJ) a non-governmental organisation that works to raise awareness of women's rights issues in Eastern Congo. DFJ seeks to provide legal advice to women and to improve their access to justice. DFJ also provides financial aid, psychological care and social services to survivors of sexual and domestic violence.

Mbangu was a director for the Democracy Research Center, an organisation led jointly by Development Alternatives Incorporated, USAID and the Goma Refugee Camp, from 2006 to 2008. She was a project manager for HelpAge International from October 2009 to 31 March 2011. From August 2012 to January 2017 Mbangu was a coordinator for Aide et Action pour la Paix (AAP), an organisation seeking to improve women's and children's rights, promote good governance, resolve land disputes and provide protection of the environment and natural resource. Mbangu sits on the AAP Africa steering committee.

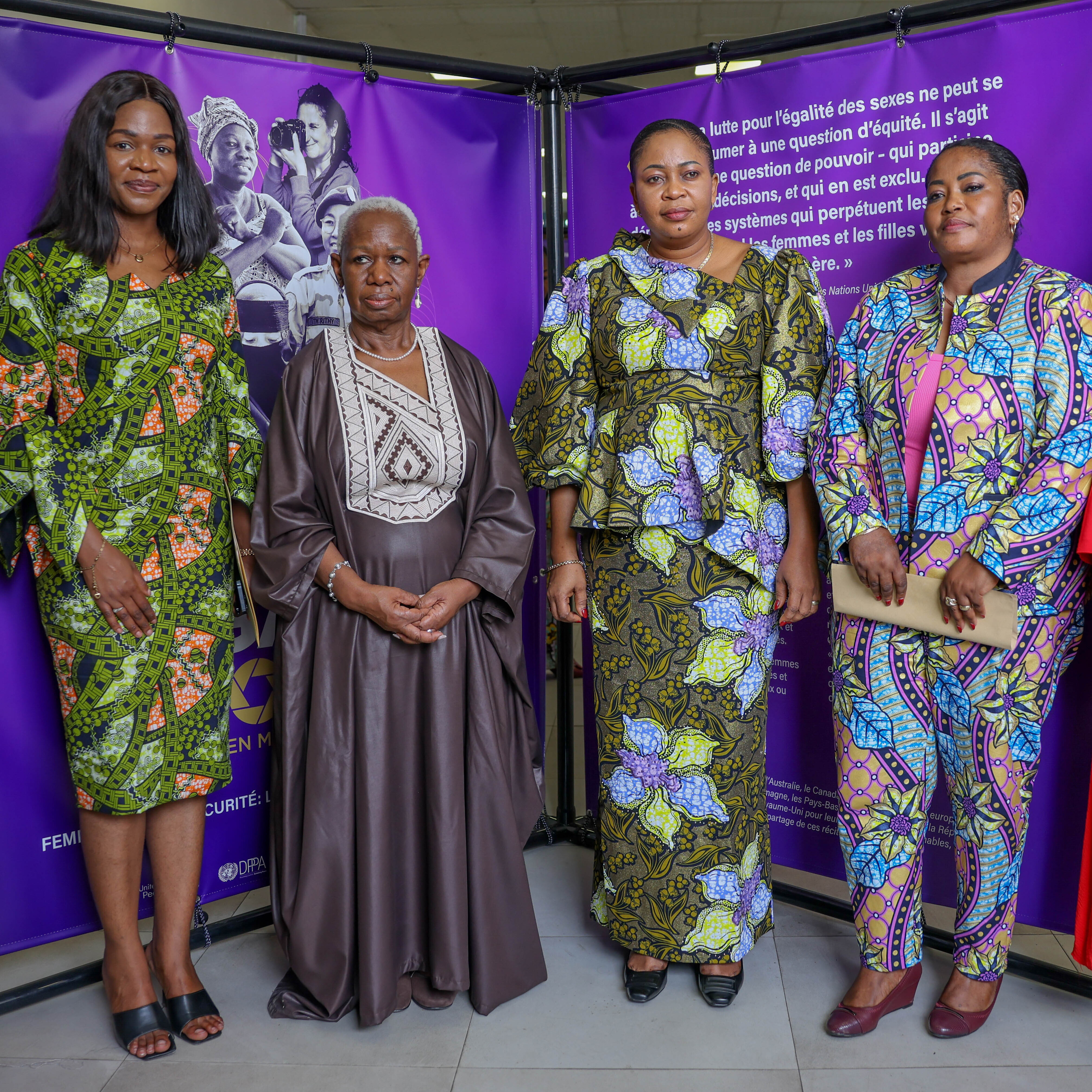
left to right:Do Nsoseme, Bintou Keita, Micheline Ombae and Nelly Mbangu at Crossed Perspectives Women Marching for Peace exhibition by Nsoseme

Mbangu also helped to set-up Sauti ya Mama Mukongomani (Voice of Congolese Women), a "women's movement for peace and security" that brings together 30 of the leading women's organisations in the Congo. Since February 2017 she has been a program officer for the Fonds pour les Femmes Congolaises.

In 2021 she made an appearance with Bintou Keita at the UN Security Council as the Coordinator of Sauti y'a Mama Mukongomani. They attended virtually as the council discussed MONUSCO and the situation in the Democratic Republic of Congo.

Mbangu and Bintou Keita attended when Micheline Ombae who was the Minister for Gender opened an exhibition in Kinshasa in September 2025. It was titled "Cross-perspectives: Congolese women in the spotlight" and it was an international exhibition for peace as there was a similar exhibition in New York.

In December 2025, she was awarded the Franco-German Prize for Human Rights and the Rule of Law.
