= Mountaga =

Mountaga is a masculine given name. Notable people with the name include:

- Mountaga Diallo (1942–2017), Senegalese diplomat
- Mountaga Tall (born 1956), Malian politician
