= Chander Prakash =

Chander Prakash may refer to:

- Chander Prakash (general), Indian Army general
- Chander Prakash (politician), Indian politician from Jammu and Kashmir

== See also ==
- Chander Parkash, Indian politician from Haryana
