= Dynamique des femmes jurists =

Dynamique des femmes jurists is a women's organisation in the Democratic Republic of the Congo. It was co-founded in 2006 by Nelly Mbangu, director of the Democracy Research Center, who went on to become the first president of the organisation.

== Background ==
At the start of the 21st century the Democratic Republic of the Congo was suffering civil war with rebels fighting against government troops. In 2003 a peace accord was negotiated and in 2006 elections were held. However years of instability had resulted in much violence in the eastern part of the country which was described as the "rape capital of the world".

== Objectives ==
Dynamique des femmes jurists was set up to provide gender equality for women. The organisation aims to empower women so that they know what their rights are and are confident in obtaining them. These rights include the right to live unmolested, to have security of land tenure, to have access to basic social services, and to have access to the courts and tribunals. The organisation aims to encourage women to take up the law as a profession and then to represent other women who need their services, also to join trade unions, to participate in politics and to join in decision-making bodies in both the public and private sectors. The organisation also offers psychological help to survivors of rape and female genital mutilation.
