= Ulisses Gomes =

Brazilian military officer

Lieutenant General Ulisses de Mesquita Gomes is a Brazilian army officer currently serving as Force Commander of the United Nations Organization Stabilization Mission in the Democratic Republic of the Congo (MONUSCO) since 2025.

== Education ==
Gomes earned a bachelor's degree in law from Federal University, Brazil and a master's degree in Military Science and Law from Brazilian Army Staff College.

== Military career ==
He was Chief of Planning and Operations of the 11th Infantry Brigade and served as the Defence Adviser of Strategic Affairs of the Brazilian Government and Commander of 7th Infantry Brigade.

Gomes foreign operations includes his deployment with the United Nations Stabilization Mission in Haiti (MINUSTAH) from 2008 to 2009 and served as the Chief of the Current Military Operations Service and Policy & Doctrine Team in the Office of Military Affairs of the UN Department of Peace Operations from 2017 to 019. He was appointed as Force Commander of the United Nations Organization Stabilization Mission in the Democratic Republic of the Congo (MONUSCO) by the United Nations Secretary-General António Guterres in 2025 succeeding Major General Khar Diouf of Senegal.
