= Germany–Senegal relations =

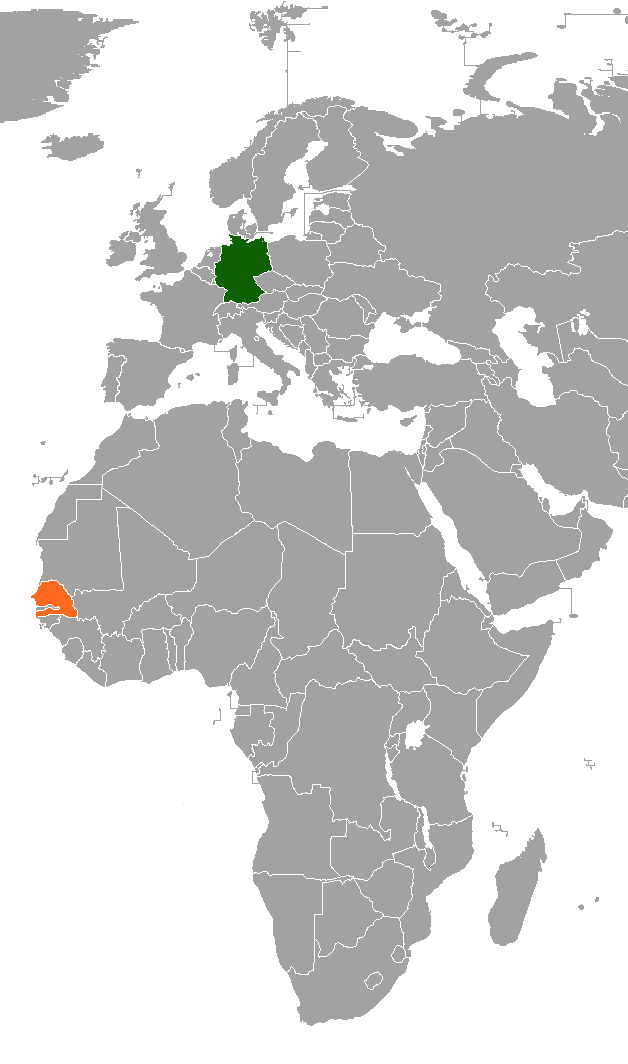

- Germany: Senegal

Germany–Senegal relations are the bilateral relations between Germany and Senegal. The relations are described by the German Foreign Office as "friendly." The two countries share a close partnership in development cooperation, and numerous cultural ties exist between the two countries.

== History ==
Senegal first became known in the German speaking world through the travelogue Reise nach Senegal by the French botanist Michel Adanson, published in German in 1773. As part of the French Colonial Empire, soldiers from Senegal fought in First (1914-1918) and Second World War (1939-1945) against Germany. In June 1940, members of the SS Totenkopf Division and other units murdered 188 Senegalese soldiers in France. Léopold Sédar Senghor was also captured and narrowly escaped being shot. In 1950, Senghor befriended the German writer Janheinz Jahn, whose publications decisively changed and modernized the (West German) image of Africa. Senghor became the first president of independent Senegal in 1960.

In 1955, the Federal Republic of Germany (FRG) established a consulate in Dakar in French West Africa, which was converted into an embassy five years later. The first ambassador of the FRG to Senegal was Walter Reichhold. In 1968, Senghor was awarded the Peace Prize of the German Book Trade as Senegalese president. In the process, the award ceremony in Frankfurt am Main was met with protests by left-wing activists who accused Senghor of being an "African ideologue of colonialism and neo-colonialism" because he pursued pro-Western policies. The conclusion of a cultural agreement in 1970 deepened cultural cooperation between the two countries, and three years later the Goethe-Institut expanded into Senegal. After the end of the Hallstein Doctrine under Chancellor Willy Brandt, Senegal also established diplomatic relations with the German Democratic Republic (GDR) in 1973. The following year, a Senegalese embassy was opened in Bonn, the capital of the FRG.

After German reunification, Senegal moved its embassy from Bonn to Berlin. In the 21st century, cultural and political relations continued to deepen, and in 2006 the Senegalese-German Business Association (SeDeWi) was founded following a visit to Germany by Senegalese President Abdoulaye Wade. In 2013, Senegalese-born Karamba Diaby was the first African-born politician to be elected to the German Bundestag. Former Bundestag member Charles M. Huber also has family roots in Senegal on his father's side and has had a house in Mbour since 2004, where he has also lived for a time. In August 2018, German Chancellor Angela Merkel visited the Republic of Senegal.

== Economic relations ==
Economic relations between the two countries are still poorly developed and, for Senegal, lag behind those with the former colonial power France and the People's Republic of China. The bilateral trade volume between the two countries was 213 million euros in 2021. Germany exports to Senegal mainly chemical and industrial products such as cars and machinery, and in return imports food and raw materials. An investment protection agreement was concluded between the two countries in 1967 and negotiations on a double taxation agreement began in 2018. All imports from Senegal to Germany are duty-free and quota-free, with the exception of armaments, as part of the Everything but Arms initiative of the European Union.

== Culture ==
German institutions present in Senegal include the five political foundations (Friedrich Ebert Foundation, Friedrich Naumann Foundation, Heinrich Böll Foundation, Konrad Adenauer Foundation, Rosa Luxemburg Foundation), the Goethe Institute, the German Academic Exchange Service (DAAD), the Gesellschaft für Internationale Zusammenarbeit (GIZ), the Kreditanstalt für Wiederaufbau (KfW) and an advisory group of the Bundeswehr. There are many contacts and partnerships between cities, schools and parishes or dioceses. Projects exist in the fields of music, photography, visual arts and modern dance. There is also cooperation between the two countries in research and higher education.

Since 1973, there has been an institute of German studies at the University of Dakar, and in 2002, Dr. Ibrahima El Hadj Diop was habilitated at the University of Duisburg-Essen, becoming the first Germanist in the country. In Senegalese schools, German is the fourth most popular foreign language and in 2010, 17,588 people in Senegal were learning German.

The two countries also have close ties in sports. The Germans Otto Pfister (1979-1982) and Peter Schnittger (1999-2000) were national coaches of the Senegalese national football team. Senegalese footballers such as Papiss Demba Cissé, Demba Ba, Mame Diouf, Lamine Sané, Souleymane Sané, Bouna Sarr and Sadio Mané were active in Germany. Leroy Sané, son of Souleymane Sané, became an international for Germany.

== Development cooperation ==
Germany is an important donor country for Senegal in development aid. Since the country's independence until about 2022, Germany has provided nearly 900 million euros in development aid. The partnership focuses on energy, education, and job creation.

== Diplomatic locations ==
- Germany has an embassy in Dakar.
- Senegal has an embassy in Berlin.
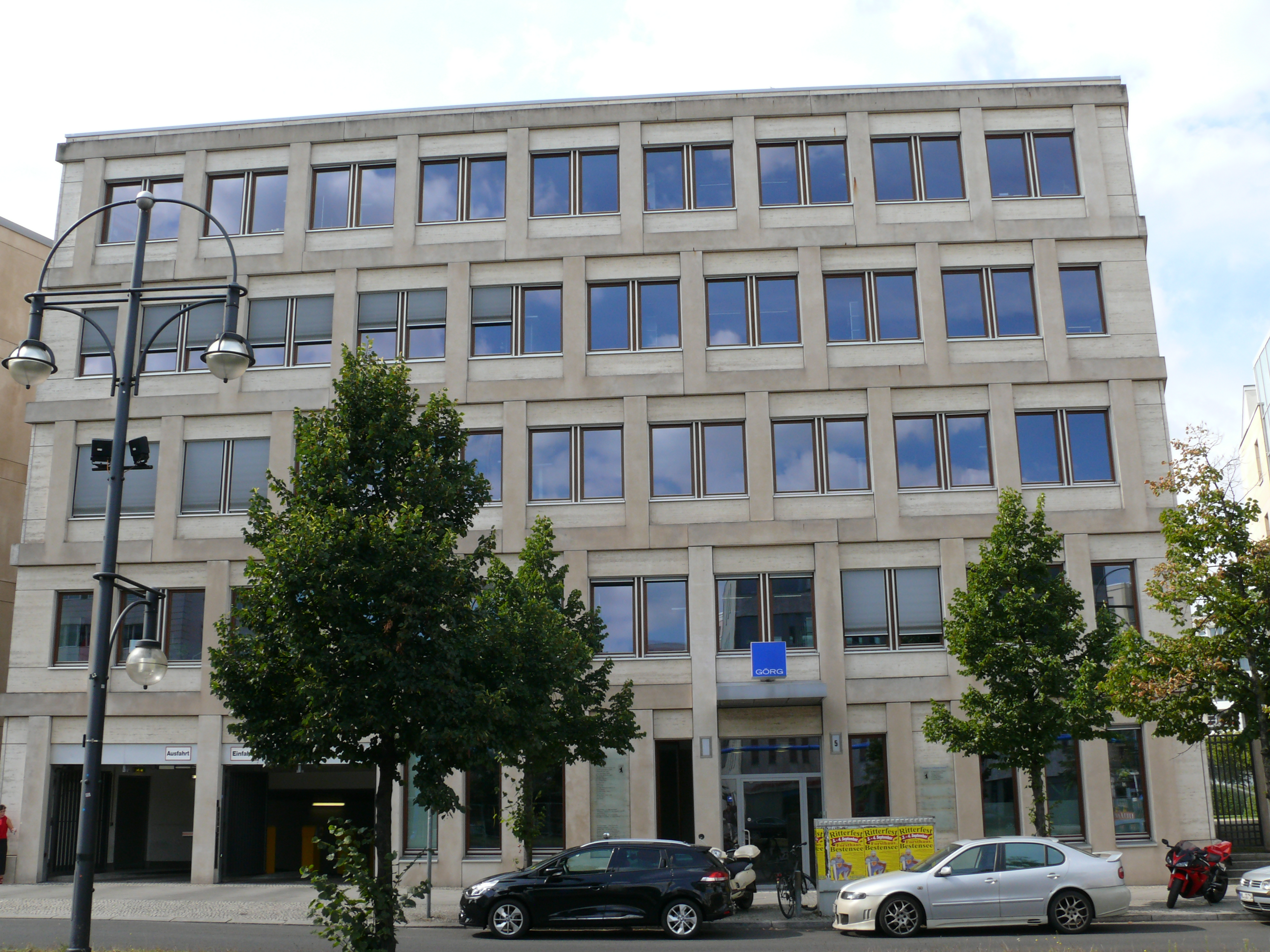
Senegalese embassy in Berlin.
