= Bintou Keita =

Guinean diplomat and UN official

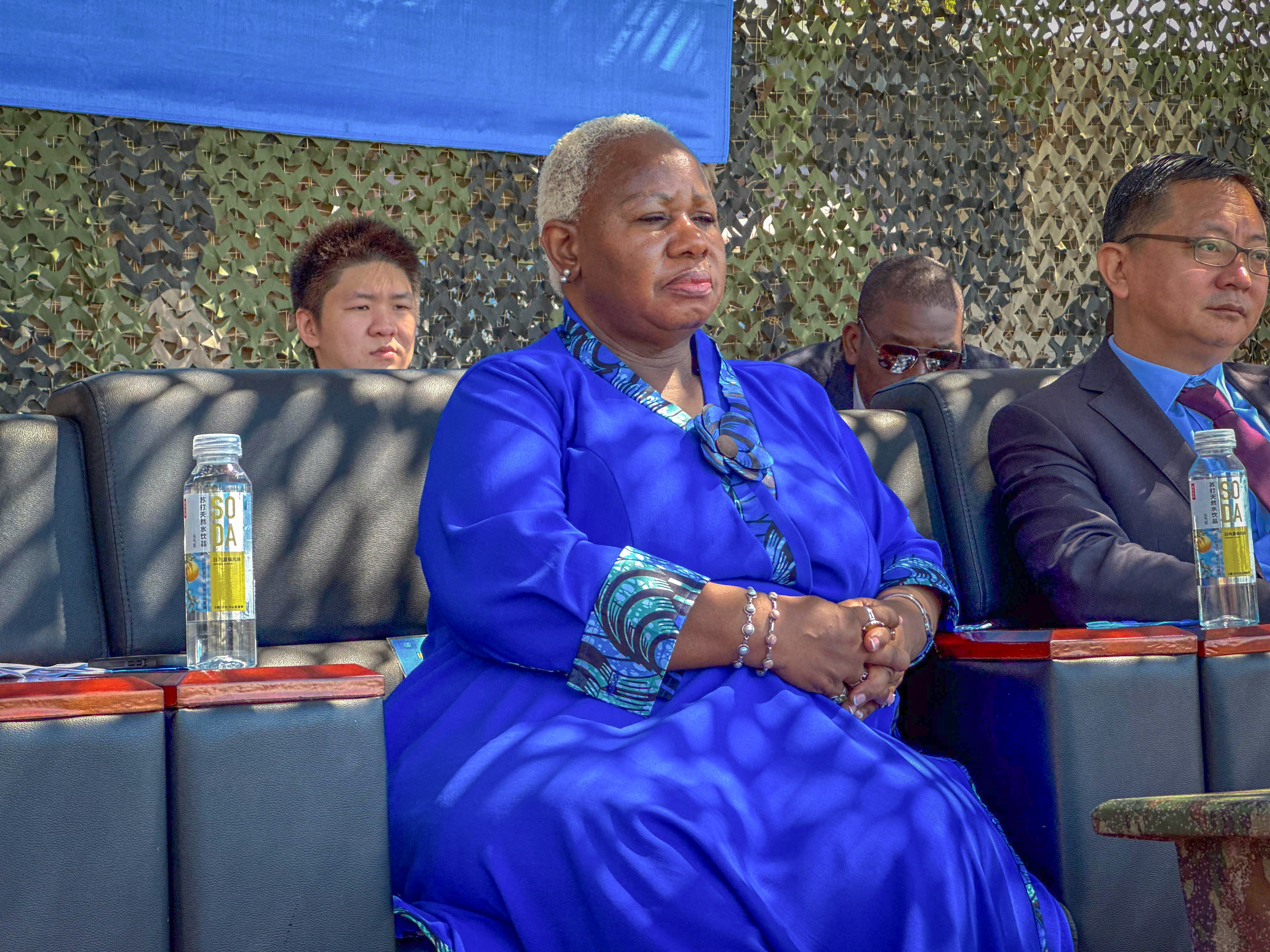
- Keita in 2024
- Born: 1958 (age 67–68); Guinea
- Education: Paris Dauphine University
- Employer: United Nations
- Known for: UN Secretary-General's Special Representative in the Democratic Republic of the Congo

Bintou Keita (born 1958) is a Guinean United Nations diplomat. She is an expert in conflict resolution, and has been the Special Representative of the Secretary-General in the Democratic Republic of the Congo since January 2021.

== Early life and education ==
Keita was born in Guinea in 1958. Her education included a degree in Social Economy from the University of Paris. She went to the Paris Dauphine University to obtain her master's degree in business administration and management.

== Career ==
She began working for the United Nations in 1989.

In 2018 she left her job as Deputy Joint Special Envoy for the African Union-United Nations Hybrid Operation in Darfur (UNAMID). Her old role was taken by Anita Kiki Gbeho.

In 2019, Keita became the Assistant Secretary-General for Africa. She gave an interview where she spoke about the advantages of increasing the number of women in the military. Her father was in the military and he had encouraged her to join. Now she observing the military engaged in Africa and she noted that there were situations where women or a mixed team could perform tasks that would nearly defeat a force made up only of men. At present women only make up 5% of uniformed personnel.

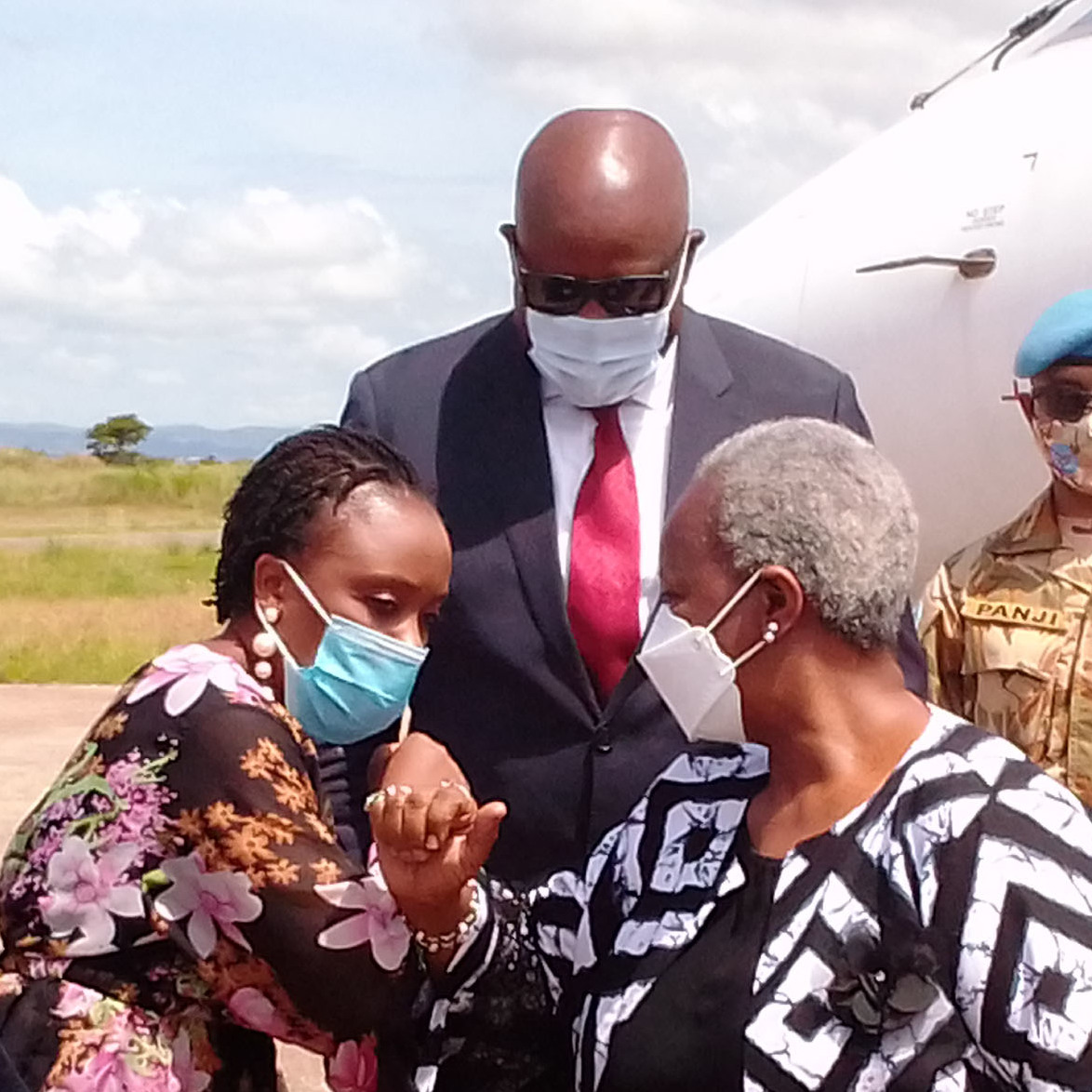
Keita (on the right) in Kalemie, 2021.

In January 2021, she was appointed to lead the United Nations Organization Stabilization Mission in the Democratic Republic of the Congo MONUSCO and to be the UN Secretary General's Special Representative in the Democratic Republic of the Congo. She succeeded the Algerian UN official Leila Zerrougui. In April she issued a statement to the press. While accepting that people had the right to criticise MONUSCO she felt that some of the points were unfair. She wrote that "relationship between the United Nations and the Democratic Republic of the Congo is of an intensity and complexity that I have rarely seen elsewhere."

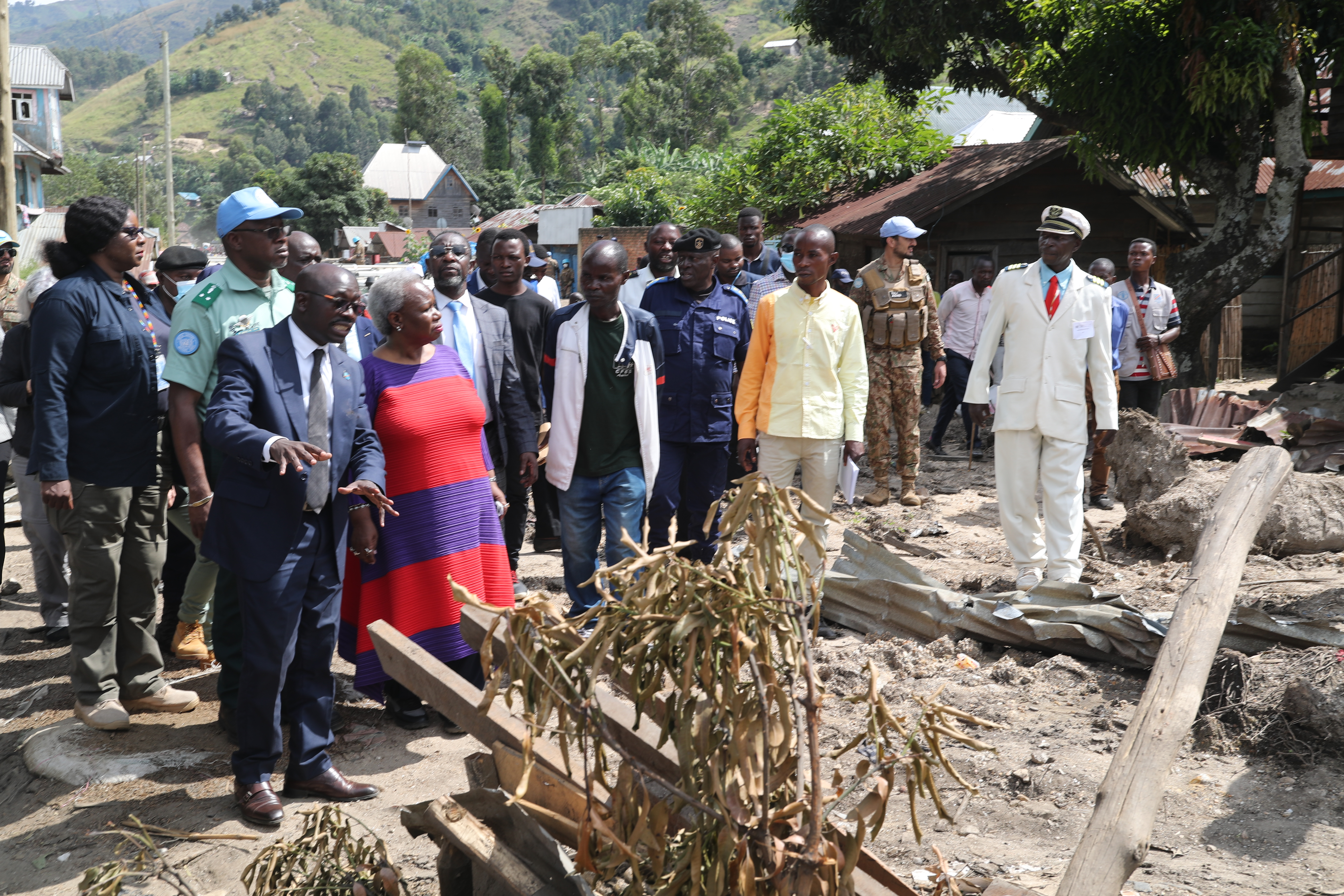
Bintou Keita seeing flood damage in 2023

In March 2023 she spoke to rally local support for the MONUSCO mission. 600,000 people had been effected by violence and MONUSCO was seen to be ineffective.

On 2 to 4 May 2023 there was flooding in the Kalehe Territory that destroyed 5,000 homes and killed about 400 people. The World Food Programme was aware that there were over 100,000 internally displaced people and 50,000 people were expected to need assistance. Keita visited the area that month seeing the survivors and the damaged area.

Nelly Mbangu and Keita attended when Micheline Ombae who was the new Minister for Gender opened an exhibition in Kinshasa in September 2025. It was titled "Cross-perspectives: Congolese women in the spotlight" and it was an international exhibition for peace as there was a similar exhibition in New York.
