= Marcos da Costa =

Lieutenant General Marcos de Sá Affonso da Costa is a Brazilian Army officer who served as the Force Commander of United Nations Organization Stabilization Mission in the Democratic Republic of the Congo (MONUSCO) from 2021 to 2023.

== Education ==
A native of Rio de Janeiro, da Costa earned a bachelor’s degree in military sciences from Agulhas Negras Military Academy in 1986 and a master’s degree in military operations from the Escola de Aperfeiçoamento de Oficiais (EsAO). He obtained his Doctorate degree in Military Sciences from the Escola de Comando e Estado-Maior do Exército (ECEME), the Army Command and General Staff College. He attended several courses including International Humanitarian Law (known as International Law of Armed Conflict) at Brazil's Escola Superior de Guerra (ESG), Policy, Strategy, and Higher Administration Course at the Centre des hautes études militaires (CHEM) in France and the Joint Command and Staff Course at the Escola Superior de Guerra du Perú.

== Career ==
He served as Chief of Training of Brazil Land Forces Training Command and coordinated bilateral and multinational readiness programs including the PANAMAX and JRTC combat simulation exercises alongside U.S. Army South to boost international interoperability. In 2021, United Nations Secretary-General António Guterres appointed da Costa Force Commander of (MONUSCO). During his time as Force Commander, he implemented community alert system in Ituri which protected civilians from massacre. In 2022, he briefed the United Nations Security Council on the importance of strategic communications in maximizing the efficiency of modern peacekeeping missions. He left the command on 28 February 2023.
