= Margaret Vogt =

Nigerian diplomat

Margaret Aderinsola Vogt (May 26, 1950 – September 23, 2014), was a Nigerian diplomat and political scientist who served as Special Representative and Head of the United Nations Integrated Peace-building Office in the Central African Republic (BINUCA) until mid-2013. She was appointed to this position by the United Nations Secretary-General Ban Ki-moon on May 19, 2011.

== Biography ==
Vogt was born in Nigeria to a Nigerian father and a Lebanese mother. She obtained a Bachelor's from Barnard College in 1974, and a Master's degree in international affairs from Columbia University's School of International Public Affairs in 1977.

== Career ==
A veteran diplomat and scholar on Africa issues, Vogt held a number of high-ranking positions within the United Nations. Prior to her appointment with BINUCA, she was Deputy Director of the Africa I Division in the Department of Political Affairs at the United Nations Secretariat. She also worked as Acting Deputy Special Representative of the Secretary-General at the United Nations Political Office for Somalia.

Besides the United Nations, she collected extensive experience in various high-ranking posts. She worked as Director of the Office of the African Union Commission Chairperson in the African Union. She was also one of the key scholars in the conceptualization and facilitation of the adoption of the Economic Community of West African States (ECOWAS) and Organisation of African Unity (OAU) mechanisms for peace and conflict management. Additionally, she had advised the Assistant Secretary-General for Political Affairs at the United Nations, expanding the relationship between the United Nations and the African Union.

Additionally, she served as the Director of the Africa Programme at the International Peace Academy, as an Associate Research Professor at the Nigerian Institute of International Affairs, as the Director of Studies at the Command and Staff College, Jaji, Nigeria, and as a lecturer at the Nigerian War College and the Institute for Strategic Studies, Kuru, Nigeria.

She was proficient in English and French and wrote and published several books and articles in academic journals.

== Personal life ==
She is survived by her husband and six children.

== Publications ==
=== Books ===
- Vogt, M.A. ed., 1992. The Liberian crisis and ECOMOG: a bold attempt at regional peace keeping. Gabumo Pub. Co.
- Vogt, M.A. and Ekoko, A.E., 1990. Nigerian defence policy: Issues and problems. Malthouse Press.
- Vogt, M.A. and Aminu, L.S. eds., 1996. Peace-keeping as a security strategy in Africa: Chad and Liberia as case studies (Vol. 1). Fourth Dimension Pub. Co.

=== Reports ===
- Vogt, M.A. and Muyangwa, M., 2000. An Assessment of the OAU Mechanism for Conflict Prevention, Management and Resolution, 1993-2000. International Peace Institute.
