= Chander Prakash (general) =

Indian army general

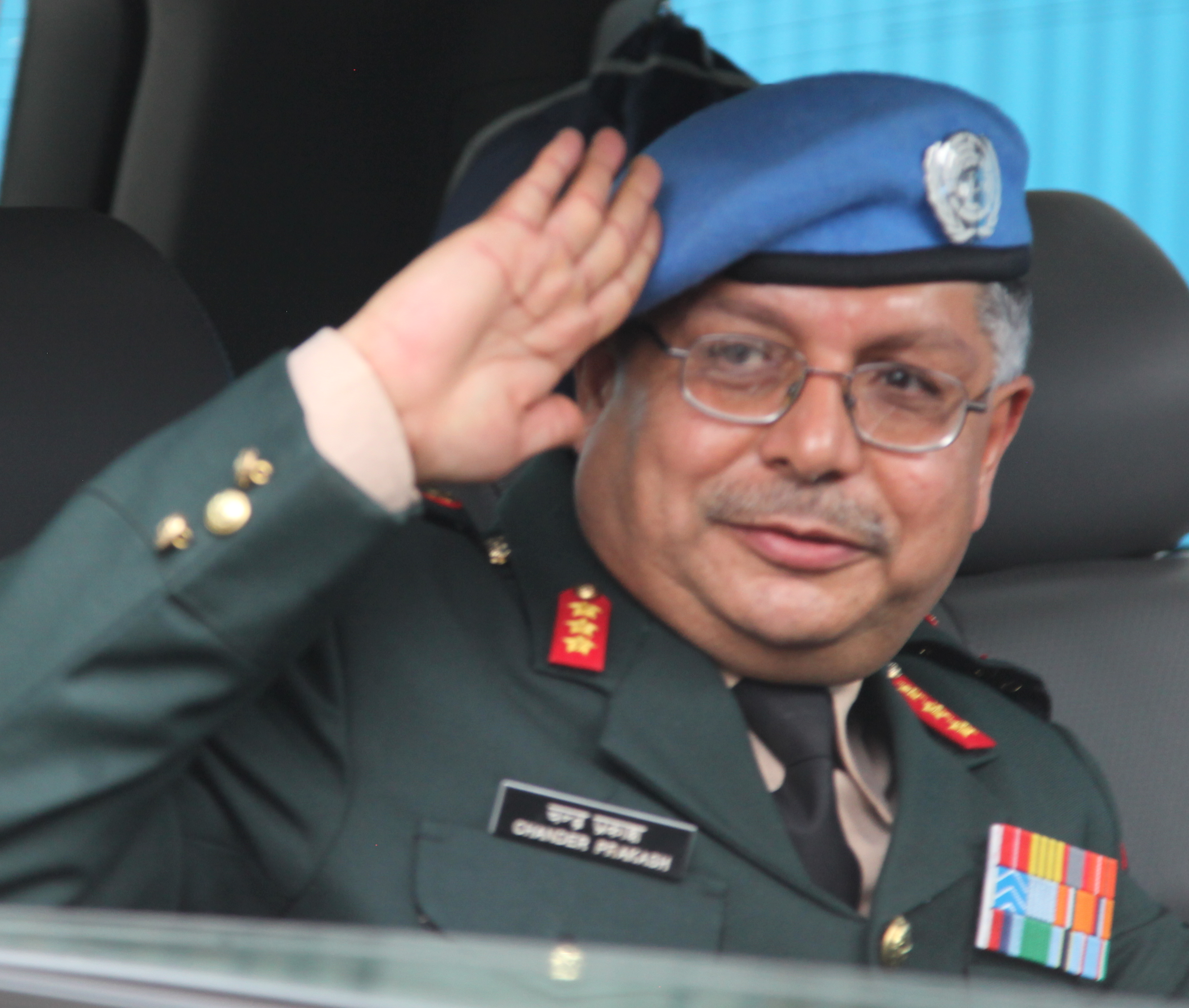
- Born: 1953 (age 72–73)
- Military career
- Allegiance: India, United Nations
- Branch: Indian Army
- Rank: Lieutenant general
- Commands: MONUSCO (2010–2013)
- Conflicts: M23 rebellion
- Awards: SM; VSM

Chander Prakash Wadhwa SM, VSM, (born 1953) is a senior Indian Army Lt. General who was Force Commander of MONUSCO, the United Nations mission in the Democratic Republic of the Congo. He served from August 2010 until 31 March 2013.

He joined the Indian Army in June 1973. From 1989 to 1990 he served as a military observer for the UNIIMOG mission in Iraq and Iran. He has also commanded a mountain division and a counter insurgency brigade. From January 2005 until February 2008, he was the military attaché of the Indian Embassy in Paris, France. His responsibilities included defensive cooperation with France and the Benelux-countries. He later became Additional Directorate General of Staff Duties at the Indian Integrated Headquarters of Ministry of Defence, where he was responsible for the peacekeeping operations of India.

Prakash was appointed as Force Commander of MONUSCO in August 2010, he succeeded Babacar Gaye. He himself was succeeded by Brazilian Divisional General Carlos Alberto dos Santos Cruz in March 2013.

== Awards and decorations ==

Sena Medal	Vishisht Seva Medal	Special Service Medal	Sainya Seva Medal
High Altitude Service Medal	Videsh Seva Medal	50th Anniversary of Independence Medal	30 Years Long Service Medal
20 Years Long Service Medal	9 Years Long Service Medal	UN Mission in Congo Medal	UN Mission in Liberia Medal

Diplomatic posts
Preceded by Babacar Gaye	Force Commander of MONUSCO; 2010–2013	Succeeded by Carlos Alberto dos Santos Cruz
