= Mountaga Diallo =

Senegalese diplomat and army general

General Mountaga Diallo
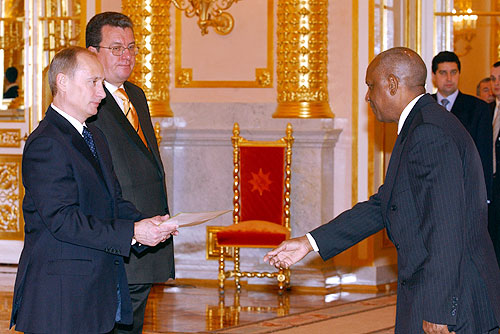
- Diallo presenting his credentials to Vladimir Putin in February 2005
- Born: 1942
- Died: 4 September 2017 (aged 74–75)
- Military career
- Allegiance: Senegal
- Branch: Senegalese Army
- Rank: General
- Commands: United Nations Mission in the Democratic Republic of the Congo (2000–2004)
- Awards: United Nations Medal
- Other work: Ambassador of Senegal to Russia

Mountaga Diallo (1942–4 September 2017) was a Senegalese diplomat and army general. He was an Ambassador of Senegal to Russia, presenting his credentials to Russian president Vladimir Putin on 17 February 2005 and died in office. He previously served as the Force Commander of MONUC from 2000 to 2004.

== Awards ==
- United Nations Medal (MONUSCO - DRC (Numeral 8))

Military offices
New office	Force Commander of MONUSCO; 2000–2004	Succeeded by Samaila Iliya
Diplomatic posts
Unknown	Ambassador of Senegal to Russia; 2005–2017	Unknown
