= MONUSCO =

United Nations peacekeeping force in DRC

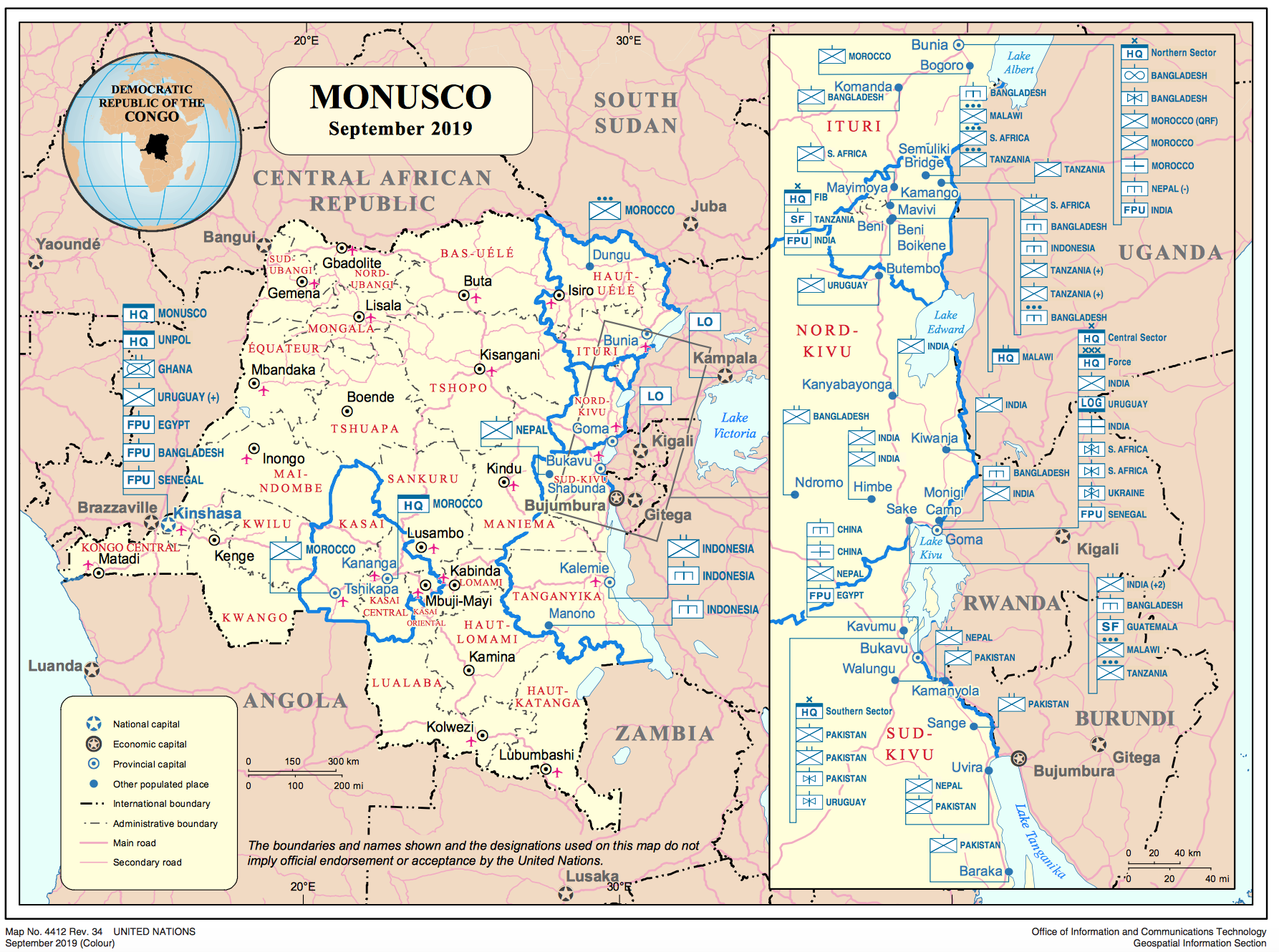
- MONUSCO deployment in September 2019
- Formation: 30 November 1999
- Type: Peacekeeping mission
- Legal status: Active
- Headquarters: Kinshasa, DR Congo
- Head: Bintou Keita
- Parent organization: UN Security Council
- Subsidiaries: Force Intervention Brigade
- Website: Official website

The United Nations Organization Stabilization Mission in the Democratic Republic of the Congo, or MONUSCO (an acronym based on its French name Mission de l'Organisation des Nations Unies pour la Stabilisation en république démocratique du Congo), is a United Nations peacekeeping force in the Democratic Republic of the Congo. A planned withdrawal from the country is currently on indefinite hold due to advances by the armed group M23 in the North and South Kivu provinces.

MONUSCO was established by the United Nations Security Council in resolutions 1279 (1999) and 1291 (2000) to monitor the peace process of the Second Congo War, though much of its focus subsequently turned to the Ituri conflict, the Kivu conflict and the Dongo conflict. The mission was known as the United Nations Mission in the Democratic Republic of Congo or MONUC, an acronym of its French name Mission de l'Organisation des Nations Unies en République démocratique du Congo, until 2010.

The initial UN presence in the Democratic Republic of the Congo, before the passing of United Nations Security Council Resolution (UNSCR) 1291, was a force of military observers to observe and report on the compliance on factions with the peace accords, a deployment authorised by the earlier UNSCR 1258 (1999). UNSCR 2556 (2020) provides the authority for the current MONUSCO mandate.

About US$8.74 billion was spent to fund the MONUC peacekeeping effort during 1999 to 2010. As of October 2017, the total strength of UN peacekeeping troops in DRC is approximately 18,300. More than thirty nations have contributed military and police personnel for peacekeeping effort, with India being the single largest contributor.

== History ==
=== 1990s ===
The origin of this second United Nations military presence in the Democratic Republic of the Congo (DRC) is found in the Lusaka Ceasefire Agreement on 17 July 1999 and the following United Nations Security Council Resolution 1258 of 6 August 1999, authorizing the deployment of a maximum of 90 officers.

The first liaison officers arrived in the DRC on 3 September 1999. In November 1999 the number of liaison officers totaled 55, distributed in the capitals of the warring countries (Rwanda, Uganda, Burundi, Zambia, Namibia, Zimbabwe, Ethiopia) including 24 who were stationed in Kinshasa. In January 2000 they reached the number of 79 and they were spread over the whole territory of DRC. Their mission was to liaise with all the warring factions, give technical assistance and prepare the deployment of military observers.

=== 2000s ===
==== 2000 ====
On 24 February 2000 with the resolution 1291, the UN Security Council authorized the deployment of a maximum of 5,537 military personnel in the DRC, including 500 military observers. On 4 April 2000 the Senegalese Major General Mountaga Diallo was appointed as the commander of MONUSCO's military force. The mandate was to monitor the implementation of the Ceasefire Agreement and the redeployment of belligerent forces, to develop an action plan for the overall implementation of the Ceasefire Agreement, to work with the parties to obtain the release of all prisoners of war, military captives and the return of the remains, to facilitate humanitarian assistance and to assist the Facilitator of the National Dialogue.

Acting under Chapter VII of the United Nations Charter, the UN Security Council authorized MONUC to take the necessary action, in the areas of deployment of its infantry battalions, to protect UN personnel, facilities, installations and equipment, ensure the security and freedom of movement of its personnel, and to protect civilians under imminent threat of physical violence.

In December 2000 there were 224 military personnel deployed, including 148 observers in thirteen points around the country. The observers could only record the non-application of the Ceasefire, the violent fighting at Kisangani and in the Équateur and Katanga provinces as well as the presence of foreign troops in the DRC. The deployment of UN troops was impossible due to the security situation and the reluctance of the Congolese government.

==== 2001 ====
Even though the beginning of 2001 was still hampered by sporadic combat, the military observers could fulfill their mission in regards with the disengagement of forces and the withdrawal of some of the Rwandan and Ugandan forces.

In March 2001, the first Uruguayan guard unit arrived in Kalemie. The force was deployed in four sectors at Kananga, Kisangani, Kalemie and Mbandaka. In July 2001, the force strength was of 2,366 soldiers, including 363 military observers distributed across 22 cities, and 28 teams monitoring the disengagement of forces. The contingent soldiers totaled 1,869. They came from South Africa, Uruguay, Morocco, Senegal and Tunisia. Guard units protected MONUC installations in Kinshasa, Kananga, Kisangani, Kalemie, Goma, and Mbandaka.

A Uruguayan riverine unit and a South African air medical evacuation team were also deployed. The deployed troops were only to protect the sites against looting and theft, the force had neither the mandate nor the strength to protect the civilian population, or even to extract MONUC personnel. Following UNSCR 1355, the military observers, within their capacities, could also contribute to the voluntary disarmament, demobilization, repatriation and reintegration process of the armed groups.

With Security Council Resolution 1376, the Security Council launched the third phase of the deployment of MONUC troops, in the eastern DRC. The site for the logistical base was planned to be Kindu, Maniema Province.

==== 2002 ====
In 2002, the 450 military observers, split in 95 teams, continued to monitor the Ceasefire along the ex-frontlines. The teams also investigated violations of the Ceasefire. Foreign troops continued to leave the country. The riverine units escorted the first ships on the Congo River, which was again open to commercial traffic. In June 2002 the UN troops' total number was 3,804. Contingents from Ghana and Bolivia joined the force, of which more than a third of the soldiers were Uruguayan. More than one thousand soldiers were deployed in Kisangani. On 14 May 2002, a military observer died near Ikela following the explosion of a mine under his vehicle.

On 30 July 2002, the different parties signed the Pretoria agreement and the nature of the mission of the peacekeepers changed. The military observers monitored the withdrawal of 20,000 Rwandan soldiers, but they also noted the rise of ethnic violence in Ituri Province. At the end of 2002 there were a total of 4,200 UN soldiers in the DRC. Through UNSCR 1445, the Security Council authorized the increase of military personnel to 8,500. The principle of two independent intervention forces – civilian and military – was also approved. MONUC was tasked to support the voluntary disarmament, demobilization, repatriation, reintegration and resettlement (DDRRR) process, without the use of force.

==== 2003 ====
Numerous DDRRR operations in collaboration with the civilian component were conducted in the beginning of 2003. Before the start of the transition, UN soldiers were deployed along the front lines. A vast redeployment to the East started. The four coordination centres and 22 bases in the western part of the country were shut down. Over one hundred observers were redeployed and Uruguayan contingents arrived in Bukavu, South Kivu and Lubero, North Kivu. Observer teams monitored serious combat and human rights violations in Ituri. In April 2003, 800 Uruguayan soldiers were deployed in Bunia, Ituri Province under Resolution 1484. In the same month an observer died in a mine explosion. In May 2003 two military observers were savagely killed by a militia.

The withdrawal of 7,000 Ugandan troops in April 2003 led to a deteriorating security situation in the Ituri Province, endangering the peace process. The UN Secretary General Kofi Annan called for establishing and deploying a temporary multi-national force to the area until the weakened MONUC mission could be reinforced. In his second special report to the Security Council, the UN Secretary General proposed a reorientation of MONUC missions: to provide support to the transition and to maintain security in key areas of the country. Accordingly, he proposed the creation of a brigade in Ituri to support the peace process.

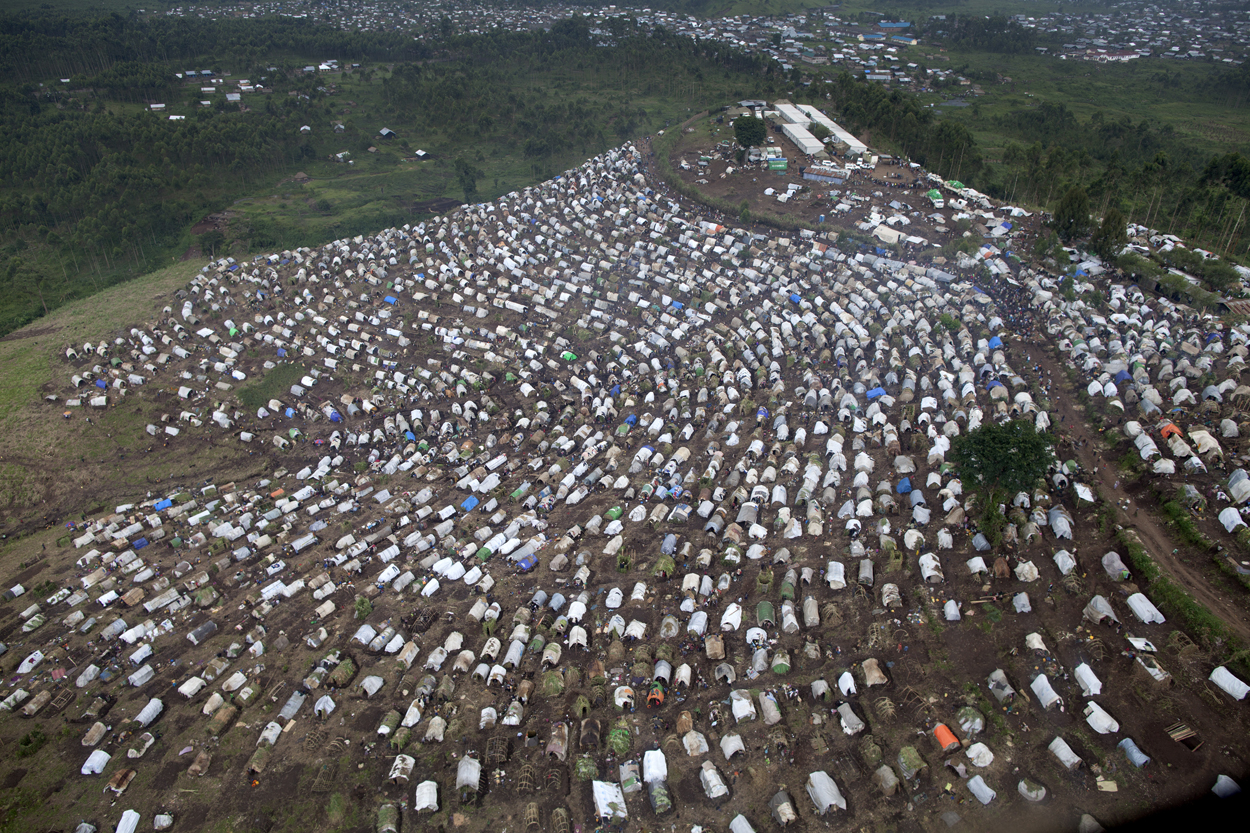
An IDP camp around a base in Kitshanga

On 30 May 2003, UNSCR 1493 authorized the deployment of the Interim Emergency Multinational Force (IEMF) in Bunia with a task to secure the airport and protect both internally displaced persons in camps and the civilians in the town. UNSCR 1493 authorized an increase of military personnel to 10,800, imposed an arms embargo, and authorized MONUC to use all necessary means to fulfill its mandate in the Ituri District and also in North and South Kivu, as it deemed the additional provinces to be within MONUC's capabilities,

The French Government had already shown interest in leading the operation. It soon broadened to a European Union (EU) -led mission with France as the framework nation providing the bulk of the personnel and complemented by contributions from both EU and non-EU nations. The total force consisted of about 1,800 personnel and was supported by French aircraft based at airfields in N'Djamena, Chad and Entebbe, Uganda. A small 80-man Swedish Special Forces (SSG) group was also added.

The operation called Operation Artemis was launched on 12 June and the IMEF completed its deployment in the following three weeks. The force was successful in stabilising the situation in Bunia and enforcing the UN presence in the DRC. In September 2003, responsibility for the security of the region was handed over to the MONUC mission.

Growing military conflict in DRC caused the United Nations to seek additional military help from major powers. In July 2003, India announced that it would be sending an additional 300 personnel and combat aircraft from the Indian Air Force to strengthen the UN peacekeeping effort in DRC.

In September 2003, the Ituri brigade was in place, including soldiers from Uruguay, Bangladesh, Nepal, Pakistan, Indonesia, India and Morocco.

In November 2003, a total of 10,415 peacekeepers were in the DRC, comprising infantry units, engineer units, helicopter units, logistic units, medical units and riverine units.

==== 2004 ====
Deploying the Ituri brigade and conducting cordon and search operations improved the security conditions in Ituri but, at the same time, the peacekeepers became the target of the militias. On 12 February 2004, a military observer was killed in Ituri.

With the arrival of the Transitional Government of the Democratic Republic of the Congo, which included members of rebel movements, more than 900 Tunisian and Ghanaian UN troops contributed to the security of Kinshasa.

It was decided that the troops present in the Kivus will be assembled under the unified command of a brigade. In March the Nigerian General Samaila Iliya took over the command of the force.

In June 2004, Bukavu, South Kivu was occupied by rebel general Laurent Nkunda. A military observer was killed. The 1,000 MONUC troops could only protect their own installations. Demonstrations were held all over the country and UN troops opened fire on looters in Kinshasa. MONUC soldiers were again targeted by Ituri militia at the end of 2004.

Though the Secretary General had asked for an increase of 13,100 soldiers, in October 2004 the Security Council by Resolution 1565, authorized a reinforcement of 5,900 military personnel and defined the mandate with the strategic military objectives of the MONUC force as:

- proactively contributing to the pacification and general improvement of security in the country;
- providing support for conflict resolution in politically volatile areas;
- improving border security through regional confidence-building mechanisms, such as the Joint Verification Mechanism, and effective patrolling and monitoring of the arms embargo;
- gathering and analysing military and other information on spoilers.

Following the UN resolution, the Indian Army announced that it would be sending an additional 850 troops and four combat helicopters to aid the MONUC peacekeeping effort.

A scandal involving widespread sexual abuse by MONUC staff became public in May 2004. The serious allegations included instances of rape and prostitution of minors in Bunia, Ituri.

==== 2005 ====
By 2005, the strength of UN peacekeeping forces in Congo reached more than 16,000 troops, split almost equally between the Western Brigade and the Eastern Division.

In February 2005, nine Bangladeshi UN troops were killed during an ambush in Ituri. The actions of the Ituri and Kivu Brigades became more robust and the pressure rose on all armed groups. Thomas Lubanga Dyilo, the leader of the Union of Congolese Patriots, and other militia leaders were arrested by Congolese authorities and imprisoned in Makala, Kinshasa. Lubanga was accused of having ordered the killing of the peacekeepers in February 2005 and of orchestrating continuous insecurity in the area. On 10 February 2006, the International Criminal Court (ICC) issued an arrest warrant for Lubanga for the war crime of "conscripting and enlisting children under the age of fifteen years and using them to participate actively in hostilities." The Congolese national authorities transferred Lubanga to ICC custody on 17 March 2006.

On 1 March 2005, a vast cordon and search operation in Ituri was conducted by Nepalese, Pakistani and South African Infantry elements with the support of Indian attack helicopters, between 50 and 60 militiamen were killed.

Senegalese General Babacar Gaye was appointed force commander in March 2005 after Spanish General Vincente Diaz de Villegas resigned for personal reasons.

In May 2005, the UN Secretary General asked for a supplementary brigade for Katanga. Joint operations were conducted by the newly arrived integrated brigades of the Armed Forces of the Democratic Republic of the Congo (FARDC). UN troops were tasked with the support of the electoral process, contributing protection and transport. In Ituri over 15000 militiamen were disarmed.

In October 2005, by Resolution 1635, the UN Security Council authorized a temporary increase of 300 military personnel to permit a deployment to Katanga.

==== 2006 ====
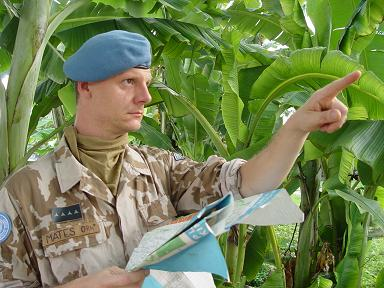
A Czech soldier serving in MONUC, 2006

In late January, a group of 80 Guatemalan Special Forces from the Kaibiles were engaged in a four-hour firefight with LRA rebels, ending with the deaths of eight Guatemalans and fifteen rebels. They are believed to have been conducting a raid on an LRA encampment to capture LRA Deputy Commander Vincent Otti. The incident caused a significant uproar from both the Government of Guatemala and the Guatemalan public, who demanded an official inquiry into the engagement.

On 25 April 2006, the UN Security Council adopted Resolution 1671, authorising the temporary deployment of a European Union force to support MONUC during the period encompassing the general elections in the DR Congo, which began on 30 July 2006.

The European Council approved the launch of the EU military operation, EUFOR RD Congo, and appointed Lieutenant General Karlheinz Viereck (Germany) as Operation Commander and Major General Christian Damay (France) as EU Force Commander. The Operational Headquarters was the German-nominated Armed Forces Operational Command – Einsatzführungskommando – at Potsdam, Germany. The mission was tasked with:

- supporting and providing security to MONUC installations and personnel;
- contributing to airport protection in Kinshasa;
- contributing to the protection of civilians under imminent threat of physical violence;
- evacuation operations in case of emergency.

This mission ended on 30 November 2006.

==== 2007 ====
In May 2007, India announced that it would be sending an additional 70 Indian Air Force personnel to join the MONOU effort.

==== 2008 ====
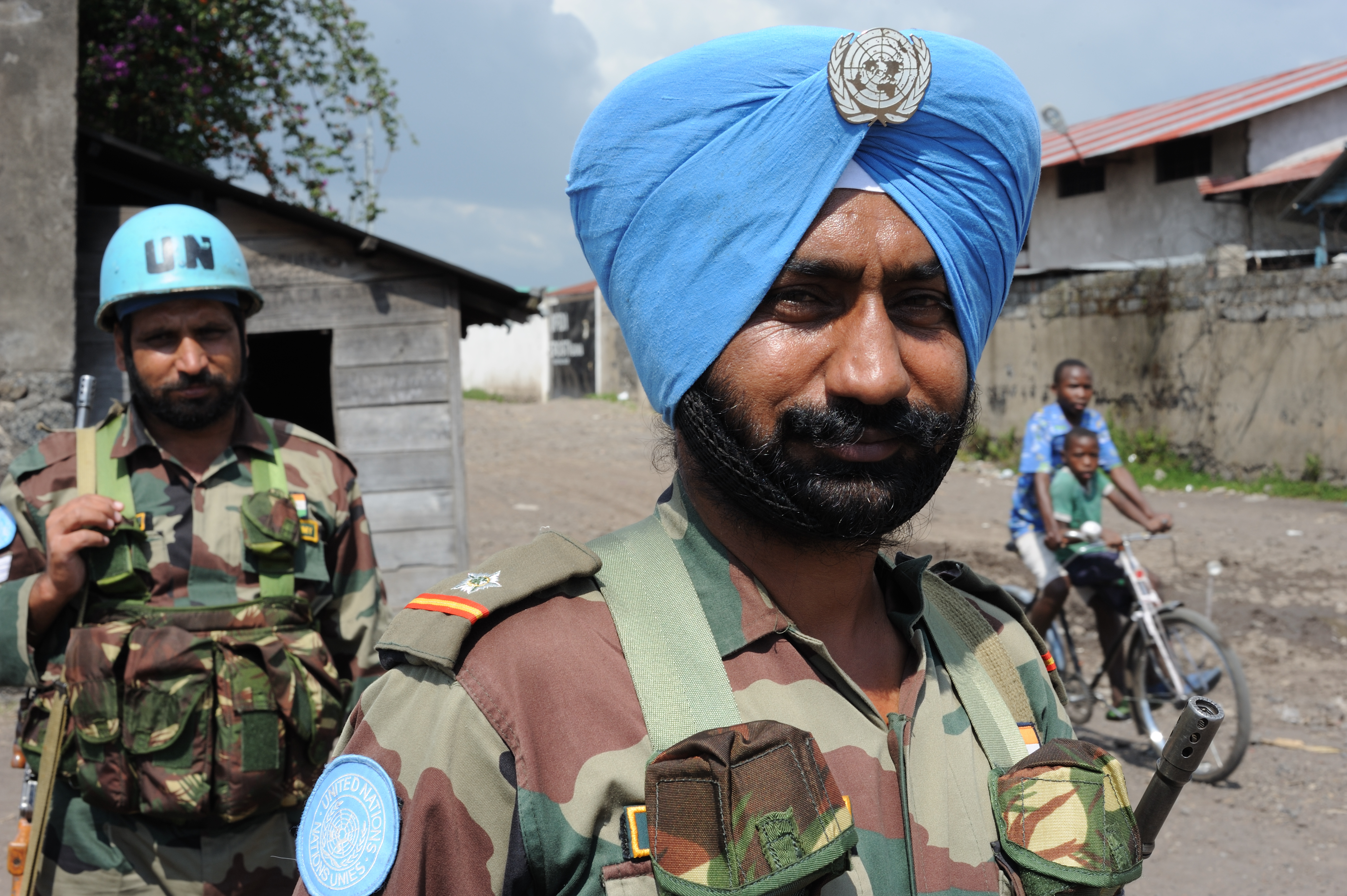
Indian peacekeepers on duty, protecting aid workers. India was the single largest contributor of personnel.

In August 2008, an internal investigation led by the Indian Army and other MONOU officers revealed that about ten Indian peacekeepers may have been involved in abuse and exploitation in Congo. Earlier in May 2008, the vice chief of the Indian Army visited Congo to look into these allegations and by August 2008, the Indian Army had launched an official probe to look into these allegations.

On 26 October 2008 Rally for Congolese Democracy (RCD) forces of Laurent Nkunda seized a major military camp, along with Virunga National Park for use as a base to launch attacks. This occurred after a peace treaty failed, with the resultant fighting displacing thousands. The park was taken due to its strategic location on a main road leading to the city of Goma.

On 27 October 2008 riots began around the United Nations compound in Goma, and civilians pelted the building with rocks and threw Molotov cocktails, claiming that the UN forces had done nothing to prevent the RCD advance. The Congolese national army also retreated under pressure from the rebel army in a "major retreat".

Meanwhile, United Nations gunships and armoured vehicles were used in an effort to halt the advance of the rebels, who claimed to be within 7 miles (11 km) of Goma. Special Representative of the UN Secretary-General for DRC Alan Doss explained the necessity of engaging the rebels, stating that "[the UN] can't allow population centres to be threatened ... [the UN] had to engage."

Indian Army personnel were asked to deploy themselves from Goma to adjoining North Kivu province, after the Uruguayan battalion deployed in the region fled. However, after that several Uruguayan battalions were playing a crucial role in the buffer zone between the retreating government soldiers and the advancing rebels.

On 29 October 2008, a French request for an EU reinforcement of 1,500 troops was refused by several countries and appeared unlikely to materialize; however, the UN forces stated they would act to prevent takeovers of population centres.

In November 2008, India announced that it would be sending the 3rd battalion of the 3rd Gorkha Rifles regiment to replace a Sikh Light Infantry battalion and join the peace-keeping effort in the Congo. India made the decision to send its elite forces amidst rising concerns that Indian peace-keepers were getting caught in the cross-fire between DRC government troops and rebels.

On 4 November 2008, a 200-fighter strong Mai Mai militia force launched a surprise attack on CNDP troops in Kiwanja, a CNDP-controlled town near Rutshuru, North Kivu. The Mai Mai were initially able to retake the town but a speedy counter-attack returned control to the CNDP less than 24-hours later. After the town was retaken, CNDP forces under the command of Bosco Ntaganda combed through Kiwanja, searching out boys and men – who they accused of collaborating with the Mai Mai – and executing them on the spot. Older members of the community, both men and women, were also murdered. A large number of women were raped and assaulted. By the end of 5 November, over 150 civilians had been killed in Kiwanja in what has since been dubbed the Kiwanja Massacre.

A UN base was situated less than 1 mi (1.6 km) from Kiwanja and over 100 Indian peacekeepers were present at the time of the attacks but the forces lacked basic intelligence capabilities – no one in the base spoke the necessary languages, as their interpreter had been reassigned without replacement a week prior – and the peacekeepers later said they had no idea the massacre was taking place until it was over. Lt. Col. H. S. Brar, commander of the Indian peacekeepers at Kiwanja summarized the failure as the result of "poor communication and staffing, inadequate equipment, intelligence breakdowns and spectacularly bad luck." In its report on the massacre, Human Rights Watch largely supported Brar's assessment but further observed that competing priorities from headquarters in Goma shifted focus to "assuring the security of humanitarian workers, a foreign journalist, and a group of military observers, rather than protecting the civilian population."

In the immediate aftermath of the Kiwanja Massacre, the recently appointed civilian and military heads of the UN peacekeeping force in North Kivu, Hiroute Guebre Sellassie and Gen. Bipin Rawat, brought their commands together for evaluation. As a result, the MONUC civilian and military teams in North Kivu "implemented a number of reforms that drastically improved the performance of peacekeepers and were hailed as a model for other peacekeeping missions."

Reforms included the creation of joint protection teams comprising military and police personnel and civil affairs, human rights, and child protection staff operating from the UN's forward bases; a mobile-phone based early warning system, in which community members were provided with devices to alert peacekeepers of unrest; community alert networks that allowed for bases to be contacted around the clock; Community Liaison Assistants (CLAs), an expanded role for Congolese translators to also act as community monitors and information gatherers; an emphasis on civilian outreach; increased foot patrols; and deployment of 30–35 troop standing combat units to areas deemed vulnerable.

On 18 November, a draft resolution spearheaded by the French Foreign Ministry was presented before the United Nations Security Council. The resolution, signed by 44 different organizations and with the backing of the British Foreign Office minister Mark Malloch Brown, asked the UN to send 3,000 more peacekeepers to reinforce the 17,000-strong garrison in the Congo, the largest garrison of its kind. This echoed calls from Human Rights Watch and other humanitarian aid groups in the region, who were also asking for reinforcements to bring stability to the area. In a shared statement, the coalition of organizations stated that

"[The reinforcements] would help to prevent the atrocities that continue to be committed against civilians on an ever greater scale here in North Kivu [province], on the border of Rwanda and Uganda ... Since August 28, fighting has intensified in many areas, causing deaths, rapes, lootings, forced recruitment and further displacements of civilian populations. The population has thus been immersed in unspeakable suffering. In the last few days, fighting has drawn closer to large populated areas, such as the town of Goma. Fighting has also invaded and torn apart the region of Rutshuru, particularly in the town of Kiwanja, where hundreds of civilian deaths have now been recorded."

Local groups in the Congo also requested help from the European Union, as they would be able to deploy soldiers sooner, working as a "bridging force" until the UN reinforcements arrived. British EU spokeswoman Catriona Little stated that they were "not ruling in or out EU forces".

On 20 November, the UN voted unanimously to send 3,085 more peacekeepers, citing "extreme concern at the deteriorating humanitarian situation and in particular the targeted attacks against civilian population, sexual violence, recruitment of child soldiers and summary executions." However, it did not extend MONUC's mandate in the Congo, which was set to expire at the end of 2008. The decision was made despite the rebel commitment to pulling back from the front lines and allowing aid to reach the thousands of people still isolated, according to aid groups.

A week after the UN vote, the DRC government requested the UN to not deploy any more Indian troops in the east of the country, arguing that there was a need to "redress the balance" of the make-up of the 17,000-strong UN force in the country.

==== 2009 ====
On 17 February, Egypt announced that it would send around 1,325 soldiers from the Egyptian Army to support the UN mission in Congo. Egypt also announced that it would send a police force to help in protecting the UN mission in Congo. The Egyptian armed force would work to give support and technical advice to the Congo Army, operate armed missions in conflict zones, and provide medical assistant and support. According to the Foreign Affairs in Cairo, Egypt would send a Mechanized Unit, Special Forces, Field Engineers, and Paratroops. Egypt already has a small unit in Congo consisting of 13 policemen and 23 observers.

In March 2009, the Indian Army questioned more than 100 Indian troops deployed in DRC regarding the abuse allegations against them. After a thorough investigation, which included examination of statements by alleged victims, the Indian Army found "serious irregularities" in charges raised by the United Nations Office of Internal Oversight Services. Consequently, all of the accused personnel were let off due to lack of evidence.

In October 2009, India announced a US$263 million aid package to Congo to help the country's information technology, hydroelectricity and railway sectors. India also renewed its military commitments to MONUC while Congo expressed its support for India's UNSC permanent seat candidature. These developments helped thaw relations between the two countries.

In December, MONUC rushed peacekeeping troops to Dongo in the Kungu territory of Sud-Ubangi District where a new conflict rapidly escalated in an effort to protect the local population. A MONUC helicopter that was restocking the 20 troops stationed there fell under gunfire from armed men. The helicopter crew, all of Russian nationality, facilitated the evacuation of 25 people, including 5 injured people (including the helicopter pilot), who were brought to Brazzaville for emergency medical treatment.

Sources in Kinshasa reported that in mid-November DRC President Joseph Kabila secretly airlifted a battalion of Rwandan Defense Forces (RDF) across Congo to put down the rebellion in Dongo and the operation was supported by the United Nations Observes Mission in Congo (MONUC) and the United States Africa Command. Along with RDF regulars, MONUC troops have been fighting alongside Tutsi Rwandan soldiers infiltrated by Rwanda, with the Kabila government's support, into the national army, the Armed Forces of the DRC (FARDC).

At the weekly MONUC press conference of 16 December 2009, it was announced by MONUC spokesperson Madnodje Mounoubai that the first MONUC peacekeeping troops were deployed in Dongo, where a temporary operational basis is functional, as well as in nearby Bozene. The 500 MONUC troops will come from the Ghanaian, Tunisian and Egyptian contingents as well as troops from the Guatemalan Special Forces. Military equipment such as armored personnel carriers, transport and combat helicopters will also be at their disposal to support their mission.

=== 2010s ===
==== 2010 ====
In accordance with Security Council resolution 1925 of 28 May 2010, MONUC was renamed as of 1 July the United Nations Organization Stabilization Mission in the Democratic Republic of the Congo (MONUSCO) to reflect the new phase reached in the country. In August 2010, the Mai Mai rebels ambushed a base of the 19th Kumaon Regiment of the Indian Army, killing three Indian peace-keepers. The attack renewed calls in India to decrease the country's military presence in Congo due to growing conflict in the region.

==== 2011 ====
In May 2011, the international cooperation minister of DRC expressed his government's desire of an "orderly, progressive withdrawal" of MONUSCO due to "normalization" of DRC's relations with neighboring countries and containment of rebels to a "few isolated zones".

In June 2011, the UN announced that it would withdraw about 2,000 peace-keepers by the end of the month. The UN announcement came only a few days after India's decision to withdraw all of its four Mi-35 combat helicopters from MONUSCO and eventually cease peace-keeping operations in DRC.

==== 2012 ====
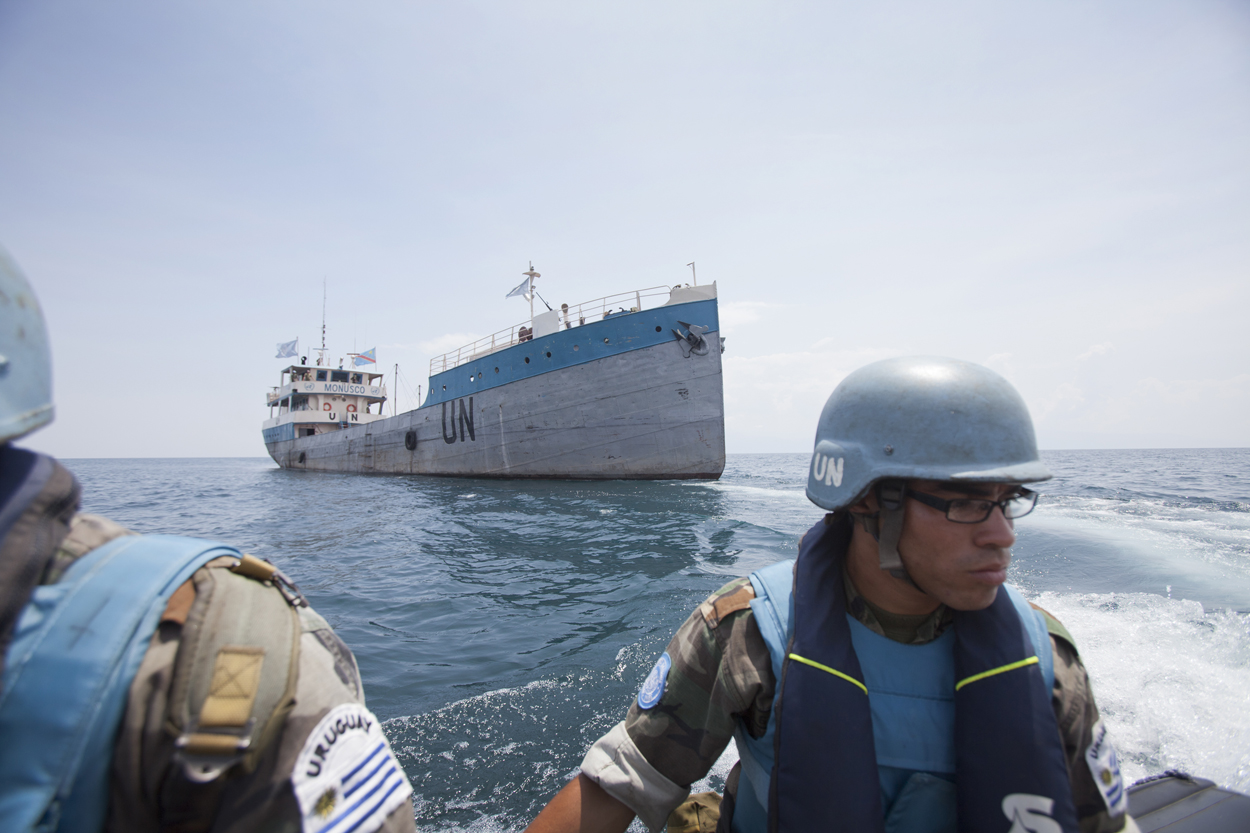
Members of Uruguayan Riverine Company patrolling Lake Tanganyika, March 2012

On 15 November, MONUSCO helicopter gunships were deployed to support government forces as they fought to hold off a 23 March Movement attack south of Kibumba; the combined army and UN assault killed approximately 64 M23 fighters.

On 20 November 2012, 23 March Movement seized the provincial capital of Goma after the national army retreated. MONUSCO troops observed without intervening, as their mandate only allowed them to protect civilians. French Foreign Minister Laurent Fabius called the situation "absurd", noting MONUSCO's greatly superior numbers, and called for the group's mandate to be revised. UN spokesman Eduardo del Buey said peacekeepers "cannot substitute" for the Congo national army, adding that the 1,500 UN troops in Goma held their fire because they did not want to risk civilian lives.

==== 2013 ====
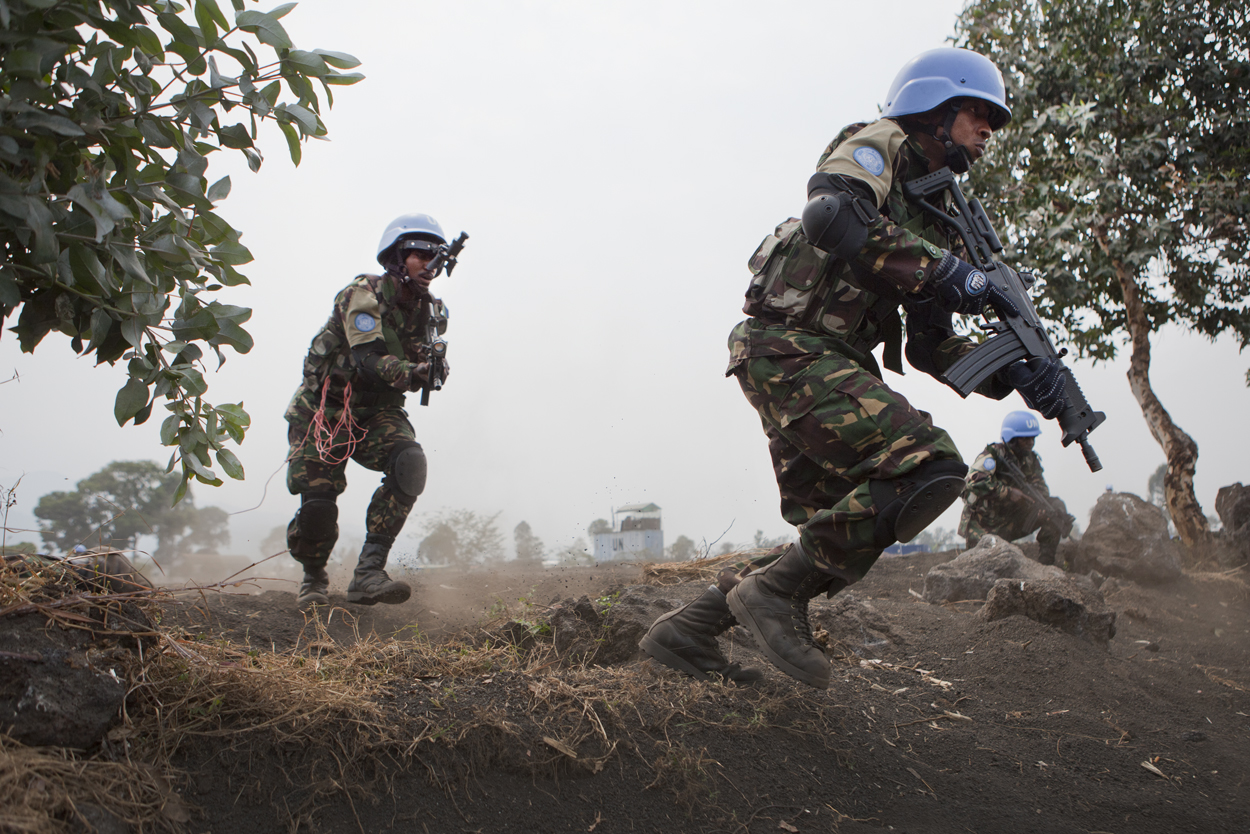
Tanzanian special forces during a training exercise in Sake, July 2013

In January 2013 chief of MONUSCO Herve Ladsous told the UN Security Council during a closed-door session that the mission plans to deploy three unmanned aerial vehicles in eastern provinces of DRC. US, UK and some other Security Council members were also supportive of the idea. Rwanda, which had denied allegations by UN experts that it has been supporting the March 23 Movement, opposed this proposal. The Rwandan delegation informed the UN Security Council that Monusco would be a "belligerent" if it deployed drones in eastern DRC.

Other diplomats, including Russian, Chinese, and some from Europe, also expressed reservations. They said there were unanswered questions about who would receive the information from the drones and how widely it would be disseminated, expressing discomfort at the idea of the United Nations becoming an active gatherer of intelligence.

In March 2013, the United Nations Security Council authorized the deployment of an intervention brigade within MONUSCO to carry out targeted offensive operations, with or without the Congolese national army, against armed groups that threaten peace in eastern DRC. The brigade is based in Sake, North Kivu, and is made up of a total of 3,069 peacekeepers. It is tasked with neutralizing armed groups, reducing the threat posed to State authority and civilian security and to make space for stabilization activities. The first Brigade was composed of three battalions, one each from South Africa, Tanzania and Malawi with the Brigade being commanded by James Aloizi Mwakibolwa of Tanzania.

On 30 July 2013, the March 23 Movement was given a 48-hour ultimatum by the UN to leave Goma area or face "use of force". Between 21 and 29 August, heavy fighting outside Goma left 57 rebels, 10–23 government soldiers, 14 civilians and one Tanzanian UN peacekeeper dead. Seven-hundred and twenty government soldiers and ten UN peacekeepers were also wounded.

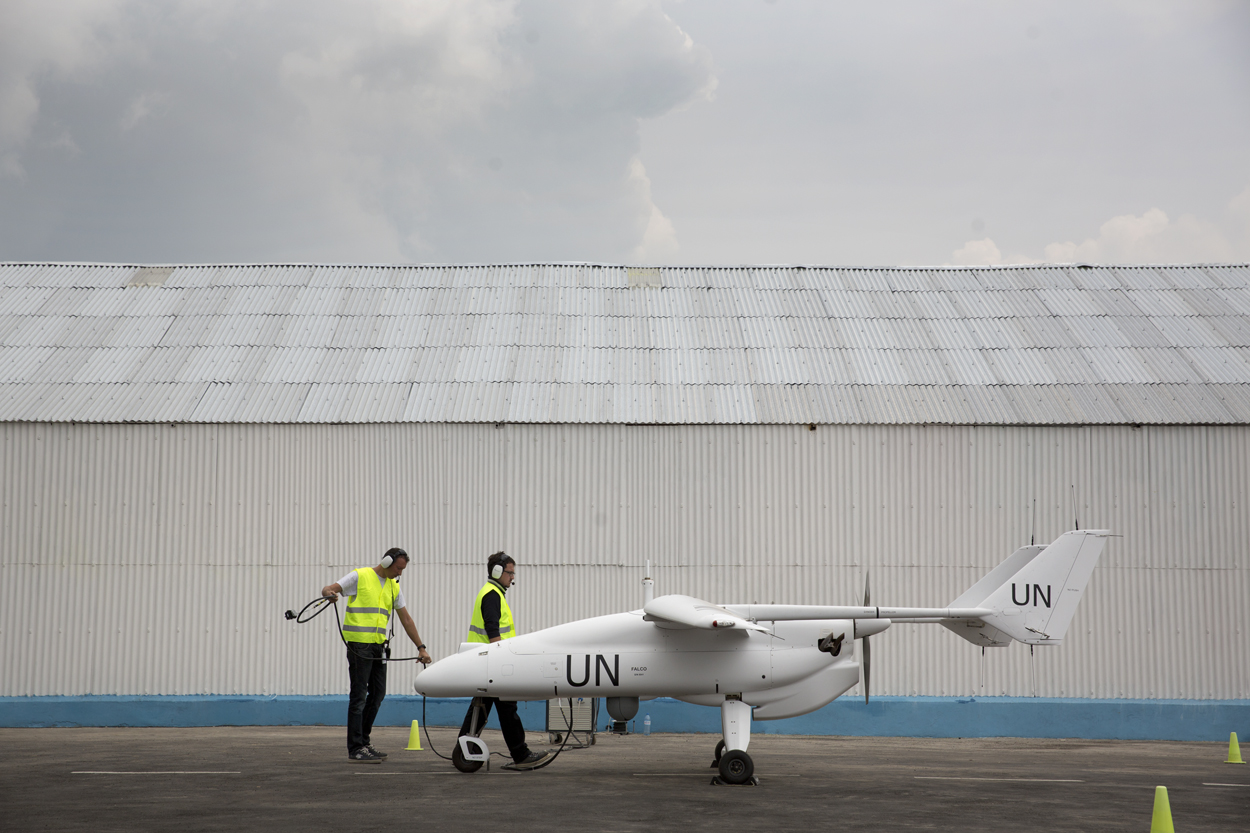
A team of technicians prepares for the inaugural flight of the UAV, December 2013

==== 2014 ====
After the 2014 South Kivu attack in June 2014, the UN announced it would send MONUSCO peacekeeping troops to the area to protect the population. "These violent acts are unacceptable and need to stop immediately," said Kobler.

==== 2015 ====
In May 2015, Allied Democratic Forces Ugandan rebels ambushed a MONUSCO convoy about 7 miles (11 km) from Beni, killing two Tanzanian soldiers. Four other peacekeepers were reported missing.

In October 2015, Maman Sambo Sidikou succeeded Martin Kobler as head of the MONUSCO.

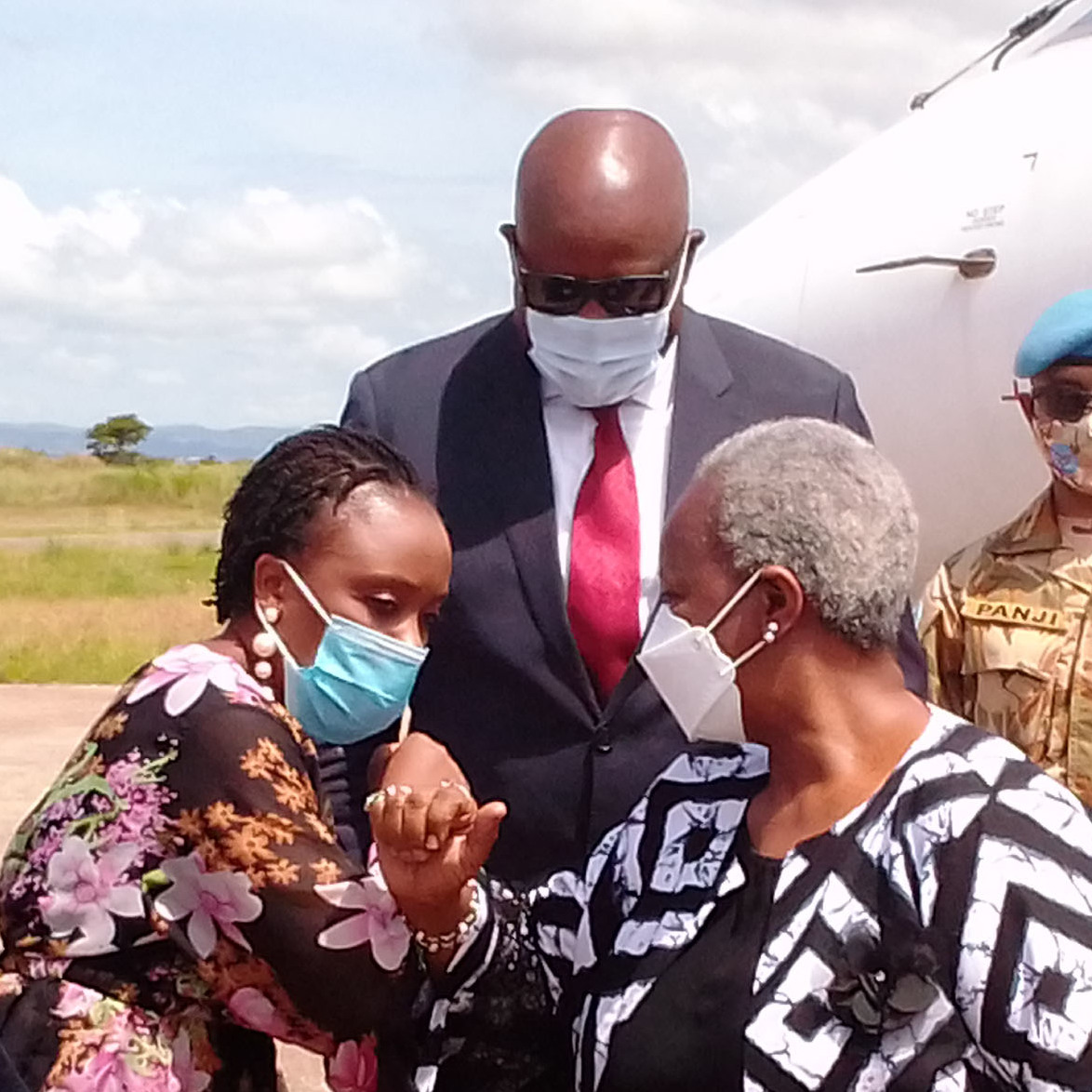
The head of MONUSCO Bintou Keita (on right) in Kalemie in 2021, observing COVID-19 precautions

==== 2017 ====
On 8 December 2017, the Semuliki operating base, 27 miles from the town of Beni, was engaged in a protracted attack which resulted in the deaths of 15 UN peacekeepers and 5 Congolese soldiers killed. 53 UN peacekeepers were also wounded. At least 12 of the dead UN peacekeepers were Tanzanians. It is suspected that the attackers were rebels of the Allied Democratic Forces (ADF). This brought the total casualties of UN forces since the mission commenced in Congo to 93.

=== 2020s ===
==== 2022 ====
In March, due to the Russian invasion of Ukraine, Ukraine withdrew its aviation unit of eight helicopters.

Anti-MONUSCO protests emerged in late July amidst accusations by Congolese politicians and civilians of failing to take action to end the Kivu conflict within the country. The protestors demanded that MONUSCO leave the country. On 26 July, fifteen people were killed and 50 others were injured as UN peacekeepers opened fire at a protest in Goma, North Kivu. The same day, three peacekeepers and seven civilians were killed during an attack on a MONUSCO base by protesters in Butembo.

On 27 July, four protesters at a MONUSCO base in Uvira were killed by electrocution after soldiers shot an electric cable which fell on them. South Kivu governor Théo Ngwabidje Kasi called for investigations as to whether the cable was shot by Congolese security forces or MONUSCO peacekeepers.

In September, Ukraine withdrew its 250 troops from the mission.

==== 2023 ====
In August 2023, protesters clashed with soldiers in a protest in Goma, Democratic Republic of the Congo, against MONUSCO forces for the failure to prevent the violence of militants against civilians. According to reports, the death toll reached 56 on September 5, 2023.

==== 2024 ====
The Democratic Republic of the Congo called for MONUSCO to withdraw from the country amidst a rising perception that they were failing to protect civilians. MONUSCO initially agreed to a full withdrawal by the end of the year, with the first phase of the withdrawal beginning in July, involving the closure of their main office in Bukavu, South Kivu. In July, amidst an intensifying offensive by the M23 in North Kivu, the pullout was halted and indefinitely postponed. Foreign Minister Thérèse Kayikwamba Wagner expressed a concern for the creation of a security vacuum, stating "we will take into account the developments that we see on the ground before making responsible decisions and starting this process when the most favourable conditions are met."

==== 2025 ====
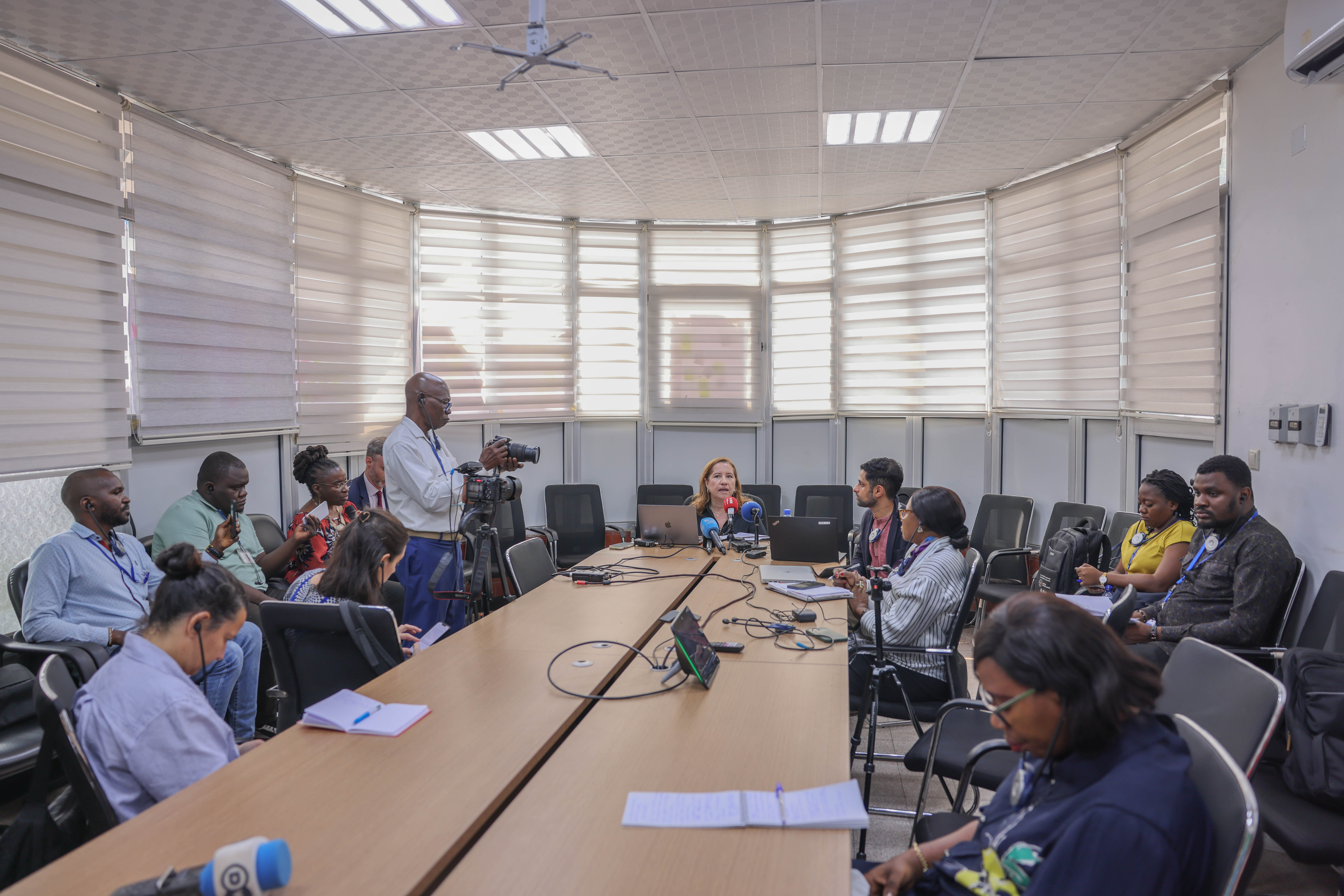
Special Rapporteur, Paula Gaviria Betancur, in 2025 in the DRC

In January 2025, M23 seized control of the city of Goma, and at least 13 soldiers from the South African National Defence Force and one from the Uruguayan Army were killed.

In 2025, UN Special Rapporteur Paula Gaviria Betancur visited the Democratic Republic of the Congo (DRC) when there were 7 million displaced people. In addition there is armed conflict and she met some of the leaders. She called for international assistance and leadership from the government.

== Organization ==
The headquarters of the mission are in Kinshasa, DRC. The mission views the DRC as consisting of 6 sectors, each with its own staff headquarters. In 2005-6, the Eastern Division was formed in Kisangani and took responsibility for the brigades in North Kivu, South Kivu, and Ituri, along with two or three of the Sector HQs.

The approved budget for MONUC, from 1 July 2007 to 30 June 2008, was US$1.16 billion, the largest for any current UN peacekeeping operation.

=== Force commanders ===
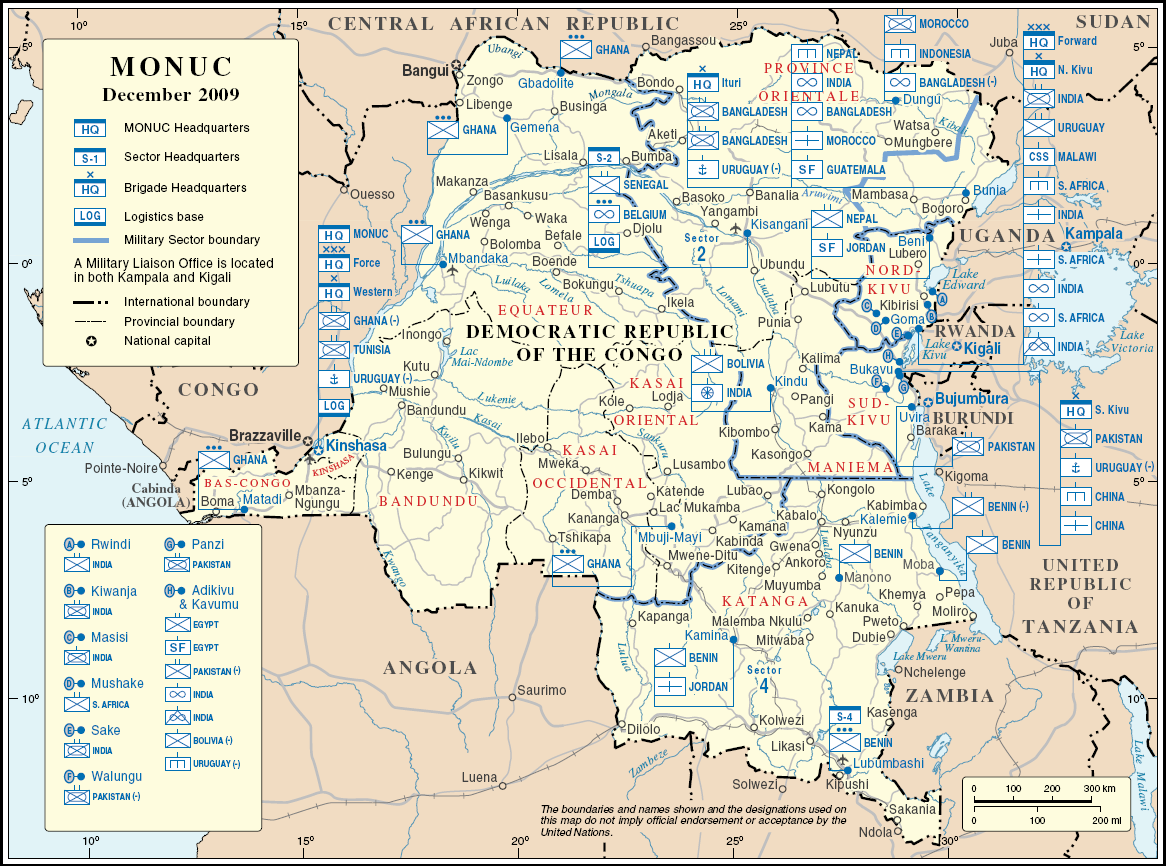
A map of MONUC units in December 2009

MONUSCO commanders
From	Force commanders	To
March 2000	Lt Gen Mountaga Diallo (Senegal)	January 2004
January 2004	Samaila Iliya (Nigeria)	February 2005
February 2005	Babacar Gaye (Senegal)	July 2010
July 2010	Lt Gen Chander Prakash (India)	March 2013
April 2013	Lt Gen Carlos Alberto dos Santos Cruz (Brazil)	December 2015
December 2015	Lt Gen Derrick Mgwebi (South Africa) SD,SM	January 2018
January 2018	Maj Gen Bernard Commins (France) (Note: Acting (Temporarily holding the post without confirmation))	June 2018
June 2018	Lt Gen Elias Martins Filho (Brazil)	January 2020
January 2020	Lt Gen Ricardo Augusto Ferreira Costa Neves (Brazil)	April 2021
April 2021	Lt Gen Marcos de Sá Affonso da Costa (Brazil)	February 2023
February 2023	Lt Gen Otávio Rodrigues de Miranda Filho (Brazil)	February 2025
February 2025	Lt Gen Ulisses de Mesquita Gomes (Brazil)	present

=== Sector headquarters ===
- MONUSCO HQ: Kinshasa
- Sector 1: Mbandaka
- Sector 2 and Eastern Division HQ: Kisangani
- Sector 3: Kananga
- Sector 4: Kalemie
- Sector 5: Kindu
- Sector 6: Bunia

=== Force numbers and fatalities ===
In July 2004 there were 10,531 UN soldiers under MONUC's command. On 1 October 2004, the UN Security Council decided to deploy 5,900 more soldiers to Congo, although UN Secretary-General Kofi Annan had asked for some 12,000.

On 25 February 2005, nine Bangladeshi peacekeepers were killed by members of the Nationalist and Integrationist Front militia in Ituri province. The FNI killed another Nepali peacekeeper and took seven captive in May 2006. Two of the seven were released in late June and the UN was trying to secure the release of the remaining five.

In November 2005, MONUC consisted of 16,561 uniformed troops. On 30 July 2006, MONUC forces were charged with keeping the 2006 general election—the first multiparty election in the DRC since 1960—peaceful and orderly. MONUC troops began patrolling areas of eastern DRC after armed clashes broke on 5 August following the chaotic collection of election results. The UN command is also arranging different training programs and competitions in Congo for both Congo and international forces. A similar shooting competition was held between troops from all international forces and was won by a Pakistani infantry battalion.

In October 2007, the strength of the UN force was 18,407 uniformed personnel, including 16,661 troops; 735 military observers; and 1,011 police; supported by 931 international civilian personnel, 2,062 local civilian staff, and 585 United Nations Volunteers. In August 2024, in part through the closure of the UN bases in Southern Sector, the UN presence numbered 14,000 military personnel; 660 military observers; 591 police; and 1,050 personnel of formed police units.

As of August 2024, the UN recorded a total of 444 fatalities among MONUC and MONUSCO personnel. MONUC fatalities (161 total) included 100 military personnel; 10 military observers; 6 UN police; 12 international civilians; and 33 local civilians. MONUSCO fatalities (283 total) includes 159 military personnel; 3 military observers; 18 UN police; 28 international civilians; and 71 local civilians.

=== Staff and forces ===
On 31 October 2007 MONUC had a total of 18,407 uniformed personnel, including 16,661 troops, 735 military observers, 1,011 police, who were supported by 931 international civilian personnel, 2,062 local civilian staff and 585 United Nations Volunteers. As of June 2022, major troop contributors, in order of total number of military personnel are Pakistan, India, Bangladesh, South Africa, Nepal, Indonesia, and Morocco (nearly 10,000).

In November 2008, the United Nations Security Council voted unanimously to reinforce MONUC with 3,085 more peacekeepers to deal with trouble in the 2008 Nord-Kivu conflict. They voted after 44 organizations, led by the French Foreign Ministry, petitioned the council to send reinforcements to stabilize the region.

In August 2011, MONUSCO forces included 19,084 uniformed personnel, of which 16,998 were military personnel, 743 were military observers and 1,343 were police (including formed units). The forces included 983 international civilian personnel, 2,828 local civilian staff and 600 UN volunteers.

==== Command staff ====
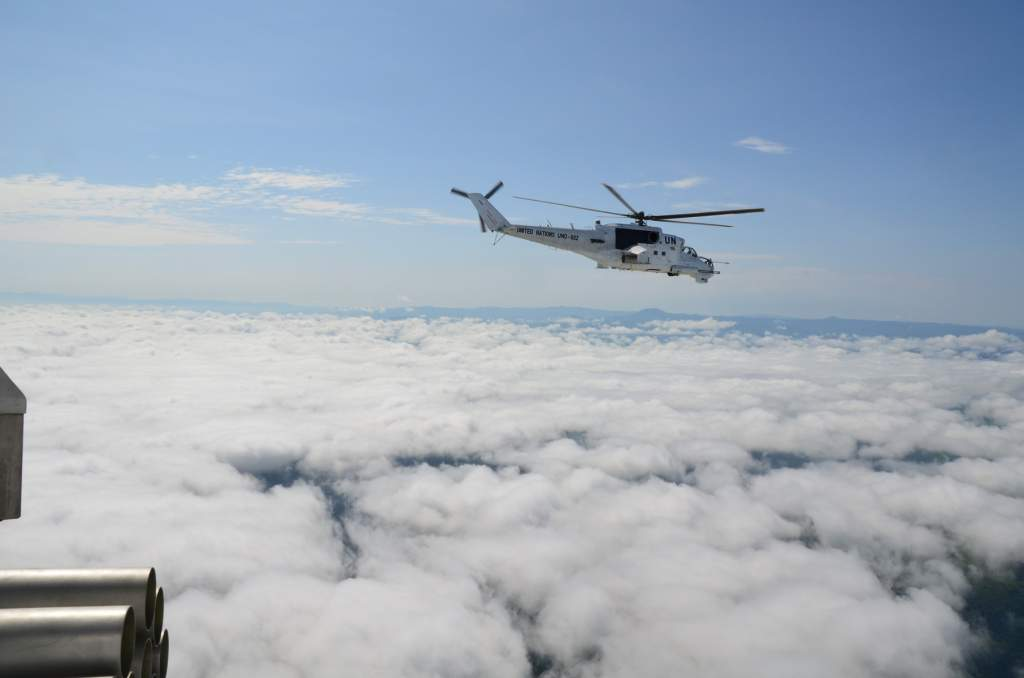
A Ukrainian helicopter reconnaissance mission over North Kivu

The names of the MONUSCO command staff are as follows:

- In January 2021, Bintou Keita was appointed to lead MONUSCO and to be the UN Secretary General's Special Representative to the DRC.
  - 2018–21: Leila Zerrougui (Algeria)
  - 2015–17: Maman Sambo Sidikou (Niger)
  - 2013–15: Martin Kobler (Germany)
  - 2010–13: Roger A. Meece (United States)
  - 2007–10: Alan Doss (United Kingdom)
  - 2003–07: William L. Swing (United States)
  - 2001–03: Amos Namanga Ngongi (Cameroon)
  - 1999–2001: Kamel Morjane (Tunisia)
- Deputy Special Representative of the Secretary-General: Abdallah Wafy (Niger)
- Deputy Special Representative of the Secretary-General: Kim Bolduc (Canada)
- Force Commander: Lieutenant General Derrick Mgwebi (South Africa)
- Police Commissioner: Général Pascal Champion (France)

== Contributing countries ==
As of 31 July 2026, the total number of personnel in the mission is 8,744:

View chart definition.

Country	Police	Experts	Troops and staff officers	Total
Algeria	0	1	0	1
Bangladesh	3	5	1,548	1556
Benin	0	2	5	7
Bhutan	0	1	1	2
Bolivia	0	0	1	1
Botswana	0	0	1	1
Brazil	1	1	26	28
Burkina Faso	23	2	1	26
Cameroon	10	2	0	12
Canada	4	0	5	9
Chad	8	1	0	9
China	0	3	7	10
Ivory Coast	6	0	0	6
Czech Republic	0	1	0	1
Djibouti	5	0	0	5
Egypt	191	0	3	194
France	2	0	2	4
Gambia	4	0	0	4
Ghana	3	6	6	15
Guatemala	0	0	182	182
Guinea	4	0	0	4
India	160	5	887	1057
Indonesia	9	1	833	843
Jordan	6	1	137	144
Kazakhstan	0	0	1	1
Kenya	5	2	386	393
Malawi	0	1	748	749
Malaysia	0	2	2	4
Mali	1	0	0	1
Morocco	0	1	712	713
Nepal	0	7	960	967
Niger	7	1	0	8
Nigeria	0	1	1	2
Pakistan	2	8	173	183
Paraguay	0	1	3	4
Peru	1	0	1	2
Poland	0	0	1	1
Portugal	2	0	0	2
Russia	4	3	1	8
Senegal	366	0	3	386
South Africa	0	1	51	52
Tanzania	4	1	504	509
Togo	10	0	0	10
Tunisia	12	1	6	19
United Kingdom	0	0	2	2
Uruguay	0	3	612	615
Zambia	0	2	3	5
Zimbabwe	0	0	3	3
Totals	856	69	7819	8744

Belgium, Bosnia and Herzegovina, Ireland, Mongolia, the Netherlands, Poland, Serbia, Sri Lanka, and the United States have contributed with military personnel. Guinea and Madagascar have contributed with police personnel. Sweden, Ukraine, and Yemen have contributed with both.

=== Civilians ===
International civilian employees and volunteers, and DRC nationals: 2,636

- International employees: 816
- United Nations volunteers: 482
- DRC nationals: 1,338

== Criminal activity ==
In 2007 and 2008, in several news and TV reports, the BBC published own evidence about Pakistani MONUC peacekeepers in Mongbwalu had entered in a gold-for-guns trading relationship with Nationalist and Integrationist Front (FNI) militia leaders, eventually drawing Congolese army officers and Indian traders from Kenya into the deal. Following its own investigations, the UN concluded that there was no involvement of Pakistani peacekeeper in any such trade relationship. Human Rights Watch harshly criticized the UN for the way it handled the investigation, providing detailed information from several UN documents, arguing that serious allegations of wrongdoing by Pakistani peacekeepers in the Democratic Republic of Congo were ignored, minimized or shelved by the UN's Organization of Internal Oversight Services (OIOS).

MONUC officials say nothing of substance about mining in Congo, which proceeds in parallel with the bloodletting, arms trading and extortion. For example, Anvil Mining has been involved in massacres in DRC. Anvil directors include former U.S. Ambassador Kenneth Brown, who served at U.S. embassies in Brussels, Kinshasa, Congo-Brazzaville and South Africa. Brown was Deputy Assistant Secretary of State for Africa (1987–1989) under George Shultz and George H. W. Bush and Director of Central African Affairs (1980–1981). Brown succeeded William Lacy Swing—head of MONUC in DRC—as Ambassador to the Republic of Congo (Brazzaville). Meanwhile, the former top internal intelligence and security chief of the United Nations Observer's Mission in the Democratic Republic of Congo (MONUC) has been worked for Anvil mining in Katanga since 2006.

There have been numerous cases of sexual misconduct by UN peacekeeping forces in the Congo. This has been acknowledged by the UN itself, such as the letter of 24 March 2005 from the Secretary-General to the President of the General Assembly.

== See also ==
- United Nations Operation in the Congo
