= Keita =

Keita or Keïta may refer to:

== People ==
- Keita (given name)
- Keita (surname)

== History ==
- Keita dynasty, a ruling lineage of Mali

== Geography ==
- Keita Department, a region of Niger
- Keita, Niger, a town in Keita department

== Politics ==
- Keita Integrated Development Project, a food security project in Niger

== Entertainment ==
- Keïta! l'Héritage du griot, a 1995 Burkinabé film by Dani Kouyaté

== Sport ==
- Centre Salif Keita, a Malian football club
- Pavillon des sports Modibo Keita, a Malian indoor sporting arena
- Stade Centre Salif Keita, a Malian football stadium
- Stade Modibo Kéïta, a Malian multi-purpose sports stadium
