= Garhanga =

- Commune and village
- Location in Niger
- Coordinates: 14°33′N 5°46′E
- Country: Niger
- Region: Tahoua
- Department: Keita Department

Population (2012)
  - Total: 69,712
- Time zone: UTC+1 (WAT)

Garhanga is a village and rural commune in Niger. It is located in the Keita Department of the Tahoua region. As of 2012, it has a population of 69,712.

== Geography ==
Garhanga lies in the Sahel biome. The neighboring municipalities are Keita in the north, Ibrohamane in the northeast, Tabotaki in the east, Deoule in the southeast, Allakaye in the south, Badaguichiri in the southwest and Tamaske in the west. The municipality is divided into 40 administrative villages, two traditional villages and 22 hamlets. The main town of the rural community is the administrative village of Garhanga.

The varied landforms in the commune consist of plateaus, valleys and their catchments. The average annual rainfall in the municipality was 458.84 millimeters in the period between 1997 and 2006 with an average of 41 rainy days in the year. The rainy season typically lasts from June to September. The once rich wildlife Garhangas has increasingly declined since the 1950s. In the plateaus occasionally grow acacia, Ziziphus mauritiana, Piliostigma reticulatum and Balanites aegyptiaca. In the valleys there is dense vegetation. The wild animal population - monkeys, squirrels, rabbits, and guinea fowl - is hurt by a lack of habitat, water shortages and increasing human settlement in the area.

== History ==
Birni Ader (also: Birni n'Ader), today an administrative village in the municipality of Garhanga, was in 1674 named the capital of the province of Ader in the Sultanate of Agadez. In the early 19th century, the capital was moved to Illela. The French first created in 1904 the cantons of Keita, Tahoua and Illela. In 1913, the canton of Keita was subdivided into Keita, Tamaské, and Garhanga. Dans les 151 communes rurales Garhanga est le premier commune . Dans la région de tahoua il y a 48 communes est le premier commune de la région de tahoua Garhanga fut d'histoire avant que l'indépendance de Niger.

== Demographics ==
At the 2001 census the commune of Garhanga had a total of 48,270 inhabitants. In the 2012 census, the population had increased to 69,712. In the community reside members of the tribes of Hausa, Tuareg and Fulani. In addition to Islam, traditional religions are still practiced.

== Economy and infrastructure ==
More than 90% of the population is employed in agriculture. The commune is located in a zone in which mainly rainfed agriculture is practiced. A number of crops are grown in Garhanga, such as the staples millet and sorghum, cowpeas, peanuts, corn, okra, sweet potatoes, Catjang and cassava. In the valleys, irrigation agriculture for vegetables and pimento is practiced. To the west of the commune there are three aquifers where fruit, especially bananas are cultivated, an important source of income. In addition, the fruits of desert dates and jujubes are eaten and gum arabic is obtained. The legumes harvested from acacia and Ana trees serve as fodder. Several factors provide unfavorable conditions for agricultural activities. These include, in particular, the high soil erosion and the uncertainty in the rainfall. Livestock are raised here, such as goats, sheep, cattle, donkeys, horses and camels.

In Garhanga there are several craft shops, including tanneries, basket-making workshops, blacksmiths and pottery. Their products are in high demand in the surrounding area due to the remoteness of Garhanga and the lack of organization in the national economy. The retail sector is predominantly managed by women, who trade peanut oil, utensils, spices and sweets. Labor migration is widespread and is operated rotationally in larger families. There are significant deposits of gypsum and lime in the rural community, which are mined in the traditional manner. The main source of energy for the population is firewood and it is used for cooking. Timber needs to be imported to a large extent from the neighboring countries. The predominant form of artificial lighting are kerosene lamps, since a high-voltage line from nearby Nigeria was passed only to the village of Laba.

In education, 41 elementary schools and two middle schools are located in Garhanga. The gross enrollment rate in 2006 was 45%, with girls being 35.42%. This number should rise with the construction of additional classrooms. There is a health center in Garhanga but not a single pharmacy.

The national road 16 connects Garhanga to the regional capital at Tahoua. For carts, motorcycles and cars, the road condition is generally poor, and it is hardly used in the rainy season. The main form of transportation is donkeys and camels.
