= General debate of the seventieth session of the United Nations General Assembly =

Debate

- 28 September – 3 October 2015 70th session 70th general debate

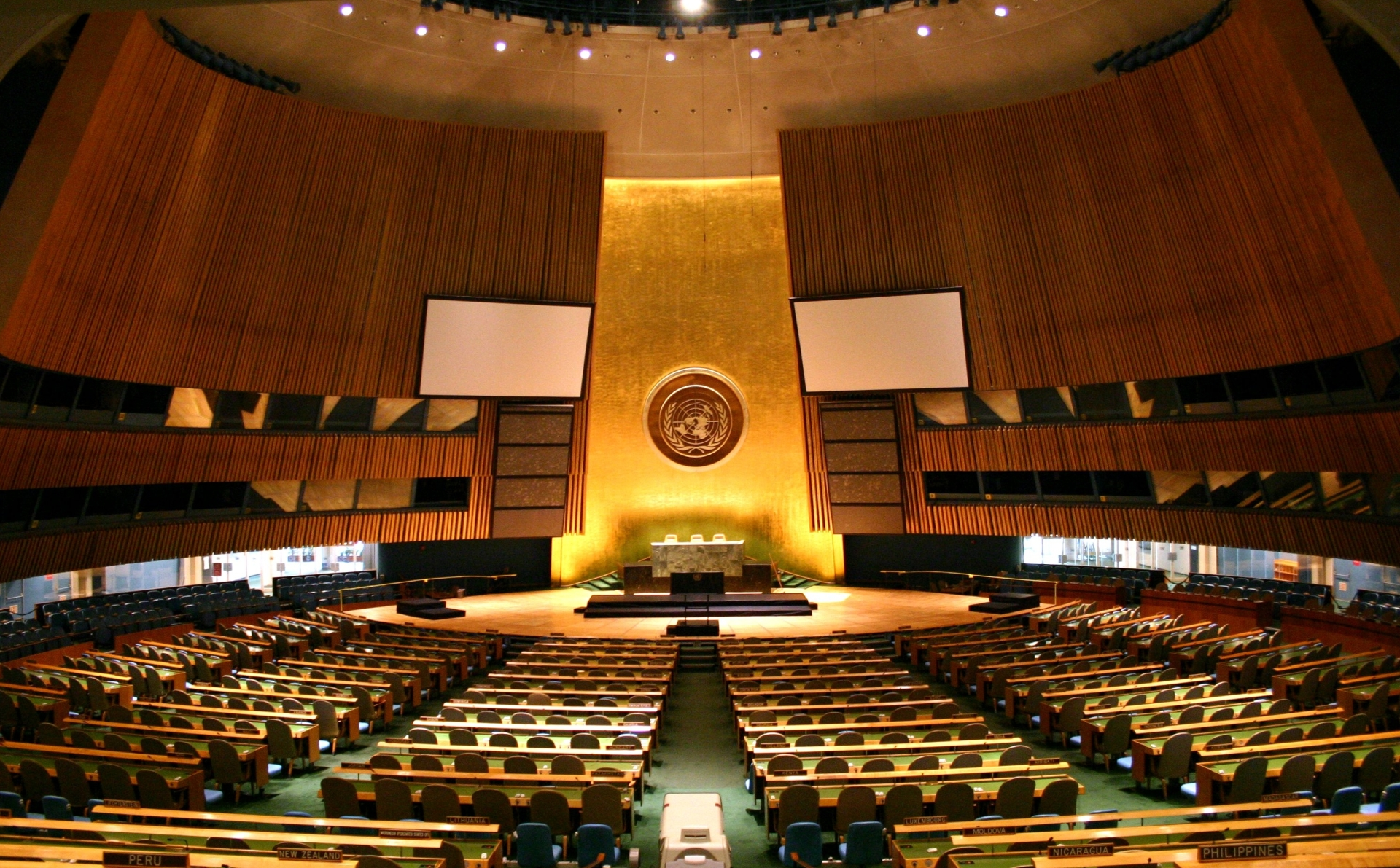
- General Assembly Hall at United Nations Headquarters, New York City
- Host country: United Nations
- Cities: New York City, United States
- Venues: General Assembly Hall at the United Nations Headquarters
- Participants: United Nations Member States
- President: Mogens Lykketoft
- Secretary-General: Ban Ki-moon
- Website: gadebate.un.org/en/sessions-archive/70

The General debate of the seventieth session of the United Nations General Assembly commenced on 28 September and ended on 3 October 2015. Leaders from a number of member states addressed the UNGA.

== Organisation and subjects ==
The order of speakers is given first to member states, then observer states and supranational bodies. Any other observers entities will have a chance to speak at the end of the debate, if they so choose. Speakers will be put on the list in the order of their request, with special consideration for ministers and other government officials of similar or higher rank. According to the rules in place for the General Debate, the statements should be in of the United Nations official languages of Arabic, Chinese, English, French, Russian or Spanish, and will be translated by the United Nations translators. Each speaker is requested to provide 20 advance copies of their statements to the conference officers to facilitate translation and to be presented at the podium. Though there is no time limit for speeches, a voluntary guideline of 15 minutes is requested. The chosen theme for the debate is "The United Nations at 70: the road ahead for peace, security and human rights."

== Speaking schedule ==
The rest of the speaking schedule in the General Assembly Chamber is as follows:

=== 28 September ===
Morning schedule

- United Nations – Secretary-General Ban Ki-moon
- United Nations – 70th Session of the United Nations General Assembly – President Mogens Lykketoft
- Brazil – President Dilma Rousseff
- United States – President Barack Obama
- Poland – President Andrzej Duda (Note: First speech to the UNGA General Debate.)
- China – CCP General Secretary and President Xi Jinping (Note: First speech to the UNGA General Debate.)
- Jordan – King Abdullah II Ibn Al Hussein
- Russian Federation – President Vladimir Putin
- South Korea – President Park Geun-hye
- Iran – President Hassan Rouhani
- France – President François Hollande (Scheduled)
- Qatar – Amir Sheikh Sheikh Tamim Bin Hamad Al-Thani
- France – President François Hollande
- Mozambique – President Filipe Jacinto Nyusi (Note: First speech to the UNGA General Debate.)
- Netherlands – King Willem-Alexander (Note: First speech to the UNGA General Debate.)
- Kazakhstan – President Nursultan Nazarbayev (Note: Speech was interrupted due to the unavailability of translation, but resumed a few minutes later.)
- Mexico – President Enrique Peña Nieto
- Portugal – President Aníbal António Cavaco Silva
- Denmark – Prime Minister Lars Løkke Rasmussen (Note: First speech to the UNGA General Debate.)
- Ethiopia – Prime Minister Hailemariam Dessalegn

Afternoon schedule (Note: Session started immediately after a formal closing of the previous one.)

- Uganda – President Yoweri Kaguta Museveni
- Chile – President Michelle Bachelet Jeria
- Cuba – First Secretary and President of the State Council Raúl Castro Ruz (Note: First speech to the UNGA General Debate.)
- South Africa – President Jacob Zuma
- Egypt – President Abdel Fattah Al Sisi
- Switzerland – President Simonetta Sommaruga
- Zimbabwe – President Robert Mugabe
- Argentina – President Cristina Fernández de Kirchner

Evening schedule

- Belarus – President Alexander Lukashenko
- Nigeria – President Muhammadu Buhari (Note: First speech to the UNGA General Debate.)
- Gabon – President Ali Bongo Ondimba
- Paraguay – President Horacio Manuel Cartes Jara
- Kenya – President Uhuru Kenyatta
- Turkmenistan – President Gurbanguly Berdimuhamedov (Scheduled)
- Senegal – President Macky Sall
- Mali – President Ibrahim Boubacar Keita
- Ecuador – President Rafael Correa Delgado
- Bolivia – President Evo Morales Ayma
- Kiribati – Head of Government Anote Tong (Scheduled)
- Peru – President Ollanta Humala Tasso (Scheduled)
- Afghanistan – Chief Executive Abdullah Abdullah (Note: First speech to the UNGA General Debate.)

=== 29 September ===
Morning schedule

- Rwanda – President Paul Kagame
- Guyana – President David Arthur Granger (Note: First speech to the UNGA General Debate.)
- Namibia – President Hage Geingob (Note: First speech to the UNGA General Debate.)
- Tajikistan – President Emomali Rahmon
- Finland – President Sauli Niinistö
- Mongolia – President Tsakhiagiin Elbegdorj
- Romania – President Klaus Werner Iohannis
- Swaziland – Head of State King Mswati III
- Sierra Leone – President Ernest Bai Koroma
- Ukraine – President Petro Poroshenko (Note: First speech to the UNGA General Debate.)
- Cameroon – President Paul Biya (Scheduled)
- Colombia – President Juan Manuel Santos Calderón
- Ukraine – President Petro Poroshenko (Scheduled)
- Swaziland – Head of State King Mswati III (Scheduled)
- Cyprus – President Nicos Anastasiades
- Sierra Leone – President Ernest Bai Koroma (Scheduled)
- Malawi – President Arthur Peter Mutharika (Scheduled)
- Uruguay – President Tabaré Vázquez (Note: First speech to the UNGA General Debate.)
- Malawi – President Arthur Peter Mutharika
- European Union – President of the European Council Donald Tusk (Note: First speech to the UNGA General Debate.)
- Japan – Prime Minister Shinzo Abe
- Kuwait – Prime Minister Sheikh Jaber Al Mubarak Al Hamad Al Sabah
- Italy – Prime Minister Matteo Renzi

Afternoon schedule

- Tanzania – President Jakaya Mrisho Kikwete (Scheduled)
- Armenia – President Serzh Sargsyan
- United Republic of Tanzania – President Jakaya Mrisho Kikwete
- Venezuela – President Nicolás Maduro Moros
- Liberia – President Ellen Johnson-Sirleaf
- Zambia – President Edgar Chagwa Lungu (Note: First speech to the UNGA General Debate.)
- Estonia – President Toomas Hendrik Ilves
- Dominican Republic – President Danilo Medina Sánchez
- Lithuania – President Dalia Grybauskait
- Seychelles – President James Alix Michel
- Czech Republic – President Miloš Zeman
- Mauritania – President Ould Abdel Aziz (Scheduled)
- Yemen – President Abdrabuh Mansour Hadi Mansour (Note: The presidency of Yemen is under dispute amidst the Yemeni Civil War with Mohammed Ali al-Houthi presiding in the national capital of Sana'a.)
- Gambia – Vice President Aja Isatou Njie-Saidy
- Thailand – Prime Minister General Prayut Chan-o-Cha
- Saint Vincent and the Grenadines – Prime Minister Ralph Gonsalves
- Tunisia – Head of Government Habib Essid (Note: First speech to the UNGA General Debate.)
- Tonga – Prime Minister Samuela 'Akilisi Pohiva (Note: First speech to the UNGA General Debate.)
- United Kingdom of Great Britain and Northern Ireland – Secretary of State Philip Hammond (Scheduled)
- Australia – Minister of Foreign Affairs Julie Bishop
- United Kingdom of Great Britain and Northern Ireland – Secretary of State Philip Hammond
- United Republic of Tanzania – President Jakaya Mrisho Kikwete (Re-scheduled)
- Cameroon – Minister of External Affairs Pierre Moukoko Mbonjo (Re-scheduled)
- Mauritania – Minister of Foreign Affairs Hamadi Ould Meimou

=== 30 September ===
Morning schedule

- Bulgaria – President Rosen Plevneliev
- Panama – President Juan Carlos Varela Rodriguez
- Sri Lanka – President Maithripala Sirisena (Note: First speech to the UNGA General Debate.)
- Croatia – President Kolinda Grabar-Kitarović (Note: First speech to the UNGA General Debate.)
- Costa Rica – President Luis Guillermo Solís Rivera
- Ghana – President John Dramani Mahama
- Togo – President Faure Essozimna Gnassingbé
- Benin – President Boni Yayi (Scheduled)
- Brunei Darussalam – Sultan and Yang Di Pertuan Hassanal Bolkiah Mu'Izzaddin Waddaulah
- Palestine – President Mahmoud Abbas
- Turkey – Prime Minister Ahmet Davutoğlu (Note: First speech to the UNGA General Debate as prime minister (previously as foreign minister).)
- Bangladesh – Prime Minister Sheikh Hasina
- Sweden – Prime Minister Stefan Löfven (Note: First speech to the UNGA General Debate.)
- Pakistan – Prime Minister Muhammad Nawaz Sharif
- Norway – Prime Minister Erna Solberg
- Fiji – Prime Minister Josaia Voreqe Bainimarama
- Malta – Prime Minister Joseph Muscat
- Belgium – Prime Minister Charles Michel
- Lebanon – President of the Council of Ministers Tammam Salam

Afternoon schedule

- Latvia – President Raimonds Vējonis
- Serbia – President Tomislav Nikolić
- Djibouti – President Ismaïl Omar Guelleh
- Laos – General Secretary and President Choummaly Sayasone
- Central African Republic – President Catherine Samba-Panza (Scheduled)
- Nauru – President Baron Divavesi Waqa
- Libya – Head of State Aguila Saleh Issa Gwaider (Note: The government of Libya is disputed between a parliament sitting in the national capital of Tripoli and another that is temporarily sitting in Tobruk.)
- Marshall Islands – President Christopher Loeak
- Comoros – President Ikililou Dhoinine
- Equatorial Guinea – Vice-President Teodoro Nguema Obiang Mangue (Note: First speech to the UNGA General Debate.)
- Slovenia – Prime Minister Miro Cerar (Note: First speech to the UNGA General Debate.)
- Vanuatu – Prime Minister Meltek Sato Kilman Livtuvanu (Note: First speech to the UNGA General Debate.)

Evening schedule

- Samoa – Prime Minister Tuilaepa Sailele Malielegaoi
- Iraq – Prime Minister Haider al Abadi (Note: First speech to the UNGA General Debate.)
- Moldova – Prime Minister Valeriu Streleț (Note: First speech to the UNGA General Debate.)
- Benin – Prime Minister Lionel Zinsou (Re-scheduled)
- Morocco – Crown Prince Prince Moulay Rachid
- Benin – Prime Minister Lionel Zinsou
- Monaco – Minister of Foreign Affairs Gilles Tonelli
- Azerbaijan – Minister of Foreign Affairs Elmar Mammadyarov
- Spain – Minister of Foreign Affairs José Manuel Garcia Margallo (Note: First speech to the UNGA General Debate.)
- Burkina Faso – Minister of Foreign Affairs Bédializoun Moussa Nebie (Scheduled)
- Central African Republic – President Catherine Samba-Panza (Re-scheduled)
- Central African Republic – Minister of Foreign Affairs Samuel Rangba (Note: First speech to the UNGA General Debate.)

==== Right of Reply ====
Member states have the option to reply to comments on the day (or even to the days prior), but are limited to 10 minutes for the first response and five minutes for the second response. All speeches are made from the floor, as opposed to the podium for the General Debate.

India responded to Pakistan saying that it was regrettable to once again choose to "misuse the UNGA to distort reality and portray a false sense of a picture in our region." According to them, Pakistan claims to be the primary victim of terrorism but "in truth it is the victim of its own policies of breeding and sponsoring terrorists" and that the Kashmir conflict issue carries no credibility with the world. They further agreed that Kashmir is under foreign occupation, but by Pakistan in Azad Kashmir. They also alleged that "in fact reservation of the Pakistan-China corridor goes through Indian territory illegally occupied by Pakistan" and that they deeply regret the Kashmir is unresolved and dialogue has not progressed due to Pakistan's apparent disregard for the 1972 Shimla Agreement, the 2004 declaration against terrorism and the 2015 prime ministerial meeting on the sidelines of the 7th BRICS summit in Ufa, Russia. They further claimed that India is open to engage Pakistan on outstanding issues but in an atmosphere "free of terrorism and violence." In reference to the firing incidents on the LC, "an international boundary, the world knows that the primary reason is to provide cover to terrorists crossing the border. It is not uncommon for states with serious challenges to shift blame to others as did Pakistan did with terrorism. An inability to recognise it as a homegrown problem that bites the hand that fed it. Terrorism has underlying causes the same way as the poverty of ignorance has underlying causes." In using "terror as a legitimate instrument of statecraft...the world watches as consequences spread beyond the neighbourhood." India was "willing to help if the monster wakes up to itself."

Armenia responded to Azerbaijan in saying that they were forced to take floor based on accusations by the minister of Azerbaijan. The delegate suggested that it felt like one "ever had a conversation that you realise you had before. Talked to someone and you know what's coming before you you've heard it. This moment is surreal cause you feel deja vu. The same accusations are constant. On the hundred-and-fiftieth anniversary of Lewis Carroll's Through the Looking Glass the statement was from that fairy tale that everything was vice versa, confusing, upside down, the case of the best defense is good offense was a problem with short term memory. The Azeri minister is not too young to remember what happened 20 or 25 years ago." They went on to say that Azerbaijan initiated war against Armenia and Nagorno-Karabakh (NKO). Further there was no one to write this in the country as there is no free speech and that those who are willing to write the truth are immediately arrested. In regards to a Committee on Missing Persons, before coming to this New York meeting the ICRC arranged a meeting between the two countries' committees, which Armenia apparently repeatedly requested for 10 years. Yet the constant reply, despite the ICRC was that Azerbaijan refuses to meet and again showed that what they say was "again all upside down." They said that Azeri President Ilham Aliyev calling Armenia, including Yerevan, its own land is simply appalling. They suggested Azeri writers look at maps of ancient and Soviet times including the claim that Noah was of Azeri origin. (Note: The location of Noah's Ark's final resting place was said to be in Armenian inhabited area now in Turkey but just across from the Armenian border.) Instead of threatening the possibility of war it is incumbent to note that Azerbaijan initiated and lost the Nagorno-Karabakh War. It would be more useful to think of negotiations on compromises. There were also mujahedeen fighting for Azerbaijan against Armenia that were killing innocent civilians; further, they may not be aware of Azeri fighters for ISIS who, every now and again, appear on the border with NKO. If Azerbaijan wanted peace, then they should allow international observers on the Line of Contact to see who is responsible for ceasefire violations. Since Armenia is willing for this to occur, it says a lot. "Nagorno-Karabakh will be part of Azerbaijan" regardless of how many times it is repeated. In regards to Turkey, Armenia is "determined to continue towards a peaceful resolution on the basis of territorial integrity." Armenia further asks what of right to self-determination and that no solution could be one-sided, biased or have a pre-judged approach.

Azeribaijan then replied that it was "regrettable to take the floor so late (21:44)" but that Armenia was limited to entertain the chamber with fairy tales. As for history, "of course we appreciate history in our region. An hundred years ago Armenia was a vibrant multi-ethnic area and Armenians were a minority even in Yerevan. [Since then] half the population left, so Armenia has no right to speak of human rights [as] all major human rights activists fled, including those to Azerbaijan. Recently one came to Azerbaijan. The European Court of Human Rights, whose jurisdiction Armenia voluntary accepted, and many others international organisations in addition to the UN, such as NAM ruled in favour of Azerbaijan. The president of Armenia admitted to occupying Azeri territory. As for terrorism, Armenia is the only state that venerates convicted terrorists and receives them at the highest level (Note: This was despite Hungary repatriating Ramil Safarov, an Azeri soldier, convicted for murdering an Armenian during joint multilateral military drills on the condition he serves his term in Azerbaijan instead. However, he was pardoned and felicitated in Azerbaijan. Following which Armenia severed relations with Hungary amid a diplomatic spat.) including by the prime minister. Contrarily Azerbaijan is not against an investigation to bring forth the truth. In fact, it has been pressing for an investigation of all violations of international law, including war crimes, crimes against humanity and crimes against peace." However, they added that this was in the interest of the "military junta of Armenia led by war criminals. It is in the best interest of Armenia and the people of Armenia if the government does not partake in aggression and [instead] good relations with neighbours and the prosperity of its own people."

Armenia then used its second Right of Reply, saying it was "hard to argue with words that don't make sense and are surprisingly harassing." They called on the presidency of the UNGA to stop or be able to interrupt the meetings which are accusing the leadership of a neighbouring country or any country of incriminating accusations but basically, and first and foremost, this was a reminder that the delegate represents Armenia, the "home to 12 national minorities who live happily and peacefully in Armenia." While it was no kin state, everyone had the same rights and privileges of Armenian citizens. Further, there was no Armenian national residing in Azerbaijan or Baku, a town populated by Russians and Jews and a city where the oil industry started now has no Armenians. After the dissolution of the USSR, NKO declared independence and was a home to ethnic Armenians for those who fled massacres in Baku. The only mandate of an international organization that was a real mandate to negotiate a settlement is the OSCE Minsk Group chaired by Russia, France and the U.S.A. was mediating amongst the parties to find a solution on principles of international law. Accordingly, this had to be in line with the principles of self-determination and territorial integrity by the non-use of force and the non-use of threat of force, not to engage in counter offensives but instead sincere negotiations if there was a real interest in finding solutions and not a militaristic policy.

Azerbaijan then finished its Right of Reply saying that the second statement from Armenia was again "full of distortions and outright lies and against the spirit of the General Debate at the UN." They referred to the official statistics of Armenia which apparently suggested the population is 99.9% of one titular nation (the delegate sarcastically laughed) which had been achieved through "ethnic cleansing," which was the Azeri point. Azerbaijan supports the withdrawal of all "illegal armed formations from its territory and all foreign military unlawfully stationed in the territory of Azerbaijan. It would be more appropriate if the representative of Armenia did not misinterpret the substance of the peace process and the proposals of the Minsk Group. The Armenian representative trying to misinterpret is not reality, including the OSCE's principle set for the territorial integrity of states. At any rate, it is in the best interest of the UN and the international community if the illegal use of force is terminated and good neighbourly regions in our region could be [a] reality."

=== 1 October ===
Morning schedule

- Bosnia and Herzegovina – Chairman of the Presidency Dragan Čović (Note: First speech to the UNGA General Debate.)
- Haiti – President Michel Joseph Martelly
- Madagascar – President Hery Rajaonarimampianina
- Micronesia – President Peter Christian (Note: First speech to the UNGA General Debate.)
- Montenegro – President Filip Vujanović
- Angola – Vice-President Manuel Domingos Vicente
- Cabo Verde – Prime Minister José Maria Pereira Neves
- Greece – Prime Minister Alexis Tsipras (Scheduled)
- Lesotho – Prime Minister Pakalitha Bethuel Mosisili (Note: First speech to the UNGA General Debate after returning to power.)
- Georgia – Prime Minister Irakli Garibashvili
- Lesotho – Prime Minister Pakalitha Bethuel Mosisili (Scheduled)
- Greece – Prime Minister Alexis Tsipras
- Israel – Prime Minister Benjamin Netanyahu
- Malaysia – Prime Minister Dato’ Sri Mohd Najib Bin Tun Haji Abdul Razak
- Slovakia – Deputy Prime Minister Miroslav Lajčák (Note: First speech to the UNGA General Debate.)
- Israel – Prime Minister Benjamin Netanyahu (Re-scheduled)
- Germany – Minister of Foreign Affairs Frank-Walter Steinmeier
- Luxembourg – Minister of External Affairs Jean Asselborn
- India – Minister of External Affairs Sushma Swaraj (Note: First speech to the UNGA General Debate.)
- Austria – Federal Minister for Europe, Integration and Foreign Affairs Sebastian Kurz (Scheduled)
- Algeria – Minister for Foreign Affairs Ramtane Lamamra
- Austria – Federal Minister for Europe, Integration and Foreign Affairs Sebastian Kurz
- Ireland – Minister for Foreign Affairs and Foreign Trade Charles Flanagan
- Chad – Minister for Foreign Affairs Moussa Faki Mahamat

Afternoon schedule

- Botswana – Vice-President Mokgweetsi Eric Keabetswe Masisi (Note: First speech to the UNGA General Debate.)
- South Sudan – Vice-President James Wani Igga
- Burundi – Vice-President Joseph Butore
- Nicaragua – Vice-President Moises Omar Halleslevens Acevedo (Note: First speech to the UNGA General Debate.)
- Antigua and Barbuda – Prime Minister Gaston Alphonso Browne
- New Zealand – Prime Minister John Key
- Timor-Leste – Prime Minister Rui Maria De Araújo
- Solomon Islands – Prime Minister Manasseh Sogavare
- Somalia – Prime Minister Omar Abdirashid Ali Sharmarke
- Cambodia – Deputy Prime Minister Namhong Hor
- Nepal – Deputy Prime Minister Prakash Man Singh
- North Korea – Minister of Foreign Affairs Ri Su Yong
- Kyrgyzstan – Minister of Foreign Affairs Erlan Abdyldayev
- Democratic Republic of the Congo – Minister of Foreign Affairs Jean Claude Gakosso
- Bahamas – Minister of Foreign Affairs Frederick Mitchell
- Saudi Arabia – Minister of Foreign Affairs Adel Ahmed Al-Jubeir
- Papua New Guinea – Minister of Foreign Affairs Rimbink Pato
- Cameroon – Minister of External Affairs Pierre Moukoko Mbonjo (Scheduled)
- Saudi Arabia – Minister of Foreign Affairs Adel Ahmed Al-Jubeir (Scheduled)
- Honduras – Minister of Foreign Affairs Arturo Corrales (Scheduled)

==== Right of Reply ====
Pakistan responded to India's reply from the previous day in saying that India's attempts to "deny the illegal occupation of Jammu and Kashmir is a travesty to history. India deployed over 700,000 forces and is the only occupier which would oppose the UNGA resolution calling for the self-determination. There have been [over] 100,000 Kashmiris killed, hundreds of women are widows or have been raped, children too, in the state terrorism by India. There are over 6,000 mass graves in Indian-occupied Kashmir. If India has respect for international law, it would withdraw troops and let Kashmiris decide their future in accordance with a UN mandated plebiscite to determine their future. Numerous resolutions declare that the final disposition of Jammu and Kashmir be in accordance of the will of the people by a free and impartial plebiscite by impartial the auspices of the UN. This cannot be cast aside by rhetoric, on top of talks between India and Pakistan in accordance with UNSC resolutions. It is the genius of India to oppose peace initiatives proclaimed by the Pakistani prime minister here. [Instead] India puts preconditions on a one-point agenda process and is not interested in genuine dialogue. Pakistan is, however committed. Using the bogey of terrorism obfuscates the issue. Pakistan takes part in the fight against terrorism and the world is aware except India. India is insensitive and India masks support of terrorism in Pakistan. India fails to bring the perpetrators to justice such as in the Samjhauta bombings." Pakistan also cited a swami accused of terrorism against Muslims and the "sad story of massacre of Muslims in Gujarat, fomenting terrorism in Pakistan including in Balochistan (Note: India's RAW is said to have supported the insurgency, particularly Akbar Bugti and the Balochistan Liberation Army.) and Karachi, security and intelligence links especially with the Taliban in FATA. Yet, they said, despite India's "hostile attitude" Pakistan supports dialogue between the two countries and remains steadfast in pursuing such initiatives, in accordance with the new prime minister taking office two years ago. They hoped India responds to the "cherishes of our peoples."

Iran then responded to calling the "Israeli regime's Prime Minister Benjamin Netanyahu's smokescreen to hide his crimes against the Palestinian people. [He] allocated major parts of speech (Note: He kept silent for a few minutes in trying to make a point about the Holocaust of the Jewish people in relation to events today.) to attack all members of international community for supporting the JCPOA. Je and his cronies are expected to continue basking by keeping everyone [else] busy with phony issues." They then asked: Why keep Palestinians under occupation? "The Israeli regime gives ISIS support in Syria (amidst the Syrian civil war) and keeps tensions high in the region. They keep tensions rising because peace and stability is an existential threat. If quiet is back in the spotlight, they would have to explain their actions in the Palestinian Territories and engage in a peace process which for the past 25 years has had no result. [Thus] it is understandable why Israel was so angry with the 'nations' in the hall and the whole international community. [Meanwhile,] Iran is committed to its obligations under the JCPOA to bring stability and peace to the region." They concluded in saying that "[we] will see more angry representatives of Israel year after year in this hall."

=== 2 October ===
Morning schedule

- Andorra – Head of Government Antoni Martí
- Macedonia – Prime Minister Nikola Gruevski
- Barbados – Prime Minister Freundel Stuart
- Burkina Faso – President of the Transitional Government Michel Kafando (Note: First speech to the UNGA General Debate.)
- Mauritius – Prime Minister Anerood Jugnauth
- Saint Kitts and Nevis – Prime Minister Timothy Harris (Note: First speech to the UNGA General Debate.)
- Albania – Prime Minister Edi Rama
- Syria – Deputy Prime Minister Walid Al-Moualem
- Iceland – Minister of Foreign Affairs Gunnar Bragi Sveinsson
- Bahrain – Minister of Foreign Affairs Shaikh Khalid bin Ahmed Al Khalifa
- Liechtenstein – Minister of Foreign Affairs Aurelia Frick
- Belize – Minister of Foreign Affairs Wilfred Elrington
- Grenada – Minister of Foreign Affairs Clarice Modeste-Curwen (Note: First speech to the UNGA General Debate.)
- Congo – Minister of Foreign Affairs Jean-Claude Gakosso (Note: First speech to the UNGA General Debate.)
- Sao Tome and Principe – Minister of Foreign Affairs Manuel Salvador Dos Ramos
- Sudan – Minister of Foreign Affairs Ibrahim Ahman 'Abd al-Aziz Ghandour (Note: First speech to the UNGA General Debate.)

Afternoon schedule

- United Arab Emirates – Minister of Foreign Affairs Sheikh Abdullah Bin Zayed Al Nahyan
- Indonesia – Vice-President Muhammad Jusuf Kalla (Note: First speech to the UNGA General Debate.)
- Philippines – Secretary for Foreign Affairs Albert Del Rosario
- Jamaica – Minister of Foreign Affairs and Foreign Trade Arnold J. Nicholson
- Myanmar – Minister of Foreign Affairs Wunna Maung Lwin
- Niger – Minister of State Aïchatou Boulama Kané (Note: First speech to the UNGA General Debate.)
- Bhutan – Minister of Foreign Affairs Damcho Dorji (Note: First speech to the UNGA General Debate.)
- Tuvalu – Minister of Foreign Affairs and Foreign Trade Taukelina Finikaso (Note: First speech to the UNGA General Debate.)
- Trinidad and Tobago – Minister of Foreign Affairs Denis Moses (Note: First speech to the UNGA General Debate.)
- Saint Lucia – Minister of External Affairs Alva Romanus Baptiste

Evening schedule

- Cameroon – Minister of External Affairs Pierre Moukoko Mbonjo (Scheduled)
- Holy See – Secretary of relations with States Archbishop Paul Richard Gallagher (Note: First speech to the UNGA General Debate.)
- Vietnam – Permanent Secretary Nguyen Phuong Nga (Note: First speech to the UNGA General Debate.)
- Turkmenistan – Permanent Secretary Aksoltan Ataeva (Note: First speech to the UNGA General Debate.)
- Peru – Permanent Secretary Gustavo Meza-Cuadra (Note: First speech to the UNGA General Debate.)
- Kiribati – Permanent Secretary Makurita Baaro (Scheduled)
- Honduras – Permanent Secretary Mary Flores (Note: First speech to the UNGA General Debate.)
- Kiribati – Permanent Secretary Makurita Baaro (Note: First speech to the UNGA General Debate.)
- Guinea-Bissau – Permanent Secretary João Soares Da Gama (Note: First speech to the UNGA General Debate.)

==== Right of Reply ====
Serbia responded to Albania's speech earlier in the day in saying that in order to achieve the consolidation of international peace, Serbia invests in regional cooperation and stabilization. The delegate added that "unfortunately the prime minister of Albania abused the [UNGA] body and misled the UN members states that a dialogue is being conducted by the two states of Kosovo and Serbia and not Belgrade and Pristina. Kosovo is not an independent state and member of the UN. [Thus the] call to recognise Kosovo is in contravention of international law against the [UN] charter." Serbia further noted that such a comment "happened at a time of an important improvement between Serbia and Albania [as] reflect by the first Albanian [leader's] visit to Serbia in 68 years [as a result of the] Brussels dialogue, helped by the EU between Belgrade and Pristina. Such comments can [thus] jeopardise and set back future dialogue. Serbia's southern province is [one of] its government's top priorities. [An] effort [should be made] to reach a solution [that is] acceptable to all and take into account all communities of Kosovo and Metohija.

Albania then replied to Serbia in saying that it "wished not to speak but was compelled to talk as it was deemed important to say a few words and put the record straight. Kosovo is an independent state recognised by over a hundred states and is a part of other international organisations. Since the [self-declared] 2008 independence Kosovo was established as a worldwide geopolitical entity and praised as a contributor to stability. Kosovo and Serbia are bound to a dialogue to find a solution for the good of their [respective] peoples. With independence, the region has close once and for all the most bitter chapter in modern history. The energy this created in Balkans includes relations with Serbia from Albania. To quote Rama, 'with Kosovo becoming part of the family of nations after 100 of years of frozen conflict, guns were no longer pointed at a neighbouring window. After a century of conflict, Kosovo is at peace. [Albania] has contributed to the climate with perseverance and will continue to do what we can for peace to prevail and develop."

Turkey briefly responded to Syria in saying that the delegate will "not take [too much] time but that Turkey would continue to stand by the people of Syria" amidst the Syrian civil war.

China responded to the Philippines in saying that its "claim to the sovereignty of the Spratly Islands is based on historical foundation. The illegal occupation of some islands by the Philippines is the root cause of disputes between China and the Philippines...Without the consent of China, the Philippines unilaterally went to arbitration [contrary to] international law. China is opposed to [this] practice of initiating arbitration and repeatedly [warned that its] non-acceptance and non-participation is based on legal foundations and will not change. Philippines broke promises of direct negotiations by unilateral arbitration to deny China sovereignty over the South China Sea and China's maritime right In order to force China to a compromise. This will not bring a resolution. China seeks peaceful settlement based on historical facts and international law by negotiation. China and ASEAN reached a dual track approach that settlement [needed] direct negotiations by countries concerned. Peace of [the] seas [being] jointly maintained by China and ASEAN is the most realistic way to address the issue. To internationalise and judicialise will not seek a settlement [but] instead make [relations] more difficult and [harder to] justify peace and stability. China affirms [its intention] to maintain peace and ensure the seas [are used for] friendship and cooperation. China is opposed to the practice of small number of countries for stirring up for selfish purposes that jeapordise the South China Sea issue. China urges a return to discourse."

The United Kingdom's delegate responded to the comments made by Mauritius. He said that "the British government has no doubt that the sovereignty of the Chagos (Note: The Chagos Islands, of which Diego Garcia is a part, is used as a military base housing U.S. forces on the island, while its indigenous inhabitants were expelled.) as [it has] been British since the nineteenth century. No international tribunal, including to Annex 7 of the Law of the Sea has ever doubted the islands' sovereignty. The United Kingdom sees Mauritius sovereignty and will cede the island when it is no longer needed for defense. In the meantime, the United Kingdom will decide when [to do so]. Defense is used to counter regional threats in terrorism and piracy. Arbitration awarded does not protect maritime use and with no view on the MPA to maintain Indian Ocean fish stocks and maintain food [sustainability]. In conclusion, the United Kingdom should maintain discourse with Mauritius and both countries [should] enter into discussion under the sovereignty umbrella. The United Kingdom attempts discourse and enters into bilateral discussions and looks forward to working with Mauritius to ensure all aspects of the MPA" are maintained.

Philippines responded to China Right of Reply in saying that it "welcome the great concern of China to peaceful settlement of disputes in the South China Sea. The sea is an international waterway [thus it] seeks dispute [resolution] at the international level. Under international law, including arbitration under article seven of the Law of the Sea, [Philippines] reiterates that China join the arbitration tribunal and let the outcome be in accordance with international law in transparency rather than coercion and intimidation.

Serbia then used up its allocated Right of Reply in responding to Albania. The delegate said that "Kosovo is not an independent nor a member of the UN. The esteemed prime minister of Albania is the only speaker who called for recognition of a part of a sovereign country [and] its a hostile act [that should be] take[n] seriously. [It is an] hostile act to Serbia and its people who inhabit Kosovo. [By] dialogue under [the European Union's] auspices, all issues between Belgrade and Pristina are being addressed. Serbia would use all diplomatic means to protect its sovereignty and territorial integrity."

China then finished its Right of Reply in responding to the Philippines. The delegate sought to "reiterate that the illegal invasion and occupation of some islands and reefs of in the South China Sea is root cause of the dispute with the Philippines over the South China Sea. By initiating arbitration, China's non-acceptance and non-participation will not change.

=== 3 October ===
Morning schedule

- El Salvador – Minister of Foreign Affairs Hugo Roger Martínez Bonilla (Note: First speech to the UNGA General Debate.)
- Oman – Minister of Foreign Affairs Yusuf bin Alawi bin Abdullah
- Hungary – Minister of Foreign Affairs and Foreign Trade Péter Szijjártó
- Eritrea – Minister of Foreign Affairs Osman Mohammed Saleh
- Guinea – Minister of State François Lonseny Fall
- Dominica – Minister of Foreign Affairs Francine Baron
- Maldives – Minister of Foreign Affairs Dunya Maumoon (Note: First speech to the UNGA General Debate.)
- Suriname – Minister of Foreign Affairs Niermala Badrising (Note: First speech to the UNGA General Debate.)
- Guatemala – Minister of Foreign Affairs Carlos Raúl Morales (Scheduled)
- Canada – Deputy Minister for Foreign Affairs Daniel Jean (Note: First speech to the UNGA General Debate.)
- Guatemala – Minister of Foreign Affairs Carlos Raúl Morales (Re-scheduled)
- San Marino – Permanent Representative Daniele Bodini (Note: First speech to the UNGA General Debate.)
- Guatemala – Minister of Foreign Affairs Carlos Raúl Morales
- Palau – Permanent Representative Caleb Otto
- Côte d’Ivoire – Permanent Representative Claude Stanislas Bouah-Kamon
- Guatemala – Minister of Foreign Affairs Carlos Raúl Morales (Re-scheduled)
- United Nations – Closing statement: 70th Session of the United Nations General Assembly – President Mogens Lykketoft

==== Closing remarks ====
President Mogens Lykketoft summed up the topics discussed at the annual General Debate. He said that the session was "at the end of [an] historic nine days at UN and [an] historic and comprehensive General Debate. This year [saw] the highest number of heads of state and government ever gathered to discuss the challenges of development, human rights, etcetera. As we commemorate the seventieth [session of the UNGA], it is fitting that the spirit and principles of the [UN] charter and the central role of the UN in international cooperation is reaffirmed. It is [also] fitting that General debate was preceded with [a] meeting with the pope and [achieving] the Sustainable Development Goals (SDG) goals [of the Post-2015 Development Agenda].

At the outset, I would like to thank each and everyone for their generous words and congratulations and support. The seventieth session will be exceptionally busy and the General Debate helped to identify issues that [others] felt need attention. Since the summit on sustainable debate, the General Debate focused on the road ahead for peace, security and human rights. The matter most consistently raised was the plight of refugees, migrants and IDPs across the world and calls for an unprecedented global response in international law and solidarity. [In] building on the secretary-general's meeting, I will attend the global bank group and IMF meeting in Lima on 9 October and highlight the need to finance SDG implementation and a more comprehensive financial response to ongoing humanitarian responses. [sic] Furthermore, in mid-to-late November I will hold a meeting on the global refugee crisis, humanitarian crisis, especially in Syria and its neighbours, highlighted repeatedly. As such, many called for a new effort by global and regional powers for a peaceful solution in others parts of the Middle East, including the Middle East peace process, highlighted as a source of concern.

[Other issues include,] addressing peace in Africa, parts of Europe and beyond and stem the spread of extremism. Boko Haram, ISIL and other extremists...highlights as [an] affront to humanity. [Delegates mentioned] maintaining international peace and security [and] many acknowledged[d the] SDGs. [There is a pressing] need to address the root causes of conflict. Regional and sub-regional organisations [play a] role in peace and security. [Many] highlighted a critical need to address small arms and light weapons to nuclear non-proliferation. The JCPOA was rightly recognised as an important step and significant diplomatic achievement [in this regard].

Many [delegations] welcomed the re-establishment of diplomatic ties between Cuba and the United States. Cop 21 in Paris to address climate change was [also] repeatedly raised, especially by SIDS and others particularly vulnerable to climate change. More than 70 countries submitted INDCs—now 146—who demonstrated belief that Paris can and must succeed. [It] can and must bring hope to millions [of people] across the globe. [As part of the] SDGs, numerous leaders recalled universal implementation is imperative and financing, including the need for developed countries to meet the 0.7% [of GDP] target for aid. In field of health, encouraging news [came] from West Africa [in regards to the Ebola virus epidemic in West Africa], while not [yet] over, it has been tackled with determination by affected countries [and] with assistance from the UN and the world. In [regards to] human rights, some [delegations] recalled challenges to discrimination, [especially the] need to realise the rights of women and girls. A high level review on United Nations Security Council Resolution 325 on women, peace and security was highlighted by many as important for the year.

Delegations highlighted the need to reform the UNSC to fulfill its mandate and reflect current geopolitical conditions. Hopes were expressed for a transparent process to select the next secretary-general. This is a synopsis of the issues raised over the six days. The President of the seventieth session stated a commitment to address the three pillars. In conclusion, appreciation was expressed to the UN staff, including interpreters, security, and maintenance personnel. The General Assembly concludes agenda item eight.

==== Right to Reply ====
After initially closing the session, Lykketoft then reopened the session and called on those who had asked to use their Right to Reply.

Indonesia replied first to the speeches of "Tonga and the Solomon Islands on 29 September and 1 October, respectively." The delegate said that his country "reject references to human rights issues in West Papua." Such "references are dangerously misleading and compel [us] to set the record straight. Human rights protection has been an important part of the country's priorities. National laws protect and guarantee the human rights of all citizens. No country big or small, developed or least developed is free of human rights problems. Indonesia not an exception but, as one of the biggest, has put in place institutions and resolutions to combat [violations thereof]. Indonesia works with national civil society and national human rights institutions for the protection of human rights. These provide necessary checks and independent reviews to make sure human rights are monitored and protected. Said mechanisms in Indonesia are reliable and [offer] protect[ion] in a democratic manner. Indonesia remains actively engaged regionally and globally in human rights, including practices in human rights practice and promotion. My delegation is not convinced that reverence in [the aforementioned] statements was appropriate or had any merit. They contained inaccurate allegations about human rights in certain parts of Indonesia. political considerations were misrepresentations of facts. The government of Indonesia invests large resources to the development of all aspects of life in Papua and West Papua, including promotions of human rights. Both provinces have wide autonomy in national laws and elections for governors and governments, [which are] accountable to the people of Papua and West Papua, including in human rights. To conclude, the Indonesian government attaches great importance [to relations] with Pacific islands as some people of the country share [a lot] in common with the Pacific islands. To reiterate, the government is committed to engage in good faith with Pacific islands."

Tonga then replied to Indonesia. "At the outset, let me state that Tonga values diplomatic relations with Indonesia and recognises the sovereignty of Indonesia over its population and affairs. However, through reports of alleged human rights violations, [Tonga] has concerns and proposes to engage in a friendly way and hold dialogue. Not just Tonga, but perhaps other Pacific island countries, [in order] to gain more understanding, [would like to] conduct a fact finding mission with the cooperation of Indonesia. To conclude, Tonga holds high regard for Indonesia and its diplomatic relations with Indonesia but would like to register concern for allegations of violations [and leave] room for dialogue and to address the concerns of Tonga [by] hold[ing] more dialogue with Indonesia."

Lykketoft then said that he regretted to breaking order of speakers but that it was better to finish one discussion before moving to another one. He then called on Iran and the Solomon Islands.

Iran then took to the floor in saying its delegate was reacting "to the baseless allegations by Bahrain made yesterday [in] repeated fabricated allegations of Iranian interference in the domestic affairs of Bahrain. [There are] fabricated in their minds. Accusations against Iran are all the more worthless as it covers up the governments violations of a majority of the Bahraini people and sought to [perpetuate] minority over majority. No doubt as long as a minority suppresses right of a majority and [then] blame[s] outsiders, [it] will not help to resolve its own problems. More outlandish [comments] were [made] by Bahrain and later the [United Arab Emirates] in reaction to Iran over the Hajj pilgrimage this year and how pilgrims were treated. It is obvious that statements by both countries are unwarranted and unhelpful as the issue is none of their business." The delegate further took issue with others parts of the Gulf Arab countries' statements saying that the name "in reference to body of water between the Arab peninsula and the Iranian plateau" the countries "should know as the whole world, including the UN, is the Persian Gulf. From the sixth century before Christ [the name has been] used as it is today. It was also used by Arab people amidst turmoil in the 1960s. It is unfortunate that Arab officials use outdated and Cold War-tainted terms. Needless to say politically motivated change in geographical names is rejected by the UN as it creates tensions and other adverse consequences. Similarly on the issue of three islands. (Note: Iran is in a dispute with the United Arab Emirates over the sovereignty of Abu Musa and the Greater and Lesser Tunbs.) Iran reiterates its full sovereignty over the three islands and measures taken on the islands by Iran are based on the principle of sovereignty and territory integrity of Iran. Thus claims seen as interference are rejected. Iran always takes friendship with all its neighbours and all countries [seriously]. Thus. [Iran is] ready to talk with the U.A.E. in view to strengthening bilateral relations and remove misunderstandings between the two countries. [However, the] territorial integrity of Iran over the islands is non-negotiable." The delegate further took not of and "categorically reject[ed] what Canada said. [The comments] demonstrate how Canada's Conservative government believes in a smokescreen [that] hides [its] policy of distortions against Iran and how [Iran] regret[s] [that the] JCPOA is harmful to their Iranophobia. [As far as] human rights [is concerned], Canada violates the rights of African[s and the]...indigenous and [also] backs Israel...in [pursuing the cause of] so-called "human nights"

Solomon Islands then replied to Indonesia. "To reiterate, [Solomon Islands has] deep respect to Indonesian sovereignty and our relations with Indonesia. [Solomon Islands would thus like to] also note the statement delivered by Indonesia and would like to reiterate that the UN charter is based on three pillars: security, peace and human rights and development. [I] also wish to reiterate that all states have a legal duty and moral responsibility to uphold, respect and promote human rights and take preventive measures against human rights violations in accordance with the UN charter and applicable international laws. On the issue of human rights violations in Papua and West Papua, we have made it clear in our statement to the General Assembly that we would like to work with Indonesia and we would like to work with everyone within the United Nations Human Rights Commission. We would like to work within the multilateral framework, to work with the Pacific Islands Forum countries and others to address human rights violations wherever they may occur. [To] underscore, we seek dialogue and cooperation with Indonesia as alluded to by the leader of the Pacific Islands Forum. [We] would like to work with them and address some of these issues within the context of the UN charter and within the context of international law."

Lykketoft then concluded the session, including the Right to Reply and ended the General Debate for the year and continued with item eight of the agenda for the year.

== See also ==
- List of UN General Assembly sessions
- List of General debates of the United Nations General Assembly
