= Asama =

Asama may refer to:

- Mount Asama, a volcano in Japan
- Asama shrine, a category of Shinto shrine in Japan
- Asama Onsen, an onsen and former skating rink in Matsumoto, Japan
- Japanese cruiser Asama, a cruiser of the Imperial Japanese Navy
- Asama (train), a train service in Japan
- Azemmour, sometimes known in antiquity as Azama or Asama

== People with the surname ==
- Daiki Asama (淺間 大基, born 1996), Japanese baseball player
- Keita Asama (浅間 敬太, born 1984), Japanese baseball player
