= 2026 Grand Canyon flood =

Flash flood at Grand Canyon National Park

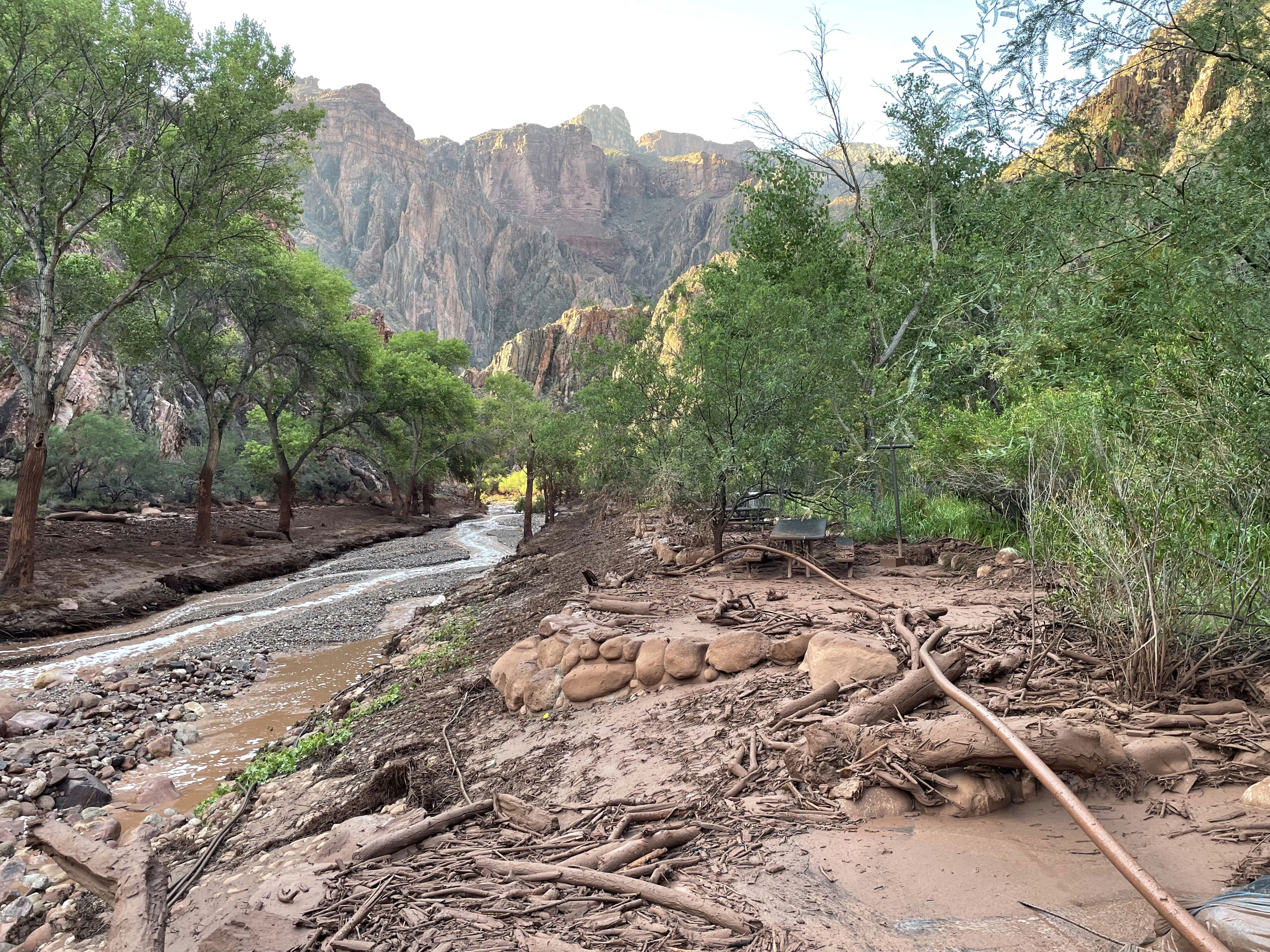
- Damage at Bright Angel Campground after flash flood, August 30, 2026
- Date: August 29, 2026
- Time: ~2:30 p.m. (MST UTC−07:00)
- Location: Bright Angel Creek, Grand Canyon National Park, Arizona, United States
- Type: Flash flood
- Cause: Compound climate extremes and heavy rainfall
- Deaths: 3

On August 29, 2026, compound climate extremes and heavy rainfall caused a major flash flood that surged through Bright Angel Creek at Grand Canyon National Park in Arizona, United States. It is the national park's biggest flood since 1966.

The flood resulted in the deaths of three hikers, while 82 were rescued and evacuated. Floodwaters caused widespread destruction to park infrastructure, landscape, and the Transcanyon Waterline, triggering Stage 4 water restrictions across the South Rim.

== Causes ==
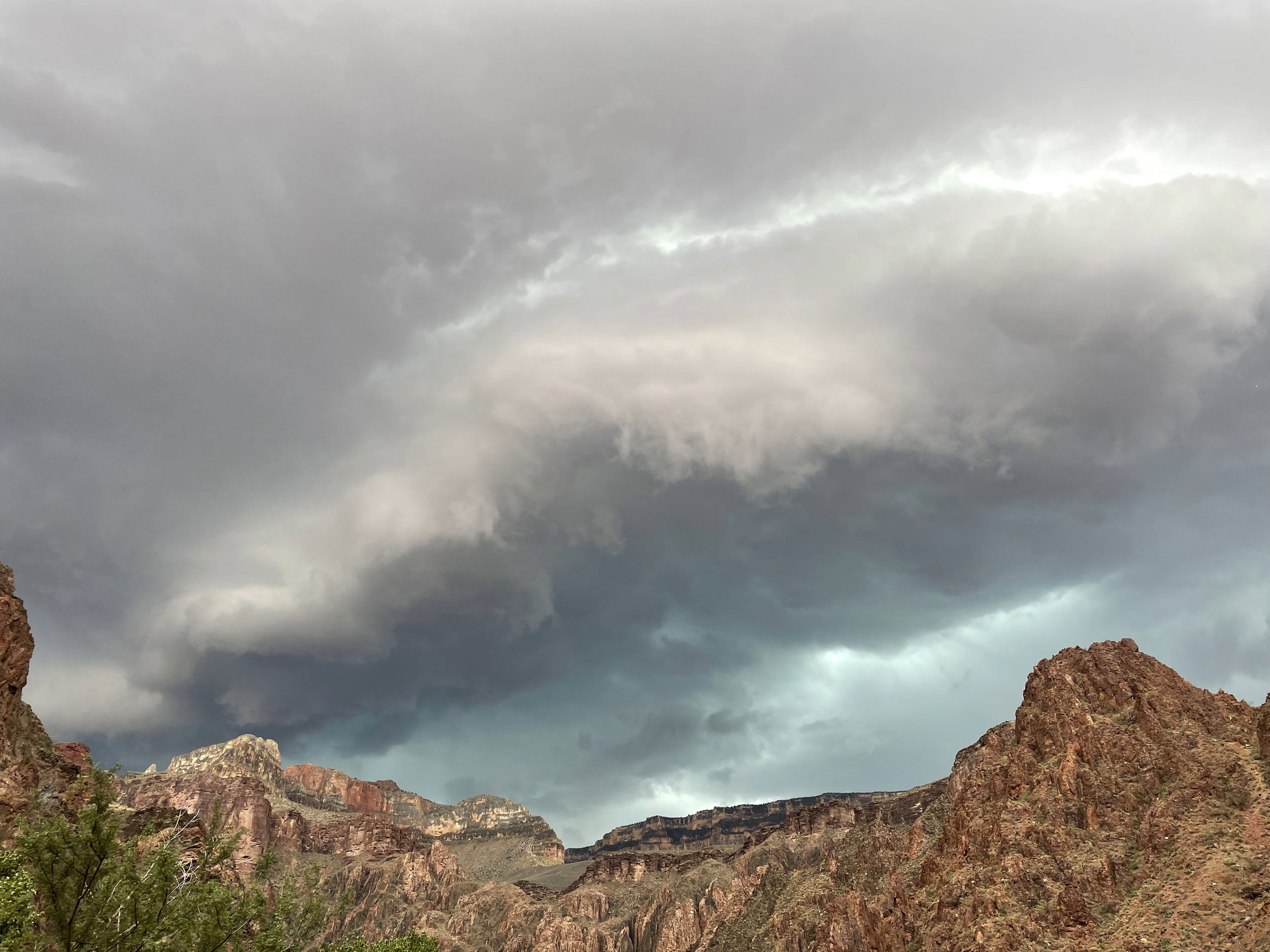
Storm clouds over the canyon at 2:14 p.m. August 29, 2026

The flood occurred during the North American monsoon season, a time when moisture from the Gulf of California and other warm waters flows over the typically dry Southwestern United States. The summer of 2026 was particularly wet due to the convergence of various environmental conditions, including a strong El Niño, a marine heatwave, and ongoing climate change, resulting in moisture levels being 5-15% higher than average across the Western United States. In addition, moisture from the remnants of Tropical Storm Iselle further increased the potential for heavy rainfall in the area.

Hours before the flood, two storm systems and four successive waves of rainfall arose over two creek drainages in the North Rim of the Grand Canyon, with rains of up to one inch per hour being observed. Previously in 2025, the North Rim was consumed by the Dragon Bravo Fire, which burned away vegetation and scorched the land into an impermeable, clay-like surface unsuitable for water. At approximately 2:30 p.m. MST, the downpour had intensified to five inches per hour. The heavy rainfall combined with the steep, rocky canyon terrain caused water to funnel down into Bright Angel Creek, causing water levels to rise over five feet in 10 minutes.

== Flood ==
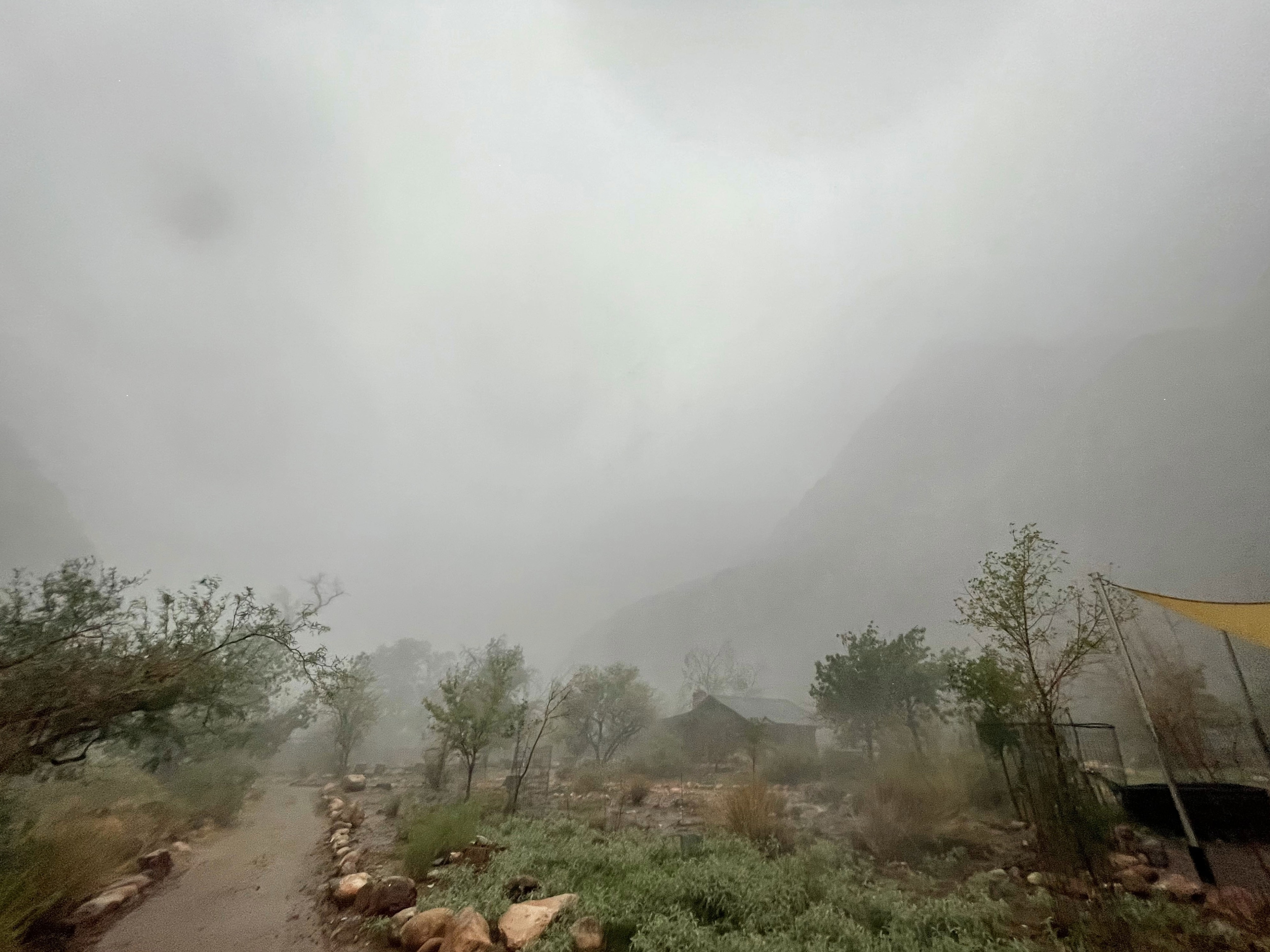
Phantom Ranch around the start of the flash flood, 2:22 p.m. August 29, 2026.

As heavy rain impacted the canyon, the National Weather Service warned park officials of the risk of flash flooding in the area. At around 12:23 p.m., the National Park Service transmitted the warning to people in the canyon through an alert system, issuing a total of six alerts. Around the start of the flood, four river gauges installed at Bright Angel Creek after the Dragon Bravo Fire notified rangers about the rising water levels, but two were washed away after the flood picked up speed.

Ash, logs, and other remnants from the Dragon Bravo Fire burn scar were carried down along with sediment and mud, turning the water almost black. The increased density of the floodwaters allowed it to sweep away much heavier obstacles than fresh water.

Over 80 people became trapped in the canyon due to the flood. Visitors in the area variously described witnessing heavy rainfall, cliffs cascading with waterfalls, the creek overflowing, 15-foot tall floodwaters, and buildings and construction vehicles being washed away. The flood also incited several secondary hazards including rockfalls, landslides, and mudslides.

== Impact ==
=== Victims ===
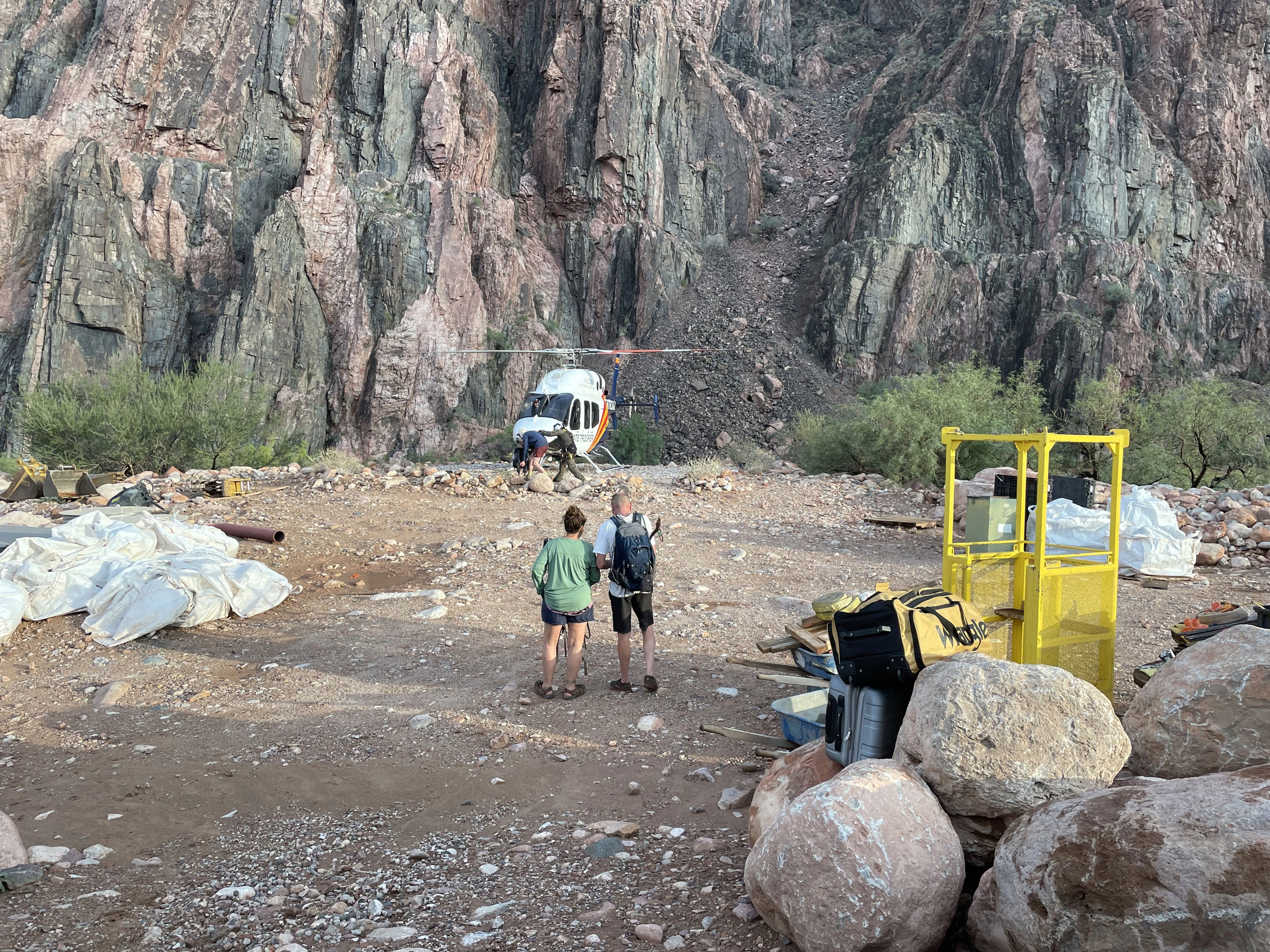
Individuals being evacuated around 6 p.m. on August 29, 2026.

Border Patrol Search, Trauma, and Rescue and Arizona Department of Public Safety operations

From August 29 to 30, National Park Services and Arizona Department of Public Safety performed 13 helicopter flights, rescuing 62 people and evacuating them to Maswik Lodge with assistance from the American Red Cross, while 15 people were reported missing. After rescue operations, 82 people were rescued while 3 people remained missing.

On August 30 and 31, the corpses of John Giusti and Brent Rosenkranz were discovered dozens of miles downstream by commercial boating expeditions. On 26 August, Giusti and Rosenkranz embarked on a camping trip at the bottom of the Grand Canyon with their friend Timothy Allen Smith. After the flood, all three were reported missing by family members. Border Patrol Search, Trauma, and Rescue and Coconino County Search and Rescue Team joined in the search for Smith, using search and rescue dogs, Bluetooth tracking devices, and drones. On September 15, Smith's remains were found in the Colorado River.

=== Damage ===
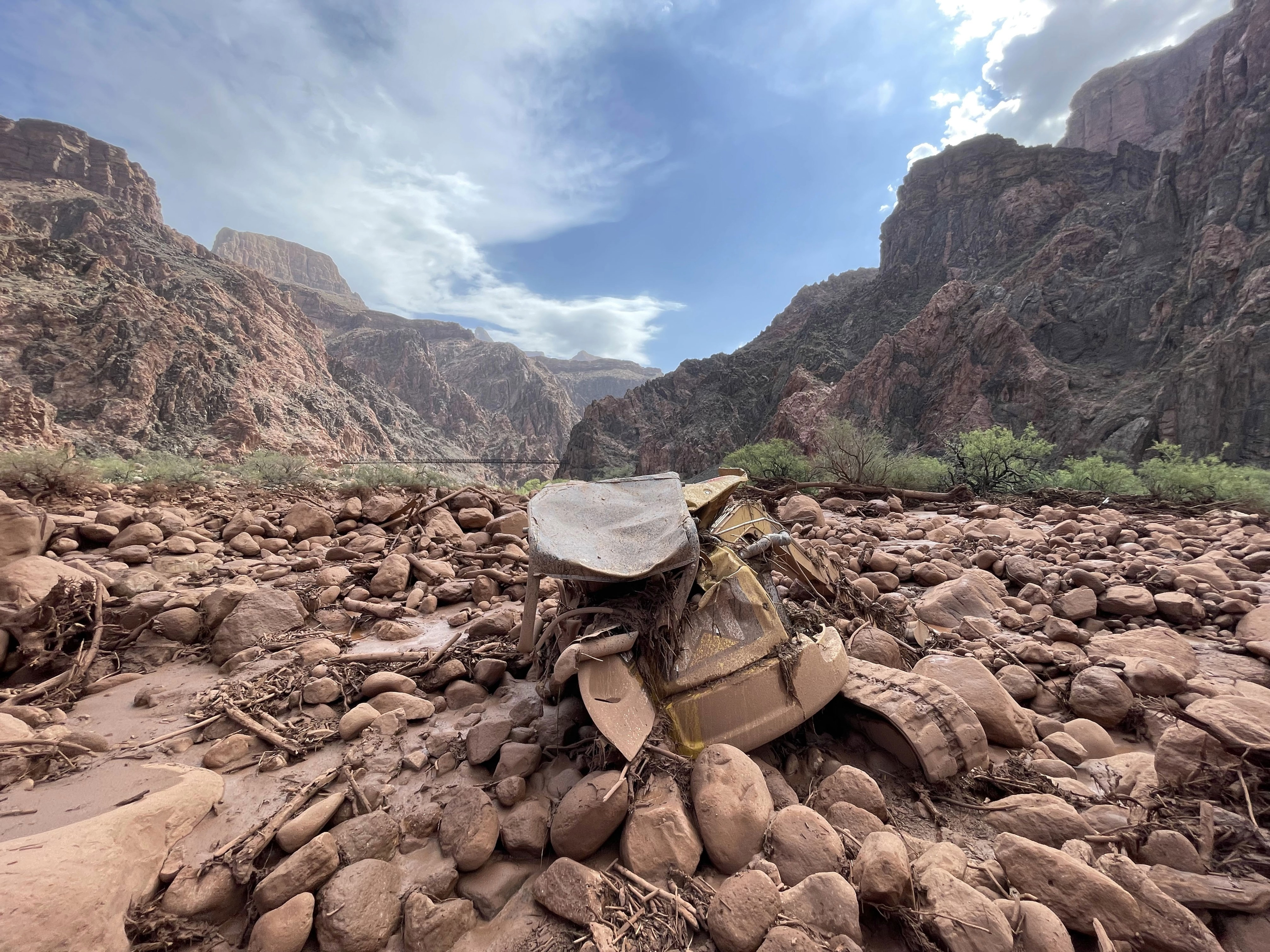
Excavator washed away during the flash flood

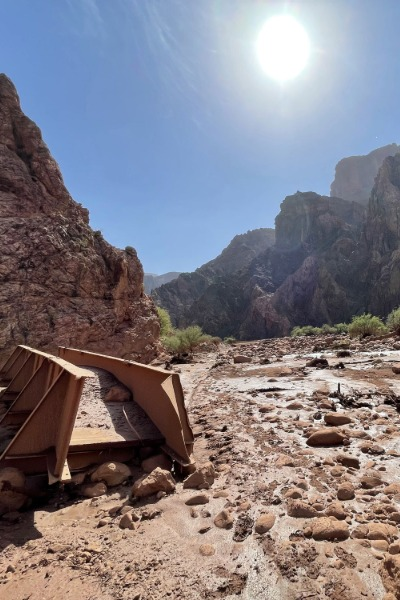
Pieces of a footbridge along Bright Angel Creek

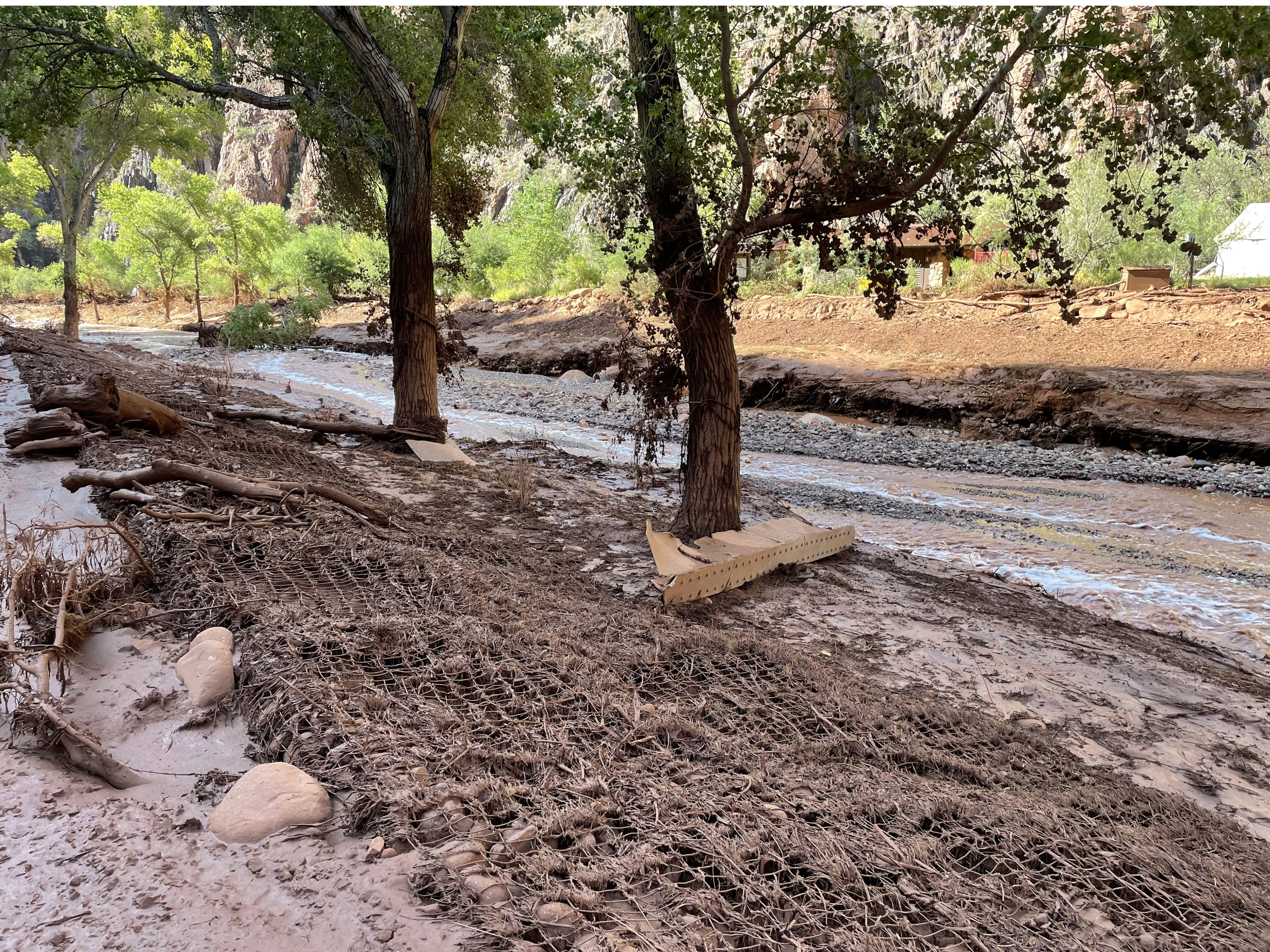
Washed out trail along Bright Angel Creek. Wreckage and erosion from flooding is present in the creek.

Floodwaters destroyed significant portions of park infrastructure in the Phantom Ranch area. While Phantom Ranch itself was unharmed, trails and footbridges, temporary contractor housing, utility buildings, facilities, pipes, and other infrastructure in the Bright Angel Creek drainage were damaged or destroyed. The old and dilapidated Transcanyon Waterline, the only water pipeline that transports water to millions of visitors and about 2,500 residents of Grand Canyon Village on the South Rim, was intensively damaged, disrupting a $208 million replacement. Preliminary assessments by park officials found that approximately 40% of the 12.5-mile (20 km) pipeline suffered damaging or was destroyed. Due to the damaged water pipeline, there was reportedly only "two to three weeks’ worth of water supply left". Park officials implemented Stage 4 water restrictions on August 31, only permitting dry camping, prohibiting all fires on campgrounds in the South Rim, cancelling overnight stays at park hotels and lodges, and advising residents to limit water use to hygiene and sanitation purposes. To conserve water, water rations were given at distribution facilities, offices in the affected area were relocated, standard toilets were replaced with portable toilets, and washable dinnerware was replaced with disposable dinnerware. Forecasted rains and thunderstorms threatened to obstruct repair efforts.

The flood majorly reshaped the surrounding landscape, causing erosion, widening creek beds, extending a river rapid, and forming new river rapids. Many sections of the park in the affected area were closed indefinitely by park administrators due to significant damage and significant amounts of debris. River traffic along the Colorado River was briefly prohibited due to risks posed by massive boulders, debris, and metal structures which were introduced into the river by the flood.

== Reactions ==
The National Weather Service issued a flash flood watch due to additional rain and thunderstorms forecasted to continue into September, risking a second flood due to the already saturated soil and monsoonal moisture.

On August 30, governor of Arizona Katie Hobbs expressed condolences on X, posting, "My heart is with the families and loved ones of every person unaccounted for after the flash flooding at the Grand Canyon." She also confirmed that rescue efforts were underway.
