= Transcanyon Waterline =

Water pipeline at the Grand Canyon

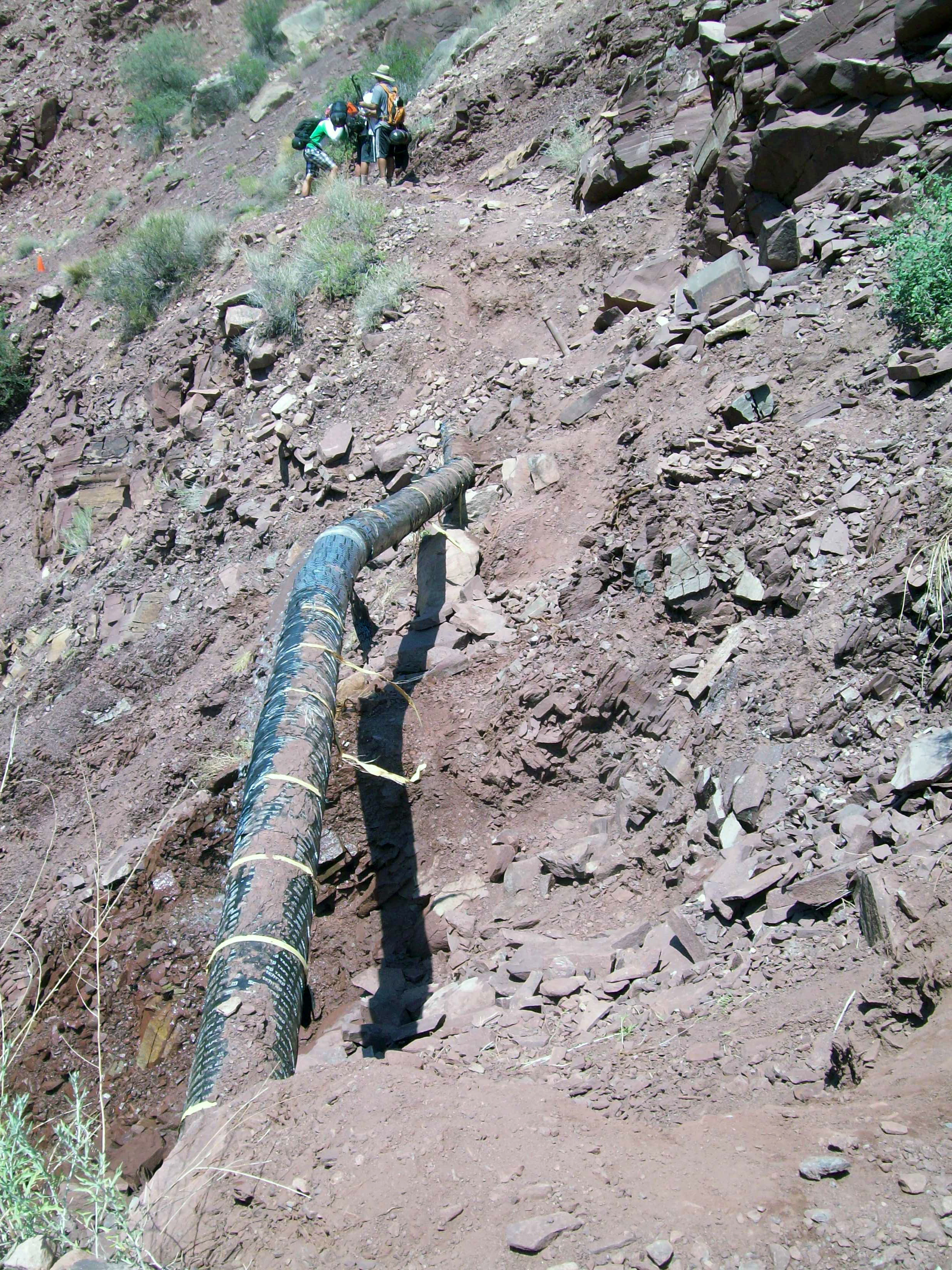
- Exposed section of the Transcanyon Waterline

Location
- Country: United States
- State: Arizona
- Start: Roaring Springs
- To: Havasupai Gardens

General information
- Type: water
- Status: Partially destroyed
- Construction started: 1965

Technical information
- Length: 20 km (12 mi)

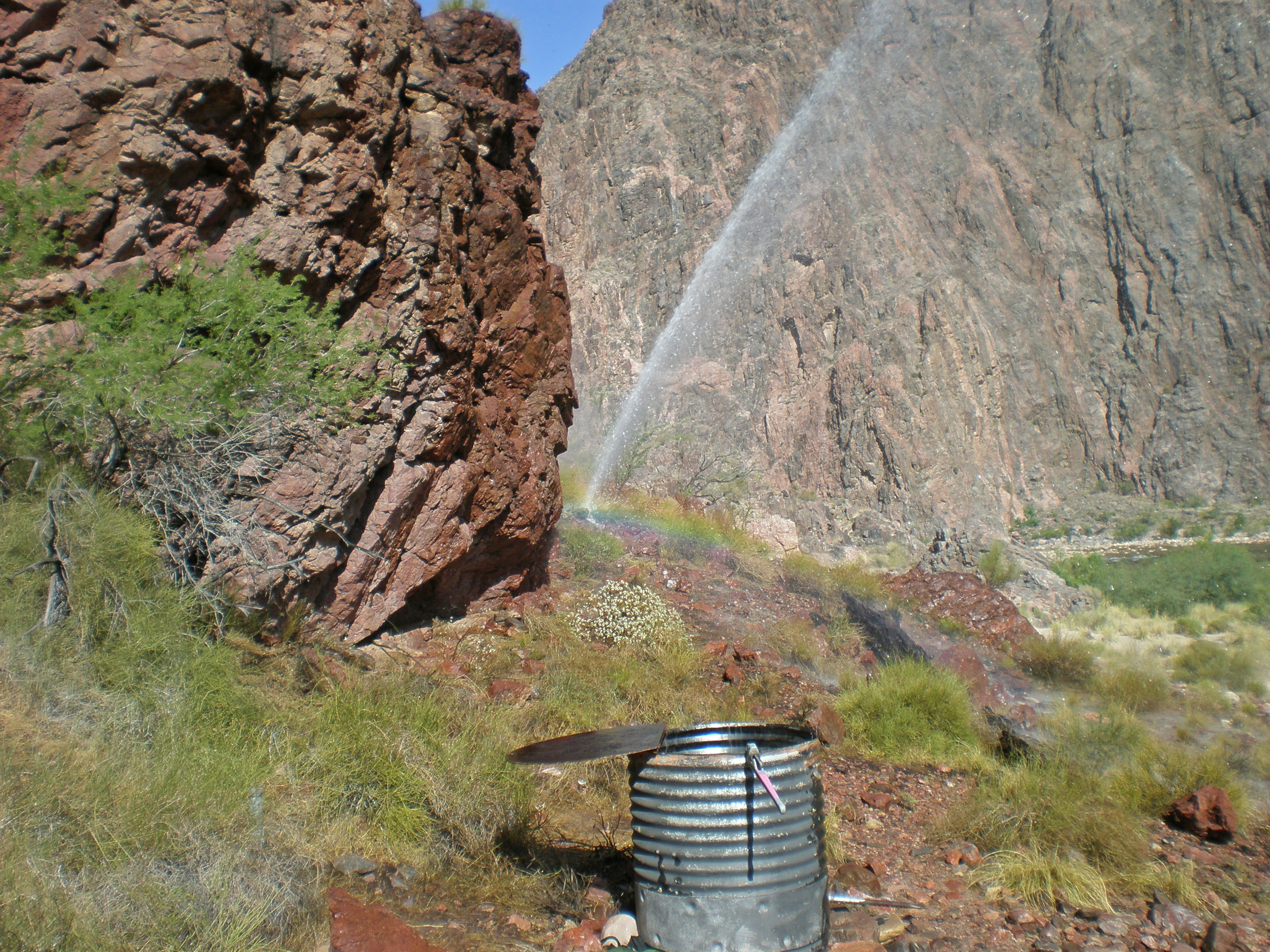
Rainbow visible from water spraying from a break in the Transcanyon Waterline along the North Kaibab Trail.

The Transcanyon Water Distribution Pipeline, also known as the Transcanyon Waterline (TCWL), is a 12.5-mile (20 km) water pipeline in Grand Canyon National Park, Arizona. Water is sent from the Roaring Springs pumphouse on the North Rim of the Grand Canyon, across the Colorado River at Silver Bridge and then to Havasupai Gardens on the South Rim.

Construction began in 1965 and was completed in 1970. It is the only pipeline to the South Rim and provides water and fire suppression for hundreds of buildings and millions of visitors to the South Rim and inner canyon, and around 2,500 residents of Grand Canyon Village.

The Transcanyon Waterline has failed many times in history. Due to its age and exposure, the pipeline is subjected to frequent damaging. Repairs are usually expensive due to the pipeline's position deep within the canyon, requiring helicopters to access.

In 2023, the Transcanyon Waterline entered a $208 million project to replace the decrepit pipeline.

On 29 August 2026, the pipeline suffered extensive damaging from the 2026 Grand Canyon flood, with 40% of the pipeline being damaged or destroyed, leaving it nonoperational. The damage caused National Park Services to issue Stage 4 water restrictions on 31 August, only permitting dry camping, prohibiting all fires on campgrounds in the South Rim, cancelling overnight stays at park hotels and lodges, and advising residents to strictly conserve water resources for hygiene and sanitation. Repair efforts were threatened by forecasted stormy weather.
