= 2016 United Nations Security Council election =

Election to the United Nations Security Council

- 28 June 2016

5 of 10 non-permanent seats on the United Nations Security Council
- United Nations Security Council membership after the election Permanent members Non-permanent members
- Outgoing members Angola (Africa) Malaysia (Asia–Pacific) Venezuela (GRULAC) New Zealand (WEOG) Spain (WEOG) Elected members Ethiopia (Africa) Kazakhstan (Asia–Pacific) Bolivia (GRULAC) Sweden (WEOG) Italy (WEOG)

- Unsuccessful candidate
- Thailand (Asia-Pacific)

The 2016 United Nations Security Council election was held on 28 June during the 70th session of the United Nations General Assembly, held at United Nations Headquarters in New York City. The elections were for five non-permanent seats on the UN Security Council for two-year mandates commencing on 1 January 2017. In accordance with the Security Council's rotation rules, whereby the ten non-permanent UNSC seats rotate among the various regional blocs into which UN member states traditionally divide themselves for voting and representation purposes, the five available seats were allocated as follows:

- One for the African Group
- One for the Asia-Pacific Group
- One for the Latin American and Caribbean Group
- Two for the Western European and Others Group

The five members served on the Security Council for the 2017–18 period.

This was the first time a Security Council election was held in the month of June. On 18 September 2014, the General Assembly adopted Resolution 68/307 to push the elections back to six months prior to the beginning of the newly elected Council members' terms. Moreover, this was the first election of Kazakhstan to the Council.

== Candidates ==
=== African Group ===
- Ethiopia
- Kenya — Withdrew in January 2016 at the African Union summit in favour of Ethiopia.
- Seychelles — Withdrew on 16 January 2016 in favour of Ethiopia.

=== Asia-Pacific Group ===
- Kazakhstan
- Thailand

=== Latin American and Caribbean Group ===
- Bolivia

=== Western European and Others Group ===
- Italy
- Netherlands
- Sweden

== Support ==
William Courtney, the former U.S. Ambassador to Kazakhstan, said that "based on the solid successes of Kazakhstan to establish CICA, Chairmanship of the OSCE and the Organization of Islamic Cooperation, Kazakhstan, like no other country, deserves special trust and is a suitable candidate for a non-permanent member of the UN Security Council."

== Public debate ==
In May 2016, the World Federation of United Nations Associations hosted the first open debates for UN Member States competing for a seat as a non-permanent member to the Security Council. All five contenders participated in the debate.

== Result ==
=== African and Asia-Pacific Groups ===
African and Asia-Pacific Groups election results
Member	Round 1	Round 2
Ethiopia	185	—
Kazakhstan	113	138
Thailand	77	55
valid ballots	192	193
invalid ballots	1	0
abstentions	2	0
present and voting	190	193
required majority	127	129

Kazakhstan became the first Central Asian country to sit on the UNSC.

=== Latin American and Caribbean Group ===
Latin American and Caribbean Group election results
Member	Round 1
Bolivia	183
Colombia	1
Cuba	1
valid ballots	193
abstentions	8
present and voting	185
required majority	124

=== Western European and Other Group ===
==== Day 1 ====
Western European and Others Group election results
Member	Round 1	Round 2	Round 3	Round 4	Round 5
Sweden	134	—	—	—	—
Netherlands	125	99	96	96	95
Italy	113	92	94	95	95
Belgium	1	—	—	—	—
valid ballots	193	193	193	193	192
invalid ballots	0	0	0	0	1
abstentions	2	2	3	2	2
present and voting	191	191	190	191	190
required majority	128	128	127	128	127

Following five rounds of inconclusive voting, Bert Koenders and Paolo Gentiloni, Foreign Ministers of the Netherlands and Italy respectively, announced a proposal whereby the Netherlands and Italy would split the two-year term with each country serving one year. Such arrangements were relatively common in deadlocked elections starting in the late 1950s until 1966, when the Security Council was enlarged. This however would be the first time in over five decades that two members agreed to split a term; intractable deadlocks have instead usually been resolved by the candidate countries withdrawing in favor of a third member state.

==== Day 2 ====
Western European and Others Group election results
Member	Round 1
Italy	179
Netherlands	4
San Marino	1
valid ballots	190
invalid ballots	2
abstentions	6
present and voting	184
required majority	123

== See also ==
- List of members of the United Nations Security Council
- European Union and the United Nations
