= Seventieth session of the United Nations General Assembly =

- 15 September 2015 – 13 September 2016 70th session 70th general debate
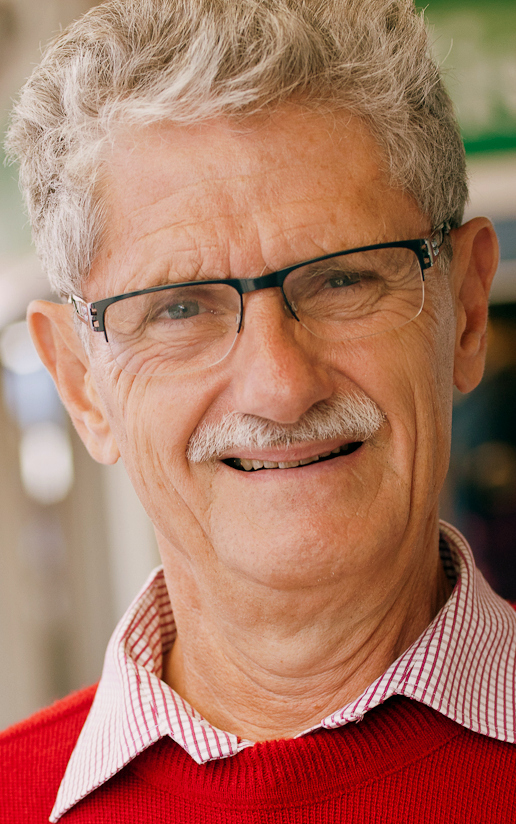
- President of the 70th General Assembly; Mogens Lykketoft
- Host country: United Nations
- Cities: New York City
- Venues: General Assembly Hall at the United Nations Headquarters
- Participants: Member States of the United Nations
- Secretary-General: Ban Ki-moon
- Website: www.un.org/en/ga/

The 70th session of the United Nations General Assembly opened on 15 September 2015. The president of the United Nations General Assembly was from the Western European and Others Group.

== Organisation for the session ==
Danish parliamentary speaker Mogens Lykketoft was chosen as the consensus candidate of WEOG to preside over the assembly. His goals were formulating a Post-2015 Development Agenda as "sustainable development goals," in particular environmental sustainability. He said "Things have changed in the past 15 years. We are no longer just fighting extreme poverty brought about by a lack of public services. We are fighting against a new form of poverty, one caused by the unsustainable path of development that we, as a species, have chosen to embark on. The consensus is that it is impossible to continue without endangering not just ourselves, but future generations as well." Amongst these goals included the end of year United Nations Climate Change Conference, or COP21.

As is tradition during each session of the General Assembly, Secretary-General Ban Ki-moon drew lots to see which member state would take the helm at the first seat in the General Assembly Chamber, with the other member states following according to the English translation of their name, the same order would be followed in the six main committees. For this session, Tuvalu was drawn to take up the first seat in the chamber.

The Chairmen and officers of the six gain committees were also elected: First Committee (Disarmament and International Security Committee); Second Committee (Economic and Financial Committee); Third Committee (Social, Humanitarian and Cultural Committee); Fourth Committee (Special Political and Decolonization Committee); Fifth Committee (Administrative and Budgetary Committee); and the Sixth Committee (Legal Committee).

There was also nineteen vice-presidents of the UNGA.

=== General debate ===
Most states had a representative speaking about issues concerning their country and the hopes for the coming year as to what the UNGA will do. This is an opportunity for the member states to opine on international issues of their concern. The General Debate will occur from 28 September-3 October, with the exception of the intervening Sunday.

The order of speakers was given first to member states, then observer states and supranational bodies. Any other observers entities had a chance to speak at the end of the debate, if they so choose. Speakers had been be put on the list in the order of their request, with special consideration for ministers and other government officials of similar or higher rank. According to the rules in place for the General Debate, the statements should be in one of the United Nations official languages of Arabic, Chinese, English, French, Russian or Spanish, and will be translated by the United Nations translators. Each speaker is requested to provide 20 advance copies of their statements to the conference officers to facilitate translation and to be presented at the podium. Speeches are requested to be limited to five minutes, with seven minutes for supranational bodies. President Mogens Lykketoft chose the theme of the debate as "The United Nations at 70: the road ahead for peace, security and human rights."

== Resolutions ==
Transforming our world: the 2030 Agenda for Sustainable Development (UN Resolution A/RES/70/1), containing the goals (October 2015).

Resolutions came before the UNGA between October 2015 and summer 2016.

== Elections ==
The election of non-permanent members to the Security Council for 2016–2017 was held on 15 October 2015, in which Egypt, Senegal, Uruguay, Japan, and Ukraine were elected to replace outgoing members Chad, Nigeria, Chile, Jordan, and Lithuania, respectively. The election of non-permanent members for 2017–2018 will also occur in this session of the General Assembly, per Resolution 68/307, which changed the Security Council election cycle from October to June. The election of non-permanent members to the Security Council for 2017–2018 was held on 28 June 2016, in which Angola, Malaysia, Venezuela, New Zealand and Spain were replaced by Ethiopia, Kazakhstan, Bolivia, Sweden and Italy/Netherlands (who agreed to split the term over one year each with Italy starting first).

An election to choose 18 members of the United Nations Human Rights Council for a three-year term took place.

During the session, India hosted a summit of G-4 leaders in New York where the main agenda was UNSC reforms. The UN General Assembly finally adopted a document, after over 20 years, that would form the basis of formal discussions on this matter.

== See also ==
- List of UN General Assembly sessions
- List of General debates of the United Nations General Assembly
