= Keita Department =

Coordinates: 14°45′32″N 5°46′29″E

Keita
- Department
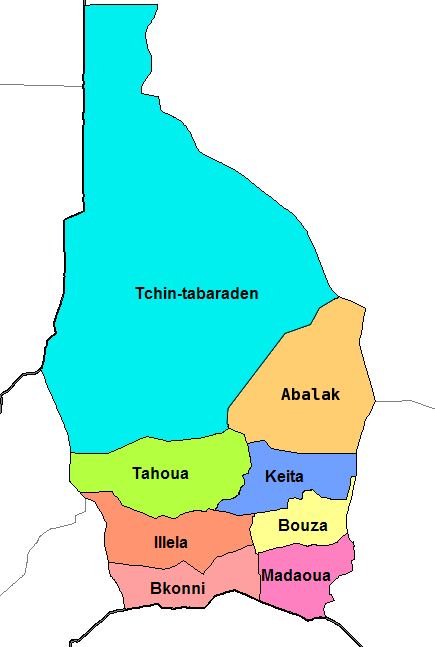
- Keita Department location in the region
- Country: Niger
- Region: Tahoua Region
- Departmental seat: Keita

Area
  - Total: 1,385 sq mi (3,588 km^{2})

Population (2012)
  - Total: 337,098
  - Density: 243.3/sq mi (93.95/km^{2})
- Time zone: UTC+1 (GMT 1)

Keita is a department of the Tahoua Region in Niger. Its capital lies at the city of Keita. The Keita Department is located in the centre of the Republic of Niger and covers an area of more than 4,860 km2 characterised by plateaux with rocky slopes and valleys forming a complex system of watersheds exposed to strong winds and water erosion. The sahelian climate with an average temperature about of 29 °C, a short rainy season (June - September) and a yearly average rainfall between 400 and 500 mm, represents one of the most limiting factors.

Between 1960 and 1990, a decrease of yearly average rainfall was observed particularly during the month of August, with a latitude shift of 30 km from Northeast to Southwest.

The decade between the two last great dryness in 1973 and 1984 represents a line of demarcation between two different environmental and socio-economic systems. A negative synergistic process, which seemed irrepressible, struck the ecosystem bringing it close to the break point: crop productions dropped down and herds were decimated. In 1984 the area seemed directed to become again a lower density population zone as it was at the beginning of the century and without future.

The Keita valley has always represented a border for the Sahara desert, allowing the development of a multiethnic community composed of peasants coming from Southern regions and nomads from the North. The total population increased from 65,000 inhabitants in 1962 to 230,000 in 2003.

Since 1984 the keita Departement operates the Keita Integrated Development Project (Programme de Développement Rural dans l'Ader Doutchi Maggia) financed by the Italian Cooperation.

As of 2012, the department had a total population of 337,098 people.

== Communes ==
- Garhanga
- Ibrohamane
- Keita
- Tamaske
