= Tamaske =

- Commune and village
- Location in Niger
- Coordinates: 14°49′N 5°39′E
- Country: Niger
- Region: Tahoua Region
- Department: Keita Department

Population (2012)
  - Total: 111,358
- Time zone: UTC+1 (WAT)

Tamaske is a city and rural commune in Niger. It is located in the Keita Department, in the Tahoua Region.

== Geography ==
Tamaske lies in the Sahel biome in Niger. The neighboring municipalities are Kalfou in the northwest, Keita in the northeast, Garhanga in the southeast and Badaguichiri in the south. The municipality is divided into 42 administrative villages, 41 villages and two camps.

== History ==
Upon arrival of the first French military expedition in 1900 Tamaske was already a large Hausa settlement. In 1901, the French established a military post in the community. The market of Tamaske was one of the most important markets in the region that have been approved at the beginning of the 20th century by the French administration. In 1913, Tamaske was dissolved as a separate canton and merged with the canton of Keita. Trade suffered at the beginning of World War I, and the Hausa clashed with the nearby Tuareg.

In 1988, Tamaske received the status of a commune together with twelve other villages nearby. This can be attributed to its large size and the economic weight of the Hausa inhabitants, who secured the administrative functions of a commune. Tamaske was hit by a cholera outbreak in October 2014.

== Demographics ==
In the 2001 census, Tamaské had 67,486 residents. The population had increased to 111,358 by the 2012 census. Of that, 54,349 were male and 57,009 were female. The rapid growth of the commune has placed burdens of traditional land use patterns.

== Culture and landmarks ==
A large mosque in the Iraqi style was built in Tamaske in 1979. The construction was financed by Hausa merchants from Tamaske, who had emigrated to Nigeria.

== Economy and infrastructure ==
Tamaske is a main center of commerce in the Tahoua Region. However, agriculture is the principal occupation, as the soil is rich for planting. In 2010, a trading center for onions was established. The region is well known for its onion cultivation.

Tamaske located on the National Road 16. The community is home to one of three tanneries in the Tahoua region. The other two are in the regional capital Tahoua and in the rural commune of Galma Koudawatche.
