= Keita (given name) =

Keita (written: 慶太, 敬太, 圭太 or 渓太) is a masculine Japanese given name. Notable people with the name include:

- Keita Amemiya (born 1959), Japanese anime director
- Keita Asama (born 1984), Japanese baseball player
- Keita Endo (遠藤 渓太, born 1997), Japanese footballer
- Keita Gotō (1882–1959), Japanese industrialist
- Keita Hidaka (日髙 慶太, born 1990), Japanese footballer
- Keita Inoue, Japanese shogi player
- Keita Isozaki (born 1980), Japanese footballer
- Keita Kadokura (門倉 啓太, born 1987), Japanese shogi player
- Keita Kushimaumi (real name Keita Kushima) (born 1965), Japanese sumo wrestler and coach
- Keita Machida (町田 啓太, born 1990), Japanese actor
- Keita Masuda (born 1979), Japanese badminton player
- Keita Nakamura (中村 K太郎, born 1984), Japanese mixed martial artist
- Keita Nakamura (footballer) (中村 慶太, born 1993), Japanese footballer
- Keita Sano, Japanese baseball player
- Keita Satoh (curler) (佐藤 恵大), Japanese curler
- Keita Soraoka (born 1971), Japanese former Olympic swimmer
- Keita Sugimoto (born 1982), Japanese footballer
- Keita Suzuki (born 1981), Japanese footballer
- Keita Tachibana (born 1985), Japanese musician (w-inds.)
- Keita Takahashi (born 1974 or 1975), Japanese video game director
- Keita Terazono (born 2001), Japanese singer, dancer and rapper, member of the South Korean boy bands Ciipher and Evnne
- Keita Watanabe (渡辺 啓太, born 1992), Japanese speed skater
- Keita Yano (born 1988), Japanese professional wrestler

== Other people ==
- Keita Baldé (born 1995), Senegalese footballer
- Keita Mandjou (born 1979), Guinean footballer
- Keita Meretana (real name Keith Mildon) (born 1932 or 1933), New Zealand former wrestler

== Fictional characters ==
- Keita Amano, protagonist of the Japanese video game and anime series Yo-kai Watch (known as Nate Adams in English).
- Keita Amano, protagonist of the Japanese light novel series Gamers!
- Keita Iijima, character in the Battle Royale novel, film and manga series.
- Keita Midorikawa, character in the anime series Smile PreCure! (known as Calvin Swanson in English).
- Keita Mori, character in the book The Watchmaker of Filigree Street by Natasha Pulley
- Keita Suminoe, protagonist of Japanese manga and anime series Kiss x Sis.
