= Water transportation =

Intentional movement of water over large distances

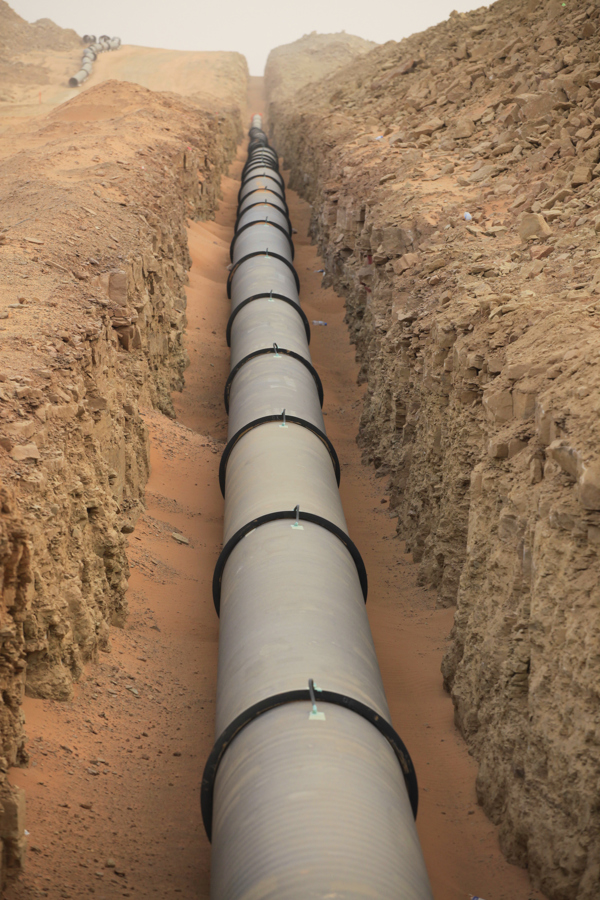
Water pipeline in Jordan

Water transportation is the international movement of water over large distances. Methods of transportation fall into three categories:

- Aqueducts, which include pipelines, canals, tunnels and bridges
- Container shipment, which includes transport by tank truck, tank car, and tank ship.
- Towing, where a tugboat is used to pull an iceberg or a large water bag along behind it.

Due to its weight, the transportation of water is very energy-intensive. Unless it has the assistance of gravity, a canal or long-distance pipeline needs pumping stations at regular intervals. In this regard, the lower friction levels of the canal make it a more economical solution than the pipeline. Water transportation is also very common in rivers and oceans.

== Major projects ==
The Grand Canal of China, completed in the 7th century AD and measuring 1,794 kilometres (1,115 mi).

The California Aqueduct, near Sacramento, is 715 km (444 mi) long.

The Great Manmade River is a vast underground network of pipes 1,600 km (990 mi) in the Sahara desert, transporting water from an immense aquifer to the largest cities in the region.

The Keita Integrated Development Project used specially created plows called the donaldo and Scarabeo to build water catchments. In these catchments, trees were planted which grow on the water flowing through the ditches.

The Kimberley Water Source Project is currently under way in Australia to determine the best method of transporting water from the Fitzroy River to the city of Perth. Options being considered include a 3,700-kilometre canal, a pipeline of at least 1,800 kilometres, tankers of 300,000 to 500,000 tonnes, and water bags each carrying between 0.5 and 1.5 gigalitres.

The Goldfields Pipeline built in Western Australia in 1903 was the longest pipeline of its day, at 597 kilometres. It supplies water from Perth to the gold mining centre of Kalgoorlie.

== Manual water transportation ==
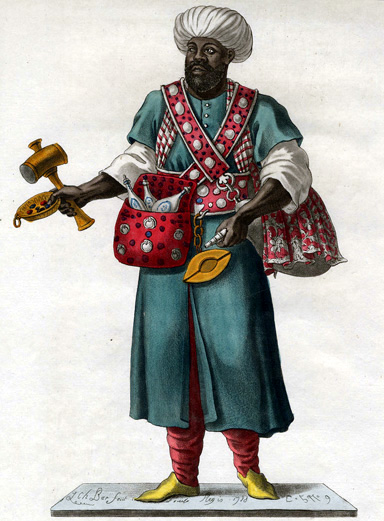
Sakka of Mecca, 1779

Historically water was transported by hand in dry countries, by traditional waterers such as the Sakkas of Arabia and Bhishti of India. Africa is another area where water is often transported by hand, especially in rural areas.

== See also ==
- Pipeline#Water
- Water export
- Water management
- Water supply
