= Indonesia–Solomon Islands relations =

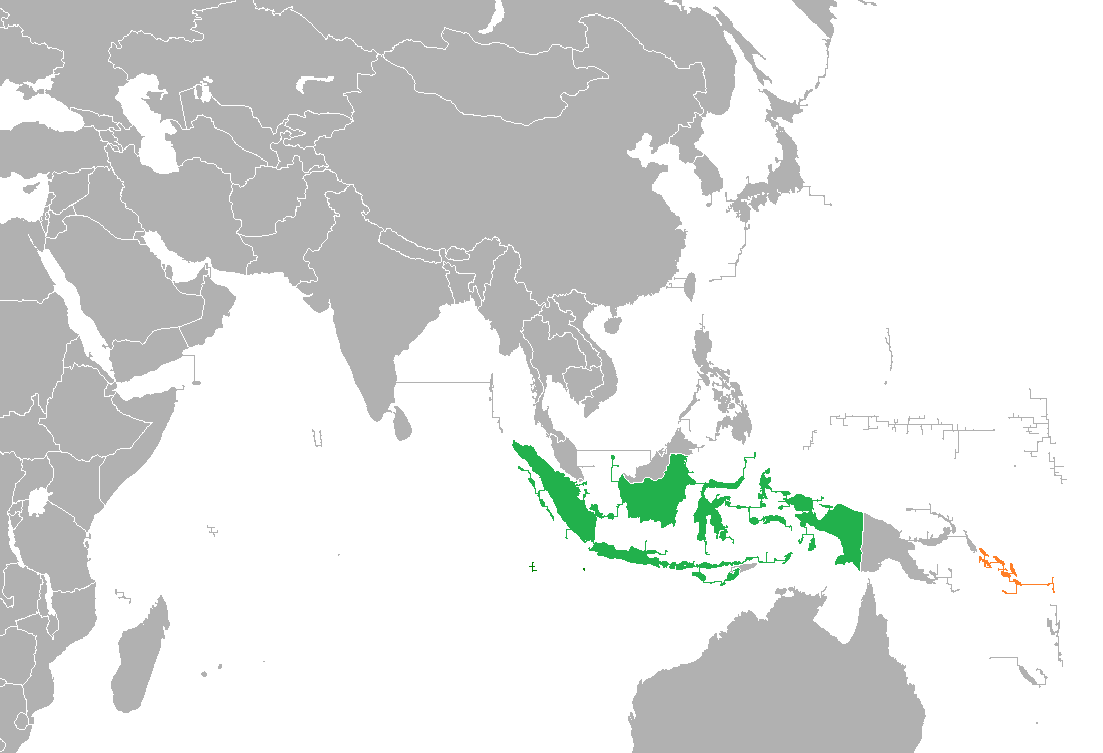

- Indonesia: Solomon Islands

Indonesia–Solomon Islands relations refer to foreign relations between Indonesia and the Solomon Islands. The Solomon Islands has opened their embassy in Jakarta since August 2014 with Gladys Kamia Isihanua appointed as ambassador in 2025, while the Indonesian embassy in Port Moresby is accredited to the Solomon Islands. Indonesia is a gateway for Pacific countries to enter the ASEAN and Asian region, while it wishes to increase its influence in the Pacific Islands region. Both countries are the members of the Melanesian Spearhead Group (MSG) where Indonesia is labeled as an observer state.

== High level visits ==
- Solomon Prime Minister Gordon Darcy Lilo visited Indonesia in August 2013.
- Solomon Prime Minister Jeremiah Manele visited Indonesia in October 2024 on the occasion of the Inauguration of Indonesian President Prabowo Subianto.

== Cooperation ==
On 23 June 2025, Indonesian Deputy Foreign Minister Arrmanatha Nasir reiterated Indonesia's commitment to enhancing bilateral cooperation with Pacific nations for mutual prosperity and solidarity in addressing global challenges. In a meeting with Solomon Islands Foreign Minister Peter Agovaka, they explored joint initiatives to improve trade and maritime sector cooperation.

== Economic relations ==
Bilateral trade relations saw an average annual increase of 17.28 percent. In 2012, the trade volume was at $15.88 million, with Indonesia posting a $9.1 million surplus. The Solomon Islands also works with Indonesia in the fields of energy, fishing, development, media and culture.

== Issues ==
In 2016, bilateral relations worsen as during a United Nations General Assembly, Solomon Prime Minister Manasseh Sogavare alleged the human rights violations in the Indonesian provinces of Papua and West Papua, while also pushing for the independence of the said provinces. The Solomon Islands addressed this issue together with Vanuatu, Nauru, the Marshall Islands, Tuvalu and Tonga. Indonesia strongly rejected this accusation and accused these countries of interfering with its domestic affairs and Indonesia's national sovereignty. Indonesia saw this statement as politically motivated to support separatist groups notorious for its terrorist attacks. Indonesia in turn slams Solomon Islands and Vanuatu on their own domestic human rights problems.

== See also ==
- Foreign relations of Indonesia
- Foreign relations of Solomon Islands
