= Keita (surname) =

Keita is a surname. The Malian family name is normally written Keïta, sometimes Kéita. Kéïta is a hypercorrection. In reference to non-modern figures, or in anglophone countries such as The Gambia and Liberia the tréma ( ¨ ) or acute accent ( ´ ) is not used. Notable people with the surname include:

== Politics ==
- Aoua Kéita (1912–1980), Malian independence activist and writer
- Bintou Keita (born 1958), UN Diplomat
- Ibrahim Boubacar Keïta (1945–2022), Malian politician
- Karim Keïta (born 1979), Malian politician, son of the above
- Margaret Keita, Gambian politician
- Modibo Keïta (1915–1977), first President of Mali
- Modibo Keita (1942–2021), Malian politician and former Prime Minister
- Sundiata Keita (c. 1217 – c. 1255), founder of the Mali Empire
  - Keita dynasty, ruling dynasty of the Mali Empire

== Entertainment ==
- Balla Moussa Keïta (1934–2001), Malian actor and comedian
- Mamady Keïta (1950–2021), Guinean master drummer
- Mamani Keïta (born 1965), Malian singer
- Salif Keita (born 1949), Malian singer-songwriter
- Seckou Keita (born 1978), Senegalese musician
- Seydou Keïta (1921–2001), Malian self-taught portrait photographer

== Sport ==
- Abdoulaye Keita, Guinean footballer and coach
- Abdoulaye Khouma Keita (born 1978), Senegalese footballer
- Abdul Kader Keïta (born 1981), Ivorian footballer
- Adama Kéïta (born 1990), Malian footballer
- Alhassane Keita (born 1983), Guinean footballer
- Alphousseyni Keita (born 1985), Malian footballer
- Brahima Keita (born 1985), Ivorian footballer
- Brima Keita, Sierra Leonean football manager
- Cheick Keita (born 1996), Malian footballer
- Daba Modibo Keïta (born 1981), Malian Olympic taekwondo athlete
- Fadel Keïta (born 1977), Ivorian footballer
- Fantamady Keita (born 1949), Malian footballer
- Idrissa Keita (born 1977), Ivorian footballer
- Ismaël Keïta (born 1990), Malian footballer
- Karounga Keïta (born 1941), Malian footballer, coach and official
- Ladji Keita, (born 1983), Senegalese footballer
- Mariam Pauline Keita (born 1983), Malian swimmer
- Mohamed Keita (footballer) (born 1991), Guinean footballer
- Muhamed Keita (born 1990), Norwegian footballer
- Naby Keïta (born 1995), Guinean footballer
- Naman Keïta (born 1978), French Olympic track and field athlete
- Nantenin Keïta (born 1984), French Paralympic athlete
- Salif Keïta (born 1946), former Malian footballer
- Salif Keita (born 1975), Senegalese footballer
- Sega Keita (born 1992), Senegalese footballer
- Sekou Keita (born 1979), Liberian former footballer
- Seydou Keita (born 1980), Malian footballer
- Sidi Yaya Keita (born 1985), Malian footballer
- Souleymane Keïta (born 1986), Malian footballer
- Souleymane Keita (born 1987), Senegalese footballer
- Tidjan Keita (born 1996), French-Guinean basketball player in the Israeli Basketball Premier League
