= Aïchatou Boulama Kané =

Nigerien politician (born 1953)

- Born: 24 April 1953 (age 73); Keita, Niger
- Occupation: Politician
- Political party: Nigerien Party for Democracy and Socialism

Aïchatou Boulama Kané (born 24 April 1953) is a Nigerien politician. She served as Minister of Foreign Affairs of Niger and later served as Minister of Planning, both in 2016. Six years later in 2022, she was Niger's ambassador to France.

== Early life and education ==
Kané was born on 24 April 1953 in Keita, Niger. She was the eldest daughter among 16 siblings.

After her primary education at Mainé-Soroa from 1961 to 1967, Kané attended the Lycée Mariama in Niamey where she earned a Baccalauréat série D in 1974. She pursued higher education in France at the University of Rennes 1, earning an economics degree in 1979, and later studied at the Pantheon-Sorbonne University, earning a diploma of Specialized Studies.

== Career ==
Kané returned to Niger in 1983 and worked for the Ministry of Mines, Industry and Artisans.

Kané led an important march protesting against the low representation of women in the National Conference, for which 13 May is celebrated as Nigerien Women Day. In 1991, she was elected to the National Sovereign Conference as a member of the Nigerien Party for Democracy and Socialism. She was named Secretary of State for Planning in 1993, and fought for the upwards mobility of African women. In particular, she promoted female empowerment through the development of its activities, including crafts. Her appointment as Coordinator of the International Exhibition of Crafts for Women (SAFEM) in 2000 illustrated her efforts in women's crafts. It became a government agency in 2005 but has been independent since 2007.

Kané was appointed Governor of Niamey by the Council of Ministers in 2011. She served in this position for two years before joining the Interior Ministry.

Kané was Minister of Foreign Affairs for a few months in 2016. She was appointed by the President, Mahamadou Issoufou, to replace Mohamed Bazoum on 25 February 2015. Kané had previously been Issoufou's chief of staff. As foreign minister, Kané gave a speech to the United Nations supporting the two-state solution in Israel and Palestine and thanked the coalition involved in fighting the terrorist group Boko Haram. Kané supported Niger being involved in the UN sanctioned peace process in Libya, making a speech on the topic in an international conference in December 2015. In February 2016, she helped secure the release of Jocelyn Elliott, an Australian woman who, along with her husband Ken, was kidnapped by Islamic militants in Burkina Faso.

On 11 April 2016, Kané was replaced as foreign minister by Ibrahim Yacouba. She was instead appointed as Minister of Planning and President of the Council of Ministers of AFRISTAT.

She was Niger's ambassador to France having been appointed on 23 September 2021.

In August 2023, after the putschists' coup in Niger, Aïchatou Kané Boulama refused to leave her portfolio as Niger's ambassador to France.

== Other activities ==
- African Development Bank (AfDB), Ex-Officio Member of the Board of Governors (since 2016)
- Islamic Development Bank, Ex-Officio Member of the Board of Governors (since 2016)
- World Bank, Ex-Officio Member of the Board of Governors (since 2016)

== Personal life ==
Kané is married to Kane Souleymane, a presidential adviser, and has three children.

Political offices
| Preceded by Mohamed Bazoum | Foreign Minister of Niger; 2016 | Succeeded by Ibrahim Yacouba |
