= Keita Integrated Development Project =

Coordinates: 14°45′N 5°47′E

Ader Doutchi Maggia Rural Development Project
- Mission statement: To fight against desertification and alleviate poverty
- Commercial?: No
- Type of project: Community development
- Location: Rome, Italy
- Owner: Government of Italy
- Established: 1983
- Funding: 14,128 billion Italian Liras

The Ader Doutchi Maggia Rural Development Project (PDR-ADM), better known as Keita Project, is a development project in Keita Department in central Niger. The Project has taken place in four phases, the first starting in 1983 and the most recent beginning in 2003. It was run initially by the Italian government's Italian Development and Cooperation Bureau, as part of its 'Italian Initiative for the Sahel', with significant help from the United Nations. The fourth phase is being run by the UNDP. As of September 2009, the Project has cost approximately US$88 million, with the majority of funding (US$66 million) coming from the Italian government.

The main objectives of the Keita Project are to increase food security and reverse desertification in the Ader, Doutchi and Maggia valleys of Keita Department, an area which faced environmental collapse from the 1970s; a secondary objective is to thereby to reduce the high rate of migration from this region to Italy. The methods used have included reforestation and land reclamation, building new infrastructure, setting up peasants' associations, and providing technical and financial assistance. The results have been to stop and reverse falls in crop yields and livestock numbers, to cover large areas of marginal land with forest and productive farmland, and to provide new sources of income from the land. However, desertification has continued to some degree and food security has not been fully achieved due to very high population growth.

Because of the large area covered, its duration of three decades and the large amount of data collected, the Keita Project has been the subject of considerable study.

== Background ==
By the early 1980s, Keita Department had suffered considerable loss of forest and agricultural land to the Sahara desert.

== Phases ==
- 1983: A plan is written for the Project
- 1984: First phase of the Project begins
- 2007: A new initiative (Fond Local de Développement de l’Ader Doutchi Maggia, FLD-ADM) starts with the objective of completing existing interventions, funding local investments and transferring the management and property to local institutions and organizations.

== Techniques ==
The PDR-ADM operated in: reclamation of plateaux and abandoned lands in the valleys for agricultural and pastoral purposes, reforestation of slopes, of the koris banks and dunes, creation of wind breaks and forest areas, control of the water flow in the koris by banks consolidation and small dams.

Simultaneously, the Project has also addressed the social and economic development by building schools, medical centers, wells and roads, and providing technical assistance and financial support for the creation of new economic activities.

The main interventions of PDR-ADM from 1984 to 2008 are shown in the table below (MAE – DGCS, 2008):

(Table) PDR-ADM interventions until 2008

INTERVENTIONS	NOTES
Reclamation and Improvement of Agricultural and Pasture Lands, Reforestation and Dune Fixation	34,483 HA
Trees Planted	20,000,000
Road Construction	316 km
Drilled Wells	4
Small Dams	43
Dams	2
Weirs	288
Rural Buildings	28,000 M^{2}

== Environmental monitoring ==
- 1995-1997: the Projet d’Evaluation des Interventions de Conservation et de Récupération de l’Environnement (PEICRE) - Italian Cooperation – builds an Information System on Keita in order to evaluate and to monitor the interventions.
- 1997: Keita is identified by ROSELT (Réseau d’Observatoires et de Surveillance Ecologique à Long Terme) as one of the priority places in Niger for desertification monitoring.
- 1999-2000: realization of an Information System to Sustain Evaluation Analysis and Planning; FAO-Italian Cooperation-CeSIA.
- 2001: launching of Keita Observatory through the Projet d'Appui à la Formation et d'Assistance en Gestion de l’Environnement (PAFAGE) financed by Italian Cooperation .
- 2002: IBIMET-CNR studies in the context of three United Nation major conventions (UNCCD-UNCBD-UNFCCC), about Keita potentiality in the carbon sequestration .
- 2006: Launching of KeitaLAB by IBIMET-CNR , FCS and Politecnico di Torino in collaboration with the PDL-ADM.

Even if the PDR-ADM focused on land management, it has not deeply considered environmental monitoring. Consequently, since 1995, many initiatives have been conceived and begun to address this monitoring deficit. CASE-Ibimet institutions have been involved in Keita for 10 years. Keita has been chosen as a privileged environment in the drylands in order to answer to open problems in the scientific research and development cooperation fields:

- Are climatic changes definitive or are they the expression of cyclic phenomena?
- What kind of pressure can natural resources sustain in these areas? How and in how much time could the pressure be modified?
- What kind of new relationships could be created between man, the economy and the environment in the future?
- Which kinds of techniques are the most appropriate for recovering degraded environmental resources and to preserve those at risk?
- How can this recovery be achieved in an efficient and economically profitable way ? What are the sustainability guarantees of these interventions?
- How to research a veritable partnership in the delivery of rural development programs?

== Impact ==
The impact of PDR-ADM interventions on the environment has been monitored by a multi- temporal analysis of land cover. Changes in land cover are the result of synergies of different factors (climate changes, interventions of PDR-ADM and demographic pressure). The environmental status before the beginning of the project testifies the negative impact of climate and anthropic pressure on the ecosystems. In 1962, the slopes of the highlands were forested but in 1972 some signs of degradation started to be evident until 1984 when the forest completely disappeared. Between 1984 and 2002, a progressive recovery of the natural vegetation has appeared

Approximately, the diachronic land cover study shows that between 1984 and 2002 woodlands increased more than 300% (10.000 ha in 1984 to 45.000 ha in 2002) against a reduction in the shrubby steppes of the 30%. This tendency is supported, besides the PDR-ADM intervention, also by the progressive increase of rainfall, which was recorded as from the years '90.

Even if the same dynamics are observed in the entire Sahelian part of Niger, this trend has only reached such results in Keita, because of the PDR-ADM intervention and the control of the human pressure on natural resources. In addition to wooden natural vegetation recovery, there has also been an evident increase of agricultural surfaces (about 80%) resulting of the substitution of large grassland areas (decreased about 70%) and of PDR-ADM land reclamation interventions (about 12.000 ha). These data confirms that the tendency of natural vegetation recolonisation is reduced by the increase of the human pressure.

Particularly, valley and glacis are exposed to higher agriculture pressure and the trend is to the extensification of croplands. This happens in three ways: the first one, by restoration of degraded lands; the second is by reclamation of grasslands and the last one by clearing of woody vegetation. The first method, supported by the PDR-ADM, concerns the slopes of the Keita valley and also the sandy dunes of the eastern plateaux. Land reclamation of grasslands has been pushed by demographic pressure especially in the Keita and Insafari valleys. Woody vegetation clearing happens especially in the secondary valleys where demographic pressure was low before 1984 and strongly increased later. On the other hand, woody vegetation restoration interests large areas on the slopes and also in the valleys as gallery forests. This trend on the slopes is particularly interesting where it is not directly due to Project interventions (plantation in trenches), because it shows the effectiveness of the watershed approach and the water management on plateaux and slopes.

Croplands degradation is also observed, due mostly to wind erosion and sand accumulation. It gives evidence to the fact desertification is still active even if PDR-ADM interventions reduced its effects. In this context, the territory monitoring in the aspects that could indicate a reactivation of the desertification is very important, especially in this phase where the environment is slowly recovering equilibrium.

=== Improvement of land productivity ===
The pressure derived from the population growth is nowadays one of the main desertification factors, as consequence the classic environmental approach to fight desertification is doomed to fail if it is not joined with actions aimed to reduce the pressure through the creation and diversification of sources of income for the population. The productivity is assessed considering the main products contributing to population livelihood: agriculture, forestry, and livestock. Regarding agriculture, only rain-fed cereals have been considered. Concerning plantations, only the bloc ones as tranchées and banquettes are analysed.

In 2003 the whole project area produced about 40.000 tons of wood compared to 1984 production of about 17.000 tons, with a variation of 133%. The availability of leaf biomass is also increased, about of 57%.

In 1984, cereals production was about 39.000 tons while in 2003 it reached 55.000 tons . Vis-à-vis with these variations, the pressure on the natural resources also strongly increased generally more than productions, as demonstrate by population and livestock growth about 50% during the period.
