= Keita Asama =

Japanese baseball player (born 1984)

Keita Asama (born August 19, 1984, in Chiba) is a Japanese former baseball player. He played in the Pacific League for the Chiba Lotte Marines.
