= Keita, Niger =

Keita
- Commune
- Location in Niger
- Coordinates: 14°45′N 5°46′E
- Country: Niger
- Region: Tahoua Region
- Department: Keita Department
- Commune: Keita Commune

Area
  - Commune: 718.1 km^{2} (277.3 sq mi)
- Elevation: 395 m (1,296 ft)

Population (2012)
  - Commune: 67,304
  - Density: 93.73/km^{2} (242.7/sq mi)
  - Urban: 10,631 (town)

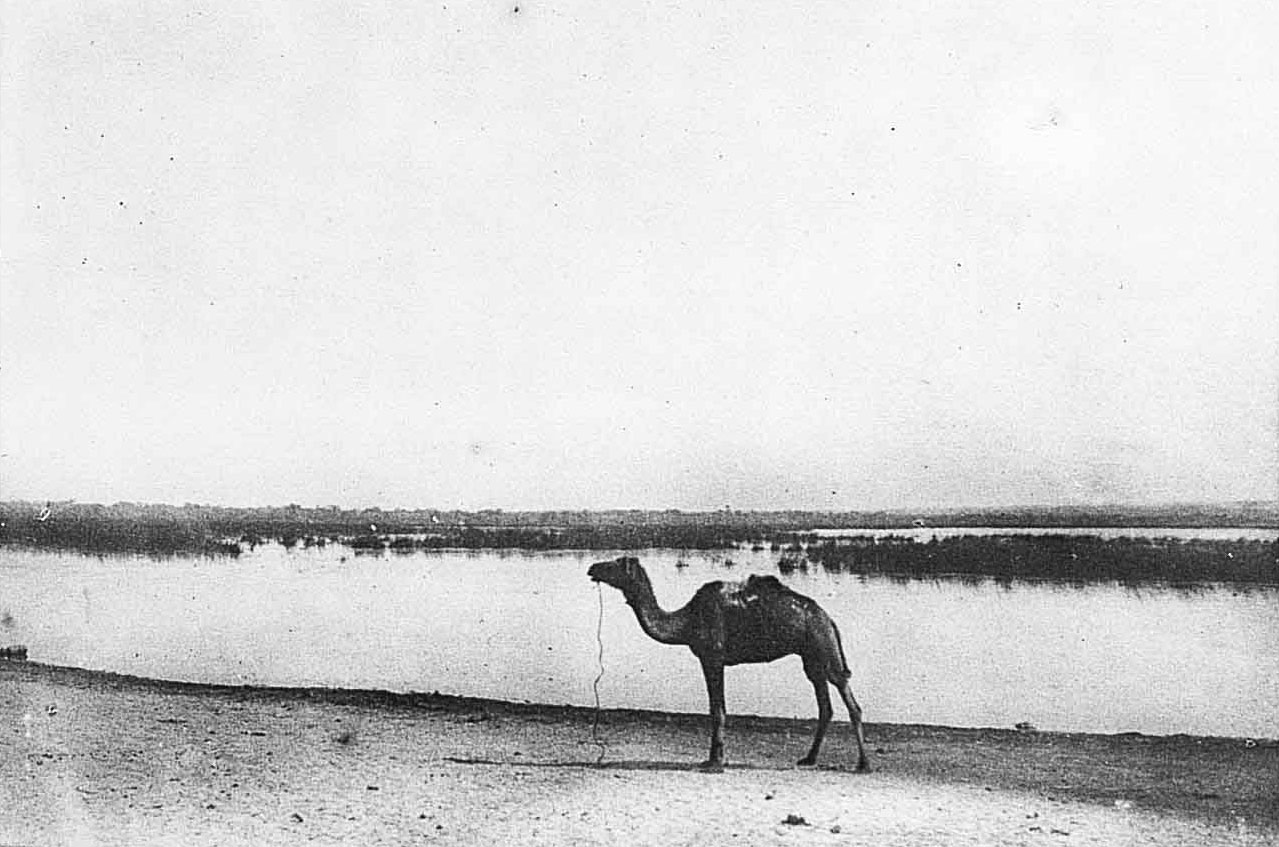
Keita's permanent pond. Adr'ar' of Tahoua.

Keita is a town and commune in Niger. It is the capital of the Keita Department, within the Tahoua Region, and has an urban population of 10,631 as of 2012.

== Geography ==
Keita is located 600 kilometres (370 mi) north-east of the national capital, Niamey. The town is in the semi-arid Sahel, and is threatened by famine. Keita is divided into the districts of Idewaran, Lissawan and Moulela.

== History ==
Keita became the chef-lieu of the eponymous canton in 1913. In 1917, Tuareg insurgents based in Italian-occupied Libya attacked and plundered the city, killing several people including canton chief Afadandan Ichawa. The attack led to a successful counter-offensive of the French. In the late 1940s and early 1950s, Keita developed a rising number of inhabitants and transformed from a village to a small town. Keita became the prefecture seat in 1964.

By the early 1980s, clear signs of desertification had begun. As a result, a development plan was signed in December 1983 that stressed sustainable long-term development of resources. The "Keita Project" was a 16-year plan that led to digging wells and the drilling of boreholes for irrigation of crops and for drinking water. Trees were planted to prevent soil erosion and promote agriculture. From 1984 to 1990, nearly 3,000 hectares (7,400 acres) of land was "reclaimed" and 100 kilometres (62 mi) of rural roads were built, requiring heavy labor from the inhabitants of the town.

== Demographics ==
In the 1977 census, the population of Keita was measured to be 3,572. By 1988, its population had increased to 6,644. In the 2001 census, the population of Keita was 8,633. It increased to 10,631 as of 2012. The town is a center of Tuareg people, who have migrated from surrounding areas. According to a study in 1988, 10.9 percent of the population is permanent migrants, with 8.5 percent being seasonal migrants.

== Economy and infrastructure ==
Agriculture is the main occupation in Keita, and a nearby pond (currently dry) facilitated the growth of garden crops and millet. Although Tamaske is a bigger center of commerce in the region, Keita has some artisanal production. Ironworking is practiced, as was mining until the end of the colonial period.

There is a bus station in the town. Keita has a limited amount of electricity. A community radio station with a transmitter of 150 W was established in Keita in 1998. Keita is the site of a civil court. One of the biggest infrastructural problems in the city is the extremely poor medical care. In addition, 46% of the population has no access to clean drinking water.

== Notable people ==
Former foreign minister of Niger Aïchatou Boulama Kané was born in Keita in 1955.

== Twin towns ==
Pesaro, Italy is twinned with Keita, in the initiative of the Italian development firm that operates in Keita.
