= Ibrohamane =

Coordinates: 14°47′50″N 5°55′52″E

- Commune and village
- Interactive map of Ibrohamane
- Country: Niger

Area
  - Total: 517 sq mi (1,339 km^{2})

Population (2012 census)
  - Total: 88,724
  - Density: 171.6/sq mi (66.26/km^{2})
- Time zone: UTC+1 (WAT)

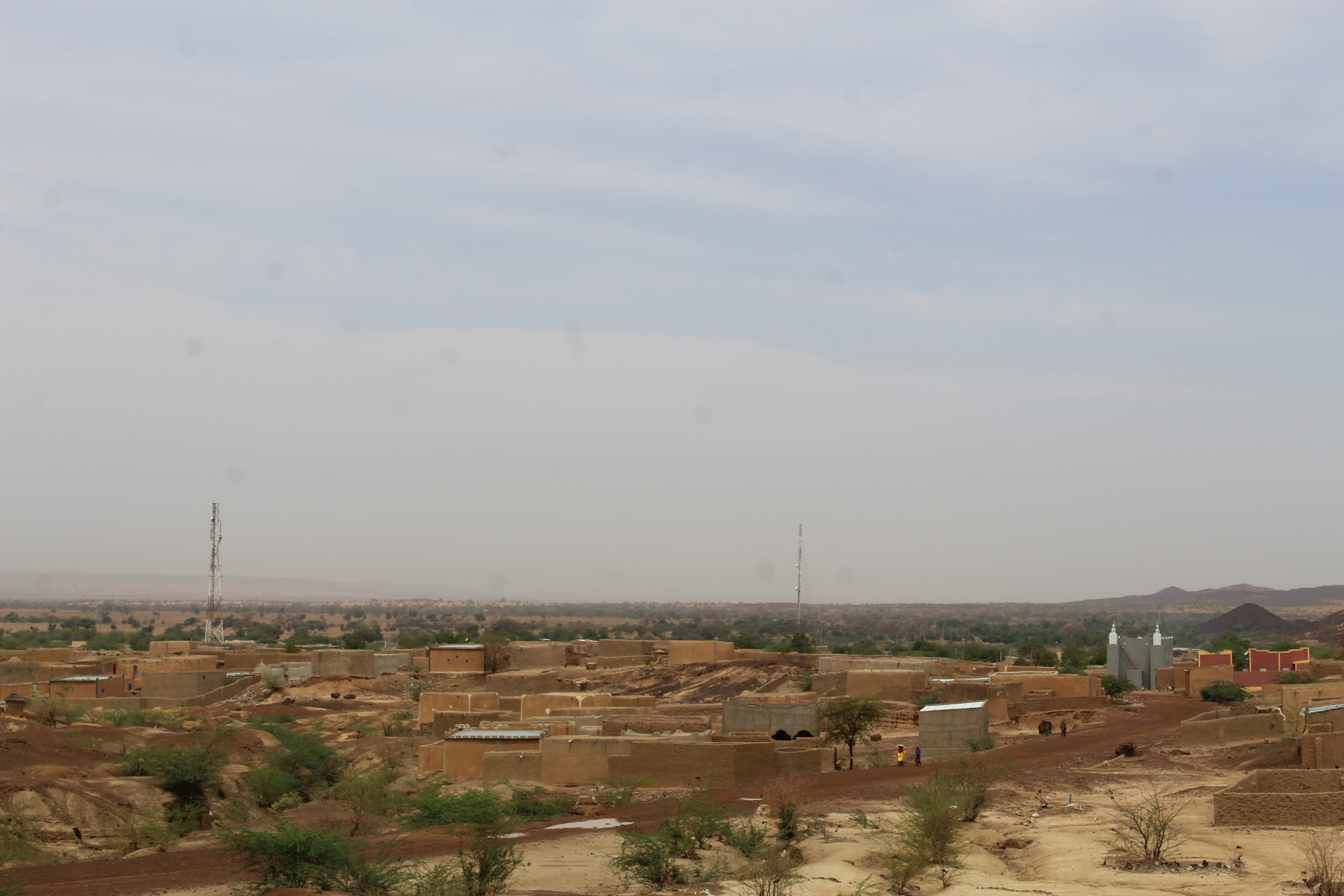
Mountains in Ibrohamane.

Ibrohamane is a village and rural commune in Niger. As of 2012, it had a population of 88,724.
