= Floods in the United States (2000–present) =

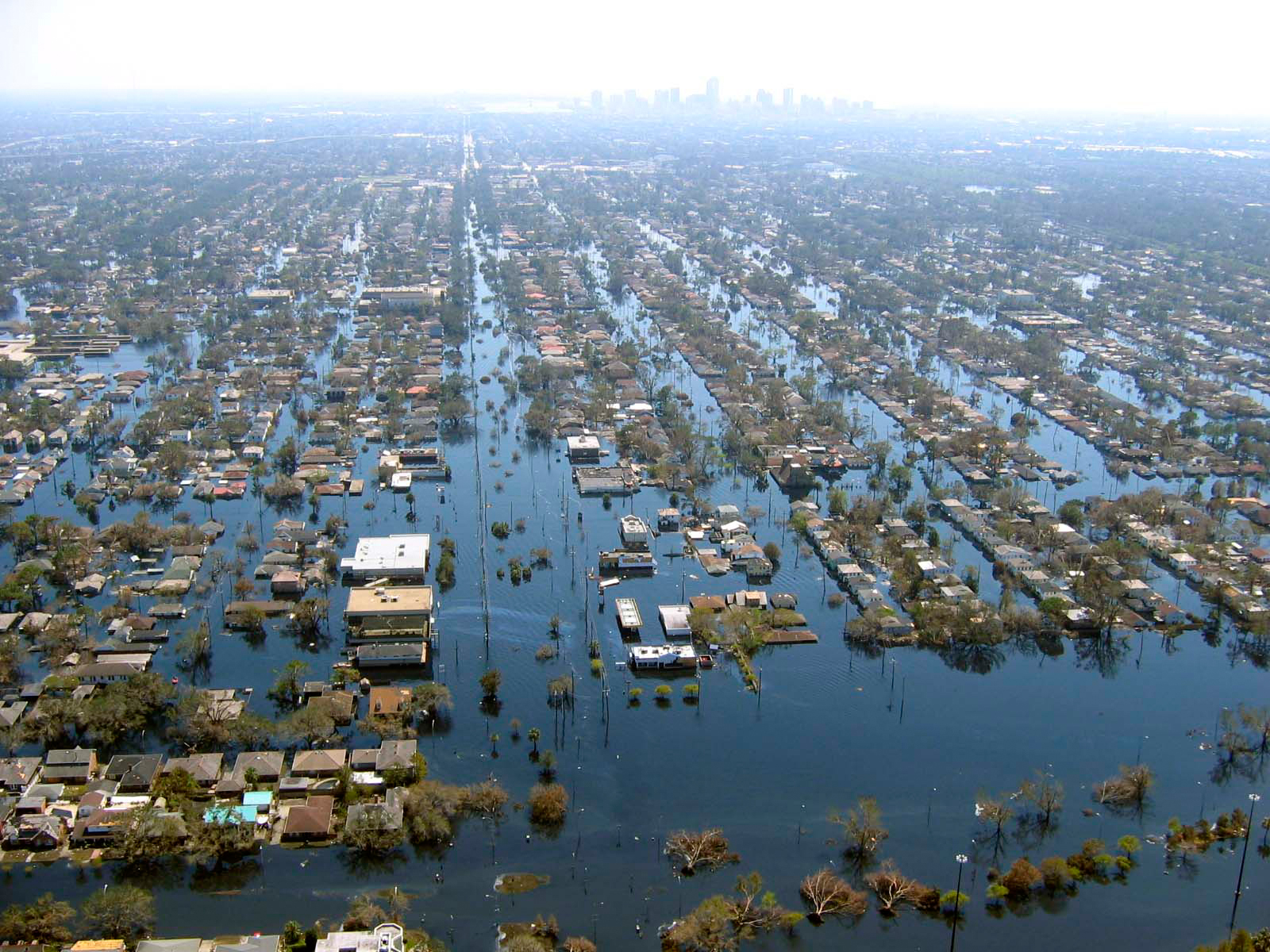
View of flooded New Orleans in the aftermath of Hurricane Katrina

Floods in the United States (2000–present) is a list of flood events which were of significant impact to the country during the 21st century, since 2000. Floods are generally caused by excessive rainfall, excessive snowmelt, storm surge from hurricanes, and dam failure.

== 2000s ==
=== November 2000 Hawaii floods ===
Tropical Storm Paul formed on October 25 from the Intertropical Convergence Zone (ITCZ) to the southwest of Mexico, and it dissipated four days later without becoming a significant tropical cyclone. The remnants of Paul reached the Hawaiian Islands in early November 2000, and interacted with an upper-level low, dropping very heavy rains from November 1 to 3.

=== Tropical Storm Allison floods in Louisiana and Texas – June 2001 ===
The remains of the tropical cyclone sat and spun over eastern Texas for several days before moving eastward just inland of the Gulf coast. Heavy rains fell along the western Gulf coast that week, with storm totals of nearly 940 mm (37 in) near Houston and 1,041 mm (41.0 in) west of Beaumont. Damage from the storm was estimated near US$6 billion (2001 dollars), and 41 perished from the flood.

=== Hurricane Katrina (2005) storm surge – Louisiana and Mississippi ===
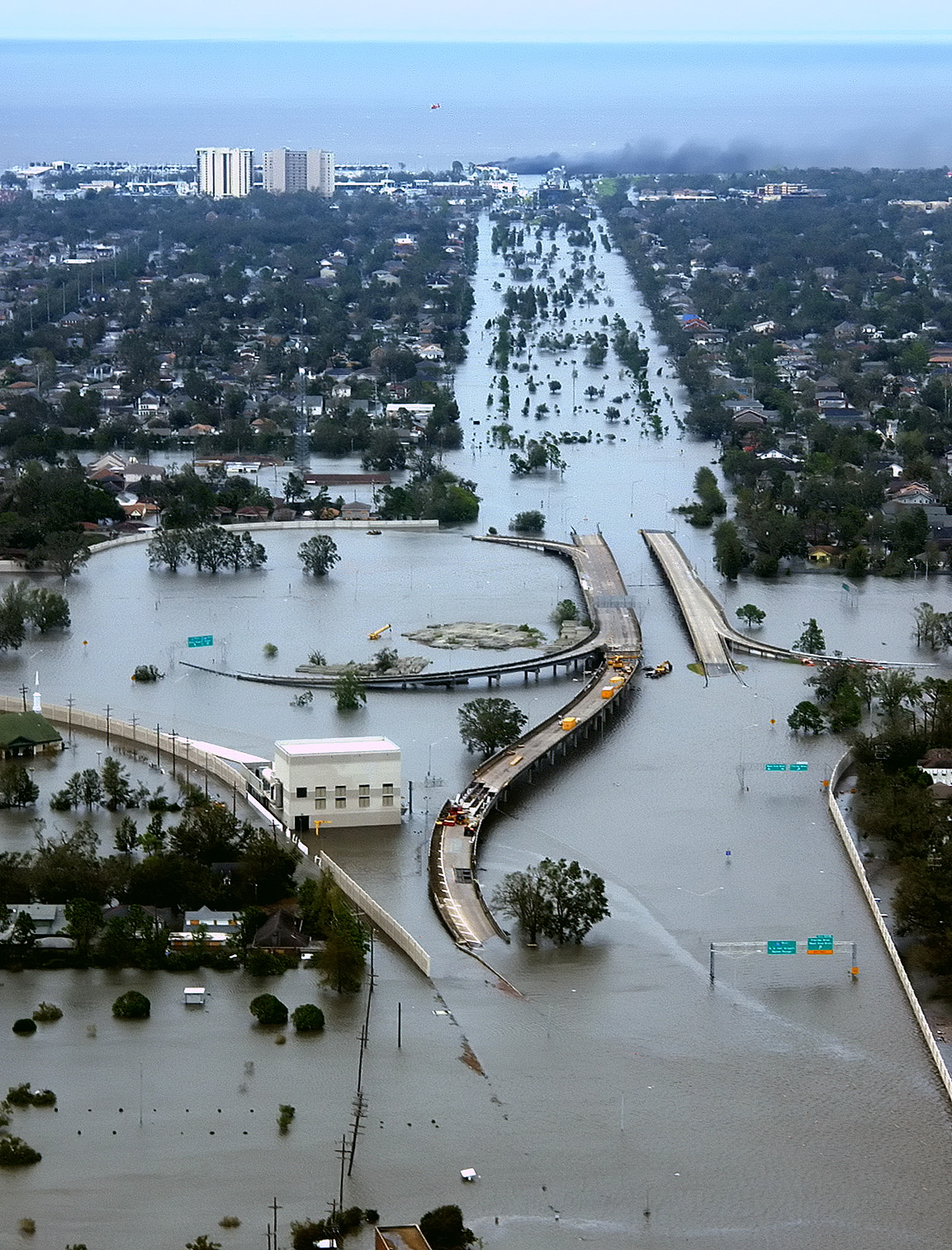
Flooded I-10/I-610/West End Blvd interchange and surrounding area of northwest New Orleans from Hurricane Katrina.

On August 29, 2005, Hurricane Katrina made landfall along the southeast tip of Louisiana as a Category 3 hurricane after reaching its peak intensity as a Category 5 hurricane on August 28. The strong northerly flow behind Katrina caused breaks and failures in the levees that protected the lower Ninth Ward and along other canals in New Orleans, flooding 80 percent of the city for nearly a month. The mouth of the Mississippi River saw breaks in its levee system due to storm surge. In Mississippi, a massive storm surge destroyed most structures along the coast including floating casinos, and preliminary figures show that the storm surge was higher than in Hurricane Camille of 1969. There were 1,836 fatalities, mostly from flooding.

=== Mid-Atlantic and New England Flood – October 2005 ===
The combination of a moisture fetch set up by Subtropical Depression 22 and Tropical Storm Tammy, as well as an additional tropical disturbance that rode up a stationary frontal zone, set up excessive rains from coastal sections of the Mid-Atlantic states through southern New England. In New Hampshire, the Monadnock region was affected, with Alstead among the hardest hit as 300 mm (12 in) of rain fell within 30 hours, allowing this month to be the wettest in the history of the Granite State. It was considered a once-in-500-year flood event.

=== Ka Loko Reservoir – March 2006 ===
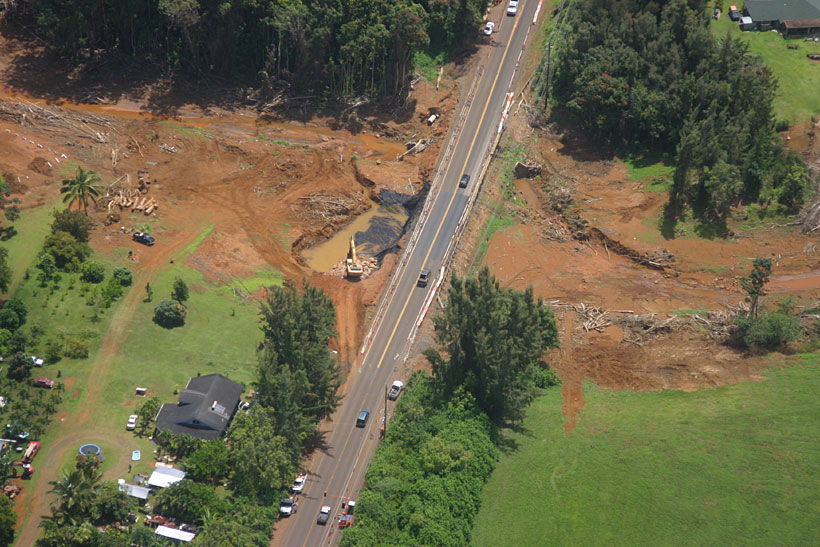
Aerial view of the highway damage caused by rushing flood waters

Prolonged rainfall fell across Hawaii between February 19 and April 2, 2006, as upper-level cyclones kept closing off northwest of the archipelago, virtually eliminating their normal trade winds, and bringing some of the wettest conditions seen in the state since March 1951. Four of the cyclones were kona lows. The heavy rain event of March 1 to 3 brought severe flooding to the east-facing slopes of the Koolau Range in Oahu, with 571 mm (22.5 in) falling in two days at Punalu'u. During the next rain event from March 8 to 11, many of the larger islands received significant amounts of rainfall. Flash flooding occurred in Maakua Stream, and severe inundation affected communities from Laie to Kahana. As much as 356 mm (14.0 in) of rain fell over north Kauai, forcing the closure of Kuhio Highway at the Hanalei Bridge for the second time in 24 hours. 150–255 mm (5.9–10.0 in) of rain fell upon the southeast-facing slopes of the Big Island causing numerous road closures in Hilo. North and east Kauai received 200–300 mm (7.9–11.8 in) of rain over a 3-day period. Mount Waialeale recorded over 711 mm (28.0 in) during this 4-day period. The Kauai Marriott Resort suffered significant damage due to the overflow of Keonaawanui Stream during the early morning hours of March 11. The third significant rain event between March 13 and 18 was too much for Ka Loko Dam in northeast Kauai, which failed in the early morning of March 14. The wall of water swept away homes and structures and resulted in 3 confirmed deaths and 4 persons missing. Repeated thunderstorms and heavy rains produced numerous road closures from flooding and inundated many properties.

=== Mid-Atlantic Flood – June 2006 ===
A stalled frontal boundary, a tropical connection, and a developing tropical disturbance led to heavy rains across the Mid-Atlantic and Northeast, particularly in central Maryland and Pennsylvania during late June. Rainfall amounts ranged up to 430 mm (17 in) during the several days of heavy rain. There was the threat of dam failure around an earthen dam around Lake Needwood in eastern Montgomery County, Maryland, due to the deluge.

=== Western Gulf Coast flood – October 2006 ===
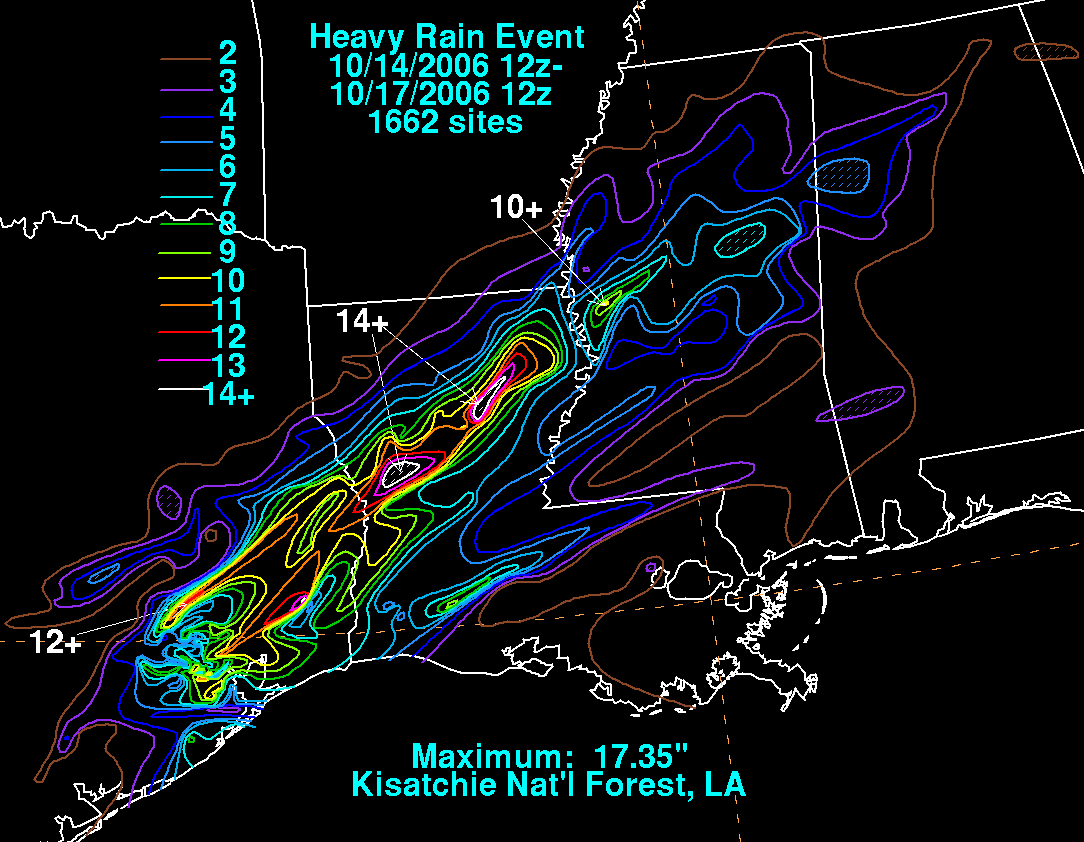
Rainfall in Western Gulf Coast states from October 14–17, 2006

A trio of heavy rainfall events, on October 14–17, October 18–19, and again from October 26–27 set the stage for moderate to significant flooding across portions of eastern Texas, Louisiana, as well as portions of Arkansas and Mississippi. This was the wettest spell for the region since T.S. Allison of the 1989 Atlantic hurricane season. Two of these events were fed by tropical cyclones from the 2006 Pacific Hurricane Season, Norman and Paul, which affected western Mexico. Each rainfall event led to localized maxima in excess of 250 mm (9.8 in), and helped break a dry spell across the region. Localized totals ranged up to 711 mm (28.0 in) near Kountze, Texas during the 13-day period from October 14 through October 27.

=== Washington State Flood – November 2006 ===
Severe flooding in Washington state closed Mount Rainier National Park and damaged several mountain towns, including North Bend.

=== 2007 Midwest flooding – August 2007 ===
A stalled frontal boundary stretching from Iowa to Ohio was the focus for several rounds of heavy rainfall resulting in flash flooding the week of August 18 – August 25, 2007. Minnesota, Iowa, Wisconsin, Illinois, Indiana and Ohio were the states hardest hit. Across the six states, 18 counties were declared federal disaster areas. Numerous rainfall records, both for most rain in the month of August as well as 24-hour rainfall totals were recorded. Over 457 mm (18.0 in) of rain was recorded in some locations during this week. At least $100 million in damages has been reported in Minnesota and Wisconsin alone, and 18 people were killed.

=== 2007 Oregon and Washington floods – December 2007 ===
Flooding occurred in Oregon and Washington along with high winds. Interstate 5 was both closed and damaged.

=== 2008 Midwest flooding – Spring 2008 ===
Flooding occurred in the midwest part of the United States.

=== June 2008 Midwest Flood ===
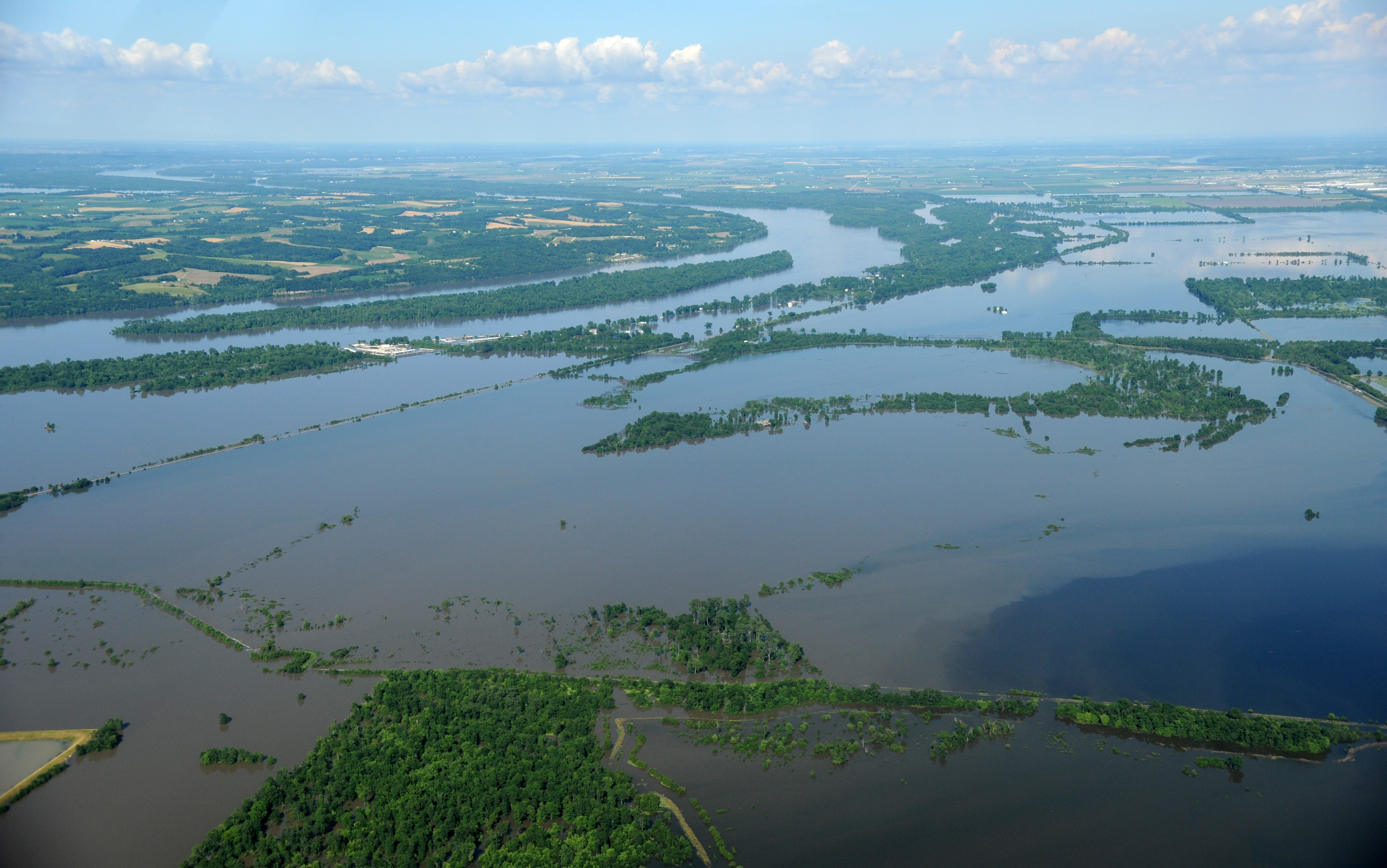
Flood waters impact areas west of St. Louis

Extensive flooding is occurring or has occurred on the Wabash, White, Zumbro, Kickapoo, Wisconsin, Baraboo, Cedar, Crawfish, Fox, Iowa, Rock, and Des Moines rivers, as well as the upper Mississippi River, leading to extensive flooding in Iowa, Wisconsin, Indiana, Minnesota, Michigan, and Missouri.

=== Spring 2009 Red River Flood ===
In 2009, a record flood caused extensive damages along the Red River of the North, affecting the areas of Fargo-Moorhead, Wahpeton-Breckenridge, and Grand Forks between the Minnesota–North Dakota border, as well as Winnipeg and its surroundings in Manitoba, Canada.

=== September 2009 Southern Flood ===
A major rain event from September 16 through 22, which brought over ten inches of rain to the Atlanta, Birmingham, Chattanooga, Athens areas as well as other parts of the states of Alabama, Georgia, Tennessee and North Carolina. As of September 22, 2009, in Atlanta, 9 people had been killed due to the floods.

== 2010s ==
=== March 2010 Southern New England Flood ===
A major rainfall event which lasted from March 1–30 which brought twelve inches of rain and flooded the Pawtuxet River, Blackstone River and numerous other ocean, lakes, ponds and streams in Rhode Island. The flooding was the worst in Rhode Island history, as the Pawtuxet River crested over 69 feet—12 feet above flood stage, shattering the previous record by several feet. The rainstorm, which occurred during the cool, dry season, added 8.79" to an already rainy March. At 16.34" of rain, it was the wettest month on record for Rhode Island. A seasonal high tide led to severe coastal flooding in Bristol, Rhode Island; four of Rhode Island's counties were declared emergency disaster zones. The Warwick Mall in Warwick was flooded with 20 inches of water, leaving hundreds of employees out of work. A sewage treatment plant in the area failed, contaminating the rainwater with raw sewage. Hundreds of homes in Warwick, Cranston and Johnston were flooded with over a foot of contaminated water. Many towns in Southeastern Massachusetts were also affected by the flood.

=== May 2010 Tennessee floods ===
The May 2010 Tennessee floods were 1000-year floods in Middle Tennessee, West Tennessee, south-central and western Kentucky and northern Mississippi as the result of torrential rains on May 1–2, 2010. Floods from these rains affected the area for several days afterwards, resulting in thirty-one deaths and widespread property damage totaling $2.3 billion.

=== September 2010 Minnesota/Wisconsin Flood ===
Flash floods put towns underwater and forced evacuations in Minnesota and Wisconsin. A strong system caused the heavy rain and flash flooding in the Upper Midwest. Some of the worse flooding came a week after the flood. Near record stage on the Minnesota River in New Ulm, Mankato, St Peter, Jordan, Shakopee, Savage, and breaking records in Henderson. Records were also broken on the Cannon River and the Zumbro River.

=== 2011 Missouri River Flood ===
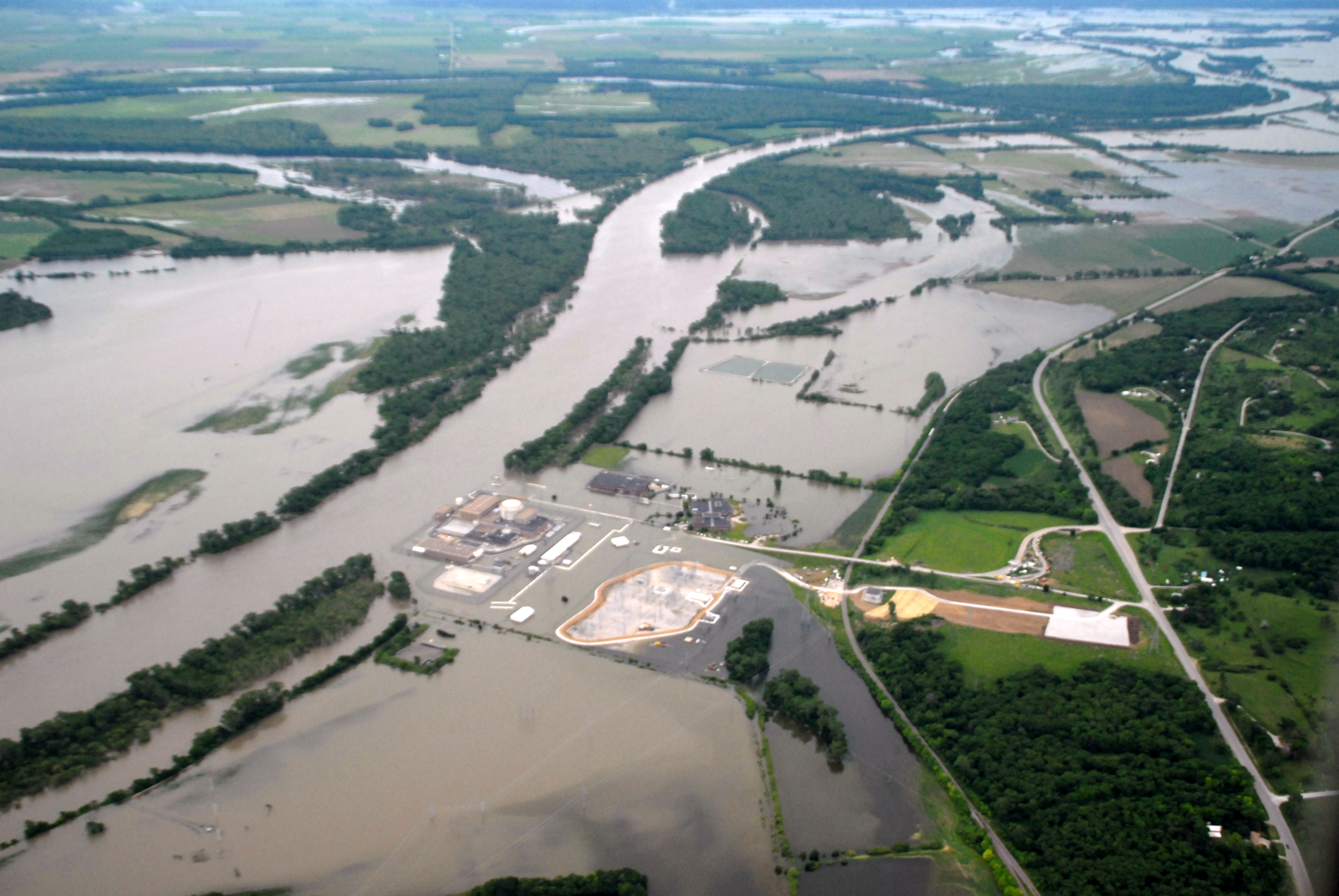
Corps of Engineers photo of June 16, 2011, showing the Fort Calhoun nuclear power plant surrounded by flood water

The 2011 Missouri River floods was a flooding event on the Missouri River in the United States, in May and June that year. The flooding was triggered by record snowfall in the Rocky Mountains of Montana and Wyoming along with near-record spring rainfall in central and eastern Montana. All six major dams along the Missouri River released record amounts of water to prevent overflow which led to flooding threatening several towns and cities along the river from Montana to Missouri; in particular Bismarck, North Dakota; Pierre, South Dakota; Dakota Dunes, South Dakota; South Sioux City, Nebraska, Sioux City, Iowa; Omaha, Nebraska; Council Bluffs, Iowa; Kansas City, Missouri; Jefferson City, Missouri, as well as putting many smaller towns at risk. According to the National Weather Service, in the second half of the month of May 2011, almost a year's worth of rain fell over the upper Missouri River basin. Extremely heavy rainfall in conjunction with an estimated 212 percent of normal snowpack in the Rocky Mountains contributed to this flooding event.

=== Spring 2011 Mississippi River Floods ===
Two of the most deadly tornado outbreaks in U.S. history combined with spring snowmelt cause the Mississippi to swell to record levels. Missouri, Illinois, Tennessee, Arkansas, Mississippi, and Louisiana were affected, and the western counties of Kentucky, Tennessee, and Mississippi were declared federal disaster areas. The Birds Point-New Madrid Floodway was put into use for the first time since 1937. Nine floodgates of the Morganza Spillway were opened, marking the first use of the gates since the 1973 flood. 330 of the Bonnet Carré Spillway's gates were opened to save the levees protecting New Orleans. There was concern that if the Old River Control Structure, the Morganza Spillway, or the Bonnet Carré Spillway failed, the Mississippi River could change its course, flowing either into the Atchafalaya Basin or Lake Pontchartrain.

=== September 2011 Mid-Atlantic Flooding ===
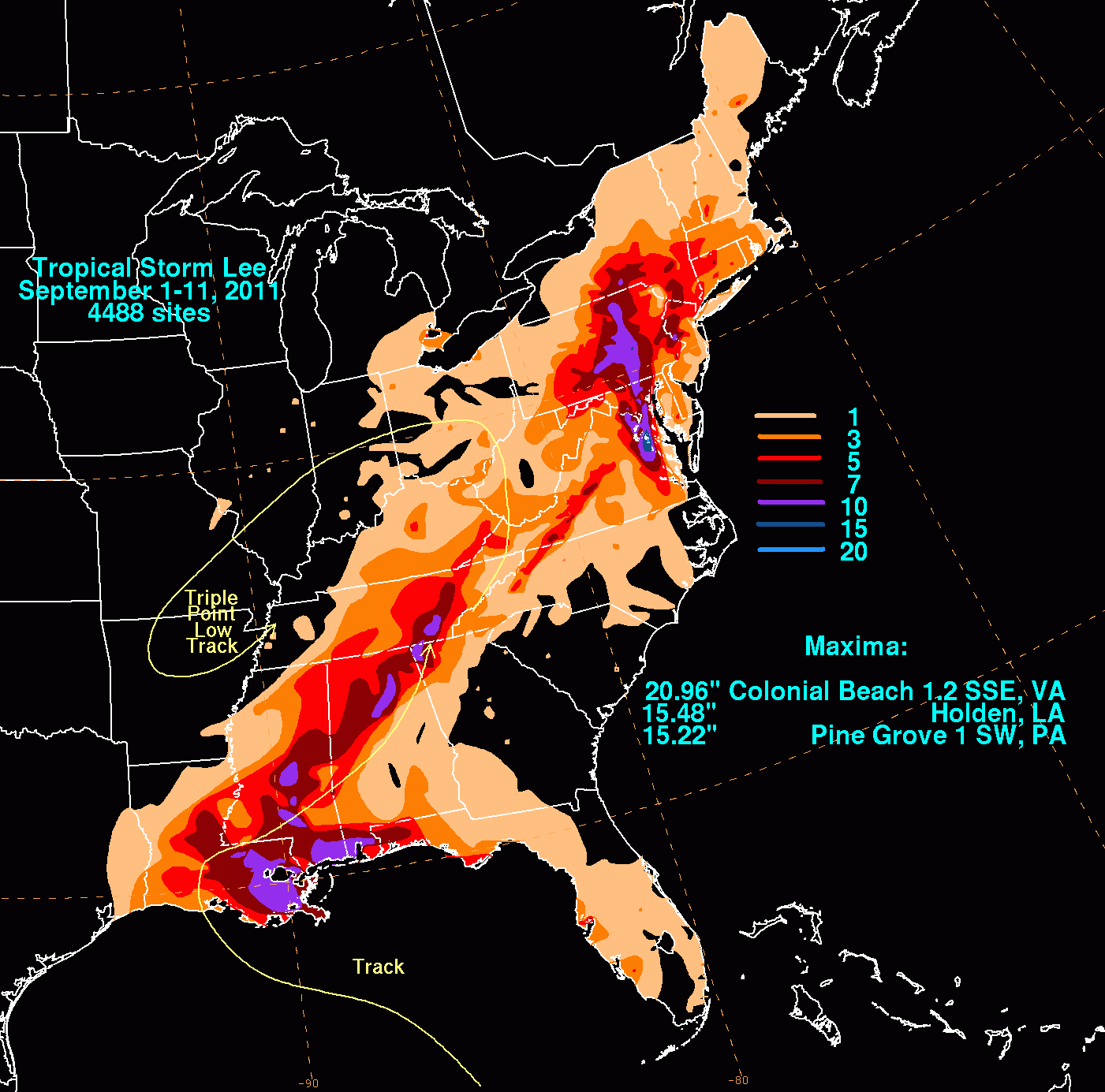
Rainfall caused by Tropical Storm Lee

In early September, the remnants of Tropical Storm Lee had stalled due to Hurricane Katia. As a result, the main cyclone stalled over the Midwest, and a cold front associated with Lee stalled over the Northeastern states. This drew tropical moisture into the Mid-Atlantic. Over 1 1/2 feet of rain fell in some areas from September 3 to 7. Moisture from Hurricane Irene had already saturated the ground little over a week before, leaving the runoff plunging straight into waterways. Streams and creeks throughout the region flooded, as well as moderate flooding of the Delaware River in some spots. The worst of the flooding stayed in the Susquehanna River area. Both the West Branch and North Branch, as well as most of their tributaries, flooded. Flood damage was sustained in a swath from southern New York to the mouth, located at Havre de Grace in northern Maryland. Record flooding occurred in the Binghamton, New York region, and in northeastern and central Pennsylvania. In Wilkes-Barre, the water was measured at 42.66 feet, an astounding number compared to the record of 40.90 feet Hurricane Agnes set in 1972. Municipalities along the river sustained major damage, many households and businesses among them declared condemned. The Bloomsburg Fair, an event in Bloomsburg since 1855, was canceled for the first time. Damages for the disaster were in the tens of millions (USD), if not hundreds.

=== 2013 Midwestern U.S. floods ===
US Midwest floods, 2013
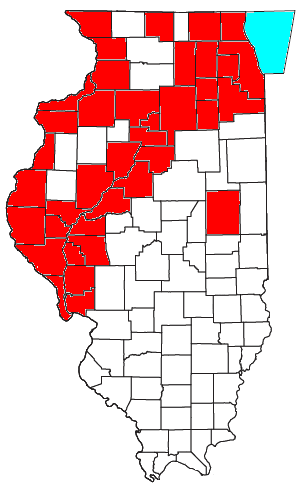
- Flooding disaster areas in Illinois April 2013

Meteorological history
- Duration: April–June 2013

Overall effects
- Fatalities: 5
- Damage: Unknown
- Areas affected: US Midwest

Heavy rainfall, severe thunderstorms, and flash flooding occurred across several Midwest states in April 2013. Heavy rain fell after moist air surged ahead of a strong cold front and low-pressure system, leaving many rivers swollen. As much as 8 inches of rainfall fell in some places. Flood warnings were in effect from Michigan to northern Arkansas and Tennessee. As of April 22, more than 200 gauges were in flood stage along rivers in the upper Midwest, including 43 in "major" flood stage. The floods have been responsible for five fatalities.

By May 29, the statewide average rainfall in Iowa had reached 16.4 inches, making it the wettest spring in the 141 years of recorded climate data for the state. On the same day, the University of Iowa began installing Hesco bastions around low-lying campus buildings, in anticipation of flooding on the Iowa River. On May 30, because of continued rain, the U.S. Army Corps of Engineers increased the outflow from the Coralville Reservoir to 14,000 cubic feet per second, leading Iowa City to declare a civil emergency and forcing the closure of low-lying portions of North Dubuque Street, a major route for commuter traffic into Iowa City. By June 1, the outflow from Coralville Reservoir had been increased to 18,000 cubic feet per second with the control gates fully opened, putting an estimated 50–60 structures at risk of inundation. The Cedar River crested in Cedar Rapids, Iowa early on June 2, reaching the 10th highest level ever recorded. The river briefly forced the closure of the Edgewood Road Bridge, but the city's flood defences prevented additional damage. On June 13, water levels of the Coralville reservoir had finally fallen to the point where the Corps of Engineers was able to reduce the outflow to 14,000 cubic feet per second, and Iowa City was able to reopen North Dubuque Street on Sunday, June 16.

=== September 2013 Colorado floods ===
During the week starting September 9, a slow moving cold front stalled over Colorado, clashing with warm humid monsoonal air from the south. This resulted in rain and flooding along Colorado's Front Range from Colorado Springs north to Fort Collins. The situation intensified on September 11 and 12. Worst hit was Boulder County, with up to 21 inches of rain recorded. At least 6 deaths along the Front Range have been attributed to the flooding, and evacuations took place in many low-lying areas. The town of Lyons in Boulder County was isolated by the flooding of the St. Vrain River, and several earth dams along the Front Range burst or were overtopped. As of late September 13, according to the Office of Emergency Management, there were 172 people unaccounted for and at least 3 dead in flood area of Boulder County.

=== 2013 Texas flood ===
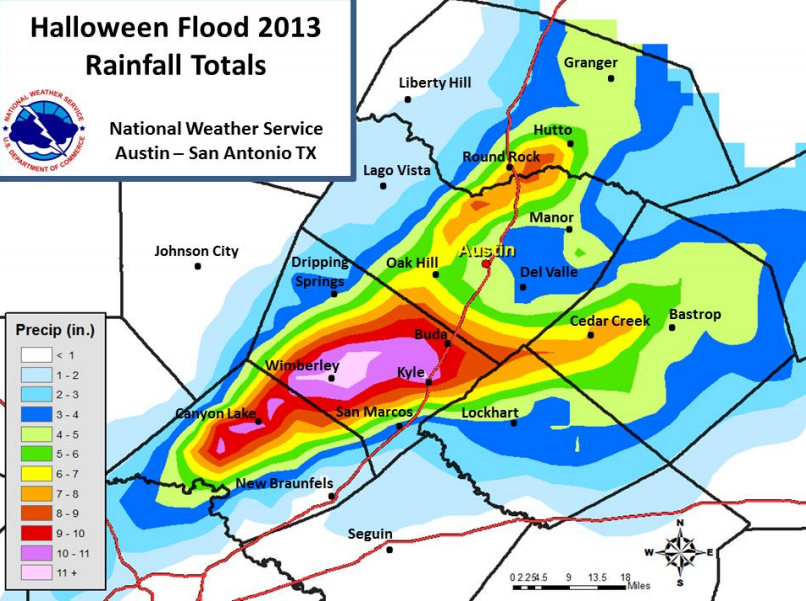
Rainfall totals across central Texas on October 31

In a two-day period on October 30–31 a flood event occurred in Texas. The floods prompted evacuations and water rescues across the Austin area, and the National Weather Service in Austin issued a rare flash flood emergency for the city of Austin and areas in Travis County. 81 flood-related incidents were also reported, and 7 fatalities occurred.

=== 2014 Gulf Coast Flood ===
On April 29–30, 2014, a slow-moving cold front associated with a tornado outbreak in the Deep South dumped a record setting amount of rainfall, inundating the western Florida Panhandle and Southwest Alabama. Pensacola was estimated to have received as much as 26 inches of rain in only 25 hours, with 5.68 inches of it falling in only an hour at Pensacola International Airport. A landslide caused a major portion of Scenic Highway in Pensacola to collapse into the bay it overlooks. Areas east of Pensacola received as much as 15–20 inches of rain, peaking at 20.39 inches in Milton and 14.15 inches at Mary Esther. The majority of this rainfall occurred in a time period of about 9 hours on the morning of April 30. In Alabama, rainfall amounts peaked at 23.67 inches in Orange Beach, and 17.20 inches in Mobile.

=== 2014 Southeastern Michigan flood ===
On August 11, 2014, historic flooding occurred in and around Detroit after a storm brought about 5 inches (130 mm) of rain in a period of several hours. Many freeways across the area were heavily flooded, especially the Interstate 75/Interstate 696 interchange in Madison Heights, Michigan. Damage from the storm totaled $1.8 billion. In addition, two people were killed.

=== 2014 New York flood ===
Record setting rainfall presenting 60 days of precipitation fell from the same system that precipitated the 2014 Southeastern Michigan flood two days earlier on suburbs of New York City. A 24-hour state record for precipitation was set at 13.57 inches (345 mm). In a single hour between 5am and 6am in Islip, over 5 inches (130 mm) fell, including 1.08 inches (27 mm) in 9 minutes. One person was killed. Portions of Interstate 495, New York State Route 27, New York State Route 110, New York State Route 135, the Northern State Parkway, the Southern State Parkway and the Sagtikos Parkway closed. A baseball game at Yankee Stadium between the New York Yankees and Baltimore Orioles was postponed. Damage was at least $35.2 million. Further south, flash flood emergencies were issued in the Washington–Baltimore combined statistical area, with the Baltimore Harbor Tunnel and parts of the Baltimore Beltway closed due to flooding.

=== 2014 Arizona flood ===
A record setting rainfall event deposited close to 3 inches of precipitation on the area, breaking the old record set in 1933.

=== 2015 Texas-Oklahoma flood ===
Weeks of heavy rain caused by a slow-moving front resulted in devastating floods across much of Texas and Oklahoma during the week of May 24, 2015. Most notably, the town of Wimberley, Texas, along with a significant portion of Hays County was devastated when the Blanco River rose to almost 30 feet above flood stage overnight. Later that week, Houston also experienced widespread flash flooding in highly populated portions of the city as well.

=== 2015 Louisiana flood ===
The 2015 Louisiana floods took place during June 2015. The Red River of the South flooded parts of northern Louisiana. The Red River reached its highest level in over 70 years during the floods.

=== 2015 Utah floods ===
Heavy rain from the remnants of Hurricane Linda fell over southern Utah, causing flash floods in Zion National Park and the town of Hildale. The floods killed between 16 and 20 people.

=== 2015 Missouri floods ===
In December 2015, major floods occurred in Missouri. Southwestern Missouri was the most significantly impacted and experienced over a foot of rainfall, while other parts of the Missouri Ozarks saw 5–12 inches of rain. The flooding caused 13 deaths, and two wastewater treatment plants were overwhelmed by the floods, leaking sewage into the floodwaters.

=== March 2016 Southern and Midwestern floods ===
In early March 2016, the jet stream moved southward and increased the collection of moisture from the Gulf of Mexico causing a large, slow-moving weather system that produced torrential rains and severe weather as it made its way from Texas into the Mississippi Valley. On March 8, the storm reached northwest Louisiana, where it proceeded to create huge flood events near Shreveport. Many neighborhoods around Red Chute Bayou and Flat River in Bossier Parish were quickly inundated and evacuated. In the neighborhood of Golden Meadows in Bossier City, the rapid rainfall overwhelmed storm drains and stranded people in their homes with up to four feet of water in some areas. As the storm later moved east, the rest of North Louisiana was impacted with up to twenty five inches of rain recorded in some areas such as Monroe. There were also many areas in other states such as Illinois, Texas, Oklahoma, Mississippi, Missouri, and Tennessee affected by this storm. Five deaths are directly attributed to this storm, and over 3500 people were displaced.

=== April 2016 Houston floods ===
In April 2016, Houston, Texas was flooded with over one foot of rain in 24 hours. The event was termed "the Tax Day flood" and pushed local creek and reservoir levels to new records. Until Hurricane Harvey in 2017, this was the worst flooding Houston had seen since 2001's Tropical Storm Allison.

=== May 2016 Oklahoma floods ===
The 2016 Oklahoma floods set precipitation records in both Texas and Oklahoma.

=== June 2016 West Virginia floods ===
The June 23, 2016 flooding in West Virginia was one of the deadliest floods in state history, and deadliest flash flood in U.S. history since the 2010 Tennessee Floods. The flooding was caused by 8 to 10 inches of rainfall over a 12-hour period. 23 people perished from the floods, and hardest hit counties included Greenbrier, Kanawha, Jackson, and Ohio. The flooding caused approximately $1.2 billion in damages.

=== July 2016 Maryland floods ===
Significant flash flooding affected the Baltimore Metropolitan Area, and especially hard hit was Ellicott City where up to six inches of rain fell within two hours. Two people were killed and significant damage was wrought to the historic downtown district of Ellicott City.

=== 2016 Louisiana floods ===
In August 2016, prolonged rainfall from an unpredictable storm resulted in catastrophic flooding in Louisiana. Louisiana governor John Bel Edwards called the disaster a "historic, unprecedented flooding event" and declared a state of emergency. Many rivers and waterways, particularly the Amite and Comite rivers, reached record levels, and rainfall exceeded 20 inches (510 mm) in multiple parishes. At least 60 people were killed and total damages exceeded $10 billion.

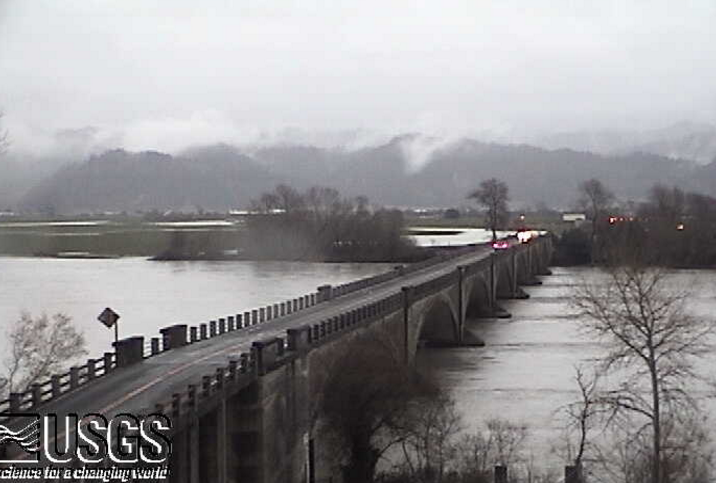
2017 Eel River flood at Fernbridge, California near Ferndale, California

=== 2017 California floods ===
The 2017 California floods were a series of floods that affected parts of California in the first half of 2017. Northern California saw its wettest winter in almost a century, breaking the previous record set in the winter of 1982–1983. Flooding related to the same storm systems also impacted parts of western Nevada and southern Oregon. Damage to California roads and highways alone was estimated at over $1.05 billion and at least 5 people were killed as a result of the floods.

=== 2017 Florida floods ===
From August 23–28, 2017, Potential Tropical Cyclone Ten's precursor stalled over Florida, causing the worst flooding the state had seen in at least 20 years. Fort Myers and other areas in southwestern Florida were the hardest-hit, forcing the evacuation of more than 200 people. The disturbance dropped a maximum total of rainfall in excess of 30 inches (76 cm) of rain in Ten Mile Canal and Six Mile Cypress Slough Preserve, in southwestern Florida, in addition to 18 inches (46 cm) of rain in the western parts of Fort Myers. The system killed two people in Florida and caused more than $1.923 million (2017 USD) in damages.

Less than two weeks later, Hurricane Irma made landfall in southwestern Florida on September 10, bringing additional flooding to the region, causing significantly more damage in the state.

=== July 2017 Payson floods ===
The Ellison Creek flooding was one of the deadliest floods to ever hit Gila County, Arizona. The floods hit a popular hiking trail near the town of Payson which killed 10 people, including 5 children.

=== 2017 Southeastern Texas and Southern Louisiana floods ===
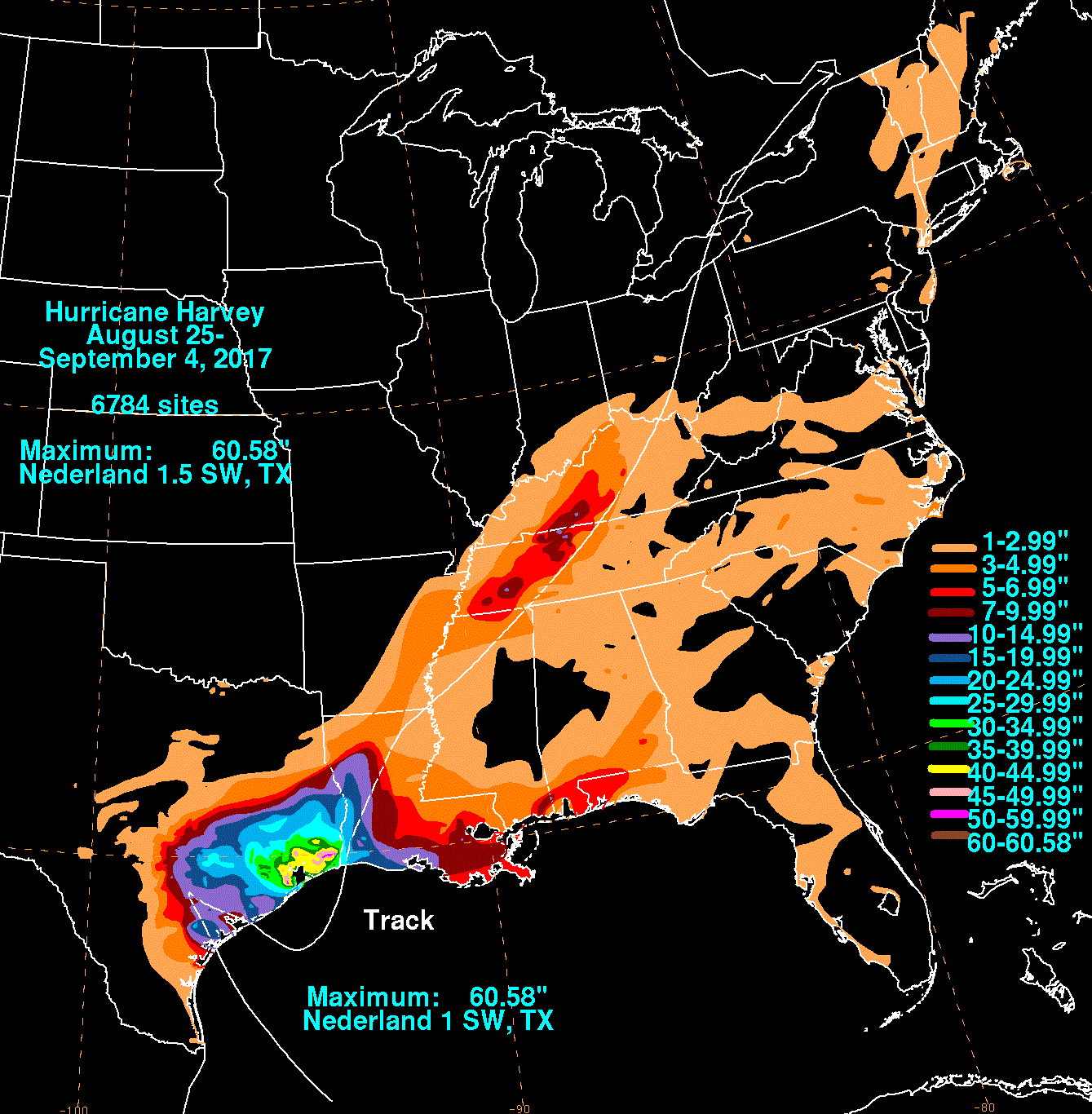
A map of Harvey's rainfall over the entire states

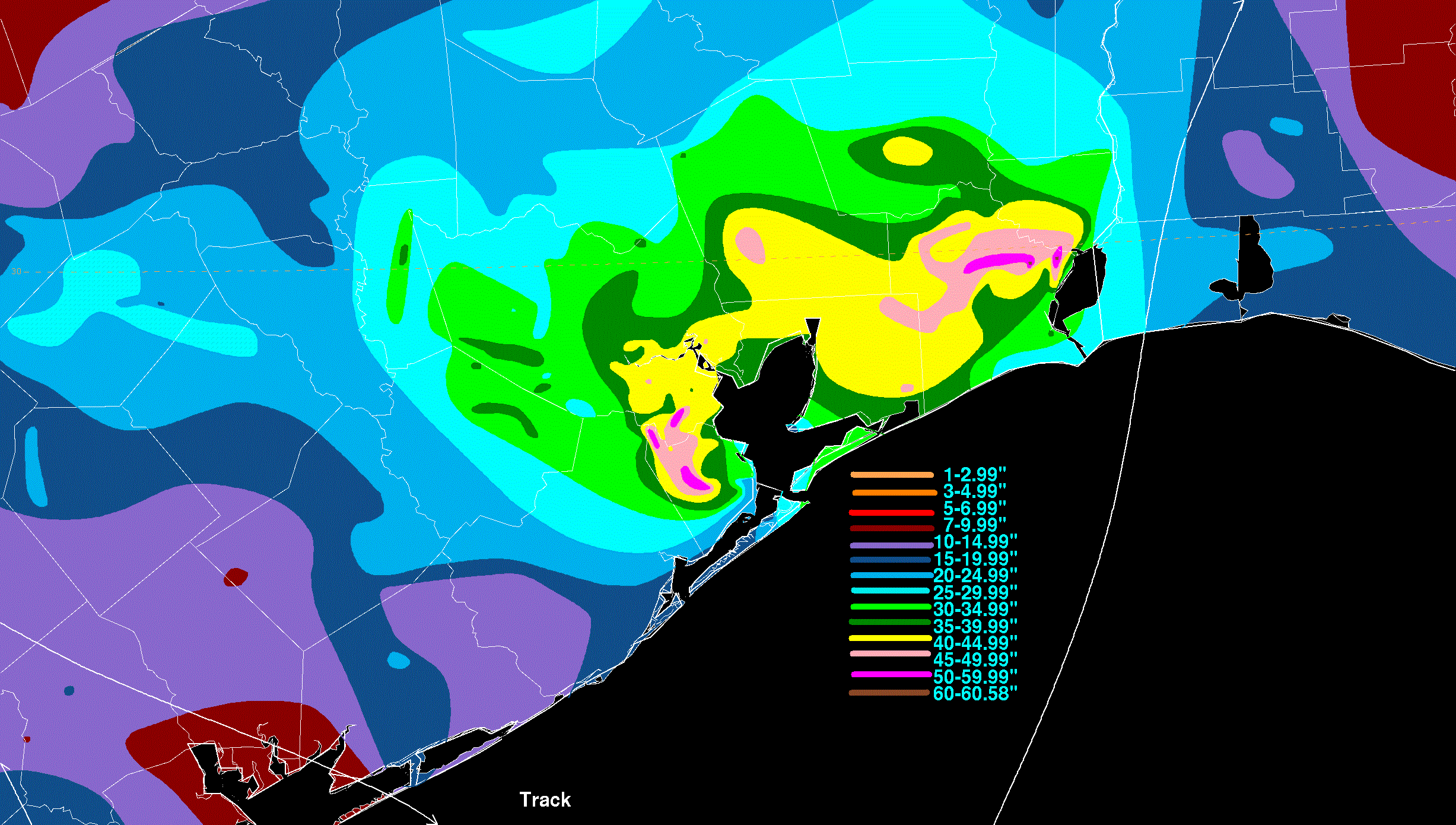
The same map focused on the area that got the most rainfall

Hurricane Harvey stalled over southeastern Texas, dropping over fifty inches of rain in some places, causing major flooding, especially in the Houston metropolitan area and the Beaumont–Port Arthur metropolitan area.

At least 70 individuals died from the storm, and over 80% of Hurricane Harvey's death toll was associated with drowning. More than 70% of deaths in Houston occurred outside of the city's designated flood risk areas.

=== 2018 Ohio River floods ===
After a tornado outbreak in late February, flooding occurred along the Ohio River, which crested at 60.53 feet (18.45 m), the 22nd highest in recorded history and highest since 1997. This flooding caused six people to die. Damage totalled $500 million. In September 2018, record rainfalls caused extensive flash flooding, with one casualty reported.

=== April 2018 Hawaii floods ===
In April 2018, a series of thunderstorms produced record-breaking rainfall on the Hawaiian Islands of Kauaʻi and Oahu. An upper-level low moved across the area on April 13, generating a mesoscale convective system that moved over eastern Oahu, producing localized heavy rainfall that reached 5.55 in (141 mm).

=== August 2018 Hawaii floods ===
Hurricane Lane produced record-breaking rain across the Hawaiian Islands. The resulting floods and landslides caused extensive damage and one fatality. More than 3,000 insurance claims for damage were made statewide and total economic losses exceeded $250 million. Accumulations were greatest along the eastern slopes of Mauna Loa with a maximum of 58 in (1,473 mm) at Kahūnā Falls in Akaka Falls State Park, as measured by a private weather station. This made Lane the wettest tropical cyclone on record in the state of Hawaii, surpassing the previous peak of 52 in (1,300 mm) during Hurricane Hiki in 1950. Lane's peak rainfall total was also the second-highest recorded from a tropical cyclone within the United States, surpassed only by Hurricane Harvey in the preceding year.

=== September 2018 Carolinas floods ===
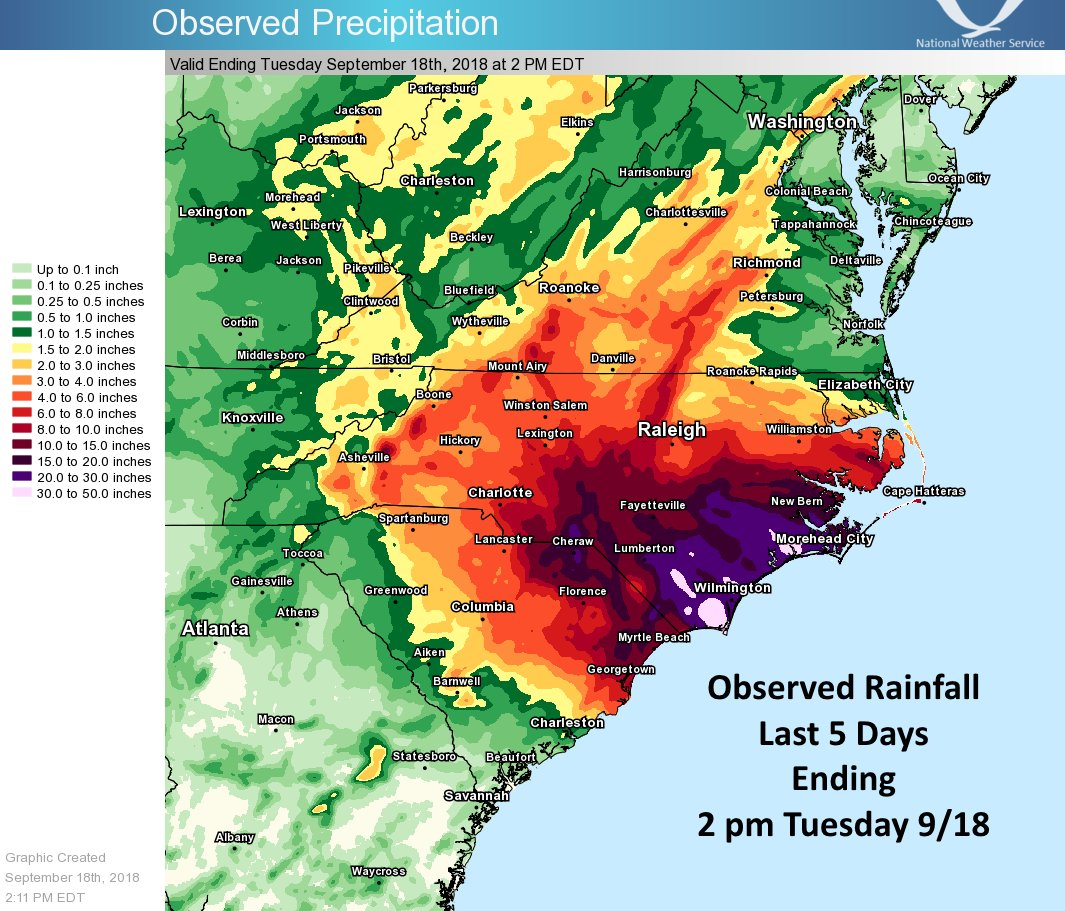

A combination of storm surge flooding and rainfall, over two and a half feet in some parts of North Carolina, when Hurricane Florence stalled over southeastern North Carolina led to severe flooding, with some rivers cresting almost two weeks after Florence's landfall.

=== Mississippi River Floods of 2019 ===
The conterminous United States recorded the wettest meteorological winter (December 2018 – February 2019) during the 1895–2019 period of record. Most portions of the Mississippi River experienced significant, prolonged flooding during the winter, spring, and summer of 2019. The duration of flooding exceeded records set by the Great Mississippi Flood of 1927 at some locations along the Lower Mississippi River. The Bonnet Carre' Spillway was operated for the first time in two consecutive years and operated twice in the same year for the first time.

=== March 2019 Nebraska floods ===
64 of 93 counties in Nebraska declared a state of emergency and at least three people died. 14 bridges needed replacing or major work.

== 2020s ==
=== 2020 Southeast Alaska floods ===
According to National Weather Service in Juneau, December 1, 2020, was a recording-breaking day. A single-day rainfall caused flooding and landslides in the region, where around 2,000 people resided. Four houses were destroyed and two people died. The U.S. Coast Guard sent a helicopter and boat to the location for avoiding further damages. Damage amounted to nearly $30 million from the storm.

=== March 2021 Nashville floods ===
In Nashville, heavy rainfall caused a flash-flood, killing 6 men in their sixties and seventies and 1 woman in her forties. It was reported that most of the fatalities occurred while the victims were in their cars.

=== March 2021 Hawaii floods ===
In March 2021, a cut off upper-level low brought torrential rainfall to Hawaii, triggering severe flooding across the islands of Oahu, Maui, and Kauai.

=== May 2021 Alabama floods ===
In early May 2021, in Alabama and the Southeastern United States, a deluge caused moderate flooding and spawned at least three tornadoes. After the deluge had passed, it was reported that there had been no fatalities, but that damage occurred in Georgia, Texas, Alabama, Mississippi and Virginia, and that debris must be cleaned up when it is safe to do so, and the waterline has receded to manageable levels. It was reported that Alabama received as much rain as they normally would in one month, during the span of a single day.

=== May 2021 Louisiana floods ===
Rainfall in the areas around Lake Charles, Louisiana caused severe flooding, and killed four people. 3 people were found to have drowned in their cars, and another person drowned after crashing their car into a ditch. A flood warning was issued by Baton Rouge authorities. Torrential rains were recorded to have been at three times the normal level, and water levels in the region are the third highest they've been since flood records started in the area in 1895. The water levels are seconded only by the effects of Hurricane Delta in 2020.

=== June 2021 Southeastern Michigan flood ===
Late on June 25 into early June 26 an rainband set up across Washtenaw County and Wayne County, the local weather radar estimated that some areas in Detroit received 6 in (150 mm) of rain. Local highways like Interstate 75, Interstate 94, and Interstate 96 were flooded, and hundreds of cars were left stranded, also some basements of people's homes in the area flooded.

=== July 2021 Bucks County flood ===
On July 12, heavy rainfall across southeastern Pennsylvania and New Jersey, mainly Bucks County. Cities including Bensalem, Croydon, and Bristol Township experienced flash flooding, caused by many inches of rain. The residents at Lafayette Condos in Bensalem had to be evacuated from their homes. Portions of PA-63, US 13, and the Vine Street Expressway shut down. In addition, SEPTA had to suspend their Wilmington, Trenton, and Chestnut Hill West rail lines.

=== July 2021 Arizona flood ===
On July 14, flash flooding occurred in Flagstaff, Coconino County, Arizona. The flooding was worsened by ground softening caused by recent and ongoing wildfires in Arizona, and in the United States, which in turn, were sparked by a heatwave and drought. One woman was killed after she was swept up in a current, as she was rafting in the Grand Canyon. Flagstaff declared a state of emergency due to the unexpected amount of flooding.

=== August 2021 Tennessee floods ===
On the morning of August 21, storms riding along a stationary front in western Middle Tennessee produced widespread flash flooding across the counties of Stewart, Houston, Dickson, Humphreys, and Hickman. Especially hard hit were the towns of McEwen and Waverly in Humphreys County, where many homes and businesses were destroyed by floodwaters along Trace Creek. Twenty people were killed throughout Humphreys County from the flooding.

=== September 2021 Northeastern United States floods ===
The extratropical remnants of Ida producing flash flooding and severe weather across the Northeastern United States.

On September 1–2, 2021, Hurricane Ida affected much of the Northeastern United States as an extratropical cyclone, causing catastrophic river and flash flooding. Widespread flooding affected many areas, shutting down numerous roads, halting public transit, and cancelling hundreds of flights. Several rivers overflowed their banks, flooding farmlands, towns, and homes. Hundreds of cars were abandoned on roadways after being stranded in floodwaters and dozens of high-water rescues were performed. Several flash flood emergencies were issued due to the flooding.

The storm also produced a tornado outbreak that spawned seven tornadoes across Pennsylvania and New Jersey along with an additional weak tornado in Massachusetts. In Pennsylvania, an EF2 tornado caused severe damage and a fatality in Upper Dublin Township. One intense EF3 tornado passed near Mullica Hill, New Jersey damaging or destroying several homes. The same storm later produced EF1 tornado that tracked from Edgewater Park, New Jersey to Bristol, Pennsylvania and prompted a rare tornado emergency for both Bristol and Croydon, Pennsylvania, as well as Burlington, New Jersey. This was the first tornado emergency ever issued for a tropical cyclone as well as the first ever issued for the Northeastern United States.

At least 55 people died in the states of New Jersey, New York, Pennsylvania, Maryland, and Connecticut. CoreLogic estimated that Ida caused an estimated $16 to 24 billion in flooding damage in the Northeastern United States. The National Hurricane Center (NHC) estimated that Ida caused between $18 billion to $22.5 billion in damage in the Northeastern United States, with a median estimate of at least $20 billion in damages.

=== June 2022 Montana floods ===
Large areas of Montana, including Yellowstone National Park, were affected by heavy flooding in June 2022. The flooding resulted in $29 million in damage, and killed one person. Severe snowmelt in combination with 0.8–5 inches of rain caused the Yellowstone River to reach a record height of 14.72 feet.

=== July–August 2022 nationwide floods ===
Beginning on July 24, 2022, and lasting for a week, many flash flooding events hit several areas of the United States. These areas included parts of Missouri and Illinois, especially Greater St. Louis, Eastern Kentucky, Southwest Virginia, parts of West Virginia, and the Las Vegas Valley. Several rounds of severe thunderstorms began in Missouri on July 24, culminating during July 25 and 26, when St. Louis broke its previous 1915 record for the most rainfall in a span of 24 hours. Governor Mike Parson declared a state of emergency on July 26. Over one hundred people were rescued from floods, and two people were killed. Late on July 27 and into July 28, historic flooding began in central Appalachia, particularly in Kentucky, where a state of emergency was declared. A total of 38 people were killed in Kentucky as a direct result of flooding, with a 39th fatality occurring days later during cleanup efforts and a 40th coming in September during cleanup efforts in Pike County.

Late July 28, another unprecedented flash flooding event occurred in Las Vegas after parts of the city saw over an inch of rainfall. Much of the Las Vegas Strip became inundated, with roads, casinos, and parking garages being affected and flights being delayed or cancelled. More flooding continued from July 30 to August 1 in Arizona, including Phoenix and Flagstaff, California, including Death Valley National Park, and again in the same areas of Eastern Kentucky. In all, 41 people were killed during the flooding events: 39 in Kentucky on July 28 and 2 in Missouri on July 26.

More flooding events continued throughout August, impacting areas such as Death Valley, the Dallas–Fort Worth metroplex, and central Mississippi. A flash flood in Zion National Park in Utah led to one fatality. The Dallas flooding on August 22 led to an additional fatality and four injuries.

=== December 2022-March 2023 California floods ===
Periods of heavy rainfall caused by multiple atmospheric rivers in California between December 31, 2022, and March 25, 2023, resulted in floods that affected parts of Southern California, the California Central Coast, Northern California and Nevada. The flooding resulted in property damage and at least 22 fatalities. At least 200,000 homes and business lost power during the December–January storms and 6,000 individuals were ordered to evacuate.

The floods were widely reported by media as an example of how climate change is increasing extreme changes in weather, especially cycles of precipitation and drought. Scientists interviewed by Los Angeles Times said that further study is needed to determine the connection and California has recorded similar events almost every decade since records started in the 19th century. Other scientists have emphasized that floods were caused by ocean warming, directly related to climate change. Scientist Kevin Trenberth declared that "the interaction between the warming ocean and the overlying atmosphere (...) is producing these prodigious rainfalls that have occurred in so many places around the world recently". Climate change is intensifying the water cycle. This brings more intense rainfall and associated flooding, as well as more intense drought in many regions. It has been both predicted by scientists and observed in the last years and documented by the IPCC (International Panel for Climate Change 6th assessment report). Before the rains started, California had been in an extreme drought.

Due to the storms, Governor Gavin Newsom declared a state of emergency on January 4, 2023. President Joe Biden then declared a state of emergency in 17 California counties on January 9, 2023. That same day, two lawmakers sent a letter urging President Biden to declare a state of emergency for San Luis Obispo County and Santa Barbara County. Biden approved a major disaster declaration for Santa Cruz, Sacramento and Merced counties on January 14. Monterey, San Luis Obispo and Santa Barbara counties were added a few days later to the declaration. Later, Ventura County was approved disaster relief. Biden surveyed the damage with Newsom on January 19.

=== 2023 Desert Southwest floods ===
Between May 27 to June 7, numerous days of heavy rain led to extreme flooding across the Southwestern United States, which would later be classified as a “historic” flooding event by the National Weather Service. In the Amarillo metropolitan area, over 15 inches (380 mm) of rain fell. Over 200 people had to be evacuated in the city of Amarillo. Several homes were completely destroyed by the floods. The Canadian River reached moderate level flood stage, peaking at 10.53 feet (3.21 m), over 3 feet (0.91 m) above flood stage.

=== July 2023 Northeast floods ===
The July 2023 Northeastern United States floods, also known as the Great Vermont Flood of 10–11 July 2023 in Vermont, was a destructive and significant flash flood event occurring in the Northeastern United States from July 9 to 29, 2023. Slow-moving showers and thunderstorms produced heavy rainfall and flooding, which led to widespread damage across multiple states in the Mid-Atlantic, with the heaviest and most destructive flash flooding centered around northern New England, specifically Vermont. Across the affected areas, numerous roads and bridges were washed out, and dozens of water rescues were conducted. Widespread rainfall amounts of 5 inches (130 mm) fell across the Northeast, with the maximum amount of rainfall occurring in Putnam Valley, New York, with 10.49 inches (266 mm). On July 15, seven people were killed due to flash flooding in Upper Makefield Township in Bucks County. Up to 7 in (180 mm) of rain fell down in 45 minutes in the surrounding area. Pennsylvania Route 532, the road where the accident occurred, shut down for two weeks following the flooding.

=== July 2023 Western Kentucky floods ===
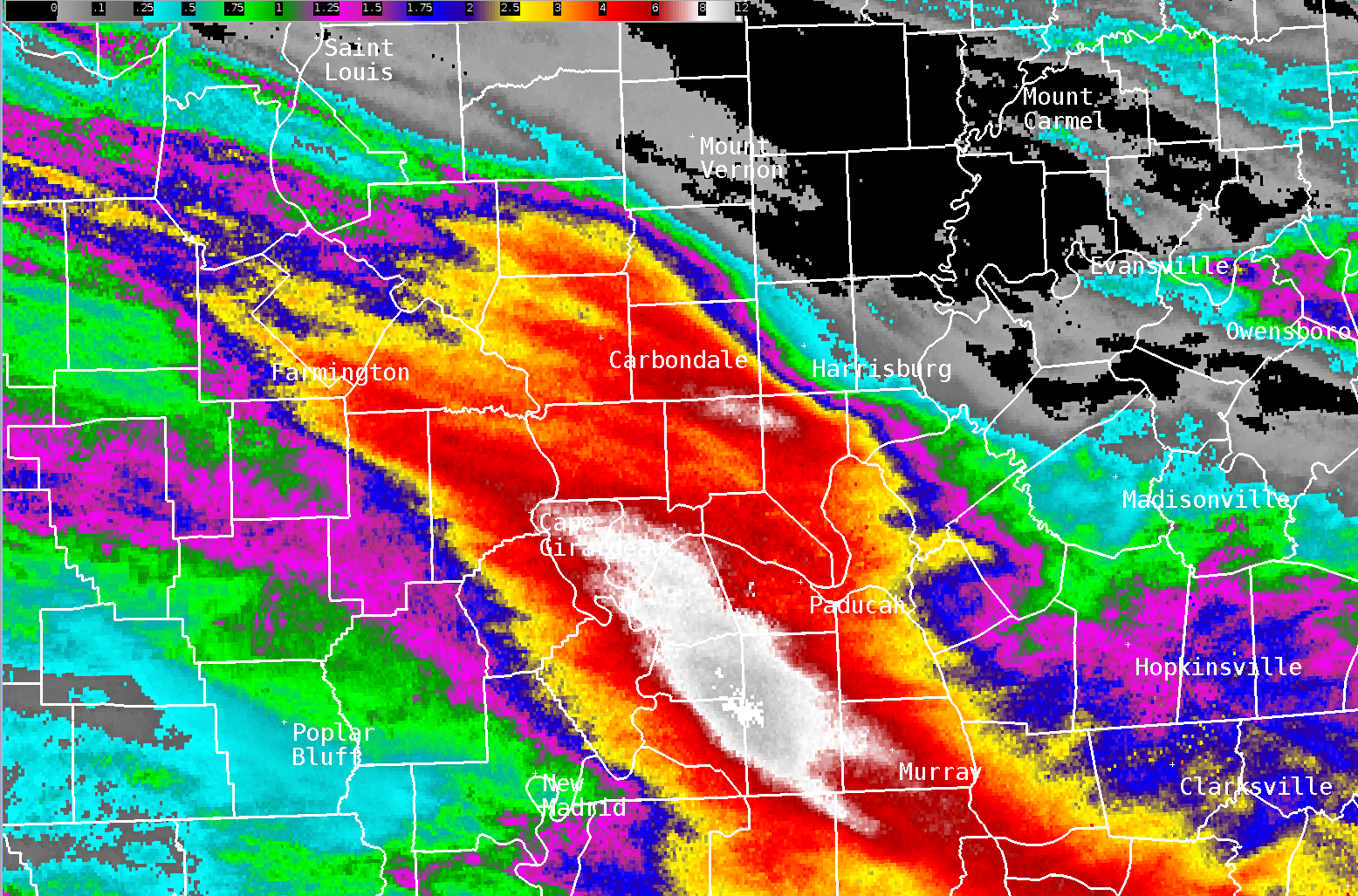
Map of rainfall totals across NWS Paducah's area of responsibility (western Kentucky, southern Illinois, and southeastern Missouri) for the period July 18–19

In a two-day period from July 18 to July 19, 2023, significant flooding occurred across western portions of Kentucky, southern Illinois, southeastern Missouri, and northwestern Tennessee caused by stalled heavy thunderstorms which brought high rainfall rates to numerous locations across western Kentucky. The flooding event also inundated locations previously hit by the 2021 Western Kentucky tornado. Numerous homes were flooded across western Kentucky, and several flash flood emergencies were issued for locations in western Kentucky and southern Illinois as well.

Showers and thunderstorms developed ahead of a mesoscale convective system along a low-level convergent axis on the afternoon of July 18 across portions of southeast Missouri. Favorable precipitable water values around 1.7-1.9 inches, along with wind shear around 50-60 knots, and most-unstable convective available potential energy (CAPE) in the 2000 values, yielded conditions for the developed thunderstorms to intensify and produce heavy rainfall. The next day, a moderate risk of excessive rainfall was issued by the Weather Prediction Center, and a flood watch was issued for Kentucky, Illinois, Tennessee, and Missouri. Convection initiated in the vicinity of the Tri-state area in the early morning hours of July 19, and precipitable water values increased from the previous day to 1.8-2.3 inches, and a strong boundary layer moisture convergence from an isentropic ascent, combined with the same CAPE values from the previous day, allowed a strong low level jet and training convection to rapidly increase in coverage across central Missouri and head southeastward along a stationary front, causing heavy rainfall. Another mesoscale convective system developed several hours later, leading to additional high rates of rainfall. Convection continued to form on the afternoon of July 19 as 850-millibar inflow at 20-30 knots and favorable thermodyamics led to additional rainfall across southeast Missouri, southern Illinois, western Kentucky, and northwest Tennessee.

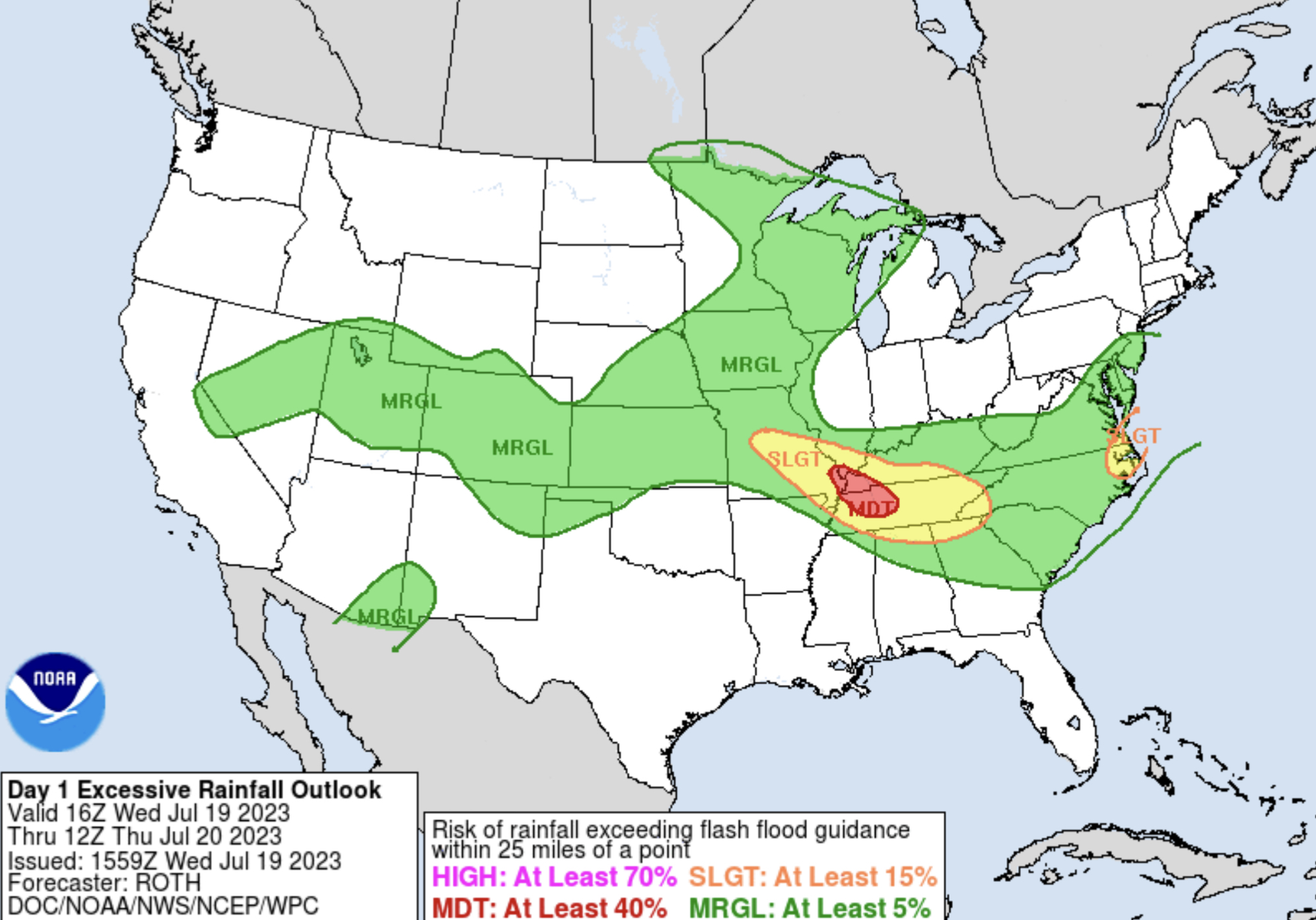
The Weather Prediction Center's excessive rainfall outlook for July 19.

Numerous homes were flooded in Mayfield and Wingo. Cars were submerged on flooded roads in Graves County. Portions of I-69, the Purchase Parkway, and KY 80 were flooded. Flash flood warnings were issued for western Kentucky, southern Illinois, southeastern Missouri, and northwestern Tennessee, including Carbondale, Illinois, Cape Girardeau, Missouri, and Paris, Tennessee. Rare flash flood emergencies were issued for Mayfield, Paducah, Fancy Farm, and surrounding areas, and included areas impacted by the 2021 Western Kentucky tornado. As a result, this was the first time flash flood emergencies were issued from the National Weather Service in Paducah, Kentucky for the Jackson Purchase region of the state. Additional flash flood emergencies were also issued for LaCenter, Kentucky, and Mounds, Illinois, and as far north as Karnak, Illinois. Crop losses also occurred in western Kentucky, and power outages peaked at 19,433 during the flood event. 1 person was injured and six water rescues were completed in Graves County. Near Mayfield, 11.28 inches (287 mm) of rain fell, setting a new record rainfall in Kentucky. 6.9 inches (180 mm) of rainfall fell in Paducah, Kentucky, which was the second—highest daily record there. The event was also considered a 1 in a 1,000-year event.

Kentucky Governor Andy Beshear declared a state of emergency for Mayfield and surrounding areas, and toured the flooded areas. Local emergencies were declared in Carlisle, Fulton, Graves, Hickman, and Lee counties in Kentucky, and also in the cities of Arlington, Bardwell, Clinton, Cumberland, and Mayfield. Western Kentucky University offered free early move-ins to summer housing for flood victims. Damage assessments by the Kentucky Emergency Management Agency were completed in 47 buildings, including 41 homes and 6 businesses. A shelter was opened for displaced residents following the disaster.

=== August 2023 mid-south U.S. floods ===
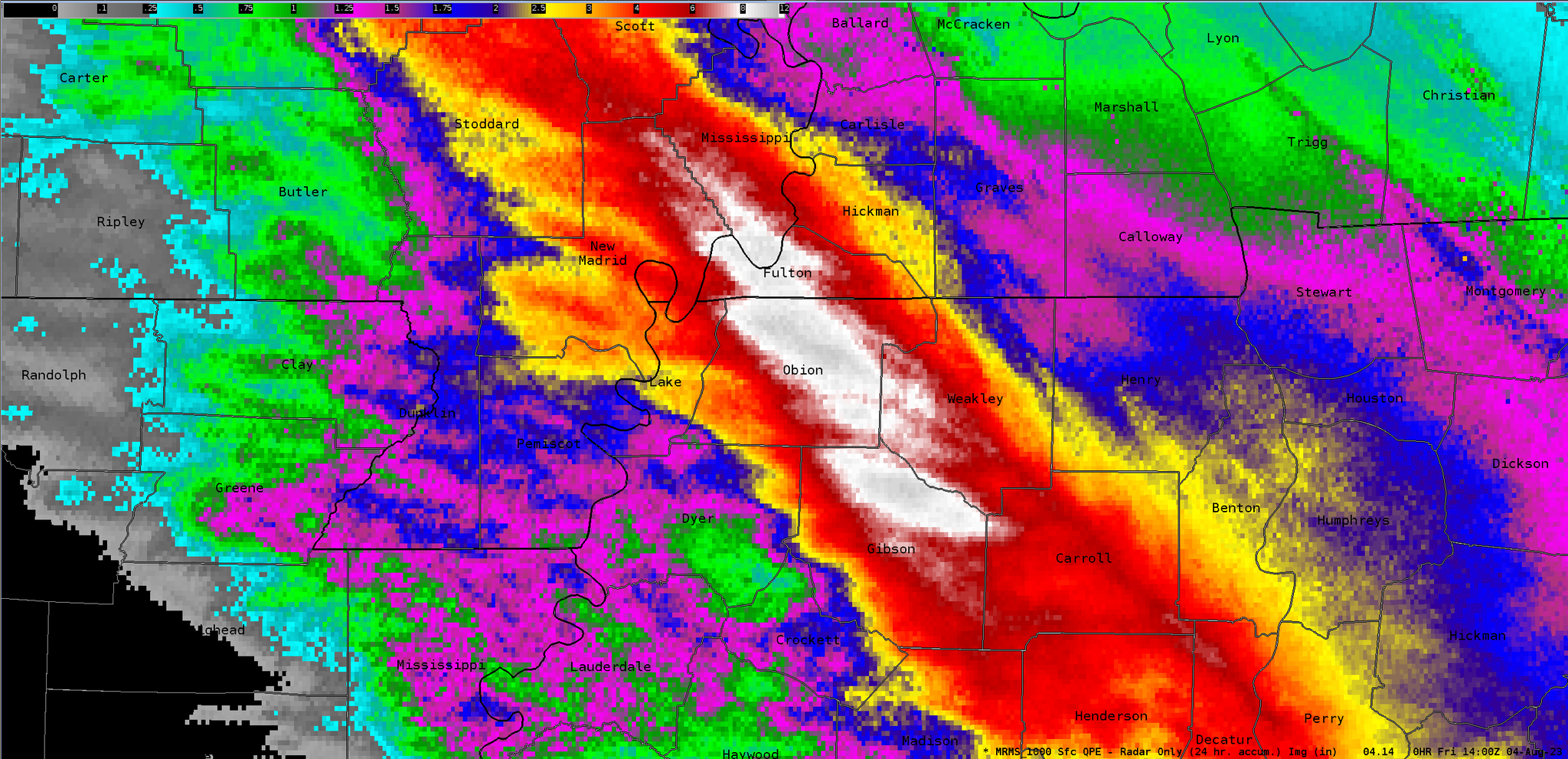
Map of rainfall totals across the National Weather Service Memphis, Tennessee area of responsibility (northwestern Tennessee, southwestern Kentucky, southeastern Missouri) for the period August 3–4

In a three-day period from August 2–4, 2023, significant flooding occurred across northwestern Tennessee, southwestern Kentucky, and southeastern Missouri in the United States. Two flash flood emergencies were issued, and water rescues and evacuations were prompted, including rescues at a mobile home park in Union City, Tennessee. Downtown Hickman, Kentucky, was impacted by a mudslide which led to a road closure for a road leading to the town.

In the early morning hours of August 2, convection developed across northern Missouri in an increased low-level convergence zone, precipitable water values around 2 inches, and a moist, moderately unstable airmass with most-unstable convective available potential energy (CAPE) around 2000 j/kg. The strengthening low-level convergence zone paralleled a west-northwesterly flow aloft, allowing training convection to occur. The convection then merged into a mesoscale convective system several hours later with the convection spreading from southwestern Iowa to southeastern Missouri with abundant moisture and convective instability, along with a strong low-level convergence zone, sustaining the convection, causing heavy rainfall across portions of eastern Missouri and southern Iowa. Shortly thereafter, the mesoscale convective system then expanded into eastern Nebraska, caused by a low level jet, as additional convection developed with a thermodynamic advection occurring. The low level jet then moved to the east and weakened, which caused the convection to dissipate. Thereafter, on the evening hours, a frontal boundary over central Kansas, along with a humid and moist airmass and instability in southern Missouri, allowed convection to develop and produce heavy rainfall across central Missouri, and west of the Greater St. Louis area as a high risk of excessive rainfall was issued. Training showers and thunderstorms developed across portions of southeastern Missouri and southern Illinois along an elevated convergence axis zone as it moved southeastward towards southwestern Indiana and western Kentucky. On August 3, mesoscale convective vortex was present along the training convection which caused flash flooding across southeastern Missouri, southern Illinois, western Kentucky, and northwestern Tennessee as the mesovortex moved southeastward. Areas along an isentropic lift above a surface front received heavy rainfall across western Kentucky, southern Illinois, and southeastern Missouri, and high precipitable water values from 2 to 2.4 inches and convective instability between 1000 and 2000 j/kg also supported heavy rainfall. Late in the morning, a second mesoscale convective system moved through areas that had already received flash flooding, causing additional heavy rainfall as the MCS weakened and moved southeastward. Additional factors, including a convergence boundary, precipitable water values around 1.8 inches, and moisture/convective instability all contributed to rainfall rates around 2 inches (51 mm) per hour and causing flash flooding. In the early morning hours of August 4, additional showers and thunderstorms developed in a corridor extending from central Missouri to northern Alabama due to an increased convective instability, a surface stationary front located over Memphis, Tennessee, and a deep-layer mean flow which resulted in repeating rounds of thunderstorms that moved southeastward over the same areas which had already received heavy rainfall. The convective activity led to flash flooding across Union City, Tennessee, and soon moved into portions of northern Alabama, causing flooding across roadways in the state and in Oneonta, Alabama. Water rescues and evacuations occurred at a mobile home park in Union City, Tennessee, where more than two dozen people were rescued, including by boat. Union City was also flooded. Search-and-rescue operations were conducted in Obion County, Tennessee. Businesses, including a Lowe's store, were flooded in southwest portions of Union City. Flooding forced Obion County Schools to cancel classes on August 4. The National Weather Service in Memphis, Tennessee called the flooding in Union City and surrounding areas "catastrophic". A portion of Interstate 40 was closed. 11.49 inches (292 mm) of rain fell in Union City, which prompted a flash flood emergency. Firefighters in Rives pumped out floodwaters, and utilized drones to display the flooding situation. Roads in Dyer, Jackson, and Trenton were flooded, and Jackson, Madison, and Gibson counties in Tennessee had roads were flooded as well. Flooding also occurred in Weakley, Crockett, and Greene counties in Tennessee. Memphis was also under a flood advisory. St. Francois State Park was temporarily closed due to flooding. Flash flood emergencies were issued for Union City, and Hickman, Kentucky. Mudslides also occurred in downtown Hickman, sliding onto roads, which led to closures, including a closure on Kentucky Route 94, a road which led to downtown Hickman. Several evacuations occurred in Fulton County, Kentucky. Portions of Missouri received heavy rainfall, including Columbia, Missouri, receiving 3.77 inches (96 mm) on August 3, breaking a 113-year record. Portions of Sikeston and Chaffee flooded, with the latter location including nearby a high school. Roads were flooded across numerous counties in Missouri. The Missouri River 340 ended as a result of heavy rain, which caused the river's water level to rise, posing a hazard. Hundreds of power outages occurred across the state. Water rescues and flooded roads also occurred in Kirksville, inundating vehicles and stranding drivers. Gerald received nearly 4 inches (100 mm) in 30 minutes according to the Gerald-Rosebud Fire Protection District, flooding basements and cars and prompting a water rescue. U.S. Route 50 was flooded. In Alabama, roads, including U.S. Route 231 and Alabama State Route 75, in Oneonta were flooded, forcing emergency management to rescue several people from their cars. Floodwaters also entered businesses in Oneonta.

The Obion County Emergency Management Agency will partner with an agency in Kentucky to provide temporary housing for flood victims. Shelters were opened in Union City, Tennessee as well. The Tennessee Highway Patrol assisted with the Obion County Sheriff and Union City law enforcement. Flood recovery efforts also started in Sikeston, Missouri. The Salvation Army and a nonprofit organization from western Kentucky responded to the floods, assisting flood victims.

=== Mid-September 2023 Northeast floods ===
In a six-day period from September 8 to September 13, 2023, slow-moving thunderstorms associated with a low-pressure area caused flash flooding across multiple states across the Northeastern and Mid-Atlantic regions of the United States. A stationary front, combined with a convergence zone, caused significant flooding, prompting the National Weather Service to issue multiple flash flood warnings and two flash flood emergencies, one for the city of Leominster, Massachusetts, and the other for the Baltimore, Maryland, area. Several minor injuries occurred during the severe weather event, and hundreds of homes and vehicles were flooded. Evacuations also occurred after concerns of a compromised dam near a neighborhood of Leominster, and all schools in the city were closed the day after the floods. Massachusetts governor Maura Healey declared a state of emergency for Leominster and North Attleborough following the floods.

=== Late September 2023 New York floods ===
On September 29, 2023, heavy rainfall led to flooding across portions of the New York metropolitan area and surrounding areas in the United States. The floods were caused by a low-pressure area that had absorbed the remnants of Tropical Storm Ophelia, which then stalled over the New York City area. Multiple rounds of heavy rainfall also moved through the region as a result of favorable precipitable water values, convective instability, and low-level winds. This induced high rainfall totals across northwestern New Jersey, southeastern New York, and southwestern Connecticut, with the highest total reaching 9.80 inches (249 mm) in Park Slope, Brooklyn.

The flooding inundated numerous highways and roads, and affecting all New York City Subway service, suspending and delaying routes and services. Additionally, Amtrak, Metro-North Railroad, and NYC Ferry services were delayed or suspended, and airports across the New York City area experienced service disruptions and flight delays and cancellations, including both a terminal being flooded and a ground stop implemented at LaGuardia Airport. Several attractions, including the Alamo Drafthouse in three locations and the Prospect Park Zoo, were closed as a result of the flooding. Heavy rainfall inundated schools and forced multiple festivals to be postponed across the affected areas. Flooding also occurred across numerous towns and municipalities across New Jersey and Connecticut, causing the Housatonic River to swell in western portions of the latter state.

In the aftermath of the flooding, New York governor Kathy Hochul declared a state of emergency for the five boroughs of New York City, as well as portions of the Hudson Valley and Long Island. New York City mayor Eric Adams and Hoboken, New Jersey mayor Ravinder Bhalla also declared states of emergency, while New Jersey governor Phil Murphy declared a state of emergency for all 21 counties in the state. Damage from the floods were estimated at $100 million.

=== December 2023 Eastern United States floods ===
On December 16, heavy rainfall affected Central Florida, with all 7 climate sites breaking daily rainfall records. Powerful winds also affected Florida, with a peak gust of 61 mph (98 km/h) in West Palm Beach. Flooding resulted in 11,000 power outages in Florida. The next day, record rain struck the Charleston metropolitan area, South Carolina, with over 3 in (76 mm) of rain. Further north around Myrtle Beach, South Carolina, a flash flood emergency was issued with some areas receiving over 13 in (330 mm) of rain. The storm also brought the 4th highest tide to Charleston Harbor. The storm also resulted in 31,000 power outages in South Carolina, with 14,000 people losing power in North Carolina. The storm moved up the coast from December 17 into the 18th, causing major flooding in the Northeastern United States. In the Northeast, over 400 flights were canceled and 1400 delayed, with a ground stop imposed at Boston Logan International Airport. Over 600,000 customers lost power in the Northeast, and a travel advisory issued in New York City. 300,000 power outages were in Maine alone. The Salisbury Zoo closed due to flooding. The Port Washington Branch of the Long Island Rail Road had a partial suspension, with delays on the New Jersey Transit as well. High winds also resulted in the Verrazzano–Narrows Bridge closing down. The storm resulted in two fatalities. Damage from the storm totaled $1.3 billion.

=== June 2024 Midwest Floods ===
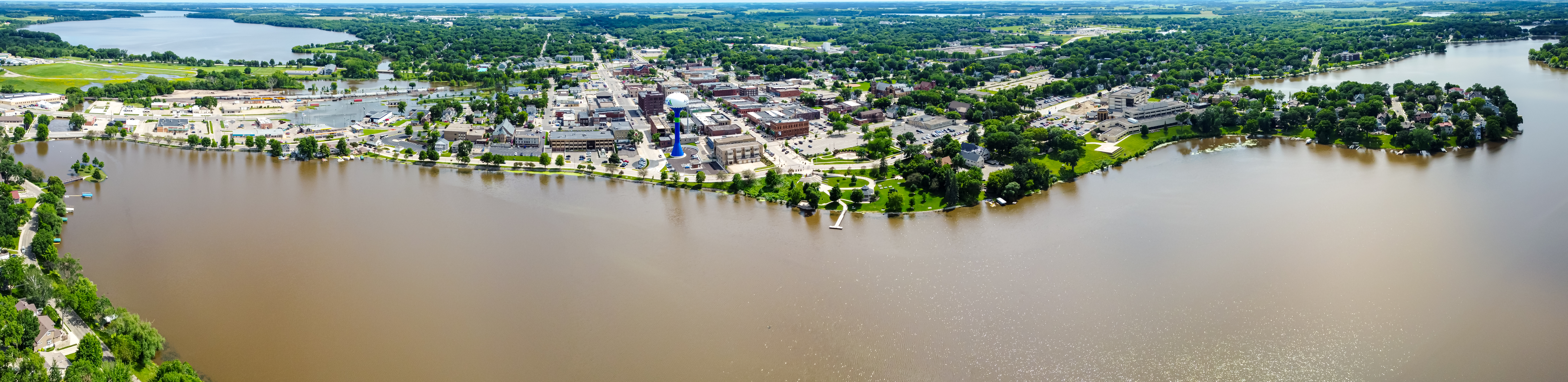
Major flooding in Albert Lea, Minnesota in June 2024

Persistent heavy rainfall along the Missouri River resulted in catastrophic flooding in June 2024.

=== July 2024 Illinois Floods ===
In Illinois, a sequence of rainfall events fueled by a ring of fire caused flooding in Rockford, Illinois, killing one, and the partial failure of a dam in Nashville, Illinois. Two more fatalities were confirmed near Elsah, Illinois.

=== Early August 2024 Northeast floods ===
On August 6, before Hurricane Debby moved through the region, the Northeast was hit with intense flooding. Prior to the storm, New York City used drones to notify residents of low-lying areas of the impending flooding as part of a new warning system developed after Hurricane Ida. Standing water on several highways in the Bronx, such as the Major Deegan Expressway and Cross Bronx Expressway led to severe traffic jams. Flooding in the Bronx also resulted in the New York Yankees game being postponed. The Bronx recorded the highest rainfall totals across the city, with up to 5.38 in (137 mm) of rain. Portions of Teterboro, New Jersey were left underwater due to the floods. The Morris & Essex Lines were suspended between Dover and Summit, New Jersey due to the flooding. Ground stops occurred at Philadelphia International Airport, John F. Kennedy International Airport, LaGuardia Airport and Newark Liberty International Airport. Over 13,000 customers lost power during the floods.

=== Mid-August 2024 Northeast floods ===
On August 18, destructive flash flooding affected the Northeast. The state of Connecticut was hit particularly hard, with two fatalities in Oxford and over 100 rescues. The Waterbury Branch was suspended during the storm, and 27 roads experienced closures for a significant amount of time. Up to 10 in (250 mm) of rain fell in parts of the state, triggering a flash flood emergency for some locations. Dozens of people were rescued from Kettletown State Park. Further south, major flooding resulted in another flash flood emergency in Suffolk County, New York, with Stony Brook recording 3.5 in (89 mm) of rain in one hour and an event total of over 9 in (230 mm). That prompted a move in delay at Stony Brook University. Damage in Suffolk County was estimated at $50 million. John F. Kennedy International Airport, LaGuardia Airport and Newark Liberty International Airport imposed ground stops during the storms. In Central Park, 2.43 in (62 mm) of rain fell, and 86th Street closed. Amtrak suspended all service from New York City to Philadelphia due to the storms.

=== October 2024 New Mexico flood ===
During the evening hours of October 19, 2024, excessive rainfall caused historic and deadly flash flooding in the city of Roswell, New Mexico.

=== November 2–5, 2024 Missouri floods ===
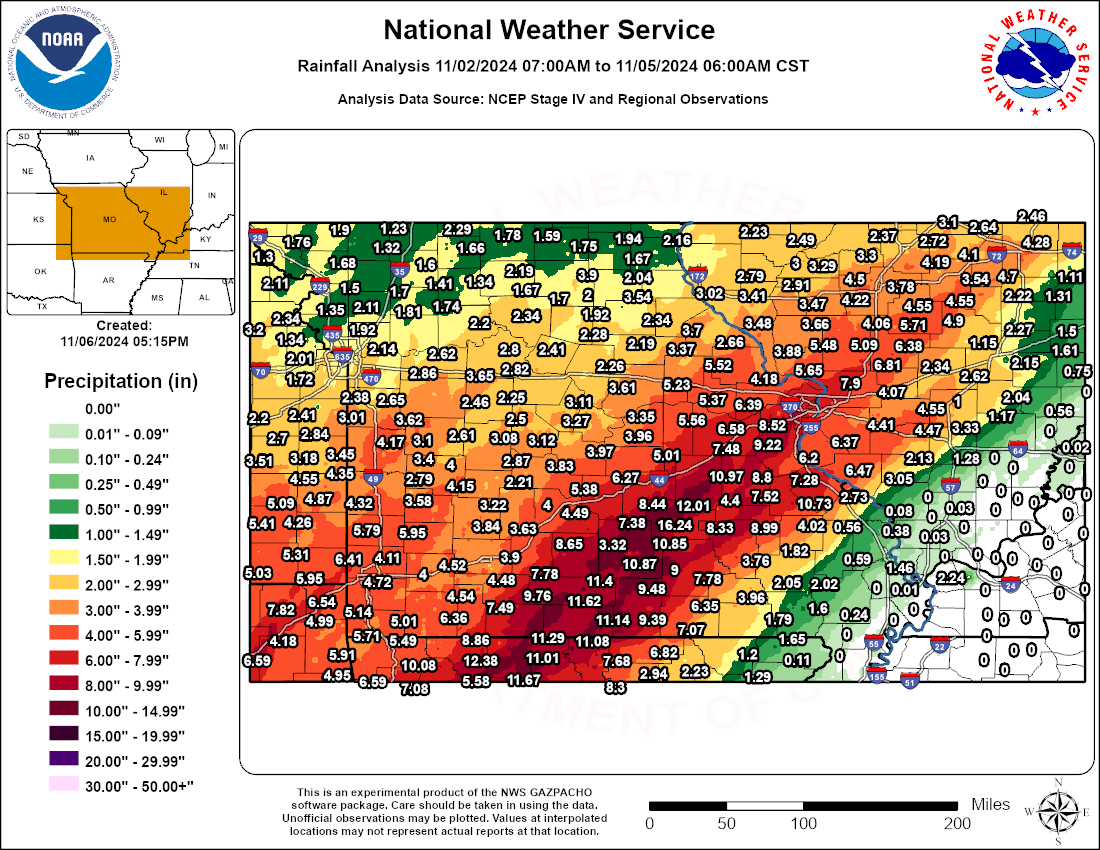
Rainfall totals between November 2 and 5, 2024 over Missouri and surrounding states

Significant flooding occurred across Missouri as a result of the storm system. St. Louis Lambert International Airport experienced record rainfall, with 3.89 in (9.9 cm) falling on November 5, far exceeding the previous record of 1.62 in (4.1 cm) from 1956, also exceeding the November maximum daily rainfall record set the day previous at 3.75 in (9.5 cm), which itself broke a longstanding 1921 record of 3.56 in (9.0 cm). Rivers across the state experienced "extreme rises" in their water levels, with the Meramec River forecasted to remain above major flood stage for days after the event. West of Salem, Missouri, 48 hour rainfall totals reached 18.52 in (470 mm). St. Louis saw record November rainfall from the storms. Near Akers, Missouri, the Current River was estimated to reach a record flood stage of 32 feet (9.8 m) (the gauge stopped reporting after reaching 23.23 feet (7.08 m)), exceeding the location's previous record level of 26.08 feet (7.95 m). Significant damage occurred at Pulltite, where water levels at the campground exceeded the height of the Pulltite Ranger Station, sweeping away the picnic pavilion, removing the amphitheater from its foundation, and causing significant damage to campground roadways.

In all, flooding across the state killed five, with three perishing near Gravois Creek. The bodies of two poll workers for the November 5 elections were found around 4:30 am on the morning of November 5, having been caught in flooding at Beaver Creek over four hours earlier.

=== February 15–16, 2025 floods ===
From February 15–16, 2025, a storm system brought flash flooding and tornadoes that impacted parts of the United States, leaving at least 18 people dead. The flash flooding occurred in Kentucky, West Virginia, Tennessee, and Virginia.

=== May 2025 Mid-Atlantic United States flood ===
A significant flood affected parts of the Mid-Atlantic region of the eastern United States in May 2025. A slow-moving weather system began in the southeast and moved north, causing flash flooding from western North Carolina and the Piedmont region of central Virginia to south-central Pennsylvania. Flooding occurred primarily in communities along the Potomac River and its tributaries, beginning on May 13.

=== July 4–7, 2025 Texas floods ===
On July 4, 2025, destructive and deadly flooding took place in the Hill Country region of the U.S. state of Texas. During the flooding, water levels along the Guadalupe River rose rapidly. As a result, 136 people were killed and 3 remain missing, with 117 of deaths occurring in Kerr County. The flooding was caused by a mesoscale convective vortex with enhanced tropical moisture.

Flooding began on the morning of July 4, after significant rainfall accumulated across Central Texas. Six flash flood emergencies, which included the cities of Kerrville and Mason, were issued the same day. The Guadalupe River rose about 26 ft (8 m) in 45 minutes, surging an estimated 29 ft (8.8 m) in the Hunt area, where more than 20 children were declared missing from a summer camp. July 5 saw more flash flood warnings for Burnet, Williamson, and Travis counties, including Lake Travis, which is part of the Colorado River watershed, and the lower San Gabriel River (Texas). The worst affected area in NW Travis County was the Sandy Creek neighborhood, which saw devastating damage in the wake of the floods. A total of 9 people died in Travis County, 3 in Williamson County, and 5 in Burnet County. In the span of a few hours, the equivalent of four months worth of rain fell across the Texas Hill Country region, with the highest rain totals being 20.33 in (516 mm). The flood was the deadliest inland flooding event in the United States since the 1976 Big Thompson River flood, surpassing flooding from Hurricane Helene in 2024.

On July 12, the Weather Prediction Center declared a moderate risk for the same area in Central Texas, with the potential for significant to major flash flooding. Throughout the overnight hours of July 12 into the next day, several flash flood warnings were issued, including a flash flood emergency for San Saba County. The resulting additional rainfall caused the Lampasas River to rise over 30 ft (9.1 m).

After the disaster, Texas governor Greg Abbott signed a disaster declaration for several counties in Central Texas, and U.S. president Donald Trump signed a federal disaster declaration for Kerr County. Over 2,000 volunteers arrived in Kerr County to help with the search and rescue. Numerous firefighter and search and rescue teams from around the U.S. scoured the Guadalupe River for survivors and victims. Various organizations responded to the area with food, equipment and manpower.

Kerr County did not have a dedicated flood warning system, despite prior proposals from local officials citing the area's high flood risk. For National Flood Insurance Program purposes administered by the Federal Emergency Management Agency (FEMA), the floodplain or special flood hazard area is defined as the area that would be flooded by a base flood which "has a one percent chance of being equaled or exceeded in any given year", also known as a 100-year flood. The 2011 Kerr County flood insurance rate map showed Camp Mystic, a Christian girls' summer camp, as being in a special flood hazard area. Following various appeals from the camp, several buildings were removed from the hazard area, as the camp continued to operate and expanded in and around the flood plain.

=== July 2025 Southern New Mexico floods ===
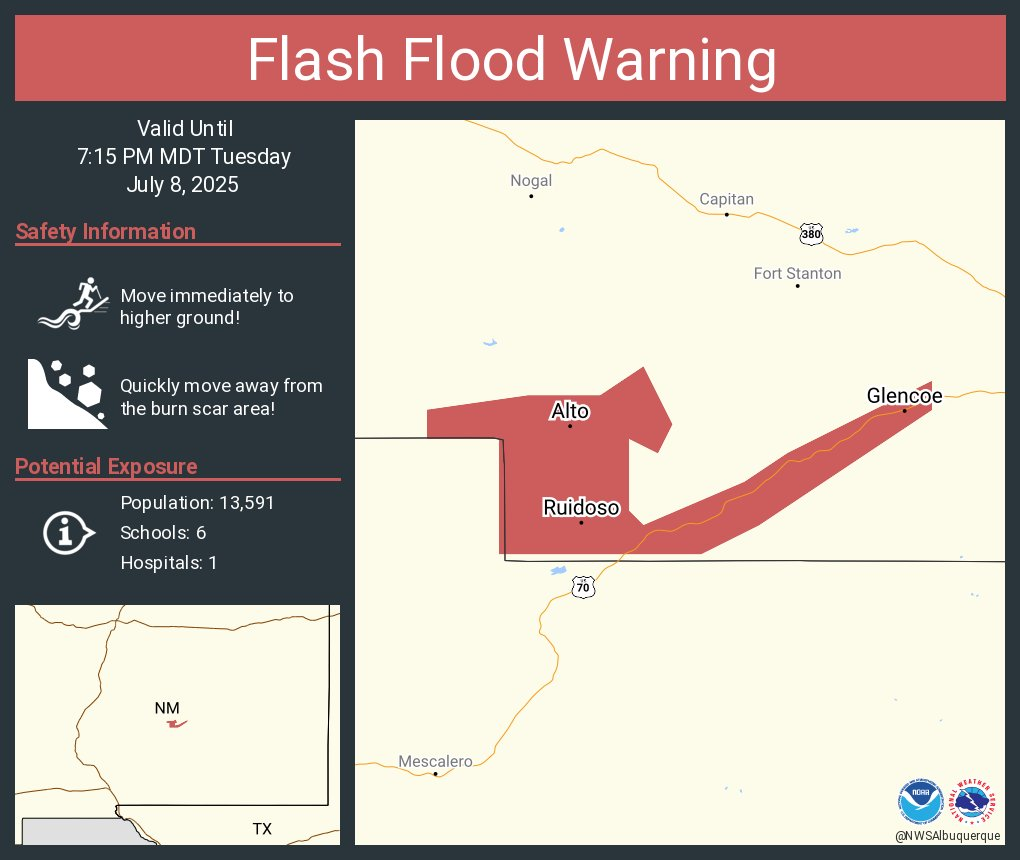
A flash flood warning issued for Ruidoso

On July 8, 2025, heavy rains caused flash flooding along the Rio Ruidoso, in the Ruidoso, New Mexico, area. The river rapidly rose to a record 20 ft (6 m). Wildfire burn scarring from 2024 exacerbated the impact. Emergency crews carried out over 85 swift water rescues, including people trapped inside their homes and cars. Several people were treated for injuries. Multiple bridges and roads were submerged underwater, and several houses were washed away during the floods, causing hundreds to be displaced. Two children were swept away during the flooding, and drowned. A third person, a man in his 40s or 50s, also drowned. In a press conference on July 9, officials said that four people remained missing. Storm damage was estimated at $50 million.

=== Mid-July 2025 Northeast floods ===
Flash flooding resulted in New York City having their second wettest hour on record, with 2.07 in (53 mm) of rain falling down, behind just Hurricane Ida in 2021. Additionally, two people are killed due to flooding in Plainfield, New Jersey. Several subway lines in Manhattan were suspended during the height of the flooding. Additionally, a flash flood emergency was issued in southeastern Virginia during the storm. Governor Phil Murphy declared a state of emergency for New Jersey after the storms. Over 100 flash flood warnings were issued on July 14, the most ever for a day in July.

=== July 2025 Gulf Coast floods ===
The Gulf Coast of the United States saw heavy rainfall and flooding across parts of Florida and Louisiana from tropical weather system that formed off the formed off the Atlantic coast of the southeastern United States in Mid-July, 2025. The National Hurricane Center (NHC) designated the system Invest 93L on July 14, and a flood watch was issued for South Florida. The next day, the disturbance began showing some signs of a developing circulation, prior to moving onshore over Northeast Florida, then across Central Florida.

Over 10 in (250 mm) of rain fell in Plant City on July 14, and Mims reported 8.41 in (214 mm) of rain on July 15. Flooding in Mims prompted the relocation of inhabitants of an apartment complex in the community. Additionally, Daytona Beach recorded 2.25 in (57 mm) of rain on July 14, setting a new daily record, beating out one set in 1935. Over 10,000 customers lost electricity in the Tampa Bay area on July 14, due to downed power lines. Partially due to weather, delays and cancellations were reported at airports in Florida. On July 14, Miami International Airport reported 181 delays and 47 cancellations, Fort Lauderdale–Hollywood International Airport reported 89 delays and 29 cancellations, and Orlando International Airport reported over 250 delays.

Heavy rain also occurred in Louisiana a few days later, starting on July 17. Flood watches there ran from July 16 to July 19. Sandbags were distributed in several counties including Terrebonne, St. Tammany, and New Orleans Parishes. New Orleans closed city buildings, and canals there were drained to accommodate the anticipated rainfall from the system. The New Orleans area experienced flooding on July 17. By July 18, Baton Rouge reported 3.09 inches (78 mm) of rain, an area south of Lafayette reported 4.35 inches (110 mm), and Houma reported 4.67 inches (119 mm).

=== Typhoon Halong (2025) ===
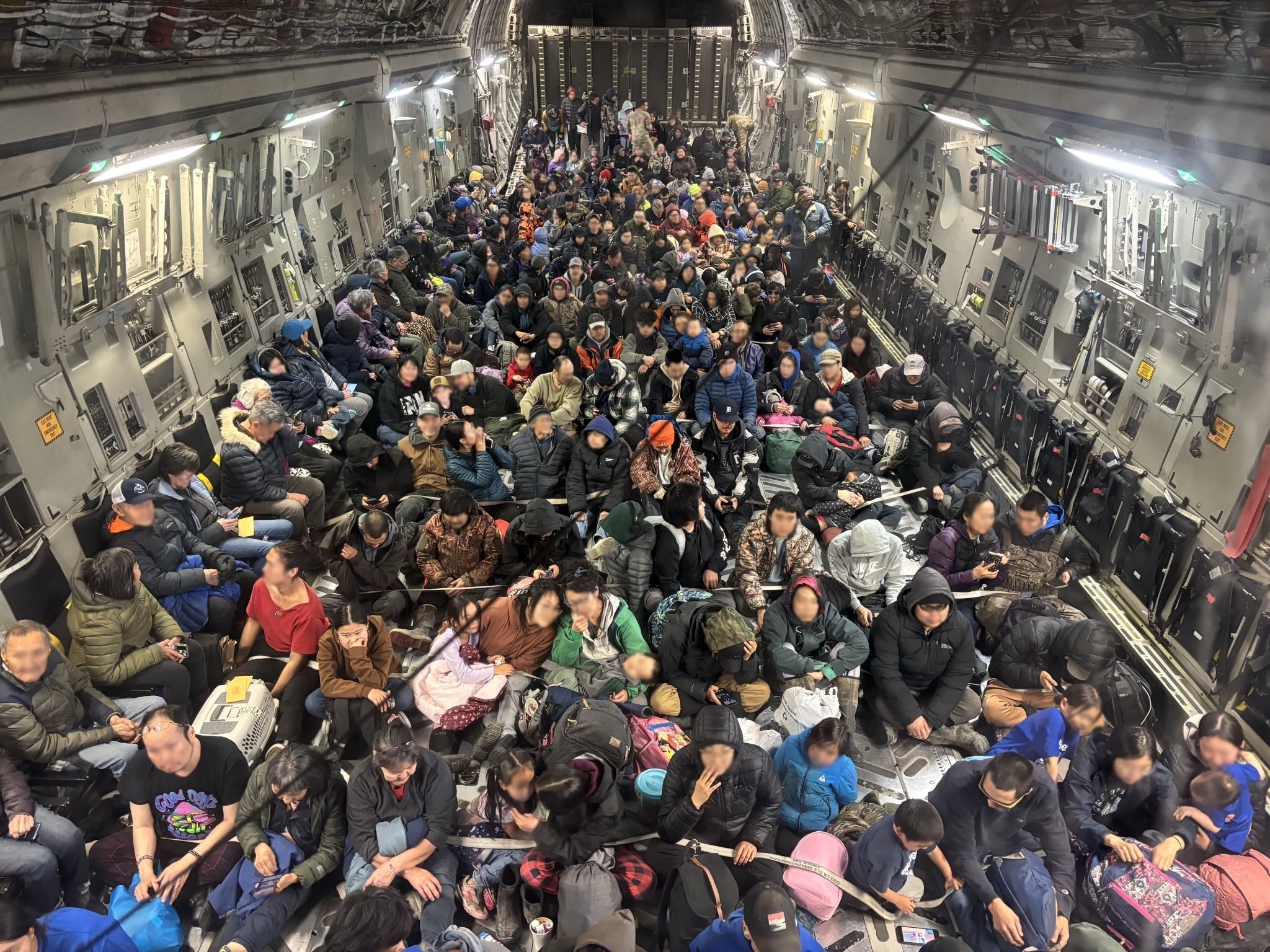
Residents being evacuated from Bethel by the Alaska Air National Guard

In Western Alaska, flood and high wind watches were issued ahead of the storm's expected intensification as an extratropical storm in the North Pacific and Bering Sea, where winds up to hurricane force were expected. These were later upgraded to warnings, with comparisons made to Ex-Typhoon Merbok in 2022, which caused severe flooding in some coastal communities in September of that year.

The remnants of Halong brought significant impacts to Alaska, with the worst of the impact in the Yukon–Kuskokwim Delta. Wind speeds of 98 knots (181 km/h; 113 mph) were measured in the Kusilvak Mountains. The storm caused record flooding in Kipnuk and Kwigillingok where several people went missing after numerous houses were floated off their foundations. The Coast Guard rescued approximately 20 persons from their homes after the buildings had floated out to sea. A roof detached from a home and a school boardwalk was damaged in Kongiganak. Near Quinhagak, the Nunalleq archaeological digsite was destroyed by the flooding, and artifacts from the permafrost was dispersed.

Water levels in Kipnuk reached record heights of 6.6 feet (2.0 m) above mean high water. Boardwalks and roads were submerged across the Yukon-Kuskokwim region, while debris blocked the runway at Bethel Airport and a barge in Bethel broke from its mooring and struck a bridge. Elsewhere in Western Alaska, strong winds occurred, resulting in roof and siding damage, airborne debris, and extensive tree damage. Several power outages occurred, including to the KSKO radio station in McGrath which was knocked off the air.

In response to impacts from the storm, parts of western Alaska were placed under a disaster declaration by Governor Mike Dunleavy. On October 13 after the storm, Alaska State Troopers confirmed there was one fatality in Kwigillingok, with two others missing; they confirmed that all were accounted for from Kipnuk. They also said a search helicopter from Fairbanks was sent to the area to deliver generators and fuel, with additional search and rescue efforts conducted jointly by the U.S. Coast Guard, Alaska Army National Guard, and Alaska Air National Guard. One of the missing persons from Kwigillingok was found in June, 8 months after the storm. As of June 2026, one person remains missing.

In Alaska, the storm resulted in one woman dead along with thousands displaced. Governor Dunleavy, in his request for a federal disaster declaration on October 16, said that many residents "will not be able to return to their communities for more than 18 months". The Red Cross asked for the OpenStreetMap to help map the villages that were damaged by the storm as they begin operating in the area. A FEMA assessment estimated the storm to have caused $125 million dollars in damages.

=== Late October 2025 Northeast floods ===
A mid-latitude low over the Eastern United States pulled some moisture into the New York City metropolitan area on October 30. In New York City, two persons were reported drowned from basement flooding. Central Park recorded 1.83 in (46.48 mm) of rain which set a new daily rainfall record. Between New York and neighboring New Jersey, over 15,000 customers lost power. Record rainfall was also reported in Allentown, Pennsylvania and Baltimore, Maryland on October 30. The heavy rain and strong winds also impacted Connecticut, resulting in fallen trees and flooding, which forced the closing of several roads.

=== 2025 Pacific Northwest floods ===
Beginning on December 8, 2025, a series of severe floods impacted rivers and lowlands in the Pacific Northwest, particularly Western Washington in the United States and the Fraser Valley in British Columbia, Canada. The floods were triggered by an atmospheric river that was among the strongest and longest-lasting in the history of the Puget Sound region. Up to 10 inches (25 cm) of rain fell in the Cascade Range due to the storm system and a total of 5 trillion gallons (19 trillion litres) within a week-long period.

A state of emergency was declared by Washington governor Bob Ferguson on December 10 along with an order to deploy the Washington National Guard and the Washington State Guard to prepare for disaster response. An estimated 100,000 people in Washington are within areas with evacuation orders due to the expected impact of the floods. A local state of emergency was declared in several areas of British Columbia near the Fraser River.

=== 2026 Hawaii floods ===
Throughout a majority of March 2026, Hawaii saw its largest and most destructive floods in over two decades, resulting in at least US$1 billion in damages. Although many people were displaced, nobody died in any reported flood incidents.

=== 2026 Kentucky floods ===
Floods in Kentucky on June 27, 2026, resulted in four fatalities. Three of the fatalities were in Madison County. Additionally, Owensboro, Kentucky set a new 24-hour rainfall record at 6.2 in (160 mm).

=== Mid-July 2026 Eastern United States floods ===
Flash flooding on July 17 resulted in a fatality in Fairfax, Ohio as well as three injuries across the Cincinnati metropolitan area. Further east, flash floods resulted in up to 3 in (76 mm) of rain in the New York City metropolitan area, resulting in a Noah Kahan concert being cancelled, the New York Yankees being forced to postpone their game, and several flooded highways. Additionally, Newark Liberty International Airport, John F. Kennedy International Airport, and LaGuardia Airport were all under ground stops.

=== Late July 2026 East Coast flash floods ===
Flash flooding on July 28-29 resulted in Albany having their wettest two day period on record, with July 29 becoming the second wettest day on record, behind only Hurricane Floyd. Rainfall reached up to 11.8 in (300 mm) in Shodack. Flooding resulted in a boil water advisory in Castleton-on-Hudson. On July 28, flooding resulted in a fatality in New Jersey. Damage from the storm resulted in all Amtrak service being suspended from New York City to Albany.

=== August 2026 Indiana floods ===
Beginning on August 11, 2026, the state of Indiana was impacted by several rounds of thunderstorms and heavy rainfall, resulting in widespread and historic flooding across the central and southern portions of the state, as well as in adjacent areas of Ohio and Kentucky. The flooding has left at least 7 dead in Indiana and prompted a statewide disaster proclamation from Indiana Governor Mike Braun.

=== August 2026 Grand Canyon floods ===
On August 29, 2026, compound climate extremes and heavy rainfall caused a major flash flood that surged through Bright Angel Creek at Grand Canyon National Park in Arizona, United States. It is the national park's biggest flood since 1966.

The flood resulted in the deaths of three hikers, while 82 were rescued and evacuated. Floodwaters caused widespread destruction to park infrastructure, landscape, and the Transcanyon Waterline, triggering Stage 4 water restrictions across the South Rim.

== See also ==
- Floods in the United States before 1900
- Floods in the United States (1900–1999)
- United States tropical cyclone rainfall climatology
