= Precipitable water =

Precipitable water is the depth of water in a column of the atmosphere, if all the water in that column were precipitated as rain. As a depth, the precipitable water is measured in millimeters or inches. The term is often abbreviated as "TPW", for Total Precipitable Water.

== Measurement ==
There are different measurement techniques:

- One type of measurement is based on the measurement of the solar irradiance on two wavelengths, one in a water absorption band, and the other not. The precipitable water column is determined using the irradiances in these bands and the Beer–Lambert law.
- The precipitable water can also be calculated by integration of radiosonde data (relative humidity, pressure and temperature) over the whole atmosphere.
- Data can be viewed on a Lifted-K index. The numbers represent inches of water as mentioned above for a geographical location.
- Recently, methods using the Global Positioning System have been developed.
- Some work has been performed to create empirical relationships between surface specific humidity and precipitable water based on localized measurements (generally a 2nd to 5th order polynomial). However, this method has not received widespread use in part because humidity is a local measurement and precipitable water is a total column measurement.
