= Missouri River 340 =

Kayak and canoe race in Missouri, U.S.

The Missouri River 340, or also known as MR340, is a 340-mile kayak and canoe race that stretches from Kansas City, Kansas to St. Charles, Missouri, that follows the Missouri River. It is the longest continuous kayak and canoe marathon in North America, alongside the Yukon 1000, and one of the longest, if not the longest in the world.

== Checkpoints ==
Start: Kaw Point, Kansas City, Kansas

- CP1: Lexington, Missouri
- CP2: Waverly, Missouri
- CP3: Glasgow, Missouri
- CP4: Wilson's Serenity Point at Noren Access (Jefferson City)
- CP5: Hermann, Missouri
- CP6: Klondike, Missouri

End: St. Charles, Missouri

== Winners ==
Year	Division	Name(s)	Total Time
2019	Men's Tandem	Steve Landick, Jeremy Vore	35:27
2018	Voyageur (5–9)	Phil Bowden, Dylan McHardy, Brad Daniels, Wendel Smith, Michael Mathews	33:01
2017	Men's Tandem	Joe Mann, Dylan McHardy	37:09
2016	Voyageur (5–9)	Holly Orr, Morgan Kohut, Amy Boyd, Mollie Binion, Brenda Jones	38:22
2015	Men's Tandem	Phil Bowden, Chris Issendorf	34:34
2014	Men's Tandem	Dave Anderson, Will Anderson	37:19
2013	Voyageur (5–9)	Clay Wyatt, Andrew Condie, Logan Mynar, Amando Cruz, Wade Binion, William Russell	35:58
2012	Voyageur (5–9)	Andrew Condie, Wade Binion, Michael Vandeveer, Chris Paddack, Jay Daniel, Andres Cabb	39:40
2011	Men's Tandem	Michael Vandeveer & Andrew Condie	38:12
2010	Men's Tandem	West Hansen & David Kelley	36:48
2009	Men's Tandem	David Anderson & Will Anderson	38:59
2008	Team (3–6)	Anderson, Glock, Hansen, Kelley, Rendon, Steppe	36:19
2007	Men's Tandem	West Hansen & Michael Steppe	44:27
2006	Men's Solo	West Hansen	53:40

== Records ==
=== Dragon Boat (10+) ===
Division Rank	Names	Year	Total Time
1	Christina Glauner, Lisa Grossman, Eric Farris, Jonathan Redfern, Joseph Ringling, Dave Hudson, Doug Jennings, Scott Swafford, Ken Tilford, Will Murphy, Jeff Barrow, Ryan Mason, Rick Wise, Sean Butler, Mark Handley, Krista Patterson, Kelly Sumner, Barry Brown, Joseph Heger, & Michael Maples	2010	38:05
2	Will Murphy, Ken Tilford, Ron Ladzinski, Mira Doneva, Stan Orsolek, Wayne Albert, Doug Jennings, Beverly Sorrells, Matt Stephenson, Michael Maples, & Charles Wolfe	2013	53:09
3	David Treece, Ken Mortimer, Phil Schneider, Ron Schneider, Jamie Walker, Rich Talkington, Pete Matschiner, David Patrick, Staci Olsen, Keith Florez, Kenneth Stecher, Nathan Clark, & Derek Linam	2013	59:12
4	Alex Kuntzman, Lynn Decapo, Emily Woll, Simon Hile, Teri Rudelic, Angela Carter, Eric Evans, Perry Whitaker, Ryan Roe, Myles Arbeeny, Joe Smith, & Konner Cool	2017	64:17

=== Men's Solo ===
Division Rank	Name	Year	Total Time
1	Ryan Slebos	2015	36:43
2	Carter Johnson	2008	37:46
3	Joe Mann	2015	37:56
4	Santo Albright	2010	38:44
5	Andrew Condie	2014	39:16
6	Eric Sutter	2015	39:32
7	J. Glenn Phaup	2015	39:32
8	Joe Mann	2016	40:48
9	Wayne Anderson	2015	41:06
10	Gerry Mitchell	2015	41:14

=== Men's Tandem ===
Division Rank	Names	Year	Total Time
1	Phil Bowden & Chris Issendorf	2015	34:34
2	Steve Landick & Jeremy Vore	2019	35:27
3	West Hansen & David Kelly	2010	36:48
4	Wally Werderich & Nick Josefik	2010	37:02
5	Joe Mann & Dylan McHardy	2017	37:09
6	Dave Anderson & Will Anderson	2014	37:19
7	Michael Vandeever & Andrew Condie	2011	38:12
8	Kevin Schwartz & Matt Green	2010	38:48
9	Phil Reed & Mitch Anderson	2010	38:49
10	Dave Anderson & Will Anderson	2009	38:59

=== Mixed Tandem ===
Division Rank	Names	Year	Total Time
1	Morgan Kohut & Brian Jones	2017	38:35
2	Vicki Cummings & Del Cummings	2015	40:17
3	Jeff Wueste & Amy Boyd	2014	40:38
4	Chuck McHenry & Di McHenry	2010	41:26
5	Dodd Yeager & Virginia Parker	2013	44:19
6	Katie Pfefferkorn & West Hansen	2009	44:32
7	Allen McAdams & Melanie Hof	2012	45:05
8	Mark Scott & Brigitte Scott	2015	45:20
9	Ransom White & Terry White	2015	47:01
10	Chuck McHenry & Di McHenry	2009	47:26

=== Mixed Team Division (3-4 paddlers, at least 50% female) ===
Division Rank	Names	Year	Total Time
1	Jason Doverspike, Karla Ramsay, Steve Ramsay, Brooke Ramsay	2015	45:19
2	Dan Grubbs, Christina Glauner, Di McHenry, Zahaim Abdullah	2008	51:24
3	Jonathan Redfern, Lauren Redfern, Katilin Jiral	2012	54:28
4	Randy Poppa, Megan Poppa, Sarah Poppa	2014	63:24
5	Jan Cook, Dave Haessig, Joan Twillman	2016	66:30
6	Christine Jackson, Kris Abens, Anne Bevis (All female boat)	2013	67:46
7	Stephen Jackson, Christine Jackson, Ellen Jackson, Claire Jackson	2012	77:10

=== Stand Up Paddleboard (SUP) ===
Division Rank	Name	Year	Total Time
1	Bart De Zwart	2016	50:16
2	Mitch Anderson	2016	51:12
3	Mitch Anderson	2017	51:22
4	Phil Rodway	2017	55:37
5	Scott Baste	2017	59:27
6	Joanne Hamilton-Vale	2016	60:26
7	Lauren Rodriquez	2017	61:23
8	Blake Thornton	2015	61:28
9	Blake Thornton	2017	63:16
10	Blake Thornton	2016	63:48

=== Tandem Pedal Drive ===
Division Rank	Names	Year	Total Time
1	Greg Kolodziejzyk & Helen Kolodziejzyk	2015	41:38
2	Scott Reeves & Tim Davis	2016	45:51
3	Steve Klein & Sam Moore	2015	47:22
4	Steve Klein & Sam Moore	2017	48:47
5	Matt Burris & Tiffany Burris	2016	49:59
6	Mike Ketchmark & Mark Andresen	2014	52:22
7	Joe Blount & Keith Conant	2012	65:40
8	Perry Whitaker & Mike Leahy	2011	68:43
9	Patrick Crowe & Scott Young	2016	75:45
10	Scott Croom & David Crane	2012	76:54

=== Team (3-4) ===
Division Rank	Names	Year	Total Time
1	Joe Mann, Ryan Slebos, & Matt Dresslaer	2012	40:46
2	David Ganey, Nathan Redcay, & Tod Wilson	2015	41:10
3	Mitch Anderson, Phil Reed, & Cole Clement	2015	42:02
4	Matt Green, Brian Brooks, & David Lackey	2013	43:52
5	Phil Reed, Mitch Anderson, & Cole Clement	2014	44:52
6	Chris Colhour, Brad Colhour, & Daniel Colhour	2015	45:28
7	Diane Diebold, Daryl Simon, & Mike Dey	2017	45:42
8	Larry Scroggins, Yancy Scroggins, & Krista Sue Scroggins	2014	46:10
9	Larry Scroggins, Yancy Scroggins, & Krista Sue Scroggins	2012	47:16
10	Diane Diebold, Daryl Simon, & Mike Dey	2016	49:13

=== Team (3-6) ===
Division Rank	Names	Year	Total Time
1	Phil Bowden, Wendel Smith, Brad Daniels, Michael Mathews, Dylan McHardy	2018	33:01
2	Phil Bowden, Chris Issendorf	2015	34:34
3	West Hansen, Richard Steppe, David Anderson, David Kelly, Jeff Glock, & Mike Rendon	2008	36:19
4	Mitch Anderson, Phil Reed, Matt Green, Kevin Schwartz, Larry Scroggins, & Yancy Scroggins	2011	39:24
5	John Bugge, Efrain Cruz, Daniel Cruz, Johnathan Madrill, & Jerry Rhaburn	2008	39:50
6	Jeff Moore, Kevin Moore, & David Moore	2010	45:53
7	Matt Green, Kevin Schwartz, Tod Wilson, & Jim Cowley	2009	46:42
8	Jeff Jager, Dan Deuterman, & Matt Laughlin	2010	56:29
9	Ralph Hernandez, Bill Jones, & Rudy Bears	2010	59:11
10	Tom Ronk, Sid Soffels, John Meyer, Arlen Beck, Dick Brumley, & Tom Young	2009	60:11
11	Mike Gordon, Matt Gordon, & Joe Geisnger	2009	60:58

=== Team Pedal Drive ===
Division Rank	Names	Year	Total Time
1	Scott Reeves, Robert Smith, & Dwayne VanHoose	2014	47:46

=== Voyageur (5-9) ===
Division Rank	Names	Year	Total Time
1	Phil Bowden, Brad Daniels, Wendel Smith, Dylan McHardy, Michael Mathews	2018	33:01
1	Wade Binion, Andrew Condie, Amando Cruz, William Russell, Logan Mynar, & Clay Wyatt	2013	35:58
2	Virginia Condie, Holly Orr, Morgan Kohut, Amy Boyd, Mollie Binion, & Brenda Jones	2016	38:22
3	Andrew Condie, Wade Binion, Chris Paddack, Michael Vandeveer, Jay Daniel, & Andres Cabb	2012	39:40
4	Abigail Tuttle, Linda LaFontaine, Yolandea Wood, Joan Twillman, Mandy Urban, Carol Heddinghaus, Jeannette Anthony, Renee Simmons, & Kim Jones	2015	47:26
5	Mike Gordon, Joe Geisinger, John Erskine, Sheila Reiter, & Jim Weber	2012	49:08
6	Kelly Sumner, Stanley Orsolek, Eric Farris, Doug Jennings, Adam Burns, Dave Hudson, & Will Murphy	2012	50:25
7	Mike Dey, Michael Cade, Mike Gordon, Richard Linden, & Chris Champion	2014	51
8	Mike Dey, Mike Gordon, Geoff Waters, Ken Starz, & John Valdivia	2013	53:31
9	Carol Heddinghaus, Cami Ronchetto, Linda LaFontaine, Yolandea Wood, Joan Twillman, Janet Meredith, Kati Albers, & Jayme Gribble	2014	55:06
10	Tim Steinbrenner, Staci Olsen, Craig O'Conner, Brandon Butcher, Ronnie Schnider, David Patrick, Tim Ganz, Bob Ogle, & Thomas Simmons	2014	55:21

=== Women's Solo ===
Division Rank	Name	Year	Total Time
1	Salli O'Donnell	2021	42:29
2	Robyn Benincasa	2016	43:50
3	Salli O'Donnell	2017	44:06
4	Robyn Benincasa	2014	44:51
5	Katie Pfefferkorn	2010	46:42
6	Robyn Benincasa	2012	47:22
7	Sheila Reiter	2015	47:53
8	Krista Sue Scroggins	2016	49:55
9	Katie Pfefferkorn	2008	50:00
10	Kristi Albright	2010	50:40

=== Women's Tandem ===
Division Rank	Names	Year	Total Time
1	Mollie Binion & Amy Boyd	2015	38:43
2	Di McHenry & Katie Pfefferkorn	2011	44:36
3	Di McHenry & JoJo Newbold	2015	46:34
4	Loreen Mattson & Teresa Dewitt	2010	49:17
5	Carol Heddinghaus & Abigail Tuttle	2010	49:24
6	Di McHenry & Mandy Urban	2016	51:23
7	Carol Heddinghaus & Abigail Tuttle	2016	53:36
8	Jody Carroll & Jane Monroe	2017	57:53
9	Carol Heddinghaus & Abigail Tuttle	2011	58:43
10	Carol Heddinghaus & Abigail Tuttle	2013	59:27

=== Most Solo Finishes ===
- (5) Marek Uliasz (2006, 2007, 2008, 2009, 2010)

=== Most Finishes ===
- (5) Katie Pfefferkorn (2006, 2007, 2008, 2009, 2010)
- (5) Di McHenry (2006, 2007, 2008, 2009, 2010)
- (5) Marek Uliasz (2006, 2007, 2008, 2009, 2010)
- (5) West Hansen (2006, 2007, 2008, 2009, 2010)
- (5) Chuck McHenry (2006, 2007, 2008, 2009, 2010)
