= National Weather Service Memphis, Tennessee =

National Weather Service - Memphis, TN is a local weather forecast office responsible for monitoring weather conditions in the U.S. Mid-South region for counties in Eastern Arkansas, the Missouri Bootheel (Dunklin and Pemiscot counties), Northern Mississippi, and Western Tennessee. The current office in Memphis maintains a WSR-88D (NEXRAD) radar system, and Advanced Weather Interactive Processing System (AWIPS) that greatly improve forecasting in the region. Memphis is in charge of weather forecasts, warnings and local statements as well as aviation weather. The name of the Doppler weather radar (WSR-88D) used by this office is MEG. Darone Jones is the Meteorologist-In-Charge (MIC) of this office.
