= 2007 Colombian regional and municipal elections =

Colombian elections

← 2003	October 28, 2007	2011 →

The 2007 Colombian regional and municipal elections were held in the Republic of Colombia on October 28, 2007. The elections were organized as established by the Colombian Constitution of 1991 by the National Electoral Council (Consejo Nacional Electoral, CNE) to elect Department governors with its respective Department Assemblies, Mayors with their respective City Councils and the Local Administrative Juntas (JAL).

The election preparations and electoral campaigns occurred amid significant debate over the absence of guarantees for voters. Concerns were raised about potential interference from illegal armed groups, such as paramilitary self-defense groups or guerrilla factions, not only in terms of possible sabotage of the elections but also their support for certain candidates. This follows historical instances where politicians were elected with backing from the United Self-Defense Forces of Colombia, a phenomenon highlighted in the parapolitics scandal. Additionally, there were apprehensions about the infiltration of drug trafficking money into the campaigns, a recurrence of past issues where drug money sometimes collaborated with illegal armed actions. Electoral fraud was also a concern, commonly manifested through practices such as vote buying and vote shifting.

The Attorney General of the Nation, Edgardo Maya Villazón, expressed reservations about conducting the elections under the existing electoral system, which has remained unchanged since before the 1991 Constitution and is susceptible to such frauds. Despite these issues, the elections proceeded.

The elections have been marked by the assassination of 22 candidates and the kidnapping of at least two. The main armed group targeting the elections is the marxist leninist guerrilla Revolutionary Armed Forces of Colombia (FARC), as part of the Colombian armed conflict with the government of Colombia. The President of Colombia Álvaro Uribe Vélez publicly called not to vote for those candidates preferred by the FARC or candidates who were offering to buy people's vote. While in some areas there are reports of untrusting the elections due to the break out of the Parapolitica scandal in 2006 in which it was discovered that members of the demobilized paramilitary group United Self-Defense Forces of Colombia (AUC) had been colluding with political leaders and members of the public force in order thwart adversaries and advance politically.

On this date, some 27 million Colombians are apt to vote to elect between some 86 thousand candidates to represent 1,098 Colombian municipalities and 32 governors of Colombian Departments. Colombian authorities mobilized 167,559 soldiers and policemen in order to vigil the 9,950 voting sites.

== Candidates ==
=== Governorships ===
Departamento	Candidato	Partido	Votos	%
Amazonas	Félix Francisco Acosta Soto	Partido Convergencia Ciudadana	9.426	46.81%
Amazonas	Olbar Andrade Rincón	Partido Cambio Radical	6.895	34,24%
Amazonas	Eliseo Rosendo Martínez Cruz	Partido Colombia Democrática	1.076	5,34%
Antioquia	Luis Alfredo Ramos Botero	Partido Alas Equipo Colombia	836.526	44.45%
Antioquia	Eugenio Prieto Soto	Una Antioquia Nueva	579.020	30,77%
Antioquia	Rodrigo de Jesus Saldarriaga Sanin	Polo Democrático Alternativo	58,992	3,13%
Arauca	Freddy Forero Requiniva	Partido Cambio Radical	27.889	38.94%
Arauca	Adalberto Enrique Jaimes Ochoa	Partido Liberal Colombiano	15,522	21,67%
Arauca	Albeiro Vanegas Osorio	Partido de Unidad Nacional	12.723	17,77%
Atlántico	Eduardo Ignacio Verano De la Rosa	Partido Liberal Colombiano	344.112	46.41%
Atlántico	José Antonio Name Terán	Partido de Unidad Nacional	213.270	28,76%
Bolívar	Joaco Hernando Berrío Villarreal	Partido Cambio Radical	206.962	32.76%
Bolívar	Alfonso López Cossio	Partido de Unidad Nacional	177.703	28,13%
Bolívar	Dionisio Miranda Tejedor	Polo Democrático Alternativo	47.335	7.49%
Boyacá	José Rozo Millán	Verde Opción Centro	195.537	35.28%
Boyacá	Pedro Alonso Sanabria Buitrago	Partido Conservador Colombiano	191.041	34,46%
Boyacá	Rafael Romero Piñeros	Partido Liberal Colombiano	56.787	10.24%
Caldas	Mario Aristizábal Muñoz	Partido Liberal Colombiano	157.714	38.76%
Caldas	Francisco José Cruz Prada	Partido de Unidad Nacional	145.100	35,66%
Caldas	Ricardo Alberto Castaño Zapata	Polo Democrático Alternativo	14.839	3,65%
Caquetá	Luis Francisco Cuéllar Carvajal	Alianza Social Indígena	35.780	32,72%
Caquetá	Álvaro Pacheco Álvarez	Partido Liberal Colombiano	27.104	24,79%
Caquetá	Nelcy Almario Rojas	Movimiento Nacional Afrocolombiano	18.622	17.03%
Casanare	Óscar Raúl Iván Flórez Chávez	Partido de Unidad Nacional	78.774	59,78%
Casanare	Efrén Antonio Hernández Díaz	Partido Liberal Colombiano	40.776	30,94%
Casanare	Yimmy Novoa Ángel	Partido Alas Equipo Colombia	2.253	1.71%
Cauca	Guillermo Alberto González Mosquera	Movimiento Nacional Afrocolombiano	134,866	32.58%
Cauca	Eduardo José González Angulo	Partido Liberal Colombiano	87,950	21.24%
Cauca	Juan Diego Castrillón Orrego	Movimiento Alianza Social Indígena	39,832	9.62%
Cesar	Cristian Hernando Moreno Panezo	Verde Opción Centro	141,211	43.38%
Cesar	Arturo Rafael Calderon Rivadeneira	Movimiento Independiente Libres	94,277	28.96%
Cesar	Jaime Camilo Murgas Arzuaga	Partido Conservador Colombiano	47,847	14.70%
Chocó	Patrocinio Sánchez Montes de Oca	Partido de Unidad Nacional	45,338	38.68%
Chocó	Carlos Alberto Escobar Córdoba	Partido Liberal Colombiano	36,431	31.08%
Chocó	Yesid Francisco Perea Mosquera	Partido Conservador Colombiano	2,639	2.25%
Córdoba	Marta del Socorro Sáenz Correa	Partido Liberal Colombiano	234,639	39.16%
Córdoba	Margarita Rosa Andrade García	Partido Colombia Democrática	203,339	33.93%
Córdoba	Álvaro Emiro Petro Sierra	Polo Democrático Alternativo	12,125	2.02%
Cundinamarca	Andrés González Díaz	Partido Liberal Colombiano	457,023	51.38%
Cundinamarca	Álvaro Cruz Vargas	Partido Cambio Radical	217,582	24.46%
Cundinamarca	Tarsicio Mora Godoy	Polo Democrático Alternativo	32,383	3.64%
Guainía	Iván Vargas Silva	Partido de Unidad Nacional	3,057	28.99%
Guainía	Jose Walter Lenis Porras	Partido Alas Equipo Colombia	2,542	24.11%
Guainía	Jorge villegas Caro	Alianza Social Indígena	1,501	14.24%
Guainía	Gustavo González	Partido Conservador Colombiano	1,424	13.51%
Guainía	Luis Eduardo Manotas Solano	Partido Cambio Radical	1,011	9.59%
Guaviare	Oscar de Jesús López Cadavid	Partido Conservador Colombiano	9,418	37.65%
Guaviare	Dagoberto Suárez Melo	Movimiento Convergencia Ciudadana	8,717	34.94%
Guaviare	Luis Fernando Angarita González	Movimiento Colombia Viva	4,350	17.39%
Huila	Luis Jorge Pajarito Sánchez García	Partido Conservador Colombiano	187,792	49.04%
Huila	Carlos Mauricio Iriarte Barrios	Partido Liberal Colombiano	128,859	33.65%
Huila	José Jairo González Arias	Polo Democrático Alternativo	9,265	2.42%
La Guajira	Jorge Eduardo Pérez Bernier	Movimiento El Pueblo Decide	89,064	44.36%
La Guajira	Miguel Antonio Murgas Núñez	Partido Liberal Colombiano	83,869	41.77%
La Guajira	Jaime Enrique De Luquez Díaz	Polo Democrático Alternativo	6,857	3.42%
Magdalena	Omar Ricardo Díaz Granados Velásquez	Partido de Unidad Nacional	143,593	36.35%
Magdalena	José Luis Pinedo Campo	Partido Cambio Radical	122,237	30.94%
Magdalena	Vilbrun Edward Tovar Peña	Polo Democrático Alternativo	14,004	3.55%
Magdalena	Álvaro Antonio Ordóñez Vives	Movimiento Apertura Liberal	8,093	2.05%
Meta	Darío Vásquez Sánchez	Partido de Unidad Nacional	121,300	43.71%
Meta	Maritza Martínez Aristizábal	Movimiento Volvamos a Avanzar	112,597	40.58%
Meta	Eudoro Álvarez Cohecha	Polo Democrático Alternativo	9,437	3.40%
Nariño	Antonio José Navarro Wolff	Polo Democrático Alternativo	262,917	49.39%
Nariño	Vicente Germán Chamorro de La Rosa	Partido de Unidad Nacional	172,190	32.34%
Norte de Santander	William Villamizar Laguado	Partido Conservador Colombiano	300,451	63.83%
Norte de Santander	Luz Adriana Quiroga Wilches	Movimiento Apertura Liberal	33,784	7.18%
Putumayo	Felipe Alfonso Guzmán Mendoza	Partido Liberal Colombiano	43,322	47.99%
Putumayo	Jimmy Harold Díaz Burbano	Partido Conservador Colombiano	27,684	30.67%
Putumayo	Miguel Ángel Rubio Bravo	Polo Democrático Alternativo	9,700	10.75%
Quindío	Julio Cesar López Espinosa	Por un Quindío Para Todos	93,632	41.01%
Quindío	Gildardo Ceballos Zuluaga	Partido de Unidad Nacional	82,861	36.29%
Quindío	Henry González Mesa	Polo Democrático Alternativo	8,481	3.71%
Risaralda	Víctor Manuel Tamayo Vargas	Partido Conservador Colombiano	151,700	42.91%
Risaralda	Germán Chica Giraldo	Partido Liberal Colombiano	120,991	34.23%
Risaralda	Gonzalo Arango Jiménez	Polo Democrático Alternativo	11,303	3.20%
San Andrés	Pedro Clavel Gallardo Forbes	Movimiento Integración Regional	8,187	37.23%
San Andrés	Aury Socorro Guerrero Bowie	Partido Liberal Colombiano	8,160	37.11%
San Andrés	Jack Housni Jaller	Partido de Unidad Nacional	4,063	18.48%
Santander	Horacio Serpa Uribe	Partido Liberal Colombiano	482,745	55.93%
Santander	Didier Alberto Tavera Amado	Partido Convergencia Ciudadana	293,972	34.06%
Santander	Juan José Landinez Landinez	Polo Democrático Alternativo	4,838	0.56%
Sucre	Jorge Carlos Barraza Farak	Partido de Unidad Nacional	114,976	32.53%
Sucre	Julio César Guerra Tulena	Partido Liberal Colombiano	114,087	32.28%
Sucre	Lucy del Carmen Urzola Capella	Polo Democrático Alternativo	26,246	7.43%
Tolima	Óscar Barreto Quiroga	Partido Conservador Colombiano	178,679	35.25%
Tolima	Luis Carlos Delgado Peñón	Partido Liberal Colombiano	142,362	28.08%
Tolima	Huillman Calderón Azuero	Polo Democrático Alternativo	18,543	3.66%
Valle del Cauca	Juan Carlos Abadía Campo	Movimiento Por Un Valle Seguro	660,174	47.98%
Valle del Cauca	Francisco Javier Murgueitio Restrepo	Partido Conservador Colombiano	117,498	8.54%
Valle del Cauca	Alejandro De Lima Bohmer	Partido Alas Equipo Colombia	107,484	7.81%
Valle del Cauca	Fabiola Perdomo Estrada	Alianza Social Indígena	79,025	5.74%
Valle del Cauca	Orlando Riascos Ocampo	Polo Democrático Alternativo	63,155	4.59%
Valle del Cauca	María del Socorro Bustamante Ibarra	Partido Liberal Colombiano	45,428	3.30%
Vaupés	Leonidas Soto Muñoz	Cambio Radical	35.57%	
Vaupés	Carlos Ivan Melendez	Movimiento Colombia Viva	31.35%	
Vaupés	Iván Darío Sandoval Perilla	Alianza Social Indígena	25.26%	
Vichada	Blas Arvelio Ortiz Rebolledo	Partido de la Unión por la Gente	33.36%	
Vichada	Juan Carlos Ávila	Partido Liberal Colombiano	33.31%	
Vichada	Hugo Janio López Chaqueo	Alas Equipo Colombia	24.37%	

== Irregularities in election process ==
The Colombian newspaper El Tiempo reported that the National Registrar of the Civil State (Registraduria Nacional del Estado Civil) announced several changes in some voting sites in the Colombian Caribbean region: In Cartagena and Magangué in Bolívar Department, Gonzalez in Cesar Department, Barranquilla and Malambo in Atlántico Department and Santa Marta and El Retén in Magdalena Department after there were reports of irregularities.

The local newspaper El Nuevo Día from Ibagué, Tolima Department reported that opposition groups to Major Bolívar Guzmán blocked access to the town of Valle de San Juan also in Tolima Department, alleging that there had been a manipulation of the election process. The blockage prevented functionaries of the National Registrar from establishing elements needed for voting. Members of the Colombian National Police and the Colombian Army were called to reestablish control in the town.

There were also reports of fraudulent techniques used to obtain more votes, the most common was the Trasteo electoral (lit. 'Vote Carrying') in which for example a municipality gets more votes than its official population able to vote, as it occurred in the municipality of Piojó, in Atlántico Department where there were 6,088 people subscribed as apt to vote, but its actual population apt to vote over 18 years old is 2,988.

Caracol Radio reported that there had been 49 people captured for committing electoral fraud crimes and there had been 26 denunciations reported to the Inspector General of Colombia Edgardo Maya among these the possession of numerous IDs used to illegally vote more than once and the exchange of votes for money or groceries for votes. Inspector General Maya-Villazon also discarded any possibility that elected candidates sanctioned with disciplinary sanctions, penal crimes, impeachment or any other fault on this elections will not be able to take office. He also mentioned that in case any of these candidates took office will be suspended from office.

=== Violence ===
A month before the elections there were already some 70 homicides related to the Colombian regional elections of 2007, including government officials, perpetrated by guerrillas, former and new paramilitary groups or common delinquency. This tendency of using violence to coerce the population escalated when the paramilitary groups influenced the previous 2003 regional, presidential and legislative elections.

Onservers part of the mission sent by the Organization of American States (OAS) formally accused the FARC of being the main cause of the disruptions to the electoral process. Not only from violence but from coercion, but also mentioned that the elections were not in danger but for some people in certain areas. Like during the electoral day the FARC used explosives to destroy electrical towers in the southern Colombian Department of Nariño. This action left without electricity an area covered by some 5 municipalities. The Ombudsman of Colombia accused the emerging paramilitary gangs of also thwarting the election process in some areas. Some of this groups included Aguilas Negras, Los Traquetos, Los Mellizos, ''Los de Barranquilla, Los Paisas, Los 40, Macacos, Cuchillos and la Organización Nueva Generación.

==== Post election ====
On October 29, 2007, a day after the election, protesters of the losing candidate for mayor in the municipality of Ciénaga de Oro, Córdoba Department rioted and burned down the City hall and the local office of the National Registrar of the Civil State, alleging that there had been fraud. The winning candidate Plinio Di Paola won with a difference of 15 vote over the losing candidate. Also in Córdoba Department, in the town of Ayapel the office of the National Registrar was stoned. A state of emergency was sanctioned in several other populations of the Córdoba Department.
