= Edwin Besaile =

Colombian politician and architect (born 1980)

45th Governor of Córdoba
- In office January 1, 2016 – January 18, 2018
- Preceded by: Alejandro Lyons
- Succeeded by: Orlando Benítez

Personal details
- Born: Edwin José Besaile Fayed; June 21, 1980 (age 46) Sahagún, Córdoba, Colombia
- Party: Union Party for the People (2015-present)
- Education: University of the Sinú

Edwin José Besaile Fayad (born June 21, 1980) is a Colombian architect and politician, who was governor of the department of Córdoba for the Union Party for the People. He is a member of the Besaile Fayad clan, with his brothers, former senator Musa Besaile, and the former mayor of the municipality of Sahagún Jhon Moisés Besaile.

In the governorship, he replaced Alejandro Lyons (2012–2015), and both were immersed in numerous multi-million dollar corruption cases during their administrations, especially the Hemophilia Cartel. Lyons in confession before the Attorney General's Office testified that Governor Edwin Besaile gave millions from corruption and to Senator Musa Besaile, who kept half the money they obtained from irregular contracts and royalties from Córdoba. Part of the money was used to finance the campaign for the governorship of Edwin Besaile in 2015.

In 2019, the Córdoba Attorney General dismissed Besaile from his position and barred him from holding public office for the next ten years.

== Early life ==
Edwin is the son of Syrian-Lebanese migrant Musa Abraham Besaile Jalife and Yolanda María Fayad from Cartagena, also of Middle Eastern ancestry. His father settled in Colombia in the early 1950s, working for other Middle Eastern migrants already established in the Sahagun region, and grew his business growing rice until he became the founder of one of the largest rice from the Colombian Caribbean coast, Arrocera Palmira.

From the Besayle-Fayad union were born the children Yamil José, Jhon Moisés alias "Jhonny Besaile" and who was mayor of Sahagún, former senator Musa, Edwin and Yolanda María.

Edwin married Roxana Zuleta Bechara, whose mother is Mara Bechara Castilla -Edwin's mother-in-law-, who is one of the owners of the University of Sinú. His wife is the cousin of the representative to the Chamber Raymundo Méndez Bechara.

According to the newspaper El Espectador in a 2018 report, between the brothers they have some 87 properties in Córdoba, most of them in the vicinity of the municipality of Sahagún. Musa's holdings include two estates; one called Villa Yolanda in honor of his mother, and Villa Mile, in honor of his wife.

His brother Musa married the doctor from Sinceleja Olga Milena Flórez Sierra who was Miss Sucre 1999 in the National Beauty Contest.

== Governor of Córdoba (2016-2019) ==
After a political agreement between his brother Musa Besayle and the Sahagunense politician Bernardo Elías "Los ñoños", Edwin was nominated for the governorship of Córdoba to replace Governor Alejandro Lyons.

=== Hemophilia cartel ===
According to the Attorney General's Office, Besayle Fayad allowed the payment of more than COP$ 1,500 million pesos in favor of the San José de la Sabana S.A.S. Health Provider Institution, for the supply of medicines not included in the POS for more than one hundred people who do not had hemophilia disease. The government control entity found that the governor, through the contract, unjustifiably fattened the earnings of the IPS.

The irregularities of the robbery to the health of Córdoba began in the departmental government of Alejandro Lyons, and continued with Besayle According to the Attorney General's Office, the money that IPS earned was used to pay for electoral political campaigns for the Government of Córdoba, with a criminal alliance between Lyons, Edwin and his brother Musa Besayle.

=== Neurological therapies cartel ===
In February 2018, the Attorney General's Office opened charges against Alejandro Lyons and Edwin Besayle in relation to another scandal affecting the health benefits of Cordobans The control entity found irregularities in neurological therapies for children in the department with neurodevelopmental and neurorehabilitation disorders.

According to the Attorney General's Office, the government of Córdoba, during the tenurias of Lyons and Besayle, between 2014 and 2017, made payments of about COP$ 7 billion pesos for therapies with the Institution Providers of Health (IPS) "Funtierra Foundation Rehabilitation" of Montería, with which the Ministry of Health of the department of Córdoba did not even have signed contracts, nor with the parameters established by law for Colombian state contracting.

In 2016, the Comptroller General of the Republic carried out an audit of the resources of the General System of Participations (SGP) and found that the Ministry of Health of Córdoba did not verify that the treatments for which they were paying were carried out, and many of the treatments they do not have verification supports. El ente de control encontró responsables por el desfalco al gobernador de Córdoba, Edwin Besaile, y al auditor médico de la secretaría de salud, Juan David Náder, mientras que se vinculó a los hallazgos a los representantes de Funtierra Tania Otero Arroyo y Eduardo Padilla Hernández.

The authorities found that the government of Córdoba made payments to the following IPS:

* Funtierra Rehabilitation LTDA Foundation: with legal representative, dentist Tania Otero Arroyo, and legal advisor Eduardo Padilla Hernández.

- Grow and Smile S.A.S. Rehabilitation Unit: owned by Yolima Rangel Yáñez.
- Integral Unit of Therapies of the Coast S.A.S.: Ana Karina Elías is accused of being the head of this IPS and is married to the former secretary of health of Córdoba Alfredo Aruachán Narváez. Ana Karina is the cousin of the former senator of the republic Bernardo "Ñoño" Elías, a political and criminal ally of the brothers Musa and Edwin Besayle. The legal representative of this IPS is Diana Carolina Spath Espinosa, who is the cousin of Sami Spath Storino, friend and partner of Alejandro Lyons .
- IPS Girasoles Comprehensive Center for Therapies and Health Services S.A.S.:.

The Deputy Prosecutor before the Supreme Court of Justice of Colombia filed an indictment against Lyons and Edwin Besayle for the crimes of "contract without compliance with legal requirements and embezzlement for appropriation in criminal co-participation." The embezzlement in the Lyons government would have been due to payments to the IPS for COP$26,220 million pesos, while Governor Besayle authorized payments to the IPS for an amount close to COP$175 million.

The Attorney General's Office found Edwin Besayle responsible for not exercising "the duty of vigilance and control over the actions" of his Secretary of Health, José Jaime Pareja, who paid the IPS.

With the uncovering of the Cartel de la toga, a conversation came to light between the former governor Alejandro Lyons and the lawyer Leonardo Pinilla, in which Pinilla told Lyons that Edwin Besayle has " I already had the arrest warrant ready for Tania Otero within the process that the Prosecutor's Office is carrying out for the health resources of the department of Córdoba", referring to the fact that they would alter the process.

The authorities announced that the owner of the IPS Crecer y Sonreír Unidad de Rehabilitation S.A.S., Yolima Rangel Yáñez bribed the then prosecutor Daniel Díaz for COP$200 million pesos, linked to the network of the cartel de la toga of the magistrates and with the anti-corruption prosecutor Luis Gustavo Moreno, so that the Prosecutor's Office acquitted her of the therapy corruption case, in addition to diverting the investigation against Funtierra's legal representative, the dentist Tania Otero Arroyo.

=== Down syndrome cartel ===
The Colombian control entities also detected irregularities in the contracting of health services by the government of Córdoba for children diagnosed with Down Syndrome, and reported that the embezzlement would have reached an amount of COP$ 10 billion pesos in false therapies. Embezzlement also occurred in the administrations of Alejandro Lyons and Edwin Besayle.

In the Down Syndrome cartel, Ana Karina Elías is linked, who is the cousin of the former senator of the Cordoban republic Bernardo "Ñoño" Elías, a political and criminal ally of the Musa brothers and Edwin Besayle.

== Dismissal ==
Due to the hemophilia cartel, the governor of Córdoba Besayle was initially suspended from office for three months, but then in April 2018, the Attorney General's Office extended the suspension for another three months.

His departmental health secretary, José Jaime Pareja Alemán, was dismissed and disqualified for 13 years.

In January 2019, the Office of the Attorney General of the Nation completed the process of notification, dismissal and disqualification for 10 years of Edwin Besayle to hold public office. The dismissal of Besayle generated delays in numerous infrastructure works that were under development as part of the Department's Land Management Plan (POT), including numerous road works that were paralyzed and key works such as the Valencia bridge

Besayle was replaced by Sandra Patricia Devia, who was appointed acting governor on March 5, 2019 until the end of the period of departmental government; on December 31, 2019. Devia was chosen in the list presented by the Partido de la U, before the President of the Nation Iván Duque

Party political offices
Preceded by Alejandro Lyons	Party of the U nominee for Governor of Córdoba; 2016-2018	Succeeded by Erasmo Zuleta
Political offices
Preceded by Alejandro Lyons	Governor of Córdoba; 2016-2018	Succeeded by Orlando Benítez
