= Héctor Olimpo Espinosa =

Colombian politician (born 1981)

Governor of Sucre
- In office January 1, 2020 – December 31, 2023
- Preceded by: Édgar Martínez Romero
- Succeeded by: Lucy Inés García

Personal details
- Born: June 11, 1981 (age 44) Sincé, Sucre, Colombia
- Party: Colombian Liberal Party
- Parents: Gabriel Antonio Espinosa (father); Karina Espinosa (mother)

Héctor Olimpo Espinosa Oliver (born June 11, 1981) is a Colombian politician. From 2020 to 2023, he served as governor of Sucre. From 2008 to 2011, he served as mayor of Sincé.
