= Governor of Córdoba =

Governor of Córdoba may refer to

- Governor of Córdoba, Argentina
- Governor of Córdoba (Colombian department)
  - List of governors of Córdoba (Colombian department)
