= Orlando Benítez =

Colombian politician and economist (born 1983)

46th Governor of Córdoba
- In office 1 January 2020 – 31 December 2023
- Preceded by: Edwin Besaile
- Succeeded by: Erasmo Zuleta

Member of the Departmental Assembly of Córdoba
- In office 1 January 2008 – 31 December 2011
- Constituency: Liberal

Personal details
- Born: Orlando David Benítez Mora; 16 March 1983 (age 43) Valencia, Córdoba, Colombia
- Party: Liberal (2008-present)
- Spouse: Martha Ruiz (m. 2008)
- Education: Pontifical Bolivarian University; Pontifical Xavierian University
- Occupation: Politician
- Profession: Businessman

Orlando David Benítez Mora (born 16 March 1983) is a Colombian economist and politician who served as a Member of the Departmental Assembly of Córdoba from 2008 to 2011 and as Governor of Córdoba from 2020 to 2023.

Born in Valencia, Córdoba, Benítez is a prominent member of the Liberal party. He holds a degree in Economics from the Pontifical Bolivarian University.

== Early life ==
Son of the liberal leader Orlando Benítez Palencia, he was born in Valencia, in Córdoba, in 1983. He studied Development Economics at the Universidad Pontificia Bolivariana, specializing in Public Management at the same institution. He also specialized in Government and Public Management at the Pontificia Universidad Javeriana. He completed a master's degree in Government and Public Policy at the Externado de Colombia University, with a double degree from Columbia University in New York. Likewise, he is an Accounting Technician from the CENSA Institute of Montería.

He began his political career in the Liberal Party, in the company of his father, who would be assassinated in 2005 by paramilitaries under the command of "Don Berna", since Benítez Palencia was doing politics in the municipality without authorization from those criminal structures. The crime occurred in the midst of the Peace Process between the Government of Álvaro Uribe and the paramilitaries, which caused the talks to be suspended and "Don Berna" to be captured, who, in 2010, was sentenced to 45 years in prison for the crime.

== Governor of Cordoba ==
Benítez then decided to participate in the Colombian regional elections of 28 October 2019 by postulating his name for the Governorship of Córdoba Department. In the internal election of the Colombian Liberal Party Verano was the only candidate for what the president of the Liberal party.

As governor of the Department of Córdoba. Benitez has carried out a task against the corruption scandals in which his two predecessors found themselves involved.

In his administration as Governor of Córdoba, a large investment has been made in terms of road infrastructure, with road connectivity being one of his main drivers in his management, as well as his good management in the covid health emergency, with Cordoba being the 10th largest department. affected by the crisis.

Party political offices
Preceded by Arleth Casado	Liberal nominee for Governor of Córdoba; 2018	Succeeded by Erasmo Zuleta
Political offices
Preceded by Edwin Besaile	Governor of Córdoba; 2020–2023	Succeeded by Erasmo Zuleta
