= Erasmo Zuleta =

Colombian politician (born 1989)

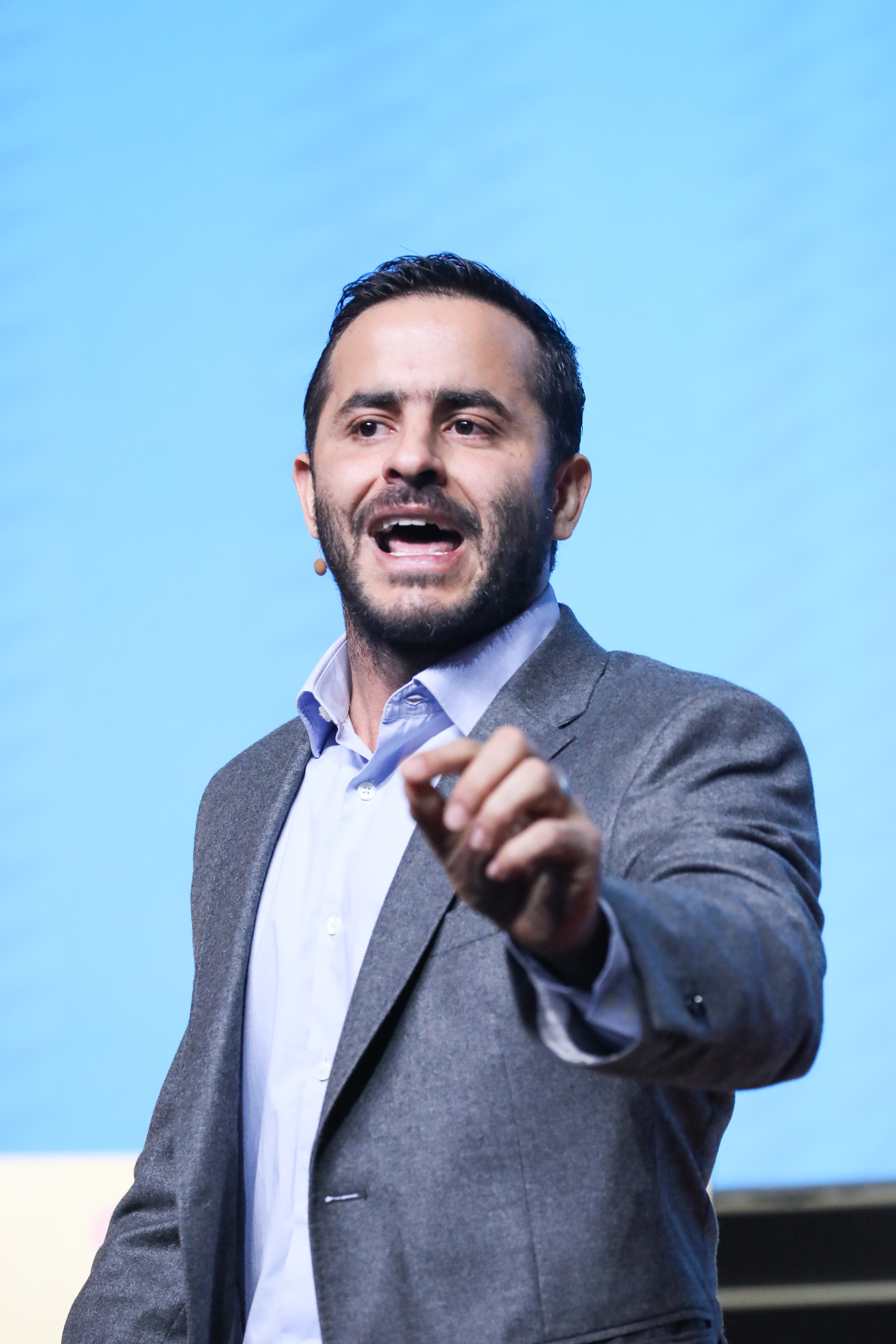

47th Governor of Córdoba
- Incumbent
- Assumed office 1 January 2024
- Preceded by: Orlando Benítez

Member of the Chamber of Representatives
- In office 20 July 2018 – 20 July 2022
- Constituency: Córdoba

Personal details
- Born: Erasmo Elías Zuleta Bechara; 16 November 1989 (age 36) Monteria, Córdoba, Colombia
- Party: Union Party for the People (2013-present)
- Spouse: Valeria Vega (m. 2017)
- Relatives: Elías Bechara Zainúm (grandfather)
- Education: Sinú University (BBA); University of Quebec
- Occupation: Politician
- Profession: Businessman

Erasmo Elías Zuleta Bechara (born 16 November 1989) is a Colombian politician and business administrator, from 2018 to 2022 he served as a member of the Chamber of Representatives representing the department of Córdoba, serving on the Third Commission of the Chamber. He would later be elected as Governor of Córdoba during the 2023 Córdoba regional election through his Córdoba First movement, receiving political support from the Union Party for the People, and the Liberal party.

He is a business administrator from the University of Sinú and has a master's degree in Organization Management from the same university in agreement with the EAN University and the University of Quebec, Canada.

== Governor of Córdoba (2024-present) ==
On Friday, November 1, 2023, as Elected-Governor Erasmo, along with his wife Valeria, held a meeting with Governor Orlando Benítez and his wife, First Lady Marta Ruiz, at the Naim Palace. Where they discussed generalities about Córdoba and some of the parts of the transition process between Zuleta and Benitez.

On Monday, November 13, 2023, Zuleta received from the National Electoral Council and the National Civil Registry, the credential that accredited his election as Governor of Córdoba. On Thursday, December 7, 2023, Zuleta held a meeting with the Minister of Housing Catalina Velasco, accompanied by Mauren Jabib and Camilo Mejía, where the government agreed to co-finance the housing improvement plan from which 5,000 families will benefit in the first stage.

On Tuesday, February 10, 2024, Zuleta after his visit to the property where a new headquarters of the University of Córdoba will be built for the municipalities of Valencia and Tierralta, this in order to establish the regionalization of higher education in Córdoba.

Party political offices
Preceded by Edwin Besaile	Union Party for the People nominee for Governor of Córdoba; 2023	Incumbent
Preceded by Orlando Benítez	Liberal nominee for Governor of Córdoba; 2023	Incumbent
Political offices
Preceded by Orlando Benítez	Governor of Córdoba; 2024-2027	Incumbent
