= Alejandro Lyons =

Colombian politician and lawyer

44th Governor of Córdoba
- In office January 1, 2012 – December 31, 2015
- Preceded by: Marta Sáenz
- Succeeded by: Edwin Besaile

Personal details
- Born: Alejandro José Lyons Muskus; April 25, 1981 (age 45) Sahagún, Córdoba, Colombia
- Party: Party of the U
- Education: Externado University of Colombia (LLB)

Alejandro José Lyons Muskus (born April 25, 1981) is a Colombian lawyer and politician, former governor of the department of Córdoba, currently involved in multiple acts of corruption in Colombia.

Lyons worked with Bernardo "Ñoño" Elías Vidal and Musa Besaile, and assigned royalty contracts for COP$65 billion pesos with the Fund for Innovation, Science and Technology that were never executed, but the money ended up with figureheads of Lyons, Elías and Besaile This, added to other summary contracts, embezzles the department of Córdoba for COP$500 billion pesos, contracts for which they would have charged contractors commissions of 30 percent. The network of contractors includes as beneficiaries relatives of Lyons, Elías and Besaile, as well as allied political groups and friends in Córdoba.

Lyons has accumulated more than 20 processes for corruption in Colombia that accumulate an embezzlement of COP $107 billion pesos, and in 2017 he went to the United States with his family, where he began to collaborate with the authorities of that country as an "informant", and helped uncover the network of corruption in Colombian justice known as the cartel de la toga. On December 5, 2018, the Attorney General's Office dismissed and disqualified Lyons from holding public office for 15 years.

His friend, accomplice and partner Sami Spath, in charge of diverting and distributing the money resulting from corruption, was captured in Italy, on May 12, 2018, by means of a red notice from Interpol.

== Early life ==
Alejandro is the son of Alejandro Eugenio Lyons De la Espriella and Luz Helena Muskus García. He is the first cousin of Sara Piedrahíta Lyons, who has been a representative to the Chamber for the department of Córdoba.

=== Family ===
Lyons married Johanna Elías Vidal in October 2013, from whose union three daughters were born: Sara, Elena and Elisa Lyons Elías. Johanna es hermana del político Bernardo "Ñoño" Elías Vidal.

Alejandro Lyons is a cousin of the lawyer Luis Ignacio Lyons, who was involved in the bribery and corruption case known as the cartel de la toga.

== Education ==
Muskus studied law at the Universidad Externado and obtained a specialization in Criminal Procedural Law. He has studies in Constitutional Law and State Contracting.

=== Lawyer for parapoliticians ===
After graduating Muskus practiced law as a trial lawyer in Bogotá. Several of his clients were involved in the Parapolitics scandal, in which politicians and public officials made alliances with paramilitary groups outside the law of the United Self-Defense Forces of Colombia (AUC).

Among his clients was the former governor of the department of Sucre, Salvador Arana, who ended up sentenced to 40 years in prison for being the intellectual author of the murder of the former mayor of El Roble, Sucre, Tito Díaz.

== Governor of Córdoba (2012 - 2015) ==
Lyons was elected in the 2011 Colombian regional elections for the governorship of Córdoba with the support of the Partido de la U in his department; senators Bernardo Elías, Musa Besaile, former senator Zulema Jattin, Margarita Andrade, Martín Morales Diz and former congressman Miguel De La Espriella. Lyons got a vote of more than 341,000 votes. His followers began to be called the "Lyonists".

He faced the powerful liberal clan of the López Cabrales, led by former Congressman Juan Manuel López Cabrales, and his wife, Senator Arleth Casado.

Due to the corruption scandals with Elías and Besaile, Lyons tried to distance himself and create alliances with senators Nora García, Arleth Casado and Yamina Pestana, in addition to readjusting his departmental cabinet.

At the beginning of his administration in the government of Córdoba, according to Las2orillas, Lyons came to be considered the "second best governor" of Colombia", and when he finished he was considered among the most corrupt rulers of Córdoba, according to Revista Semana.

=== Concession of the Chance in Córdoba ===
Governor Lyons handed over the Chance (bets) concession in Córdoba to an individual named Pedro Ghisays Chadid, who was identified by the Attorney General's Office as a front man for the narco-paramilitary chief Salvatore Mancuso of the United Self-Defense Forces of Colombia and the Northern Bloc of the AUC.

=== Embezzlement of royalties from Córdoba ===
The administration of Lyons Muskus made the award of four cooperation agreements for science and technology for COP$85,700 million pesos, financed with resources from the General System of Royalties and authorized in the Collegiate Body of Administration and Decision.

=== Hemophilia cartel ===
As governor of Córdoba, Lyons authorized a contract in which COP$44 billion pesos were disbursed from the government to non-existent Health Provider Institutions (IPS) to carry out treatments for high-cost patients suffering from hemophilia, however, patients that they registered turned out to be non-existent or did not suffer from the reported diseases, and they charged money for medicines not contemplated in the Compulsory Health Plan.

The health secretaries of his administration Alexis José Gaines Acuña, Alfredo Aruachán Narváez, Edwin Preciado Lorduy were involved in the scandal. the legal representative of Funtierra Rehabilitation Limited Medical Services, Tania Otero; and the medical auditor Juan David Náder Chejne.

The health corruption scandal continued in the governorship of Edwin Besaile with his officials.

Party political offices
Preceded by Fabio Amín	Party of the U nominee for Governor of Córdoba; 2012-2016	Succeeded by Edwin Besaile
Political offices
Preceded by Marta Sáenz	Governor of Córdoba; 2012–2015	Succeeded by Edwin Besaile
