= Sahagún (disambiguation) =

Sahagún can refer to:

- Sahagún, Spain, a town and monastery in Léon, Spain. Cradle of the Mudéjar architecture
- Sahagún, Córdoba, the second town in population in Córdoba Department, Colombia, also called "The Cultural City of Cordoba"
- Ciudad Sahagún, an industrial city in the state of Hidalgo, Mexico.

People

- Agustín Rodríguez Sahagún (1932–1991), Spanish politician. Mayor of Madrid from 1989 to 1991
- Bernardino de Sahagún (1499–1590), Franciscan scholar and chronicler of Aztec ethnohistory in the Florentine Codex
- Saint John of Sahagun
- Marta Sahagún, Mexican politician and First Lady 2001–2006
