= 2023 Córdoba regional election =

Regional election in Colombia

- October 29, 2023
Governor before election
Orlando Benítez
Liberal
Elected Governor
Erasmo Zuleta
Unionist

The 2023 Córdoba regional election will be held on October 29, 2023, in the department of Córdoba, where the following positions will be elected for a period of four years from January 1, 2024.

== Governor elections ==
=== Nominee ===
==== Independent ====
- Juan Martínez Petro, Certified public accountant

==== Force of the Peace party ====
- Yésica Cabeza Del Toro, President of the Peace Force

==== Broad Democratic Alliance party ====
- Angélica Verbel López, Candidate for Senate 2022

==== Union Party for the People ====
- Erasmo Zuleta, Representative to the Chamber

==== Democratic Centre party ====
- Ciro de Léon, Agricultural engineer

==== Historic Pact coalition ====
- Gabriel Calle, Council of Montelíbano

=== Results ===
Córdoba governor election
Party	Candidate	Votes	%
Party of the U	Erasmo Zuleta	532,009	61.03 %
Humane Colombia	Gabriel Calle	271,891	31.19 %
Independent	Juan de la Cruz Martínez	13,360	1.53 %
ADA	Angélica Verbel	9,073	1.04 %
Independent	Ciro de León	7,643	0.87 %
Invalid or blank votes		37,649	4.31 %
Total votes		833,976	95.68 %

== Mayoral elections ==
=== Ayapel ===
Ayapel mayoral election
Party	Candidate	Votes	%
ASI	Hugo Pinedo	13,396	53.56 %
Liberal	Maricel Nader	11,084	44.32 %
Colombian Ecologist Party	Eduardo Barreto	238	0.95 %
Green Alliance	Gelson Tovar	39	0.15 %
National Salvation	Nemesio Nader	18	0.07 %
Invalid or blank votes		234	0.93 %
Total votes		24,775	99.06 %

=== Buenavista ===
Montelibano mayoral election
Party	Candidate	Votes	%
Independent	Jhon Mario Berrio	7,731	56.59 %
Independent	Calixto Acosta	5,450	39.89 %
ASI	José Gregorio Meza	347	2.54 %
Colombian Ecologist Party	Marta Isabel Álvarez	24	0.17 %
Invalid or blank votes		108	0.79 %
Total votes		13,660	97.54 %

=== Montelibano ===
Montelibano mayoral election
Party	Candidate	Votes	%
Liberal	Gabriel Calle	19,210	46.97 %
Party of the U	Cesar Cura	18,390	44.96 %
ADA	Sandra Milena Angulo	1,780	4.35 %
Independent	Eduin Moreno	186	0.45 %
The Peace Force	María Lucia Morato	137	0.33 %
Humane Colombia	Jorge Eliecer Mazo	113	0.27 %
Colombia Reborn	José Oberlan Martínez	111	0.27 %
Radical Change	José David Nader	79	0.19 %
Colombian Ecologist Party	María Elena Beleño	45	0.11 %
Green Alliance	Alcira Guerra	36	0.08 %
PDA	Jorge Emilio Martínez	29	0.07 %
Invalid or blank votes		782	1.91 %
Total votes		40,898	96.63 %

=== Monteria ===
Monteria mayoral election
Party	Candidate	Votes	%
Independent	Hugo Kerguelen	114,675	50.22 %
Independent	Natalia López Fuentes	88,180	38.62 %
Fuerza Ciudadana (Colombia); ('Citizen Force')	Yalenis Manzon	5,572	2.44 %
Oxygen Green Party	Elías Boada	4,447	1.94 %
The Peace Force	Luis Alfredo Jiménez	1,328	0.58 %
Independent	Liliana Yunez Luquetta	1,171	0.51 %
Colombian Ecologist Party	Óscar Hoyos	867	0.37 %
Colombian Democratic Party	José Ignacio Burgos	300	0.13 %
Invalid or blank votes		11,765	5.15 %
Total votes		216,540	94.84 %

=== Planeta Rica ===
Planeta Rica mayoral election
Party	Candidate	Votes	%
Independent	Ramón Calle	16,141	43.17 %
Independent	Gabriel Méndez Pineda	15,449	41.32 %
Independent	Germán Angulo	5,128	13.71 %
Humane Colombia	Edwin Álvarez	121	0.32 %
ASI	René Arrieta	58	0.15 %
Invalid or blank votes		491	1.31 %
Total votes		36,897	98.68 %
