= Valencia Municipality =

Valencia Municipality may refer to:

- Valencia, Córdoba, Colombia
- Valencia, Bohol, Philippines
- Valencia, Negros Oriental, Philippines
- Valencia Municipality, Carabobo, Venezuela
