= Libardo José López =

Colombian politician (born 1948)

42nd Governor of Córdoba
- In office 1 January 2004 – 31 December 2007; Suspended:17 April 2006 - 22 June 2007
- Preceded by: Jesús María López
- Succeeded by: Marta Sáenz

Personal details
- Born: Libardo José López Cabrales; 5 December 1948 (age 77) Bogotá, D.C., Colombia
- Party: Liberal
- Education: National University of Colombia
- Occupation: Politician
- Profession: Engineer

Libardo José López Cabrales (born 5 December 1948) is a Colombian politician and engineer. From 2004 to 2007, he served as Governor of Córdoba.

Party political offices
Preceded by Franklin Vega	Liberal nominee for Governor of Córdoba; 2008-2011	Succeeded by Marta Sáenz
Political offices
Preceded by Jesus María López	Governor of Córdoba; 2004-2007	Succeeded by Marta Sáenz
