= 2023 Colombian regional and municipal elections =

Election in Colombia

← 2019	October 29, 2023	2027 →

The 2023 Colombian regional and municipal elections were held on 29 October 2023. 32 governors and departmental assemblies and 1,102 mayors were elected.

== Elections ==
=== Antioquia ===
Antioquia governor election
Party	Candidate	Votes	%
Democratic Center	Andrés Julián Rendon	944,239	36.78 %
Independent	Luis Pérez	597,667	23.28 %
Independent	Luis Fernando Suárez	355,609	13.85 %
Independents Movement	Esteban Restrepo	232,605	9.06 %
Independent	Mauricio Tobon	55,137	2.14 %
Colombian Democratic Party	Julián Bedoya	53,474	2.08 %
Conservative	Juan Diego Gómez	33,776	1.31 %
Dignity	Jorge Alberto Gómez	18,171	0.70 %
Independent	Cristian Halaby	13,229	0.51 %
	Robinson Giraldo	7,483	0.29 %
Invalid or blank votes		255,266	9.94 %
Total votes		2,566,656	89.44 %

=== Amazonas ===
Amazonas gubernatorial election
Party	Candidate	Votes	%
Historic Pact	Óscar Enrique Sánchez	14,256	45.30 %
Party of the U	Octavio Benjumea	13,934	44.28 %
The Peace Force	José Huber Araújo	2,271	7.21 %
Fuerza Ciudadana (Colombia); ('Citizen Force')	Julio Cueva Márquez	140	0.44 %
Colombian Democratic Party	Casimiro Cabrera	58	0.18 %
Invalid or blank votes		807	2.56 %
Total votes		31,466	96.28 %

=== Atlántico ===
Atlántico governor election
Party	Candidate	Votes	%
Liberal	Eduardo Verano de la Rosa	536,243	48.75 %
Independent	Alfredo Varela	337,005	30.64 %
Fuerza Ciudadana (Colombia); ('Citizen Force')	Claudia Patiño	62,413	5.67 %
ADA	Reymundo Marenco	17,669	1.60 %
MSN	Juan José Acuña	12,289	1.11 %
Colombian Ecologist Party	Edgar Manrique	8,404	0.76 %
Invalid or blank votes		125,774	11.43 %
Total votes		1,099,797	86.41 %

=== Bolivar ===
Bolivar governor election
Party	Candidate	Votes	%
Independent	Yamil Arana	598,679	70.09 %
MSN	Said Adechine	44,185	5.17 %
Colombian Democratic Party	Yoland Wong	41,556	4.86 %
Dignity	David Munera	15,682	1.83 %
LIGA	Mary Luz Londoño	13,759	1.61 %
Independent	German Zapata	13,684	1.60 %
Democratic Hope	Lutterh Larios	7,676	0.89 %
ADA	Luis Enrrique Florez	5,793	0.67 %
Colombian Ecologist Party	Carlos Javier Ramos	4,746	0.55 %
Invalid or blank votes		108,356	12.68 %
Total votes		745,760	87.31 %

=== Cesar ===
Cesar governor election
Party	Candidate	Votes	%
Independent	Elvia Sanjuan	231,219	44.13 %
Democratic Center	Claudia Zuleta	183,583	35.03 %
Independent	Katia Ospino	43,452	8.29 %
Historic Pact	Alexander Pineda	27,804	5.30 %
Independent	Antonio Sanguino	5,261	1.00 %
New Democratic Force	Lineth Pana Torres	3,976	0.75 %
ASI	Kaleb Villalobos	2,819	0.53 %
The Force of the Peace	José Luis Mayorca	2,390	0.45 %
Colombian Democratic Party	Luz Heli Villalobos	625	0.11 %
Invalid or blank votes		22,808	4.35 %
Total votes		501,129	95.64 %

=== Córdoba ===
Córdoba governor election
Party	Candidate	Votes	%
Party of the U	Erasmo Zuleta	532,009	61.03 %
Humane Colombia	Gabriel Calle	271,891	31.19 %
Independent	Juan de la Cruz Martínez	13,360	1.53 %
ADA	Angélica Verbel	9,073	1.04 %
Independent	Ciro de León	7,643	0.87 %
Invalid or blank votes		37,649	4.31 %
Total votes		833,976	95.68 %

=== Guajira ===
Guajira governor election
Party	Candidate	Votes	%
Independent	Jairo Alfonso Aguilar	187,897	57.82 %
Independent	Jimmy Boscan	87,841	27.03 %
Independent	Laura Andriolis	20,833	6.41 %
Historic Pact	Wilmer Navarro	8,346	2.56 %
Invalid or blank votes		20,045	6.16 %
Total votes		304,917	93.83 %

=== Magdalena ===
Magdalena governor election
Party	Candidate	Votes	%
Independent	Rafael Martínez	306,057	50.75 %
Independent	Mallath Martínez	102,647	17.02 %
Independent	Franklin Lozano	96,384	15.98 %
Independent	Edgardo Pérez	38,697	6.41 %
Independent	Edward Torres	12,438	2.06 %
Independent	Martha Altahona	3,679	0.61 %
Independent	Oscar Sininng	1,960	0.32 %
Invalid or blank votes		41,110	6.81 %
Total votes		561,862	93.18 %

=== Sucre ===
Sucre governor election
Party	Candidate	Votes	%
Independent	Lucy Inés García	221,492	45.87 %
On Going	Mario Fernández Alcocer	200,984	41.62 %
Green Alliance	Juan David Diaz	13,422	2.77 %
Humane Colombia	Remberto Benítez	6,483	1.34 %
PDA	Enoc Miranda	5,203	1.07 %
Patriotic Union (Colombia)	Inge Rodriguez	3,239	0.67 %
Resurgent Colombia	Iván Feris	2,445	0.50 %
Colombian Ecologist Party	Julio Miguel Guerra	1,340	0.27 %
Colombian Democratic Party	Enrique Ledesma	1,175	0.24 %
Invalid or blank votes		27,037	5.59 %
Total votes		482,820	87.91 %
