= List of governors of Córdoba =

The list of governors of Córdoba may refer to:

- List of governors of Córdoba (Colombian department)
- List of governors of Córdoba (Argentine province)
