= Lucy Inés García =

Colombian politician and bacteriologist

Governor of Sucre
- Incumbent
- Assumed office 1 January 2024
- Preceded by: Héctor Olimpo Espinosa

Mayor of Sincé
- In office 1 January 2016 – 31 December 2019
- Preceded by: Mara Merlano Espinosa
- Succeeded by: Luis Miguel Acosta

Personal details
- Born: Lucy Inés García Montes Sincelejo, Sucre, Colombia
- Party: Party of the U
- Occupation: Politician
- Profession: Bacteriologist, specialist in public management

Lucy Inés García Montes is a Colombian bacteriologist, specialist in public management and politician. On October 29, 2023, she was elected Governor of Sucre during the 2023 Regional elections.

Party political offices
Preceded by Eduardo Enrique Pérez	Democratic Center nominee for Governor of Sucre; 2023	Incumbent
Political offices
Preceded by Mara Merlano Espinosa	Mayor of Sincé; 2016-2019	Succeeded by Luis Miguel Acosta
Preceded by Héctor Olimpo Espinosa	Governor of Sucre; 2024-2027	Incumbent
