= 2011 Colombian regional and municipal elections =

Colombian regional and municipal elections

← 2007	October 30, 2011	2015 →
- Registered: 30,615,748
- Turnout: 17,480,981

The 2011 Colombian regional and municipal elections were held on 30 October 2011, to elect the governors of 32 departments and their Department Assemblies, the mayors of 1,099 municipalities and their city councils, and the Local Administrative Juntas (JAL) of national territories.

== Background ==
=== Bogotá ===
The last mayor elected in Bogotá before the 2011 elections, Samuel Moreno, was suspended after a scandal over public works bids by Colombia's inspector general. He was replaced by an interim mayor, Clara López Obregón, until the 2011 elections.

== Pre-election violence ==
Leading up to the elections, 41 candidates were assassinated with many others receiving threats against their lives or those of their family. Then President Juan Manuel Santos deployed 300,000 troops in an effort to prevent violence against candidates and voters. Electoral Observation Mission (MOE), a Colombian civil society network active in election monitoring training, created a crowdsourcing website, "Pilas con el Voto" (vote watch), just prior to the elections to encourage both anonymous and non-anonymous reporting of election-related violence and irregularities in the voting itself and for publishing maps and analyses of these.

== Results ==
2011 Bogotá Mayoral Race results by locality: Enrique Peñalosa; Gustavo Petro

Among the winners of the 2011 elections was future 34th President Gustavo Petro. Petro ran and won a campaign for the mayor of Bogotá, the nation's capital city, under the Progresistas Party against Green Party and Union Party for the People candidate, and former mayor, Enrique Peñalosa Londoño as well as independent Gina Parody.

The first independent mayor of Medellín, Sergio Fajardo, successfully ran for Governor of Medellín's Antioquia Department under the Green Party.

A notable losing candidate was María Isabel Urrutia, an Olympic weightlifter who won Colombia's first gold medal in 2000; she unsuccessfully ran for mayor of Cali under the Alternative Democratic Pole. She would later be appointed as Minister of Sports in Gustavo Petro's Cabinet.

A number of candidates for mayoral, municipal, and gubernatorial offices were alleged to have ties with paramilitaries. This included around 1 in 4 or 25% of the elected governors.

=== Governorates by department ===
Department	Candidate	Party	Votes	%
Amazonas	Carlos Arturo Rodríguez Celis	Green Party	7.696	33.75%
Amazonas	Rafael Elizalde Gómez	Radical Change Party	6.453	28,30%
Amazonas	Guillermo Marín Torres	Inclusion and Opportunities Movement	4.678	20,51%
Antioquia	Sergio Fajardo Valderrama	Green Party	925.956	49.51%
Antioquia	Álvaro Vásquez Osorio	Colombian Conservative Party	542.533	29,00%
Antioquia	Carlos Mario Estrada Molina	Union Party for the People	244.179	13,05%
Arauca	José Facundo Castillo Cisneros	Union Party for the People	35.506	44,48%
Arauca	Carlos Eduardo Pinilla Ruiz	Radical Change Party	23.392	29,30%
Atlántico	José Antonio Segebre Berardinelli	Colombian Liberal Party	340.312	46,62%
Atlántico	Jaime Alejandro Amín Hernández	Union Party for the People	239.761	32,86%
Bolívar	Juan Carlos Gossain Roginini	Colombian Liberal Party	273.629	43.54%
Bolívar	Rosario Cecilia Ricardo Bray	Union Party for the People	229.616	36,54%
Bolívar	Dionisio Miranda Tejedor	Alternative Democratic Pole	44.172	7,02%
Boyacá	Juan Carlos Granados Becerra	Union Party for the People	280.278	51.79%
Boyacá	Gonzalo Guarín Vivas	Green Party	129.809	23,98%
Boyacá	León Gioberto Barón Neira	Colombian Conservative Party	103.042	19,04%
Caldas	Guido Echeverry Piedrahita	Colombian Conservative Party	150.470	42,82%
Caldas	Gabriel Vallejo López	Union Party for the People	142.231	40,50%
Caquetá	Victor Isidro Ramírez Loaiza	Independent Movement of Absolute Renovation	55.084	45.81%
Caquetá	Harry Giovanny Gonzalez García	Colombian Liberal Party	40.312	33,52%
Caquetá	Nelcy Almario Rojas	Colombian Conservative Party	8.584	7,13%
Casanare	Nelson Ricardo Marino Velandia	Afrolives Political Movements	54.890	35.69%
Casanare	Jorge Elieser Prieto Riveros	Green Party	25.214	16,39%
Casanare	José Alirio Guzmán Guzmán	Radical Change Party	24.227	15,175%
Casanare	Efren Antonio Hernández Díaz	National Integration Party	23.342	15,18%
Cauca	Temístocles Ortega Narvaez	Independent Social Alliance	196.081	45.94%
Cauca	Juan Carlos López Castrillón	Colombian Liberal Party	135.580	31,76%
Cauca	Luis Eduardo Campo Castillo	Independent Movement of Absolute Renovation	26.152	6,12%
Cesar	Luis Alberto Monsalvo Gnecco	Union Party for the People	174.712	49.51%
Cesar	Arturo Rafael Calderón Rivadeneira	Afrolives Political Movements	126.791	35,93%
Cesar	Ruben Darío Carrillo García	Colombian Conservative Party	18.200	5,15%
Chocó	Luis Gilberto Murillo Urrutia	Radical Change Party-Conservative	52.573	41.65%
Chocó	Oscar Bernardo Palacios Sánchez	Union Party for the People	41.111	35,93%
Chocó	Francisco Wilson Córdoba López	Colombian Liberal Party	23.424	18,56%
Córdoba	Alejandro José Lyons Muskus	Union Party for the People	341.460	52.71%
Córdoba	Victor Raul Oyola Daniells	Colombian Liberal Party	283.568	43,77%
Cundinamarca	Álvaro Cruz Vargas	Union Party for the People	608.977	67.69%
Cundinamarca	Everth Bustamante Garcia	Unite Movement	119.787	13,31%
Guainía	Oscar Armando Rodríguez Sánchez	Colombian Liberal Party	4.610	39.13%
Guainía	Tocayo Carrizosa Falla	Union Party for the People	3.246	27,55%
Guainía	Anatalio Hernández Lozano	Colombian Conservative Party	2.796	23,73%
Guaviare	José Octaviano Rivera Moncada	Independent Social Alliance	9.777	35.00%
Guaviare	Alexander Garcia Rodríguez	Union Party for the People	8.834	31,63%
Guaviare	José Alberto Pérez Restrepo	Colombian Conservative Party	7.561	27,07%
Huila	Cielo Gonzalez Villa	Union Party for the People	147.612	35.03%
Huila	Carlos Mauricio Iriarte Barrios	Colombian Liberal Party	142.017	33,70%
Huila	Jorge Fernando Perdomo Polonia	Colombian Conservative Party	114.846	27,25%
La Guajira	Juan Francisco Gómez Cerchar	Radical Change Party	126.939	52.34%
La Guajira	Bladimiro Nicolas Cuello Daza	Colombian Conservative Party	106.620	43.96%
Magdalena	Luis Miguel Cotes Habeych	Respect Movement for Magdalena	171.153	41.90%
Magdalena	José Luis Pinedo Campo	Radical Change Party	129.214	31.64%
Magdalena	Licet del Carmen Peñaranda Peña	Independent Social Alliance	72.128	17.66%
Meta	Alan Edmundo Jara Urzola	Lets Go for Alante	150.114	41.92%
Meta	Wilmar Orlando Barbosa Rozo	Union Party for the People	132.480	37,00%
Meta	Hernán Gómez Nino	Green Party	61.582	17.20%
Nariño	Segundo Raul Delgado Guerrero	Unity Regional	280.308	49.00%
Nariño	Germán Chamorro de la Rosa	Union Party for the People	247.598	43.29%
Norte de Santander	Edgar Jesús Diaz Contreras	Onward Un Norte	291.389	59.76%
Norte de Santander	Juan Alcides Santaella Gutierrez	Colombian Conservative Party	132.625	27.20%
Norte de Santander	Rafael Mora Bonilla	Alternative Democratic Pole	12.363	2.53%
Putumayo	Jimmy Harold Diaz Burbano	Colombian Conservative Party	53.797	53.29%
Putumayo	Ivan Gerardo Guerrero Guevara	Colombian Liberal Party	33.636	33.32%
Putumayo	Carlos Olmedo Jimenez Toro	Alternative Democratic Pole	4.282	4.24%
Quindío	Sandra Paola Hurtado Palacio	Quindío Firme Movement	86.071	40.22%
Quindío	Belen Sanchez Caceres	Union Party for the People	74.744	34.92%
Quindío	Martha Liliana Agudelo Valencia	Independent Movement of Absolute Renovation	20.870	9.75%
Risaralda	Carlos Alberto Botero López	Inclusive National Unity with Results	127.168	38.45%
Risaralda	Sigifredo Salazar Osorio	Colombian Conservative Party	97.177	29.38%
Risaralda	Martha Cecilia Alzate Alzate	Independent Movement of Absolute Renovation	38.835	11.74%
San Andrés	Aury Socorro Guerrero Bowie	Colombian Liberal Party	14.269	61.01%
San Andrés	Susanie Davis Bryan	Go Regional Integration Movement	8.422	36.01%
Santander	Richard Alfonso Aguilar Villa	Santander Seriously	481.362	56.15%
Santander	Luis Fernando Cote Peña	United for Santander	312.094	36.40%
Sucre	Julio Cesar Guerra Tulena	Colombian Liberal Party	204.683	65.49%
Sucre	Gustavo Montes	Indigenous Authorities of Colombia	32.633	10.44%
Sucre	Ramon Emiro Muskus Dumar	National Integration Party	20.086	6.42%
Tolima	Luis Carlos Delgado Peñon	Colombian Liberal Party	243.712	49.22%
Tolima	Luis Fernando Caicedo Lince	Colombian Conservative Party	174.579	35.26%
Tolima	Jorge Enrique Garcia Orjuela	Independent Social Alliance	15.907	3.21%
Valle del Cauca	Héctor Fabio Useche de La Cruz	Inclusion and Opportunities Movement	446.810	33.02%
Valle del Cauca	Jorge Homero Giraldo	Colombian Liberal Party	441.303	32.62%
Valle del Cauca	Ubeimar Delgado Blandon	Colombian Conservative Party and Green Party	197.211	14.57%
Vaupés	Roberto Jaramillo Garcia	Indigenous Authorities of Colombia	6.206	61.26%
Vaupés	Henry Fernando Correal Herrera	Radical Change Party	3.333	32.90%
Vaupés	Rayol Sarmiento Piñeros	Colombian Liberal Party	365	3.60%
Vichada	Sergio Andrés Espinosa Florez	Independent Social Alliance	9.049	44.46%
Vichada	Blas Arvelio Ortiz Rebolledo	Indigenous Authorities of Colombia	6.929	34.04%
Vichada	Henry Silva Meche	Colombian Liberal Party	3.578	17.58%

=== Mayors of department city capitals ===
Department Capital	Candidate	Party	Votes	%
Leticia	José Ignacio Lozano Guzmán	Radical Change Party	4.554	26.92%
Leticia	Juan Carlos Martinez Quiñones	Union Party for the People	3.543	20.94%
Leticia	Hugo Alberto Pérez Araujo	Colombian Liberal Party	2.841	16.79%
Medellín	Anibal Gaviria Correa	Colombian Liberal Party	238.970	37.66%
Medellín	Luis Pérez Gutiérrez	Signatures for the Rescue of Medellín	221.708	34.94%
Medellín	Federico Gutiérrez Zuluaga	Union Party for the People	120.002	18.91%
Arauca	Luis Emilio Tovar Bello	Union Party for the People	12.828	40.52%
Arauca	Dumar Abel Sanchez	Radical Change Party	9.282	29.32%
Arauca	Mario Alberto Valderrama Puerta	Colombian Liberal Party	7.690	24.29%
Barranquilla	Elsa Margarita	Radical Change Party	225.891	58.01%
Barranquilla	Juan Alberto García Estrada	Signatures with Barranquilla	113.281	29.09%
Barranquilla	Antonio Eduardo Bohorquez Collazos	Alternative Democratic Pole	7.141	1.83%
Cartagena	Campo Elías Terán Dix	Independent Social Alliance	158.134	54.72%
Cartagena	María del Socorro Bustamante Ibarra	For a Social Cartagena	52.253	18.08%
Cartagena	Dionisio Fernando Vélez Trujillo	"If Possible" Movement	47.609	16.47%
Tunja	Fernando Florez Espinosa	Green Party	29.546	46.99%
Tunja	Ricardo Hernando Vargas Pérez	Colombian Conservative Party - Colombian Liberal Party. - Union Party for the People	22.700	36.10%
Tunja	Armando Guerrero Castro	Radical Change Party	6.601	10.49%
Manizales	Jorge Eduardo Rojas Giraldo	Colombian Conservative Party - Union Party for the People Alliance	39.966	30.71%
Manizales	José Fernando Mancera Tabares	Citizens' Signatures with Manizales	37.093	28.50%
Manizales	Héctor Jaime Pinilla Ortiz	Green Party	23.605	18.13%
Florencia	María Susana Portela Lozada	Union Party for the People	21.057	37.73%
Florencia	Lucrecia Murcia Lozada	Colombian Liberal Party	13.294	23.82%
Florencia	Alonso Orozco Gomez	Alternative Democratic Pole	12.022	21.54%
Yopal	Willman Enrique Celemin Cáceres	Colombian Liberal Party	30.362	54.68%
Yopal	Carlos Fredy Mejía Rivera	Union Party for the People	9.332	16.80%
Yopal	Luis Eduardo Castro	National Integration Party	7.900	14.22%
Popayán	Francisco Fuentes Meneses	Colombian Conservative Party	29.698	28.77%
Popayán	Víctor Libardo Ramírez Fajardo	Independent Social Alliance	15.644	15.15%
Popayán	Cesar Cristian Gomez Castro	Colombian Liberal Party	14.541	14.08%
Valledupar	Fredys Miguel Socarrás Reales	If We Can	48.640	37.82%
Valledupar	Gonzalo Raul Gomez Soto	Colombian Liberal Party	37.455	29.12%
Valledupar	Augusto Daniel Ramírez Uhia	Radical Change Party	27.463	21.35%
Quibdó	Zulia María Mena García	Radical Change Party	15.631	42.64%
Quibdó	Jafet Bejarano Sánchez	Union Party for the People	12.263	33.45%
Quibdó	Dhorton Pino Serna	Colombian Liberal Party	5.533	15.09%
Montería	Carlos Eduardo Correa Escaf	Colombian Conservative Party	84.181	53.34%
Montería	Daniel Alberto Cabrales Castillo	Union Party for the People	55.340	35.06%
Montería	Rosendo Gabriel Gómez Martínez	Independent Movement of Absolute Renovation	5.707	3.61%
Bogotá	Gustavo Francisco Petro Urrego	Progresistas	721.308	32.16%
Bogotá	Enrique Peñalosa Londoño	Green Party and Union Party for the People	559.307	24.93%
Bogotá	Gina Parody	Mayor Gina Parody	375.574	16.74%
Inírida	Óscar Gerardo Delvasto Lara	Radical Change Party	3.278	35.90%
Inírida	Edgar Efredy Hernández Torres	National Integration Party	2.405	26.34%
Inírida	Henry Ignacio Camico Diaz	Independent Social Alliance	1.972	21.60%
San José del Guaviare	Geovanny Gómez Criales	Green Party	4.800	26.53%
San José del Guaviare	Alexander Harley Bermudez Lasso	Union Party for the People	4.415	24.40%
San José del Guaviare	Julio Arciniegas Cifuentes	Colombian Liberal Party	4.241	23.44%
Neiva	Pedro Hernán Suárez Trujillo	Union Party for the People	59.728	50.12%
Neiva	Rodrigo Armando Lara Sanchez	Green Party	29.700	24.92%
Neiva	Álvaro Hernán Prada Artunduaga	Colombian Liberal Party - Radical Change Party	21.502	18.04%
Riohacha	Rafael Ricardo Ceballos Sierra	Colombian Liberal Party	34.447	63.97%
Riohacha	José Manuel Quintero Medina	Union Party for the People	13.086	24.30%
Riohacha	Ángel Alberto Roys Mejia	Indigenous Authorities of Colombia	3.263	6.06%
Santa Marta	Carlos Caicedo	Colombian Liberal Party	74.165	51.19%
Santa Marta	Alejandro Mario Palacio Valencia	Colombian Conservative Party	40.912	28.24%
Santa Marta	Carlina Cecilia Sanchez Marmolejo	Alternative Democratic Pole	18.161	12.53%
Villavicencio	Juan Guillermo Zuluaga Cardona	Union Party for the People	59.244	33.44%
Villavicencio	Víctor Delio Sánchez Gómez	Colombian Conservative Party	54.376	30.69%
Villavicencio	Luis Alfredo Arias Marcado	Colombian Liberal Party	20.338	11.48%
Pasto	Harold Guerrero López	Radical Change Party	50.326	34.70%
Pasto	Pedro Vicente Obando Ordoñez	Citizens' Movement of Pasto	49.573	34.18%
Pasto	Nicolas Martin Toro Muñoz	Colombian Liberal Party	31.761	21.90%
Cúcuta	Donamaris Ramírez-Paris Lobo	Green Party	104.396	42.62%
Cúcuta	Andrés Cristo Bustos	Colombian Liberal Party	65.272	26.65%
Cúcuta	Rafael Navi Gregorio Angarita Lamk	Union Party for the People	57.284	23.39%
Mocoa	Elver Porfidio Ceron Chicunque	Colombian Conservative Party	8.014	44.52%
Mocoa	José Antonio Castro Melendez	Green Party	6.604	36.69%
Mocoa	Manuel Jesús Gomez Ordoñez	Radical Change Party	1.470	8.16%
Armenia	Luz Piedad Valencia Franco	Colombian Liberal Party	42.937	37.91%
Armenia	Roberto Jairo Jaramillo Cardenas	Advance Armenia	41.443	36.59%
Armenia	Aydee Lizarazo Cubillos	Independent Movement of Absolute Renovation	8.888	7.84%
Pereira	Enrique Antonio Vasquez Zuleta	Union Party for the People - Green Party	69.809	40.20%
Pereira	Juan Manuel Arango Vélez	Party Coalition for Mayor of Pereira	68.003	39.16%
Pereira	Andrés Felipe Ocampo Villegas	Independent Movement of Absolute Renovation	12.682	7.30%
Bucaramanga	Luis Francisco Bohorquez Pedraza	Colombian Liberal Party	120.670	52.83%
Bucaramanga	Martha Elena Pinto De De Hart	Union Party for the People - Colombian Conservative Party	65.122	28.51%
Bucaramanga	Celestino Mojica Peña	Bucaramanga Evolves	24.813	10.86%
Sincelejo	Jairo Alfredo Fernandez Quessep	Union Party for the People	54.727	48.25%
Sincelejo	Carlos Arturo Vergara Montes	Colombian Conservative Party	51.491	45.40%
Sincelejo	Aris Manuel Aguas Jimenez	Green Party	2.072	1.82%
Ibagué	Luis Hernando Rodríguez Ramírez	Colombian Liberal Party	78.233	44.22%
Ibagué	Ricardo Alfonso Ferro Lozano	Union Party for the People	64.744	36.59%
Ibagué	Carlos Andrés Ramírez Rey	Independent Movement of Absolute Renovation	15.894	8.98%
Cali	Rodrigo Guerrero Velasco	Mayor Guerrero (CM)	241.723	42.10%
Cali	Milton Fabián Castrillón Rodríguez	Colombian Conservative Party	113.127	19.70%
Cali	María Isabel Urrutia Ocoro	Alternative Democratic Pole	87.205	15.19%
Mitú	Carlos Iván Ramiro Melendez Moreno	National Integration Party	2.192	28.55%
Mitú	Alcira Gonzalez Ramírez	Union Party for the People	2.154	28.05%
Mitú	Pio V. Castrillon Buitrago	Independent Social Alliance	1.709	22.26%
Puerto Carreño	Álvaro Mauricio Londoño Lugo	Radical Change Party	2.048	30.79%
Puerto Carreño	Luis Antonio Robledo Valbuena	Union Party for the People	1.849	27.80%
Puerto Carreño	Jhon Jairo Rodríguez Guzmán	Colombian Liberal Party	1.693	25.45%

Map of the gubernatorial results for the 2011 elections: Unity Party for the People; Colombian Liberal Party; Colombian Conservative Party; Radical Change Party; Green Party; Independent Movement of Absolute Renovation (MIRA); Independent Social Alliance (ASI); Indigenous Authorities of Colombia (AICO); Signatures/Citizens' Groups

=== Results by party ===
Party	Governors	Deputies	Mayors	Councilors	Total
Union Party for the People	4	74	258	2,054	2,390
Colombian Liberal Party	6	78	181	1,873	2,138
Colombian Conservative Party	1	65	194	1,989	2,249
Radical Change Party	1	50	155	1,448	1,654
Green Party	2	23	49	717	791
Alternative Democratic Pole	0	7	9	231	247
Independent Movement of Absolute Renovation (MIRA)	1	7	1	45	54
Signatures/ Citizens' Groups	14	17	163	750	944
Other Parties	3	16	66	846	931

== See also ==
- 2022 Colombian presidential election
