= Marta Sáenz =

Colombian politician and economist

43rd Governor of Córdoba
- In office 1 January 2008 – 31 December 2011; Suspended:23 April - 15 May 2008
- Preceded by: Libardo José López
- Succeeded by: Alejandro Lyons

Personal details
- Born: Marta del Socorro Sáenz Correa; 9 March 1959 (age 67) Cienaga de Oro, Córdoba, Colombia
- Party: Liberal
- Spouse: Jairo Ruiz Chica
- Education: Universidad del Norte
- Occupation: Politician
- Profession: Lawyer

Marta del Socorro Sáenz Correa (born 9 March 1959) is a Colombian administrator, lawyer and politician. She was governor of Córdoba from 2008 to 2011.

Party political offices
Preceded by Franklin Vega	Liberal nominee for Governor of Córdoba; 2008-2011	Succeeded by Victor Oyola
Political offices
Preceded by Libardo José López	Governor of Córdoba; 2008-2011	Succeeded by Alejandro Lyons
