= University of Córdoba (Colombia) =

- Latin: Universitas Cordubensis
- Motto: Comprometida con el desarrollo regional
- Motto in English: Committed to regional development
- Type: Public, Departmental
- Established: 1962
- Founders: Elías Bechara Zainúm
- Accreditation: MEN
- Rector: Dr. Jairo Torres Oviedo
- Academic staff: 547
- Undergraduates: 11,545
- Location: Montería, Córdoba, Colombia; 8.78778°N 75.8578°W
- Campus: College town / suburb of Berástegui, Sahagún, Lorica and Montelibano
- Colors: Green and white
- Nickname: Jaguars
- Mascot: Iguana
- Website: www.unicordoba.edu.co

The University of Córdoba (UniCor) is a public, departmental, coeducational, research university based in the city of Montería, Córdoba, Colombia. It was founded in 1974 by Elías Bechara Zainúm. Over the next decade, graduate, nursing, and social work programs were established. Starting in 2024, medical school will be established. UniCor is accredited by the Ministry of National Education.
