= Governor of Sucre (Colombian department) =

Head of government of the Department of Sucre

- Arms of Sucre

- Flag of Sucre
- Incumbent; Lucy Inés García since January 1, 2023
- Department of Sucre
- Style: Governor (informal); The Honorable (formal)
- Type: Head of state Head of government
- Residence: None official
- Nominator: Political parties
- Appointer: Popular vote
- Term length: Four years; limited to two consecutive terms
- Constituting instrument: Constitution of Colombia
- Formation: Departments of Colombia: June 1820; Current form: June 1952

The governor of Sucre heads the executive branch of the government of the Sucre Department in Colombia. The governor is the highest-ranking official in the department and is elected by popular vote. The current governor is Lucy Inés García.

== Qualifications ==
The elected governor of Sucré is required to be a citizen of Colombia or be naturalized; to be at least 18 years old; and not hold another political office at the time of the election.

== See also ==
- Governor of Córdoba
