= Electoral Observation Mission (Colombia) =

- Established: 2016 (9 years ago)
- Types: non-governmental organization
- Aim: election monitoring
- Country: Colombia

The Colombian Electoral Observation Mission (Misión de Observación Electoral) or MOE is a Colombian network of civil society organisations involved in the training of citizens for election monitoring since 2006 and in running a crowdsourcing election monitoring website, "Pilas con el Voto", since 2011. It also cooperates in research projects studying election monitoring.

== Creation and aims ==
The Electoral Observation Mission was created in 2006 with the primary aim of encouraging and coordinating the training of volunteers to observe elections in polling stations in Colombia. "Hundreds" of volunteers were involved in MOE's initial offline activities, prior to its development of an online component of election monitoring.

== Leadership, structure and funding ==
As of 2024, the director of MOE was Alejandra Barrios Cabrera, a former student leader of "La Séptima Papeleta" (The Seventh Ballot), a citizens' movement created in response to the assassination of four presidential candidates prior to the 1990 election. MOE runs in practice as an "organisationally brokered network" of civil society groups including trade unions, indigenous organisations and universities according to political scientist Alice Mattoni. As of 2024, MOE had 35 regional offices.

As of 2024, MOE is a member of the Global Network of Domestic Election Monitors.

MOE is mainly funded by aid agencies including the United Nations Development Programme, European Union agencies, Swedish and United States federal government agencies, including the National Endowment for Democracy.

== Actions ==
MOE's training of volunteers in the practical aspects of electoral monitoring are its main activity. It conducted 1636 electoral training workshops from 2006 to 2022. The presence of MOE observers in polling stations increased from being present in twenty percent of municipalities in 2007 to fifty percent in 2018, with an increased probability of observers in places where the risks of violence or fraud are higher. MOE expects observers to follow a protocol, answering both specific questions and open questions based on their observations, with the option to take photos or videos as evidence of electoral fraud.

Prior to each Colombian election, MOE publishes maps on its website showing the risks of electoral fraud or violence (murders, violent attacks, kidnapping) against community leaders and politicians in each of the approximately 1100 municipalities, along with details data and reports. In 2016, MOE published a combined electoral risk map that showed the results of the 2016 Colombian peace agreement referendum together with electoral risks from 1996 to 2011 related to both territorial control of armed opposition groups and to risks from former paramilitary groups that converted to banditry.

MOE cooperates in research projects related to election monitoring and election-related violence, including a study in 2020 on the effectiveness of social media advertising of electoral monitoring activities and a 2020 study together with the Netherlands Institute for Multiparty Democracy on electoral violence against community and political leaders during the COVID-19 pandemic.

On 3 August 2024, MOE published an analysis of the all the 2024 Venezuelan presidential election results publicly available at the time, finding that the disaggregated data provided by the opposition was self-consistent, and called for the Venezuelan National Electoral Council to publish the polling station tally sheets and audit the full chain of transmission of information.

== Pilas con el Voto ==
Prior to the 2011 Colombian regional and municipal elections, MOE launched a website "Pilas con el Voto" (vote watch) for crowdsourcing the tasks of giving advice on poll observation techniques, gathering data on reports of irregularities, and for publishing its maps and other analyses of the data. MOE encourages the use of the data for filing complaints to authorities such as prosecutors and the Colombian ombudsman. MOE staff members have an "institutional interface" with several of these governmental agencies. The website allows both anonymous and non-anonymous reporting. MOE maintains relations with regional and national Colombian media. The effectiveness of the Pilas con el Voto website led to the Colombian authorities to created their own election fraud reporting website, "URIEL". In 2014 and 2015, 80% to 90% of the reports received by URIEL were provided by MOE.

== See also ==
- Coalition of Domestic Election Observers
- Golos (election monitor)
