= María del Socorro Bustamante =

Colombian politician

María del Socorro Bustamante (June 24, 1955 – March 21, 2015) was a Colombian politician and physiotherapist who served as a councilor on the Cartagena City Council from 2000 to 2011. Initially, she started her career in healthcare by specializing in respiratory physiotherapy and intensive care, eventually serving as the head of the therapy department at the Nuevo Hospital Bocagrande. She later transitioned into politics by becoming a member of the Junior Chamber of Cartagena and serving as the mayor of Locality 1 in 1994. During her subsequent career, she served on the Cartagena City Council representing the People's Will Movement and held the position of council president in 2002. She resigned in 2011 to run for Mayor of Cartagena under the "For a Social Cartagena" party. Bustamante died in 2015 following severe complications from gastric bypass surgery

== Early life and education ==
Bustamante was born on June 24, 1955 in Cartagena, Bolívar.Her father worked as a dressmaker and her mother was a nail technician. She attended Colegio Eucarístico De Santa Teresa in Manga. After graduating from high school, she left Cartagena to continue her studies at the Universidad del Rosario in Bogotá, majoring in physiotherapy. During her studies, she received a scholarship to specialize in Respiratory Physiotherapy, Intensive Care , Health Management at University of Miami. She worked as head of the therapy department at the Nuevo Hospital Bocagrande and as a therapist for several hospitals and companies, such as Bonsalud, Cafesalud, Medisalud, and Colsanitas.

== Career ==
She began her political career as a member of the Junior Chamber of Cartagena and founder of Calamarí group. She also became representative of user interests on the board of directors for EE.PP.MM, the now-defunct Municipal Public Companies. In 1994, she was elected as mayor for locality 1. Then she ran for and was elected as a councilor on the Cartagena City Council from 2000 to 2011 where she held position the position of president of the council in 2002 under the People's Will Movement party. She resigned in 2011 to run for Mayor of Cartagena in the 2011 Colombian regional and municipal elections for theof For a Social Cartagena party.

== Death ==
On March 21, 2015, Bustamante passed away after suffering severe complications from gastric bypass surgery , which led to pneumonia and septic shock. She was initially treated for a week at the Nuevo Hospital Bocagrande before being transferred on February 27 to the San Vicente de Paúl Hospital in Rionegro for a liver transplantation. However, she suffered cardiac arrest and died before the transplant could take place. She lay in state during a public viewing at the Cartagena City Council, followed by a funeral mass at the Bocagrande Church and burial at the Jardines de Cartagena cemetery.
