= 2019 Colombian regional and municipal elections =

| ← 2015 | October 27, 2019 | 2023 → |

The 2019 Colombian regional and municipal elections were held on Sunday, 27 October 2019 in Colombia to elect the governors of the 32 departments, deputies to departmental assemblies, mayors of 1,102 municipalities, municipal councillors and aldermen on local administrative boards (Juntas Administrativas Locales, JAL).

== Electoral systems ==
The governors of Colombia's 32 departments are elected to a single four-year term by first-past-the-post. The governor is considered the head of the local administration, but also the president's agent in the department to maintain public order and implement national policies. Each department has a departmental assembly (asamblea departamental), with between 11 and 31 members depending on the department's population, whose members are elected using the same electoral system as that used for congressional elections - namely, optional open party-list proportional representation with the threshold being equal to half of the electoral quotient. Political parties choose whether their lists are 'preferential' (open) or 'non-preferential' (closed). Candidates on the party's open list are reordered based on the results, although votes cast only for the party rather than a candidate only count for purposes of seat allocation between parties.

The mayors of Colombia's 1,102 municipalities are elected to a single four-year term by first-past-the-post. The mayor is the head of the local administrative and the legal representative of the municipality. Each municipality has a municipal council (consejo municipal) made up of 7 to 21 members, depending on the municipality's population. Municipal councillors are elected using the same electoral system used for departmental assemblies.

Municipalities may further subdivide themselves into comunas (in urban areas) and corregimientos municipales (in rural areas) which are administered by a local administrative board (Juntas Administrativas Locales, JAL).

Bogotá, the capital, has a special constitutional status as Capital District. Despite being the capital of Cundinamarca department, the government of Cundinamarca has no authority over Bogotá's territory and the city's inhabitants do not vote for the governor of Cundinamarca. While Bogotá is counted as a municipality, it has the powers of both departments and municipalities. The capital is administered by a directly elected Superior Mayor (Alcalde mayor) and has a 45-member council, both serving four-year terms. Bogotá is subdivided into 20 localities (localidades) each with their own JAL of at least 7 members and a local mayor appointed by the superior mayor from a list submitted by the JAL.

Mayors and governors may not serve consecutive terms, but may be reelected to non-consecutive terms. Members of assemblies, councils and local administrative boards have no term limits.

== Elections for governor ==
=== Atlántico ===
- Population: 1,934,188 (2019 est.)
- Incumbent Governor: Elsa Noguera

=== Candidates ===
- Carlos Julio Dennis
- Diana Macias
- Elsa Noguera
- Rodney Castro
- Nicolas Petro

=== Results ===
| Candidate | Party | Votes | % |
|---|---|---|---|
| Elsa Noguera | La Clave es la Gente–Radical Change–Conservative | 687,101 | 73.20 |
| Nicolas Petro | Colombia Humana Atlántico-Humane Colombia | 191,302 | 20.38 |
| Carlos Julio Dennis | Colombia Justa Libres | 33,628 | 3.58 |
| Diana Macias | ISA | 16,900 | 1.80 |
| Ricardo Arias Mora | Colombia Renaciente | 9,738 | 1.04 |
| Blank votes | | | |
| Total | | 938,669 | 100.00 |
| Valid votes | | 938,669 | 91.08 |
| Invalid votes | | 91,910 | 8.92 |
| Total votes | | 1,030,579 | 100.00 |
| Registered voters/turnout | | 1,030,579 | 100.00 |

=== Bolívar ===
- Population: 1,015,551
- Incumbent Governor: Vicente Blel Scaff

=== Candidates ===
- Hernando Padui
- Horacio Correa
- Luis Daniel Vargas
- Vicente Blel Scaff

=== Results ===
==== Results ====
| Candidate | Party | Votes | % |
|---|---|---|---|
| Vicente Blel Scaff | Conservative-Liberal-Party of the U-Democratic Center | 384,171 | 61.79 |
| Hernando Padaui | Radical Change | 171,742 | 27.62 |
| Luis Daniel Vargas | Colombia Renaciente | 34,767 | 5.59 |
| Horacio Correa | Bolívar Alternative | 31,080 | 5.00 |
| Blank votes | | | |
| Total | | 621,760 | 100.00 |
| Valid votes | | 621,760 | 75.72 |
| Invalid votes | | 199,359 | 24.28 |
| Total votes | | 821,119 | 100.00 |
| Registered voters/turnout | | 821,119 | 100.00 |

=== Cesar ===
- Population:
- Incumbent Governor:

=== Candidates ===
- Luis Alberto Monsalvo
- Claudia Zuleta
- Kaleb Villalobos Brochel
- Hugo Vásquez
- Jaime Araújo

=== Results ===
==== Results ====
| Candidate | Party | Votes | % |
|---|---|---|---|
| Luis Alberto Monsalvo | Radical Change-Liberal-Party of the U | 279,414 | 63.00 |
| Claudia Zuleta | Democratic Center | 98,250 | 22.15 |
| Luis Daniel Vargas | Colombia Renaciente | 34,767 | 7.84 |
| Horacio Correa | Bolívar Alternative | 31,080 | 7.01 |
| Blank votes | | | |
| Total | | 443,511 | 100.00 |
| Valid votes | | 443,511 | 68.99 |
| Invalid votes | | 199,359 | 31.01 |
| Total votes | | 642,870 | 100.00 |
| Registered voters/turnout | | 821,119 | 78.29 |
