= Election monitoring =

Observation of an election by independent parties

Internationally observed elections

Internationally observed elections by Western monitors

Election monitoring involves the observation of an election by one or more independent parties, typically from another country or from a non-governmental organization (NGO). The monitoring parties aim primarily to assess the conduct of an election process on the basis of national legislation and of international election standards. There are national and international election observers.

Monitors do not directly prevent electoral fraud, but rather record and report instances of suspicious practices. The monitoring may serve to disincentivize, prevent or minimize practices that undermine election quality, as well as election-related violence. Election observation increasingly looks at the entire electoral process over a long period of time including postal voting, rather than at election-day proceedings only. The legitimacy of an election can be affected by the criticism of monitors, unless they are themselves seen as biased. A notable individual is often appointed honorary leader of a monitoring organization in an effort to enhance legitimacy of the monitoring process.

Scholars distinguish between election monitoring organizations in terms of quality. Some election monitors, often those with ties to authoritarian states, validate elections even when they are blatantly flawed.

== History ==
The first monitored election was that of an 1857 plebiscite in Moldavia and Wallachia (current Romania) that was monitored by most of the major European powers. Election monitoring was uncommon until after World War II. During the 1960s, less than 10% of elections were monitored. Election observation activities have expanded significantly following the end of the Cold War, along with the development of international standards on the conduct of democratic elections and the process of monitoring elections by both international and domestic observing organizations. By the 2000s, about 80% of all elections were observed.

During the 2010s and early 2020s, there was an increased prevalence of low-quality election monitors who validated flawed elections. These election monitors tended to have ties to autocratic states and authoritarian regional organizations, such as Shanghai Cooperation Organization (SCO), Commonwealth of Independent States (CIS), Organization for Democracy and Economic Development (GUAM), and Southern African Development Community.

== Organizations ==
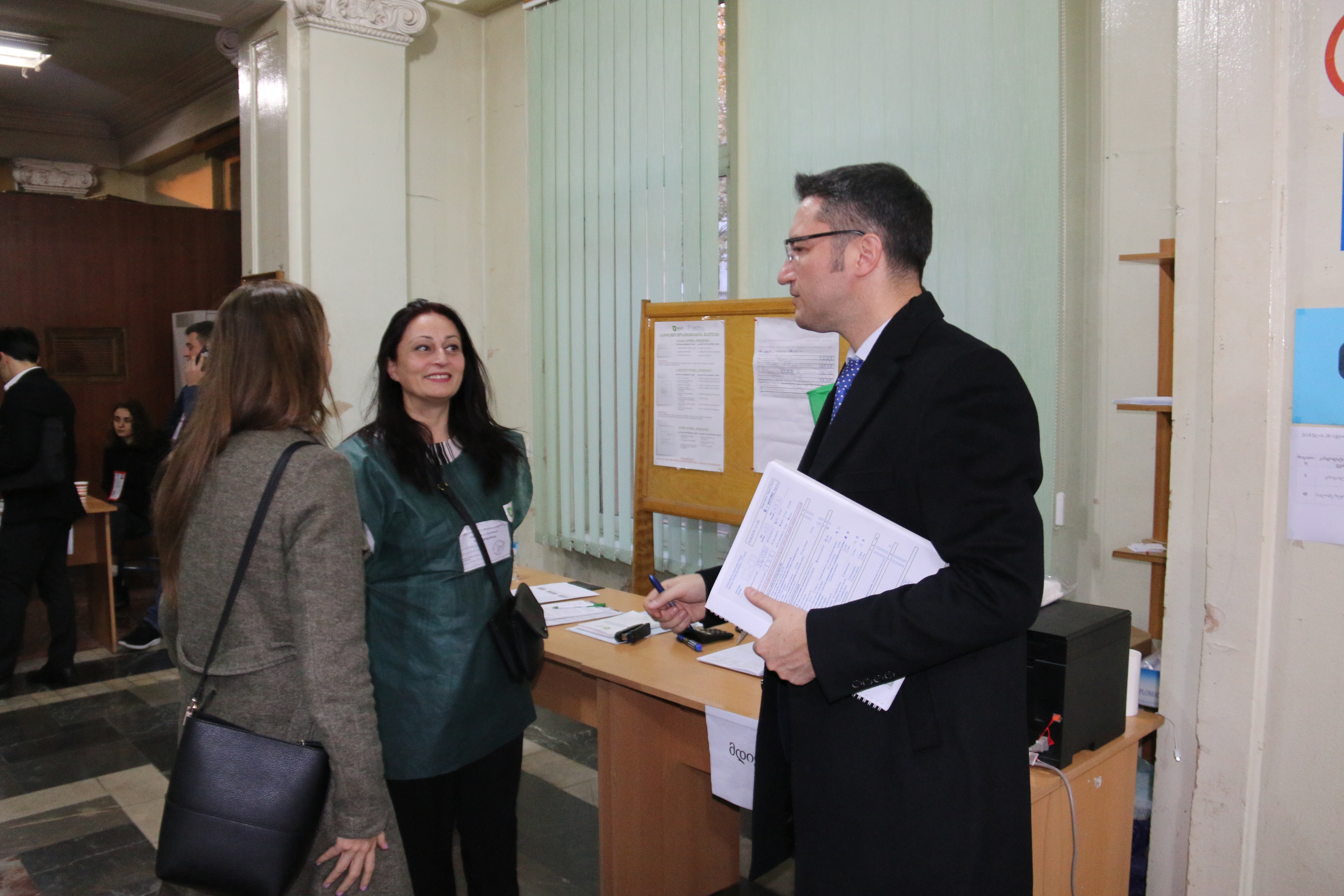
OSCE observers monitoring a polling station in Georgia in 2018.

International organizations such as the Organization of American States, the Organization for Security and Co-operation in Europe (OSCE), the European Union, the Commonwealth Secretariat, the Council of Europe, and the African Union regularly deploy monitoring teams. The United Nations no longer provides monitoring services; instead, it focuses on electoral assistance. Individual governments also participate in monitoring efforts, generally under the umbrella of an international organization. These national efforts are normally managed by the local electoral commission. A wide array of NGOs also participate in monitoring efforts. The Carter Center, for example, played a key role—with the United Nations Electoral Assistance Division and the National Democratic Institute—in building consensus on a common set of international principles for election observation.

International observation is complemented in many countries by domestic observer groups.

A 2024 study categorized election monitoring organizations in terms of their quality. Of the 20 most frequent election monitoring organizations, these were ranked as high-quality:

- OSCE/ODIHR
- European Union
- European Union Parliament
- Parliamentary Assembly of the Council of Europe
- OSCE Parliamentary Assembly
- Organization of American States
- Carter Center
- The Commonwealth
- National Democratic Institute
- Electoral Institute for Sustainable Democracy in Africa
- International Republican Institute

These were ranked middle quality:

- African Union
- Inter-American Union of Electoral Bodies
- International Organization of the Francophonie
- Economic Community of West African States
- Arab League

These were ranked low-quality:

- Commonwealth of Independent States
- Southern African Development Community
- The Electoral Commissions Forum of SADC Countries
- Shanghai Cooperation Organisation
- Organization of Islamic Cooperation

== International election monitoring ==
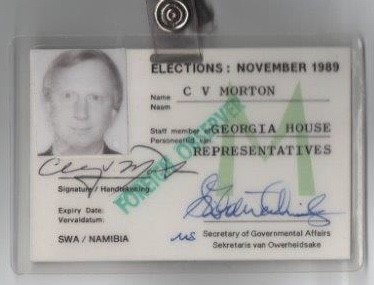
International Election Observer identification badge issued during the 1989 Namibian election

Standard international election observation missions, as deployed by, for example, the European Commission or the OSCE Office for Democratic Institutions and Human Rights (ODIHR), monitor the entire electoral process. Election experts and long-term observers begin their work weeks before the actual election day, looking at candidate registration, the legal framework, the media situation, the work of the election administration, and the campaign environment. On election day, short-term observers monitor the opening of polling stations, the vote cast, and the counting and tabulation of results. After election day, observers remain in the country for another few weeks to monitor how possible election-related shortcomings and complaints are dealt with by the election administration and the judiciary. The findings of the observers are made public in reports issued after election day.

A 2026 study found that the presence of election monitors lead to greater reporting of electoral violence, showing that election monitors uncovered information of problematic election conduct.

=== Long-term observers ===
Most observation missions send a small number of long-term monitors (known as LTOs) for a period of six to eight weeks. A larger number of short-term observers (known as STOs) then join the mission for the final week of the campaign. STOs provide mostly quantitative observation of polling station and count procedures, with LTOs supplying qualitative analysis and contextual information about the wider political situation.

== Domestic election monitoring ==
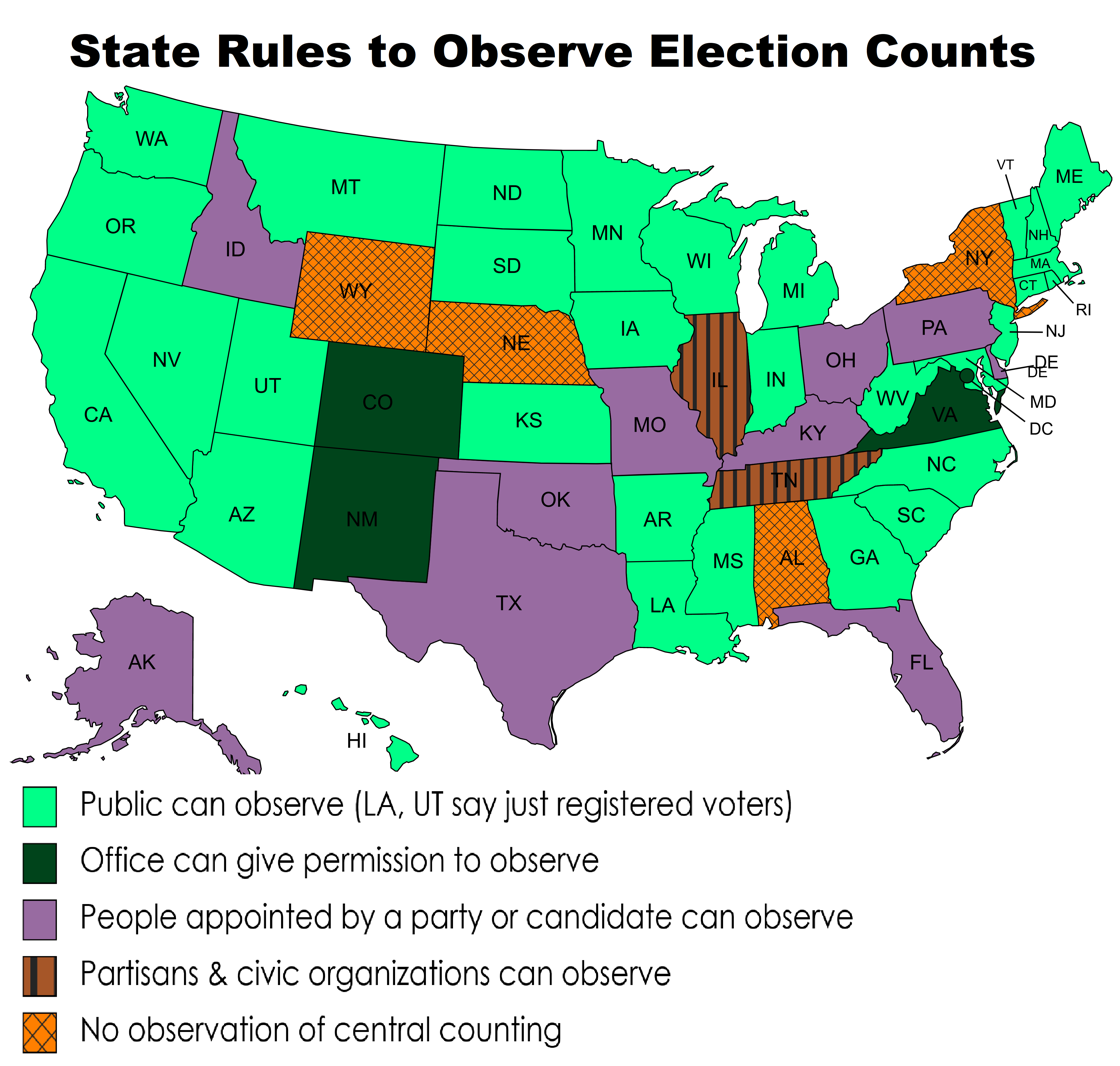
Election observers

In addition to international organizations monitoring elections, citizen organizations—or coalitions of organizations—also monitor elections in their own country. Examples include Electoral Observation Mission in Colombia, Golos in Russia, and the Coalition of Domestic Election Observers in Ghana.

The most common type of domestic election monitoring comes by way of party poll-watchers, who are partisan individuals that are looking out for the interests of their party. Election day activities of partisan observation groups often included scrutinizing the accreditation, voting, counting, and tabulations processes at polling units throughout election day.

There are also numerous domestic nonpartisan observer groups in many countries.

Free and Fair Election Network (FAFEN) in Pakistan is a coalition of 42 national civil society organizations working together to promote fair elections in Pakistan.

Each jurisdiction may have different rules about who may observe. Rules vary by state in the United States.

== Local and regional election monitoring ==
Most international observer organizations have a mandate to observe parliamentary elections; some organizations, such as the Organization for Security and Co-operation in Europe (OSCE), also monitor local elections and referendums. On the other hand, the Congress of the Council of Europe, in cooperation with the Venice Commission, is specifically mandated to monitor local and regional elections and is unique in this regard. Since 1990, over 50 election processes have been observed by the Congress.

The Congress Strategy on election observation is based on three lines of action:

- Election monitoring by the Congress should contribute to setting up institutional frameworks which comply with the principles underlying local democracy as laid down in the European Charter of Local Self-Government. In light of this, the Congress puts the accent on post-election dialogue as part of the Congress' work on monitoring of local and regional democracy. The aim is to improve the follow-up given to the recommendations adopted by the Congress following election observation missions and to facilitate their implementation.
- Election monitoring by the Congress should contribute to promoting awareness about the significance of democracy at the local and regional level.
- Making full use of the unique role of the Congress in the field of election observation, efforts are also made to increase the operational capability of election observation missions.

== See also ==
- CIS-EMO
- Organization for Security and Co-operation in Europe (OSCE)
- Eurasian Observatory for Democracy and Elections
- Congress of the Council of Europe
- National Democratic Institute for International Affairs
- International Republican Institute
- Uchaguzi
- Scrutineer

== Sources ==
- e-voting.cc: Observing Threats to Voter’s Anonymity: Election Observation of Electronic Voting
- Congress of the Council of Europe
- EU: Handbook for European Union Election Observation Missions
- OSCE: Election Observation Handbook
- OSCE: Handbook for Long Term Election Observers
- UN: Declaration of Principles for International Election Observation
- Guidelines on an internationally recognised status of election observers Venice Commission, 2009
