= Adolfo Mejía Navarro =

Colombian musician and composer

- Born: 5 February 1905; Sincé, Colombia
- Died: 6 July 1973 (aged 68) Cartagena, Colombia

Adolfo Mejía Navarro (Note: In this Spanish name, the first or paternal surname is Mejía and the second or maternal family name is Navarro.) (1905–1973) was a Colombian musician and composer. He lived and worked in Cartagena and Bogotá and spent time in New York and several European countries. His 1938 suite "Pequeña Suite para Orquesta" is notable for its inclusion of cumbia in the final movement.

== Biography ==
=== Early life and education ===
Mejía was born on 5 February 1905 in Sincé, in the Colombian department of Sucre, to Adolfo Mejía and Francisca Navarro. His father was a guitarist and notable singer.

In 1916 Mejía moved to Cartagena, where he studied at the Normal de Institutores and sang in the choir of the San Pedro Claver church. Around this time he wrote his first composition, a piano piece called "Primicias". He obtained a bachelor's degree in philosophy and letters from the University of Cartagena.

=== Music career ===
In 1923 Mejía enrolled at the Instituto Musical de Cartagena, where he studied under Juan de Sanctis and Eusebio Celio Fernández. Concurrently he was a member of the Estudiantina Revollo, the Orquesta Eureka, and the Jazz Band Lorduy, and was composing in several traditional Colombian styles including fandango, chandé, bambuco, and pasillo.

Mejía moved to New York in 1930, (Note: According to another source, he moved in 1927.) where he formed the Trío Albéniz with Terig Tucci on mandolin and Antonio Francés on lute. The Trío Albéniz recorded albums for Columbia Records and RCA Victor, and toured various cities around New York. In 1933 Mejía returned to Colombia, and moved to Bogotá. There he started working as a librarian for the National Symphony Orchestra, and played piano on the radio station Ecos del Tequendama. He also formed a guitar trio, and enrolled at the National Conservatory of Music, where he studied under Gustavo Escobar Larrazábal, Jesús Bermúdez Silva, and Andrés Pardo Tovar.

In 1938 a composition of Mejía's called "Pequeña Suite para Orquesta" won the Premio Ezequiel Bernal. Mejía used the prize winnings to move to Paris in 1939, where he enrolled in the École Normale de Musique and was taught by Nadia Bonneville, Nadia Boulanger, and Charles Koechlin, and influenced by the work of Claude Debussy and Maurice Ravel. He left Paris in 1940 due to the Nazi occupation and travelled via Italy to Brazil, following which he spent some time in New York and Argentina before returning to Colombia.

Alongside musician Espinosa Grau, Mejía was involved in the formation of the Sociedad Pro-Arte Musical in Colombia in 1945, an organisation that oversaw music festivals in Cartagena. In 1950 he travelled in Spain, France, and Italy, and then lived briefly in New York before returning to Colombia, where in 1954–1957 he directed the orchestra of the Instituto Musical de Cartagena, where he had studied as a young man. He taught music at several schools on the Caribbean coast and was also conductor of the Navy Band for several years.

=== Personal life and death ===
Mejía was friends with Lucho Bermúdez. He died on 6 July 1973 in Cartagena.

== Musical style and compositions ==
One of Mejía's best-known compositions is the suite "Pequeña Suite para Orquesta", with which he won the Premio Ezequiel Bernal in 1938. It has three movements: the first is a bambuco, and unusually the last is a cumbia. Radio Nacional de Colombia wrote that the piece "incorporated music from the Colombian Caribbean into an academic piece for the first time", which it counted as one of Mejías "greatest achievements".

Mejía's other notable compositions include "Salida de Don Quijote", "Bachianas", "América", "Cartagena", "Himno de Cartagena", "Himno de la Marina", "Pincho", "Trini", "Manopili", "El Burrito" and "Luminosidad de Aguas".
