= Departmental Assembly of Córdoba =

Legislative branch of the state government of Córdoba

Departmental Assembly of Córdoba Asamblea Departamental de Córdoba

Type
- Type: Unicameral

Leadership
- President: Said Bittar, (C) since January 1, 2020
- First Vice President: José Peñate Uparela, (L) since January 1, 2020
- Second Vice President: Darío Mendoza, (CR) since January 1, 2020

Structure
- Seats: 13 voting members: 13 Deputies
- Length of term: 4 years

Elections
- Next Departmental Assembly of Córdoba election: October 2023
- Redistricting: Legislative control

Motto
- Omnia per ipsum facta sunt

Meeting place
- Monteria

Website
- https://asamblea-cordoba.gov.co/diputados/

The Departmental Assembly of Córdoba is a deliberative assembly of the departmental legislature of the department of Córdoba, Colombia. This entity is made up of 13 deputies, who represent the autonomous legislative power at the regional level. They are elected by popular vote and serve for a period of 4 years and serve as mediators between the entire population of the department. The main office is located at Carrera 4 # 26 27 in the city of Monteria.

It is protected by the Constitution of Colombia and enjoys autonomy and budget. As a territorial entity, it issues orders and decrees that are mandatory.

== See also ==
- Governor of Córdoba
- List of Colombian Department Assemblies
- Legislative Branch of Colombia
