= Guillermo González (politician) =

Colombian politician (1941–2021)

Governor of Cauca
- In office 1 January 2007 – 31 December 2010
- Preceded by: Juan José Chaux
- Succeeded by: Temitocles Ortega

Minister of National Defense
- In office 2 February 1997 – 30 March 1997
- President: Ernesto Samper
- Preceded by: Juan Carlos Esguerra
- Succeeded by: Gilberto Echeverri Mejía

Senator of Colombia
- In office 7 August 1990 – 4 June 1991

Member of the Chamber of Representatives
- In office 7 August 1986 – 7 August 1990
- Constituency: Cauca

Minister Labour and Social Security
- In office 1983–1984
- President: Belisario Betancur
- Preceded by: Jaime Pinzón López
- Succeeded by: Germán Bula Escobar

Personal details
- Born: Gilberto Alberto González Mosquera; 12 February 1941 Popayán, Cauca, Colombia
- Died: 5 August 2021 (aged 80) Popayán, Cauca, Colombia
- Party: Liberal
- Spouse: María Teresa Ayerbe
- Children: 4
- Education: University of Cauca; Purdue University
- Profession: Civil engineer, diplomat, politician

Guillermo Alberto González Mosquera (12 February 1941 – 5 August 2021) was a Colombian politician who served as a Minister, Governor of Cauca, Senator and Mayor of Popayán.
