= Elías Bechara Zainúm =

Colombian educator (1920–2013)

Rector of the University of Córdoba
- In office March 15, 1964 – March 19, 1972

Personal details
- Born: Elías Bechara Zainúm; December 10, 1920 Lorica, Córdoba, Colombia
- Died: August 9, 2013 (aged 92) Montería, Córdoba, Colombia
- Spouse: Saray Castilla
- Education: University of Cartagena College of Chemist-bacteriologis

Elías Bechara Zainúm (December 10, 1920 – August 9, 2013) was a Colombian educator, philanthropist and chemist-bacteriologist, founder of the University of Córdoba and the Sinú University, in Colombia.

== Early life ==
Zainúm was the son of Syrian-Lebanese migrants who arrived in Colombia towards the end of the 19th century and the beginning of the 20th century, settling in Lorica, Córdoba. As a child, Zainúm was a great reader and always wanted to help and protect his classmates. Zainúm moved to Cartagena for high school.

== University of Sinú ==
In 1974 he founded the Higher Educational Corporation of Córdoba.
