= Bernardo Elías =

Colombian politician (born 1976)

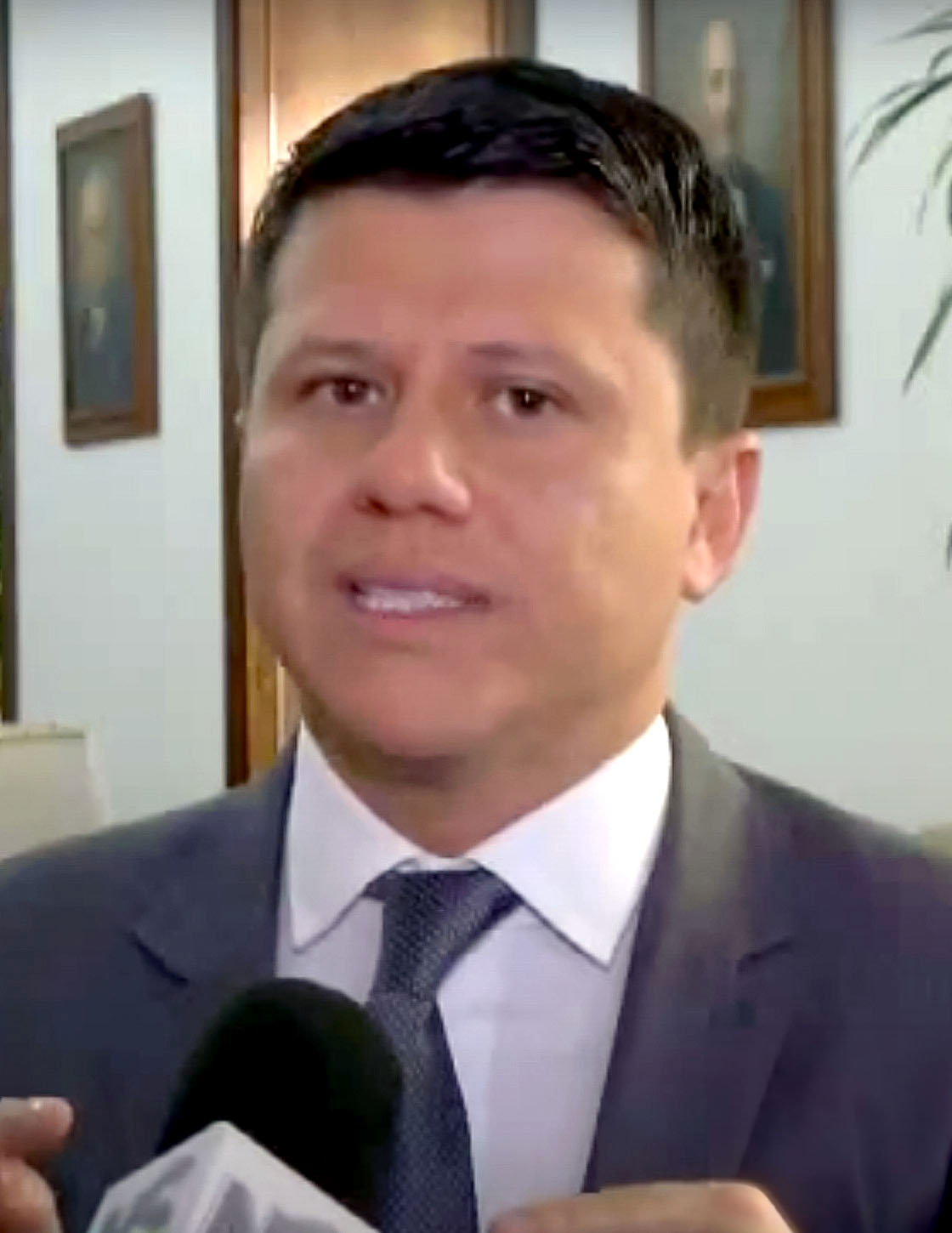
- Elías in 2016

Senator of Colombia
- In office July 20, 2010 – September 21, 2017

Member of the Chamber of Representatives
- In office July 20, 2006 – July 20, 2010
- Constituency: Córdoba

Personal details
- Born: Bernardo Miguel Elías Vidal; November 7, 1976 (age 49) Sahagún, Córdoba, Colombia
- Party: Union Party for the People (2006-present)
- Education: La Salle University
- Website: Chamber website

Bernardo Miguel Elías Vidal (born November 7, 1976) is a Colombian civil engineer and politician and former member of the Union Party for the People.

Elías has served as a Colombian Congressman, serving as a member of the Chamber of Representatives from 2006 to 2010, representing the department of Córdoba and most recently as Senator of Colombia from 2010 until 2017, when he would lose his position in the Senate after being found responsible by the Supreme Court of Justice of Colombia for having received 17.3 billion pesos in bribes from the Brazilian multinational Odebretch.

== Personal life ==
Bernardo Miguel Elías Vidal was born on November 7, 1976, in Sahagún, Córdoba to Bernardo Elías Sr. and Carmina Vidal, growing up in a conservative upper-class home, later in 1999 he graduated as a civil engineer from the La Salle University in Bogotá and then he would complete a specialization in Construction Management at the Pontificia Universidad Javeriana that would end in 2004.
