= International election standards =

International election standards are a set of principles and implementation guidelines for elections which have basis in the public international human rights law instruments. Sources of these standards are international (universal and regional) treaties, international customary law, political commitments, and internationally agreed principles of good practice adopted by governmental and non-governmental organisations.

== International treaty standards ==
International treaty standards are agreements made by states voluntarily. Treaty monitoring body is responsible for monitoring the compliance of these standards. The most important treaty in setting the fundamental standards in elections is considered to be the International Covenant on Civil and Political Rights.
