= Valle de San Juan =

Coordinates: 4°12′N 75°07′W

- Municipality and town
- Flag Seal

- Location of the municipality and town of Valle de San Juan in the Tolima Department of Colombia.
- Country: Colombia
- Department: Tolima Department

Area
  - Municipality and town: 198 km^{2} (76 sq mi)
  - Urban: 1 km^{2} (0.39 sq mi)
- Elevation: 600 m (2,000 ft)

Population (2008)
  - Municipality and town: 6,178
  - Density: 31.2/km^{2} (80.8/sq mi)
  - Urban: 2,470
- Time zone: UTC-5 (Colombia Standard Time)
- Website: http://valledesanjuan-tolima.gov.co/index.shtml

Valle de San Juan is a municipality in the Tolima department of Colombia. The population of the municipality was 6,178 as of 2008.
