= List of governors of Córdoba (Colombian department) =

The list of the governors of the Colombian Department of Córdoba, the Congress of Colombia approved by Law 9 of December 17, 1951 which created the department of Córdoba and later sanctioned by the then acting president of Colombia Roberto Urdaneta, but only came into effect six months later.

According to the Colombian Constitution of 1991 the executive power for this region will be vested in a single individual elected by popular vote (starting from 1991, governors were previously appointed by the president of Colombia) and will be called Governor of the Córdoba. The position was officially established on August 23, 1952, however, Remberto Burgos Puche was appointed as the first Governor of Córdoba, being the president of the Organizational Committee of Córdoba.

== List ==
Conservative Liberal Unionist Independent
| № | Portrait | Governor | Term of office | Acting governor |
Designated Governor of Córdoba (1952–1991)
| 1 | | Manuel Antonio Buelvas | August 23, 1952 – October 7, 1953 | |
| 2 | | Miguel García Sánchez | October 8, 1953 – May 9, 1957 | |
| 3 | | Eusebio Cabrales | May 10, 1957 – January 17, 1958 | |
| 4 | | Eugenio Giraldo | January 18, 1958 – September 5, 1958 | |
| 5 | | José Jiménez Altamiranda | September 6, 1958 – July 14, 1960 | |
| 6 | | Remberto Burgos Puche | July 15, 1960 – October 6, 1962 | |
| 7 | | José Miguel Amín | October 6, 1962 – March 14, 1963 | |
| 8 | | Germán Bula | March 15, 1963 – March 4, 1963 | |
| 9 | | Ramón Berrocal Failach | March 4, 1963 – August 25, 1966 | |
| 10 | | Amaury García Burgos | August 26, 1966 – September 4, 1968 | |
| 11 | | Alfonso Ordosgoitia | September 5, 1968 – March 13, 1969 | |
| 28 | | Ramiro Sánchez Kerguelén | September 4, 1981 – August 26, 1982 | |
| 29 | | Julio César Zapateiro | August 27, 1982 – August 9, 1984 | |
| 30 | | Camilo Jiménez | August 10, 1984 – January 28, 1985 | |
| 31 | | Fernando Salas | January 19, 1985 – August 21, 1986 | |
| 32 | | Héctor Lorduy | August 22, 1986 – June 17, 1987 | |
| 33 | | José Gabriel Amím | June 18, 1987 – January 10, 1989 | Raúl Quintero Lyons (January 4, 1989–January 10, 1990) |
| 34 | | Fredy Sánchez Arteaga | January 11, 1991 – August 22, 1991 | |
| 35 | | Jorge Elías | August 23, 1990 – June 11, 1991 | Carlos Henao Gallo (June 12–July 30, 1991) |
| 36 | | Luciano Lepesqueur | July 30, 1991 – December 31, 1991 | |
Governor of Córdoba (1991–present)
| 37 | | Jorge Manzur | January 1, 1991 – December 31, 1994 | Javier Jiménez (January 20–October 10, 1994) |
| 38 | | Javier Jiménez | October 11, 1994 – December 31, 1994 | |
| 39 | | Carlos Buelvas | January 1, 1995 – December 31, 1997 | |
| 40 | | Ángel Villadiego | January 1, 1998 – December 31, 2000 | |
| 41 | | Jesús María López | January 1, 2001 – December 31, 2003 | |
| 42 | | Libardo José López | January 1, 2004 – January 12, 2006 | Jaime Torralvo (April 17–June 22, 2006) |
| 43 | | Jaime Torralvo | March 22, 2007 – January 1, 2008 | |
| 44 | | Marta Sáenz | January 1, 2008 – December 31, 2011 | Liliana Bittar (January 17–April 23, 2008) |
| 44 | | Marta Sáenz | January 1, 2008 – December 31, 2011 | Alonso Pío Fernández (April 23–May 15, 2008) |
| 45 | | Alejandro Lyons | January 1, 2012 – December 31, 2015 | |
| 46 | | Edwin Besaile | January 1, 2016 – December 31, 2019 | Sandra Patricia Devia (January 18, 2018–January 21, 2019) |
| 47 | | Orlando Benítez | January 1, 2020 - December 31, 2023 | |
| 48 | | Erasmo Zuleta | January 1, 2024 - present | |
