= Sincé =

Coordinates: 9°15′N 75°09′W

- Municipality and town
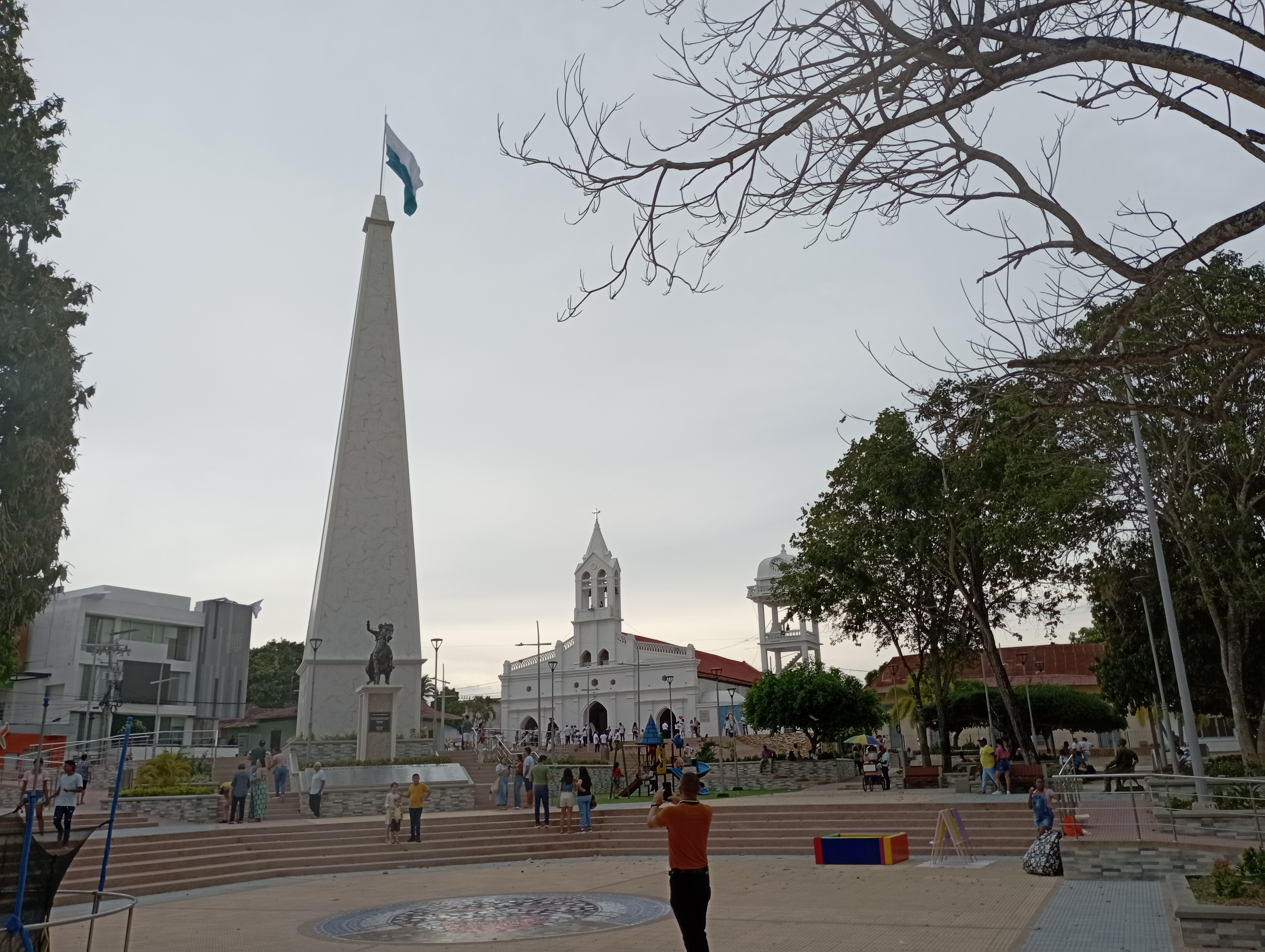
- View of the Parque Central in Sincé

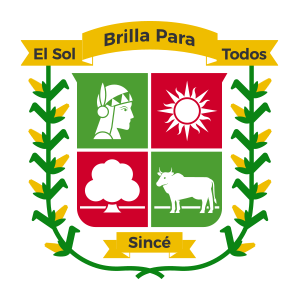
- Flag Coat of arms

- Location of the municipality and town of Sincé in the Sucre Department of Colombia.
- Country: Colombia
- Department: Sucre Department

Government
  - Mayor: Andrés Alfredo Aldana Padilla

Area
  - Municipality and town: 419 km^{2} (162 sq mi)
  - Urban: 3.03 km^{2} (1.17 sq mi)
- Elevation: 137 m (449 ft)

Population (2018 census)
  - Municipality and town: 30,773
  - Density: 73.4/km^{2} (190/sq mi)
  - Urban: 22,672
  - Urban density: 7,480/km^{2} (19,400/sq mi)
- Time zone: UTC-5 (Colombia Standard Time)

Sincé, also known as San Luis de Sincé, is a town and municipality located in the Department of Sucre, 28 km (15 mi) southeast of Sincelejo, in northern Colombia. It has an average Temperature of 26,5°C (80°F). Its main economic activities are agriculture, stockbreeding and commerce. It was founded November 10, 1775 by Antonio de Torre y Miranda. Sincé is home to "Hospital Local Nuestra Señora del Socorro" and a Municipal Photo Gallery.

== Celebrations and Events ==
The biggest local celebrations are held in honor of the Virgen del Socorro, the city's patron Saint, and celebrated in September. Other major celebrations include the Fiestas en Corralejas (Running of the Bulls) in January and La Semana de la Sinceanidad (Sincé Week), commemorating its founding in November.

== Notable people ==
Musician and composer Adolfo Mejía Navarro was born in Sincé.

== Gallery ==
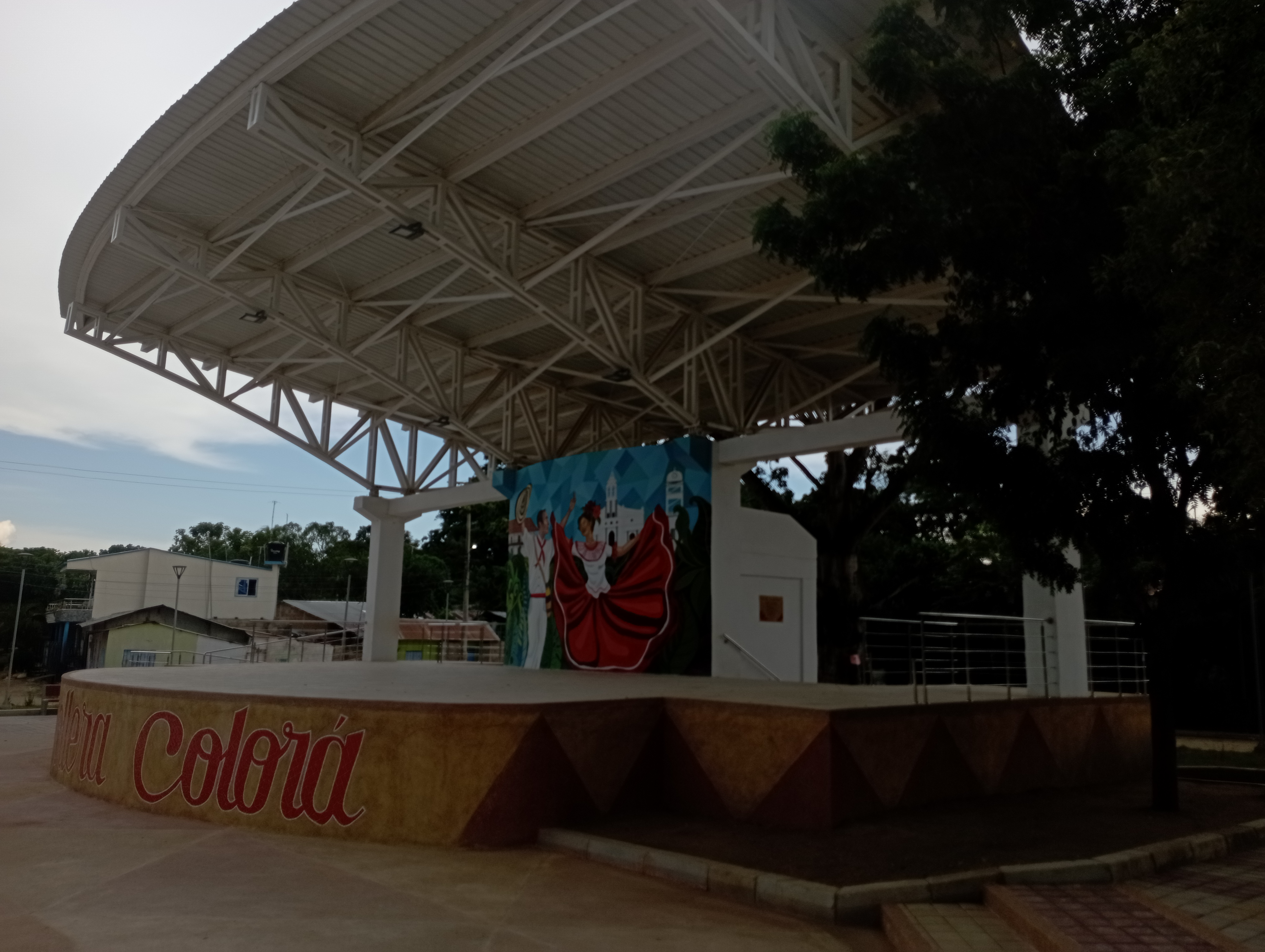
La Pollera Colora Cultural Park´s Platform. Since, Sucre, Colombia

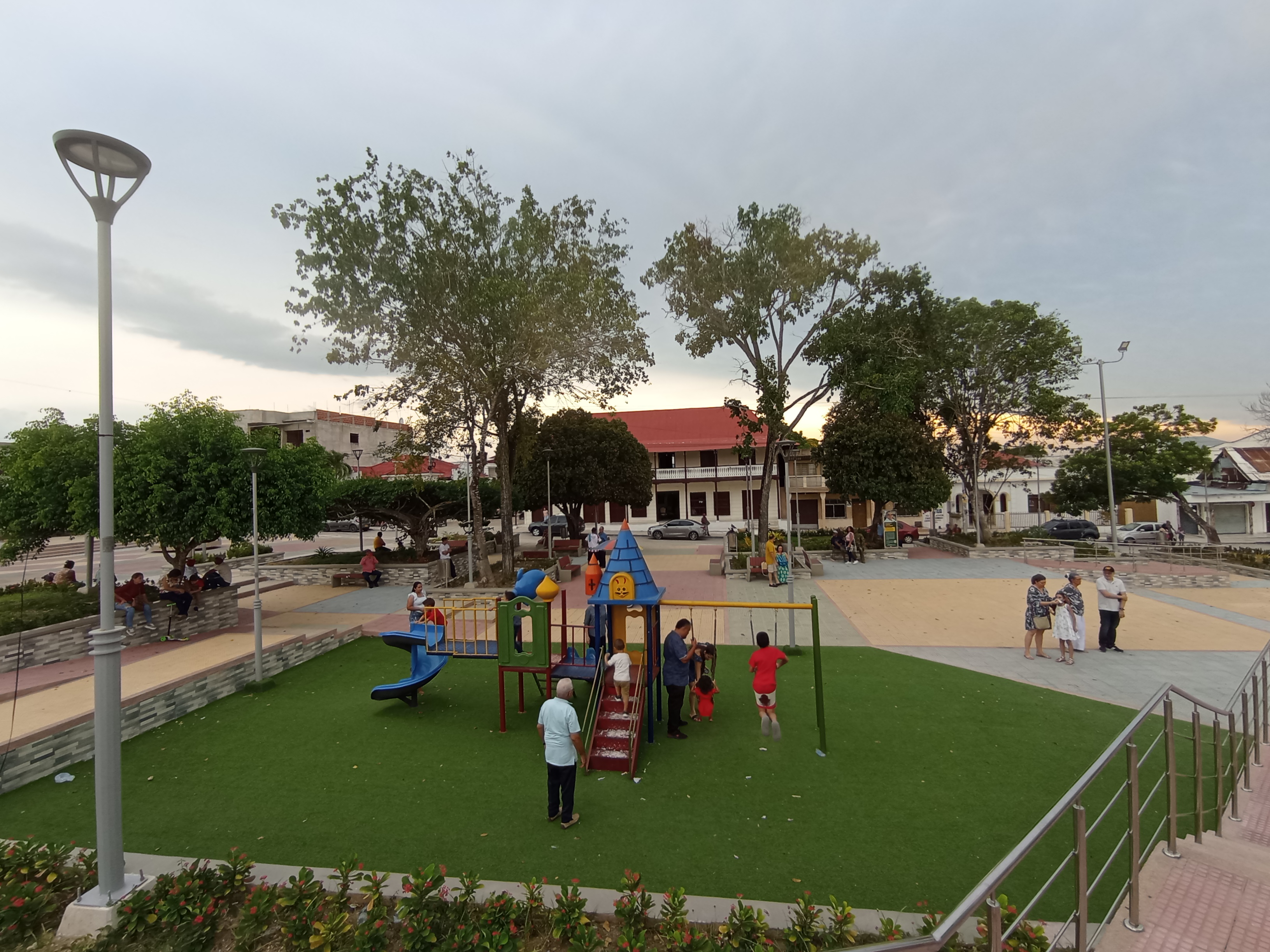
Sincé's Central Park. In the Background there are Houses with Traditional Architecture

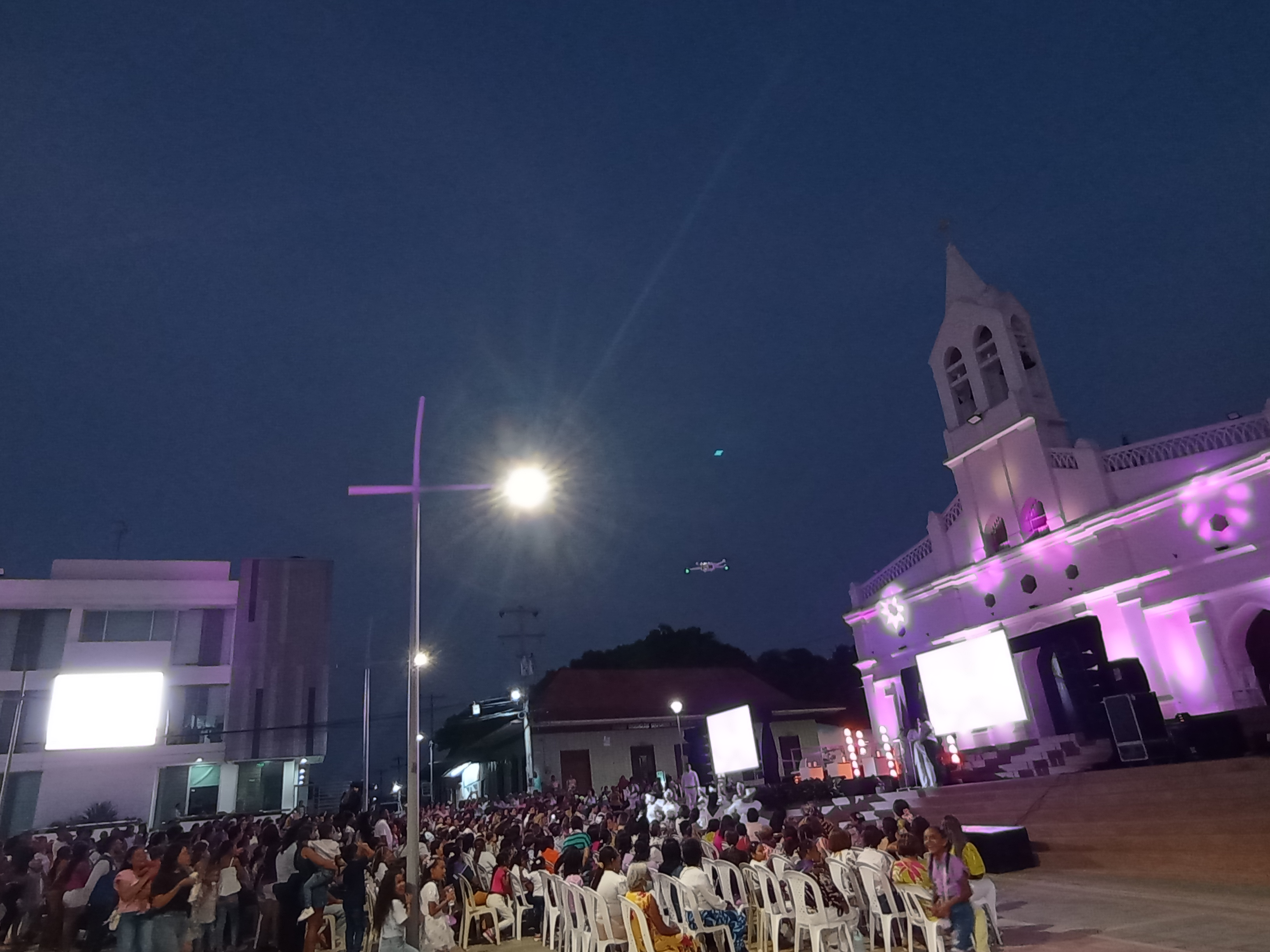
Sincé's Town Hall (Left) and Catholic Main Church (Right) Sucre, Colombia.
