= Valencia, Cordoba =

Valencia
- Municipality and town
- Flag

- Location of the municipality and town of Valencia in the Córdoba Department of Colombia

- Location in Colombia
- Coordinates: 8°12′N 76°13′W
- Country: Colombia
- Department: Córdoba Department

Area
  - Municipality and town: 914 km^{2} (353 sq mi)
- Elevation: 55 m (180 ft)

Population (2015)
  - Municipality and town: 42,971
  - Density: 47.0/km^{2} (122/sq mi)
  - Urban: 15,601
- Time zone: UTC-5 (Colombia Standard Time)
- Website: http://www.valencia-cordoba.gov.co/

Valencia is a municipality in Colombia, located in the department of Córdoba, in the northern region of the country. Founded in 1917, it became a municipality in 1931. It is an important logging, livestock, and agricultural center in the department.

== Toponymy ==
The name is in homage to Valencia, Spain. (Note: The Spanish language Wikipedia article about Valencia states that the name was inspired by the song "Valencia" by José Padilla. A source for this claim appears unavailable, and the claim may be folklore.) As was customary among Spanish settlers during the colonial era and beyond, they named new settlements after cities and other places in Spain.

== Geography ==
Valencia is located in the southern portion of the department of Córdoba, 90 kilometers from the departmental capital of Montería. It is approximately 15 kilometers from the municipality of Tierra Alta. The municipal seat is located near the Sinú River at 8°16' north latitude and 76°9' west longitude of the Greenwich meridian.

Approximately 15 kilometers from the city of Valencia is the Volcán de Lodo Predio Los Volcanes which is a mud volcano located in the Vereda El Polo in the municipality of Valencia, Córdoba. The volcano is recognized as an Alto Valor de Conservación (High Conservation Value) site by Reforestadora del Sinú. The volcano is a tourist attraction because of the purported health benefits of the mineral baths in the pools associated with this mud volcano.

=== Hydrography ===
Valencia is in a region with a flat and fertile landscape, which is heavily influenced by the Sinú River basin. The Sinú River is the primary hydrographic feature of the area, serving as an important waterway that flows northward through the department and into the Caribbean Sea. While Valencia itself is not directly on the coast, its location is part of the broader Caribbean hydrographic region. The city's surroundings are characterized by extensive plains and lowlands, which include significant wetlands and marshlands, such as those within the broader Depresión Momposina, which is a floodplain region. These bodies of water are important to the local economy, supporting agriculture and are a foundation for the region's diverse ecosystems.

=== Climate ===
Valencia has a tropical savanna climate, characterized by generally hot and humid weather throughout the year. Temperatures typically range from a low of 74°F (23°C) to a high of 93°F (34°C). The hottest period occurs from February to April, while the coolest temperatures are in July to early December.

The climate includes wet and dry seasons. The city receives the majority of its rainfall from late May to early December, with July being the wettest month. In contrast, the driest season is from December to May. Due to this climate, the sky is often overcast or partly cloudy year-round, contributing to a feeling of consistently high humidity.

== Municipal government ==
Valencia is governed by a municipal structure that is led by an alcalde (mayor) as its chief executive and a Concejo Municipal (Municipal Council) as its legislative body. The mayor is responsible for leading the administration and implementing policies for the entire municipality, while the council, composed of elected officials, is responsible for creating and approving local laws and the municipal budget. This dual structure ensures that both executive and legislative powers are in place to govern the urban center and its surrounding rural districts (corregimientos).

The urban center of Valencia consists of approximately 23 barrios (neighborhoods), each of which has its own Junta de Acción Comunal (Community Action Board). These boards are elected by residents to serve as a link between the neighborhood and the municipal government. They are not a separate form of government, but instead are a means of community participation, allowing citizens to advocate for local projects and services directly to the mayor and city council. Examples of Valencia's barrios are Alfonso López, Bijagual, and El Rosario.

The corregimientos surrounding Valencia are the rural districts that extend from the urban center, constituting the majority of the municipality's territory. These areas are primarily agricultural, characterized by plains and a landscape shaped by the Sinú River basin. The corregimientos are communities with a rich agrarian culture and local traditions. Some examples of these districts are Jaraguay, Las Nubes, and El Reposo. The municipal government of Valencia has direct administrative responsibility for its surrounding corregimientos. This includes duties such as providing essential public services, managing infrastructure projects, and overseeing development. The mayor is the chief executive for the entire territory, and a representative appointed by the mayor, known as a corregidor, is responsible for administering the corregimiento on behalf of the municipal government.

== History ==
In the early 20th century, a group of explorers departed from the city of Montería to the upper part of the Sinú River, navigating the river for access. The leaders of the explorers included Catalino Rulfo, Ambrosio Ibarra, and Daniel Berrio. During their exploration, they established settlements, and some of these became permanent. Valencia was among these, the name referring to the Spanish city of Valencia, which at the time was popularized in a song by Julio Pacheco.

== Demographics ==
Based on the 2015 population estimates for the municipality of Valencia, the total population was estimated to be 42,971 people. The population is split between the urban center and the surrounding rural areas, with the majority of residents living outside the town proper. Valencia proper had a population of 15,601 people. The much larger figure of 27,370 people resided in the surrounding rural areas of the municipality. The population is approximately 52% male.
