= Sahagún, Córdoba =

- Municipality and town
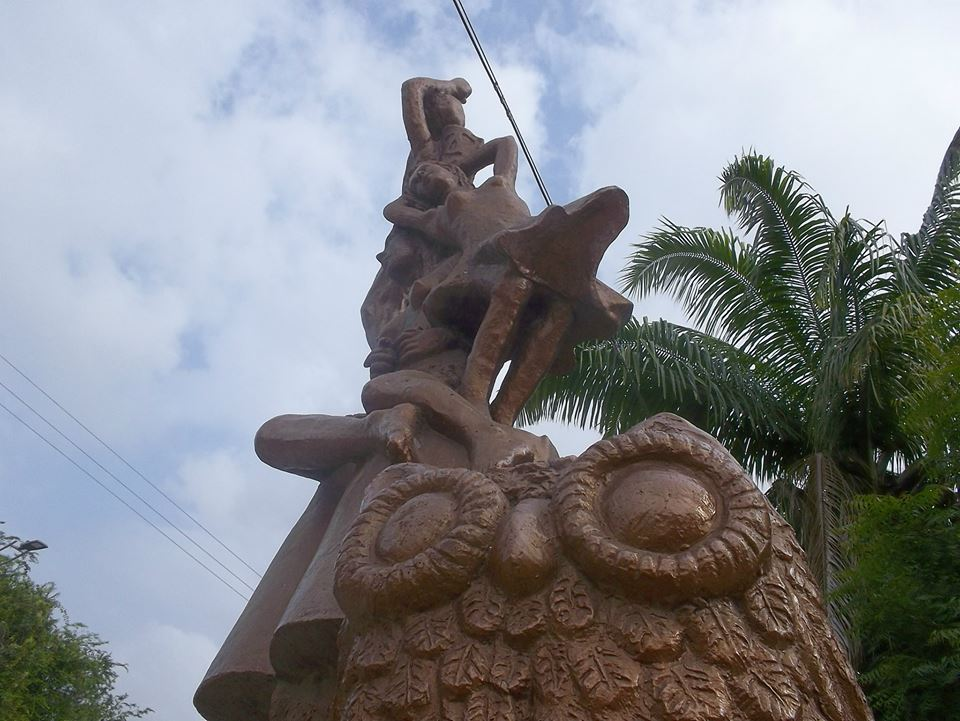

- Flag Coat of arms

- Location of the municipality and town of Sahagún, Córdoba in the Córdoba Department of Colombia.

- Location in Colombia
- Coordinates: 8°56′58″N 75°26′52″W
- Country: Colombia
- Department: Córdoba Department
- Established: Founded

Government
  - Mayor: Carlos Alberto Elias Hoyos

Area
  - Municipality and town: 964.8 km^{2} (372.5 sq mi)
  - Urban: 12.06 km^{2} (4.66 sq mi)
- Elevation: 71 m (233 ft)

Population (2020 est.)
  - Municipality and town: 110,233
  - Density: 114.3/km^{2} (295.9/sq mi)
  - Urban: 53,973
  - Urban density: 4,475/km^{2} (11,590/sq mi)
- Demonym: Sahagunese
- Time zone: UTC-5 (Colombia Standard Time)
- Area code: 57 + 4
- Website: Official website (in Spanish)

Sahagún (Spanish pronunciation: [saˈaɣun]) is a town and municipality located in the Córdoba Department, northern Colombia. As of 2020, the town population was estimated at 110,233.

== Climate ==
Climate data for Sahagún (Colomboy), elevation 125 m (410 ft), (1981–2010)
Month	Jan	Feb	Mar	Apr	May	Jun	Jul	Aug	Sep	Oct	Nov	Dec	Year
Mean daily maximum °C (°F)	33.1 (91.6)	33.9 (93.0)	34.1 (93.4)	33.1 (91.6)	31.8 (89.2)	31.6 (88.9)	31.8 (89.2)	31.8 (89.2)	31.2 (88.2)	31.1 (88.0)	31.1 (88.0)	31.7 (89.1)	32.2 (90.0)
Daily mean °C (°F)	27.4 (81.3)	27.6 (81.7)	27.8 (82.0)	27.6 (81.7)	27.2 (81.0)	27.3 (81.1)	27.2 (81.0)	27.2 (81.0)	26.8 (80.2)	26.7 (80.1)	26.9 (80.4)	27.1 (80.8)	27.2 (81.0)
Mean daily minimum °C (°F)	23.1 (73.6)	23.3 (73.9)	23.7 (74.7)	24.0 (75.2)	23.9 (75.0)	23.6 (74.5)	23.3 (73.9)	23.2 (73.8)	23.1 (73.6)	23.2 (73.8)	23.4 (74.1)	23.4 (74.1)	23.5 (74.3)
Average precipitation mm (inches)	14.2 (0.56)	26.3 (1.04)	50.9 (2.00)	123.9 (4.88)	186.2 (7.33)	175.5 (6.91)	186.4 (7.34)	228.9 (9.01)	188.9 (7.44)	168.4 (6.63)	129.6 (5.10)	45.5 (1.79)	1,524.8 (60.03)
Average precipitation days	2	3	5	11	15	13	15	17	16	14	11	5	123
Average relative humidity (%)	78	77	77	80	84	84	84	84	85	85	84	82	82
Source: Instituto de Hidrologia Meteorologia y Estudios Ambientales
