= Governor of Córdoba (Colombian department) =

Head of government of Córdoba

- Flag of Córdoba

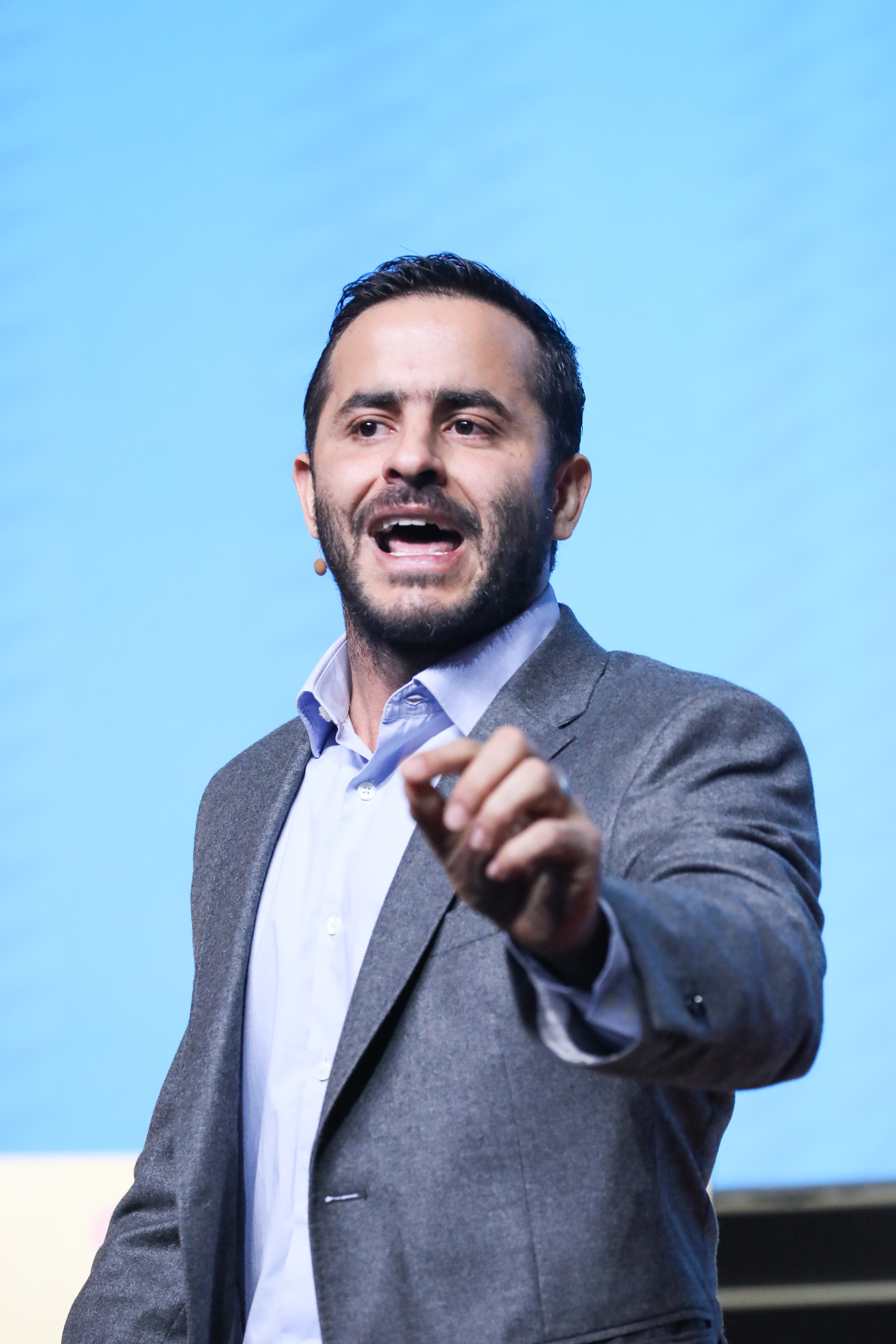
- Incumbent; Erasmo Zuleta since January 1, 2024
- Córdoba
- Style: Governor (informal); The Honorable (formal)
- Residence: None official
- Seat: Nain Palace
- Nominator: Political Parties
- Appointer: Popular vote
- Term length: Four years, renewable non-consecutively (Note: A governor can be re-elected for a second term four years after his last term.)
- Constituting instrument: Constitution of Colombia
- Formation: August 23, 1952
- Salary: 20,196,617 Colombian Peso/US$ 1,169,896 annually

Governor of Córdoba is the highest authority in Córdoba. The governor is responsible for enforcing the constitution and the laws established by the regional legislature. The governor is elected for a four-year term by the people of Córdoba through popular vote.

Unlike the president, the governor is not judged by a legislature; instead, the Office of the Inspector General is responsible for judging and removing him, either on its own initiative or at the initiative of the people. The governor does not have an official residence; however, his office is located in Nain Palace of Montería.

Erasmo Zuleta is the 48th governor of Córdoba. He was elected during the 2023 regional and municipal elections.

== History and constitutional convention ==
The position of governor in Córdoba appears for the first time in August 1952. Previously in June, the creation of Córdoba as a department had been made official, with Manuel Antonio Buelvas being appointed as the first governor of Córdoba. Although the governor was appointed directly by the president, the president had the power to appoint the mayors in the department at his discretion.

In 1991, the constitution gave the governor some powers, although it restricted the president's right to appoint governors and their right to appoint mayors, which was replaced by elections at the regional and municipal level.

=== Eligibility ===
The governor must be a citizen in good standing, at least 30 years old, and not have been suspended from holding public office. The governor may be re-elected, but not consecutively.

- be a natural-born citizen
- be a at least 30 years old

=== Incumbency ===
The governor is elected for a four-year term and is eligible for reelection for a second or even a third term, but not consecutively. However, traditionally, to date, no governor has sought a second term after leaving office.

=== Vacancies ===
Since the transition to a democratically elected position, the office has been permanently vacant on two occasions. When the governor is removed from office by the Office of the Inspector General, the constitution stipulates that the president will appoint an acting governor to complete the term.

=== Executive cabinet ===
The governor of Córdoba presides over the cabinet, which coordinates all the functions of the regional government. This cabinet is composed of the following members, all of whom are appointed by the governor at his discretion as heads of the executive departments.

- Secretary General
- Head of the Legal Office
- Secretary of Health
- Secretary of Planning
- Secretary of Economic and Business Development
- Budget Director
- Secretary of Finance
- Secretary of Infrastructure
- Head of Communications

== See also ==
- Departmental Assembly of Córdoba
