= Ricardo Londoño =

Colombian racing driver (1949–2009)

Ricardo Londoño Bridge
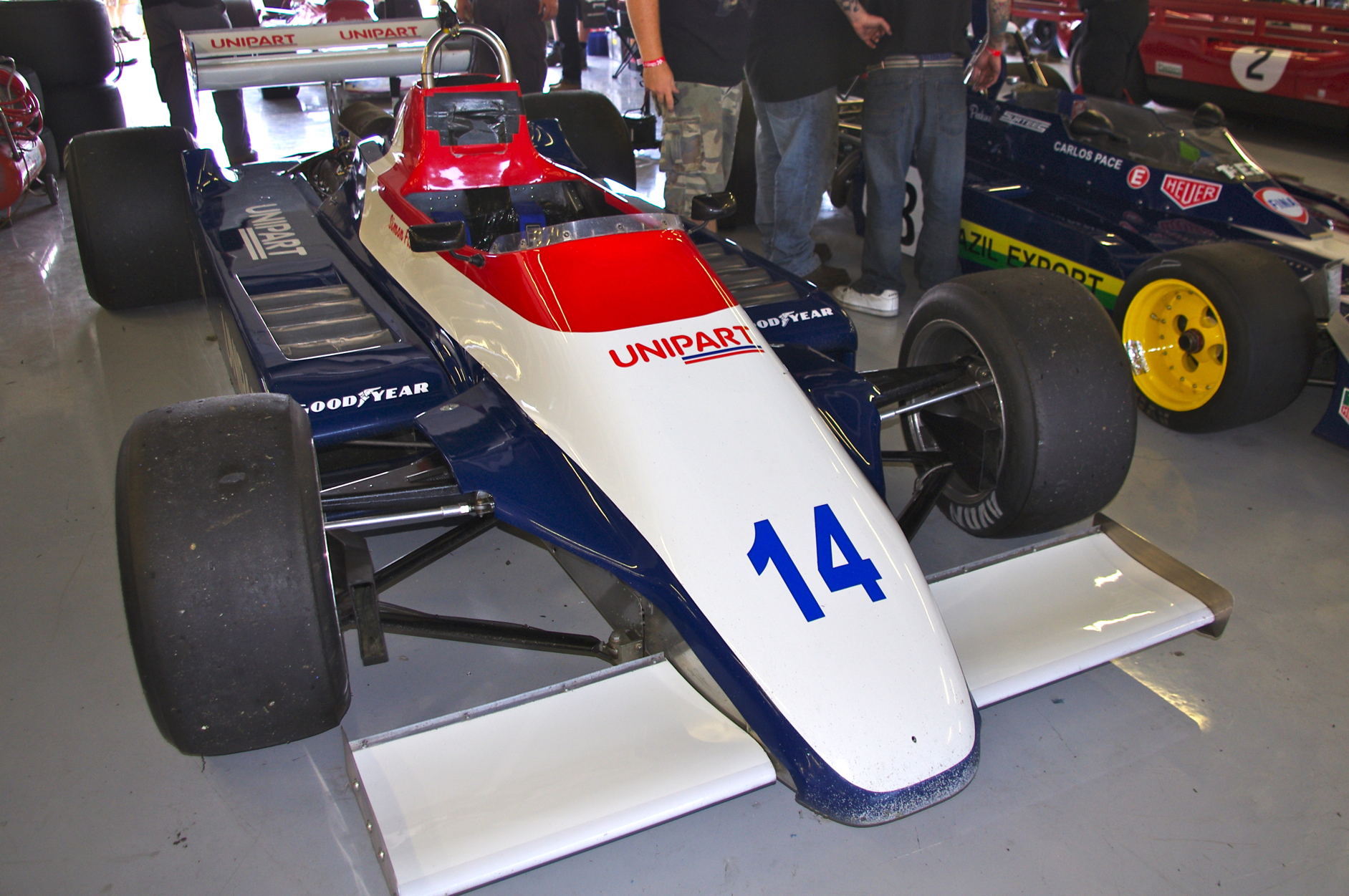
- A variant of the Ensign N180 (pictured in 2012) which Londoño drove in the 1981 Brazilian Grand Prix
- Born: Ricardo Londoño Bridge; 8 August 1949; Medellín, Colombia
- Died: 18 July 2009 (aged 59); San Bernardo del Viento, Colombia

Formula One World Championship career
- Nationality: (Colombia) Colombian
- Active years: 1981
- Team: Ensign
- Entries: 1 (0 starts)
- Championships: 0
- Wins: 0
- Podiums: 0
- Career points: 0
- Pole positions: 0
- Fastest laps: 0
- First entry: 1981 Brazilian Grand Prix

Ricardo Londoño Bridge (8 August 1949 – 18 July 2009) was a racing driver from Colombia. He had an unremarkable international career apart from his one attempt at Formula One in the 1981 Brazilian Grand Prix with Ensign. Londoño was the first racing driver from Colombia to participate in a Formula One race weekend.

Born in Medellín, he raced in stock car and motorcycle speed championships until the 1970s and claimed many victories. Londoño left for the United States in 1979 and took part in IMSA GT Championship races. The following year, he placed seventh overall in the 24 Hours of Daytona and twelfth in the Can-Am standings. Londoño received support from coffee growing and drug trafficking and this enabled him to compete in the season-closing British Formula One Championship at Silverstone where he finished seventh. Despite his inexperience, he was selected by Ensign to compete in the 1981 Brazilian Grand Prix, mainly for financial purposes. Londoño took part in the Grand Prix's acclimatisation session and recorded fast lap times before hitting Keke Rosberg and was thus not granted a super licence by the Fédération Internationale du Sport Automobile. He was therefore dismissed from the Ensign team.

Londoño's illegal support enabled him to race in three Formula Two events in 1981 with the Docking-Spitzey Team-Toleman and took a best result of ninth at the Pau Grand Prix. Despite the arrest of several of his sponsors which prevented him from participating in the 1982 Can-Am season, he continued to drive in the IMSA GT Championship until 1986 when he withdrew from motor racing. Londoño subsequently returned to Colombia and carried out illegal activities related to drug trafficking. A majority of his property was seized by the Colombian courts in December 2000 and he was murdered nine years later.

== Biography ==
=== Early career ===
Londoño was born on 8 August 1949 in the Colombian city of Medellín. His racing career began in the Colombian Stock Car and Motorcycle Speed Championships. The extent of Londoño activities in this era of Colombia is rather obscure but several periodicals of that time indicate that he won many races in the country, allowing him to become the national champion in various categories in motorcycle and stock car racing in the 1970s. In his period, he was caught up in the centre of drug trafficking activity that was taking place in the outskirts of the Colombian capital Bogotá and met the drug lord Pablo Escobar for the first time.

Londoño moved to North America in 1979 and took part in the 12 Hours of Sebring and the Daytona 250 Miles in the IMSA GT Championship. He shared Porsche 935 Turbo with John Gunn and George Garces in Sebring and failed to finish. Londoño used the same car to finish 18th in Daytona and placed 45th in the Drivers' Championship. In 1980, Londoño raced at Daytona alongside Mauricio de Narváez and Albert Naon and the trio came seventh overall and second in the GTO class. That same year, with finance from a car dealership in Cali, a sports equipment supplier and private partners, he partook in nine out of ten races of the Can-Am season with his own team, Londoño-Bridge Racing Team and drove a Lola T530. Londoño was competitive throughout the season and took six top ten finishes with a best result of fifth at Mosport Park. He accumulated five points which put him twelfth in the standings.

=== European tour and Formula One ===
With support from the National Federation of Coffee Growers of Colombia and Pablo Escobar, Londoño left for Europe in late 1980 and rented a Lotus 78 from Colin Bennett so he could participate in the season-closing British Formula One Championship round at Silverstone, the Pentax Trophy. Bennett called him "promising". Londoño suffered a major accident in practice but his team's mechanics repaired his car in time for the race. He finished one lap behind race winner Emilio de Villota in seventh having moved up eleven from his starting position. Londoño briefly returned to the United States to compete in the 1981 24 Hours of Daytona for Red Lobster Racing, partnering Kenper Miller and Dave Cowart, but the BMW M1 the trio drove failed to finish, retiring with engine problems after 346 laps.

That same year, the Ensign Racing Formula One team had severe financial difficulties after its main sponsor left. After the first race of the season, the United States Grand Prix West, Ensign's owner Mo Nunn sought a driver to help redress the team's situation. Bennett had joined Ensign as a co-owner and suggested to Nunn that he employ Londoño for the Brazilian Grand Prix. As he was virtually unknown in the Formula One world, some believed that Londoño's name was a pseudonym. Formula One was returning to Jacarepaguá for the first time in three years and an acclimatisation session was held for drivers to learn the circuit. As he did not have the necessary super licence to take part in the Grand Prix, Londoño was allowed to drive in the session and did ten laps of the track with his best lap four seconds slower than session leader Carlos Reutemann.

However, Keke Rosberg was irritated at Londoño and braked earlier than expected in front of Londoño and this caused the latter to hit Rosberg. Londoño was not granted his super licence by the Fédération Internationale du Sport Automobile as his team had not provided the necessary information and he was judged to have caused the crash with Rosberg. The refusal of him being granted a super licence was also attributed to Formula One's commercial rights owner Bernie Ecclestone discovering Londoño's links with the Medellín Cartel and Escobar. His team kept the money he brought to them but elected to draft Marc Surer who finished the car in fourth place. Nevertheless, despite the controversy, Londoño was the first Colombian driver to have taken part in a Formula One race weekend.

=== Final motor racing years ===
Due to his national support, Londoño participated in three Formula Two races for Docking-Spitzey Team-Toleman after managing to convince the team's manager Alan Docking via telephone to recruit him for 1981. Although he qualified last for the Pau Grand Prix he took advantage of a slippery track and other cars retiring due to mechanical problems to finish ninth. Londoño's next race was at the Autodromo di Pergusa and retired after twenty-five laps with an engine failure in spite of a good qualifying performance. A mechanical issue sidelined his race at the Circuit de Spa-Francorchamps after fifteen laps, and was unable to start the Donington Park round after crashing in the warm-up session.

At the end of 1981, Londoño returned to Colombia, and won the Grand Touring class of the 3 Hours of Medellín. Several of his sponsors were arrested by police before he could partake in a planned 1982 venture into Can-Am and thus did not race in that year. In 1983, Londoño partook in three races of that year's IMSA GT Championship and did not have a large amount of success apart from a sixth-place finish alongside co-driver John Gunn in a Phoenix JG1 at the Daytona 250 Miles.

The following year, Londoño remained as a competitor in the IMSA GT Championship but was now behind the wheel of a Chevrolet Corvette in three races. Londoño's best result was him driving solo en route to finishing fourteenth out of twenty-three cars at the Daytona 250 Miles. He again was entered in three races in 1985 but failed to attend either the 24 Hours of Daytona and the 12 Hours of Sebring. Thus, his only race of the season in Miami saw him retire his Pontiac Firebird after eleven laps. Partnering with Diego Montoya (the uncle of two-time Indianapolis 500 winner Juan Pablo Montoya) for the 1986 24 Hours of Daytona, Londoño eventually dropped out of the race and ended his career in motor racing.

=== Later life and murder ===
Upon retirement, Londoño began to sell aircraft, helicopters and boats to recognised drug traffickers and came close to a trafficking ring. It was discovered in November 1998 that one of Londoño's properties contained 1,200 kilograms (2,600 lb) of cocaine. Despite this setback, in June 1999, he made a brief reappearance in motor racing at a departmental speed motorcycle race in Medellín and won the category for bikes in the range of 1,001 to 2,000cc. In December 2000, the Colombian courts issued a constriction order against Londoño which saw the removal of $10 million worth of vintage cars and property that was acquired illegally through drug trafficking and his links with the Medellín cartel. The operation, named Blanco y verde ( "white and green"), was conducted in the departments of Antioquia, Córdoba and the Archipelago of San Andrés which saw almost all his property seized. Londoño however avoided spending time in prison.

Londoño was staying in his hotel in Cispatá Bay, a nearby seaside resort of San Bernardo del Viento in the Gulf of Morrosquillo where on 18 July 2009 he was murdered along with two consultants of an illicit enterprise. Witnesses reported that six men working in a settlement accounts sponsored by a Colombian drug lord, arose and opened fire. Londoño was shot twelve times including three in his head. He was buried two days later near the parish of St. Mary of the Angels (Parroquia Santa María de los Ángeles) in his hometown of Medellín. The alleged killer, Jasson Erlevis Leudo Chavera, aka "Kevin", a senior member of the criminal gang Los Urabeños based in San Antero (in the Gulf of Morrosquillo) was arrested in May 2010.

== Private life ==
He was married to Janet Toledo Franco with whom he had four children. Londoño was nicknamed "Cuchilla" which is a rough translation of the word "Razor". In 1980, Carlos Eduardo Uribe made a short film entitled Ciento ochenta kilómetros por hora. The documentary presents the automotive world in Colombia and the country's leading representatives of the era of the sport, Londoño, Roberto Guerrero and Pilar Mejía.

== Complete Formula One results ==
(key)

Year	Entrant	Chassis	Engine	1	2	3	4	5	6	7	8	9	10	11	12	13	14	15	WDC	Points
1981	Ensign Racing Team	Ensign N180B	Cosworth V8	USW	BRA; DNP	ARG	SMR	BEL	MON	ESP	FRA	GBR	GER	AUT	NED	ITA	CAN	CPL	NC	0
