= Juan Gossaín =

Colombian journalist and writer (born 1949)

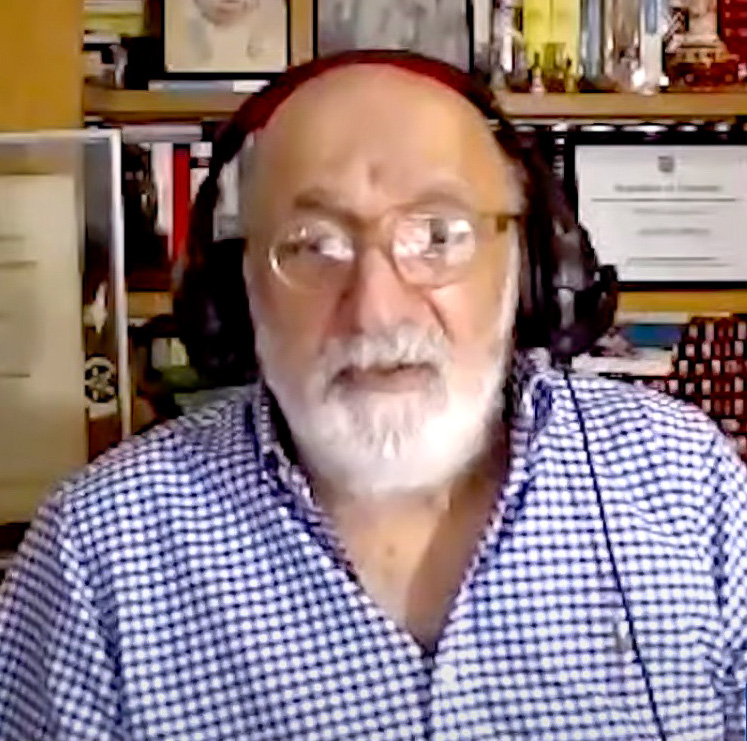
- Gossaín, c. 2021
- Born: Juan Antonio Gossaín Abdallah; January 17, 1949 (age 77); San Bernardo del Viento, Córdoba, Colombia
- Occupations: Journalist; politician; radio host; writer
- Employers: El Heraldo; Semana; El Espectador; La FM; RCN Radio
- Notable credits: RCN Radio Anchor (1998‍–‍2015); El Heraldo; Radio Nacional de Colombia
- Spouses: Margoth Ricci (m. 1984)
- Children: 2

Juan Antonio Gossaín Abdallah (born January 17, 1949) is a Colombian writer, journalist and novelist. Known for his distinctive journalistic style, he is one of the most renowned veteran journalists in the country.

Born in San Bernardo del Viento, Córdoba, he served as director of the RCN Radio network and has twice won the Simón Bolívar National Journalism Prize for best radio journalist.

== Early life, marriage and family ==
Juan Antonio Gossaín Abdallah was born on January 17, 1949, in San Bernardo del Viento, Córdoba, to Juan Gossaín Lajud and Berta Abdallah de Gossaín (née Abdallah Lajud). His father had migrated from Lebanon in 1940, settling in Lorica, Córdoba, at that time the main destination for migrants from Syria, Lebanon, and Palestine.

Gossaín began his career in journalism in 1971, while a public accounting student, after moving to Bogotá to work for the newspaper El Espectador, for which he wrote from his home in San Bernardo del Viento. In 1975, he moved to Cartagena to work for the newspaper El Heraldo. He married Margoth Ricci on March 24, 1984, and the couple had two children named Danilo and Isabela, and he has at least two grandchildren named Juan and Ana Gabriela. Gossaín currently resides in Cartagena. He was hospitalized in 2012.

Juan Gossaín was born in San Bernardo del Viento and resides in Cartagena, Colombia. These cities are shown relative to the capital city of Bogotá.

=== Career ===
Juan Gossaín started his journalism career writing for El Espectador newspaper from around 1968 to 1971. He later became Chief at El Heraldo, Barranquilla.

Gossaín worked as the director of the RCN Radio station for about 26 years, from February 12, 1984 to June 30, 2010. Gossaín hosted a very popular morning talk show. One of his former colleagues at RCN was Humberto De la Calle, former vice president of Colombia and a negotiator during the peace process, about which Gossaín interviewed him. Gossaín retired in 2010. Over the course of his career as a journalist, he covered at least 10 presidential campaigns and even did a special for El Tiempo newspaper about electoral corruption.

Aside from radio journalism, Gossaín was responsible for writing several novels such as La balada de Maria Abdala, San Bernando del Viento, and La mala hierba. The novels were notable for their atmosphere of suspense.

Since retirement, Gossaín has opened the Centro de Altos Estudios Juan Gossaín, an institute aimed at supporting emerging writers.

=== Notable literary works ===
He wrote the novel La balada de María Abdala. The story is about a dead man who returns to the living in order to witness the burial of his mother.

Puro cuento, 2004, was one of Gossaín's most popular and unique works. This novel contained eighteen stories that were results of stories that he knew and experienced after leaving Córdoba, Colombia. These stories were unique and different because the magic of the Caribbean that had previously been seen of his novels was almost completely absent. What Gossaín experienced and portrayed in this novel was the feeling of grayness and the buildings that invaded the souls of the people who lived in them. It had an unfamiliar tone and many of Gossaín's readers were hooked to the work that he had created.

=== In popular culture ===
Luis Soriano operates a mobile book library, called a Biblioburro, that uses a donkey as his means of transport. He asked for a donation from Gossaín and received Gossaín's second novel, The Ballad of Maria Abdala, as well a Gossaín's report about Soriano's effort on RCN Radio, which led to further donations.

=== Impact ===
Juan Gossaín received the National Simón Bolívar Award in both 1995 and 1997. The award recognizes some of the most influential figures in Colombia, and it is highly respected nationwide. Winning the award is considered a major achievement, and Gossaín’s two honors demonstrate the lasting influence and high regard for his work.

He has also participated in the Carnaval Internacional de las Artes (translated: International Arts Carnival) for three years with Juan Manuel Roca.

== Awards ==
- The National Simón Bolívar Award in 1977, 1985, 1989 (Premio a la vida y obra en la modalidad de los medios electrÓnicos), 1990, 1991, 1995, 1997, 1998, 2000, 2003,
- Colombia-Spain Award for Best Journalist of the Year (Premio Colombia-España al mejor periodista del año)

== Bibliography ==
- La mala hierba
- La nostalgia del alcatraz
- La balada de María Abdala (2003)
- Puro cuento
- San Bernando del Viento
