= Aniceto Molina =

Colombian musician (1939–2015)

- Molina holding his accordion

Background information
- Born: Aniceto Molina Aguirre; 17 April 1939; Pueblo Nuevo, Cordoba, Colombia
- Died: 30 March 2015 (aged 75) San Antonio, Texas, United States
- Genres: Cumbia; vallenato
- Occupations: Singer; songwriter

Aniceto Molina Aguirre (17 April 1939 – 30 March 2015) was a Colombian cumbia singer-songwriter and accordionist who began playing the instrument at the age of 12. His career lasted for more than four decades. He was popular in Latin American countries.

== Life ==
Molina was born in Pueblo Nuevo, Cordoba, (Colombia), and lived in Mexico City, Mexico from 1973 to 1984.

In 1984, he moved to San Antonio, Texas. Some of his most successful songs include "La Cumbia Sampuesana", "El Campanero", "La Gorra" and "La Burrita". Molina formed his group "Los Sabaneros" in 1979.

== Death ==
Molina died on 30 March 2015 in San Antonio, Texas, at the age of 75, due to a bacterial infection in his lungs. He had been hospitalized since February.

== Discography ==
- Cumpliendo un sueño (1960)
- Vol. 2 (1962)
- Para bailar (1964)
- Playas marinas (1966)
- El Salvador vallenato (1968)
- La laguna sabanera (1970)
- Cumbias con mariachi (1971)
- La bicicleta (1972)
- Josefina (1973)
- Tropicales (1974)
- Cumbias y más cumbias (1975)
- Inmortales (1976)
- Vallenato mexicano (1977)
- A solas con mi acordeón (1978)
- Brindemos por las mujeres (1979)
- 10 años tequila y cerveza (1980)
- El poeta del amor (1981)
- Vámonos de rumba (1982)
- Por ustedes (1983)
- Cumbia tropical (1984)
- Gracias México (1985)
- Los Sabaneros de Molina (1987)
- Puro vallenato (1989)
- Así es Colombia (1990)
- El rey de Colombia (1991)
- El rey de la cumbia (1992)
- Las mujeres de... (1993)
- Vallenato (1995)
- Texas ya baila... que chimba (1995)
- Mucha quebradita (1996)
- De Vallenato a Cumbia (1997)
- El Tigre Sabanero (1998)
- De parranda con... (1998)
- El burro moro (1999)
- Puro movimiento (2000)
- El cóndor legendario (2001)
- Embajador de la cumbia y vallenato clásico (2002)
- Aniceto Molina En Vivo (2002)
- Fiesta cumbiambera (2002)
- El Peluquero Salvatrucha (2002)
- Las 16 de Tony (2003)
- El Garrobero (2004)
- Vendí mi moto (2004)
- La Machaca (2004)
- Como siempre echando pa'lante (2004)
- Más sabroso que nunca (2005)
- México y Colombia (2006)
- Mi sombrero sabanero (2006)
- La trayectoria (2007)
- El Toro de tres palos (2008)
- Señor tabernero (2008)
- La Mariscada (2009)
- Sembrando café (2009)
- Ayer, Hoy y Mañana (Cuando el hombre llega a viejo) (2010)
- El machito (2013)
- Desde el Cielo (2015)
- Desde el Cielo Vol. 2 (2015)
- La Despedida (2015) -Sang by Edson Molina
