= Javier Pereira =

Javier Pereira may refer to:

- Javier Pereira (supercentenarian), Zenú Indian from Colombia
- Javier Pereira (actor), Spanish actor
- Javier Pereira (footballer), Spanish footballer
