= Biblioburro =

Traveling library in Colombia

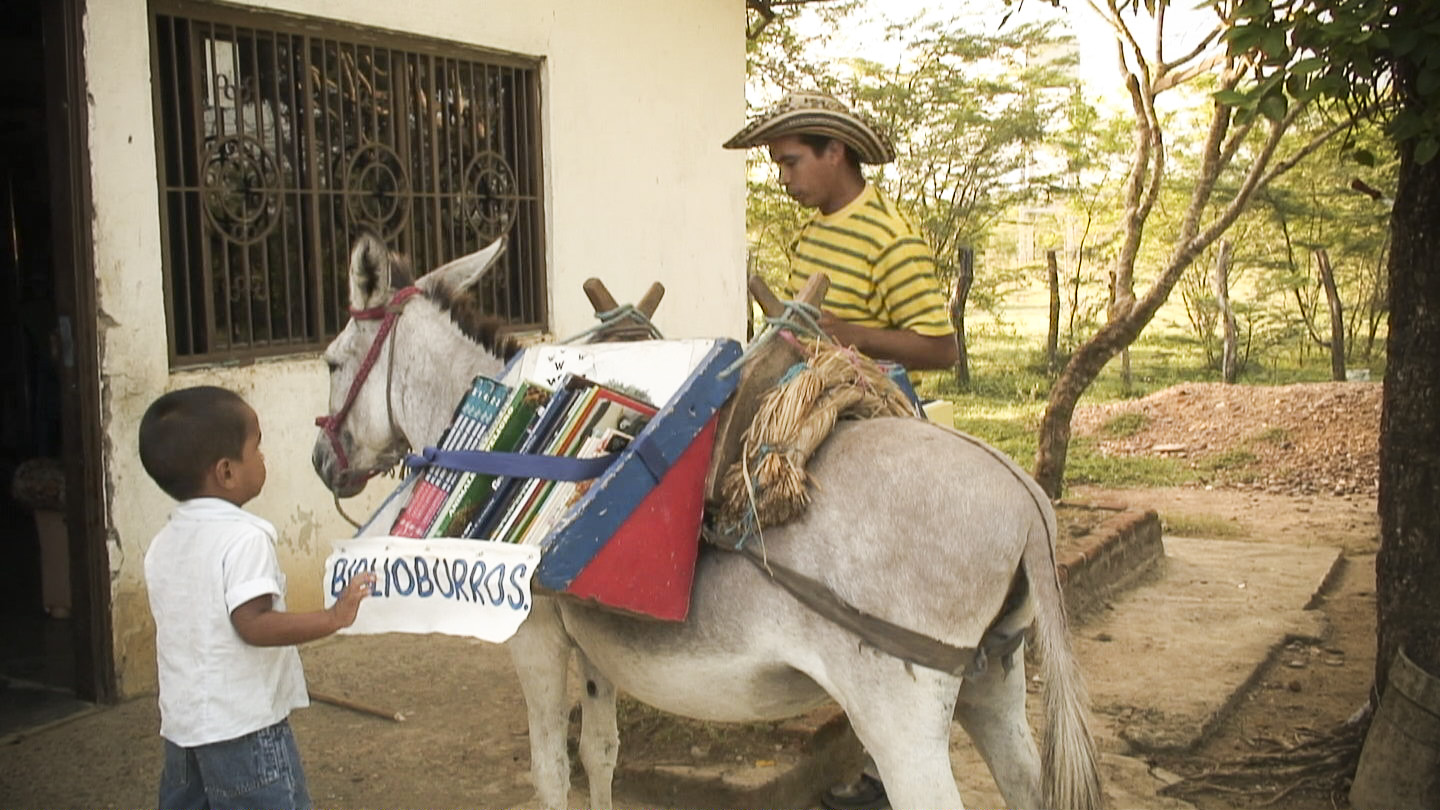
Luis Soriano (center) and one of his burros in 2006

The Biblioburro (The donkey library) is a traveling library that distributes books to patrons from the backs of two donkeys, Alfa and Beto. The program was created in La Gloria, Colombia, by Luis Soriano. The biblioburro operates within the central municipalities of the Department of Magdalena, on Colombia's Caribbean shore.

Soriano became fascinated with reading as a child and obtained a college degree in Spanish literature after studying with a professor who visited his village twice a month. A primary school teacher by profession, Soriano developed the idea after witnessing first-hand the power reading had on his students, most of whom had lived through intense life conflicts at a young age. Starting in the late 1990s, Soriano traveled to communities in Colombia's Caribbean Sea hinterlands with a portable library, which began with 70 books.

Soriano wrote to Juan Gossaín, a Colombian journalist and writer, after having heard him read excerpts from his novel The Ballad of Maria Abdala on a radio program. Soriano asked Gossaín for a copy of his book to be distributed on the Biblioburro, details that Gossaín broadcast on his radio program. The response created a flood of book donations and Soriano's collection soon expanded to 4,800 volumes. As of November 2009, a library building next to Soriano's house has been completed funded in part by donations from the public, and it opened as the first library in La Gloria. Additional funding is also provided by the director of a community library, located nearly 180 miles (290 km) from the Caribbean shore in Santa Maria, who hired Soriano as a satellite employee in order to share a portion of its US $7,000 annual budget.

Children's adventure stories have remained one of the most popular items distributed by the Biblioburros. In addition to encyclopedia volumes, novels, and medical texts, other items distributed by the Biblioburro include Horacio Quiroga's animal fable Anaconda, the Dictionary of the Spanish Language of the Royal Spanish Academy (Diccionario de la lengua española de la Real Academia Española) and a number of Time–Life travel pictorial books. Books lost from the collection include a sex education manual and a copy of Laura Esquivel's 1989 novel Like Water for Chocolate, both of which were not returned by borrowers. A copy of Paulo Coelho's 1990 novel Brida was stolen by bandits, who tied up Soriano after attempting to rob him and discovered he had no money.

Colombian documentary filmmaker Carlos Rendón Zipagauta has made a film that tells the story of Soriano and the Biblioburros.

In June 2012, Soriano had a leg amputated after an accident involving one of his burros, but as of January 2013 he continued, committed to his work.

== See also ==
- List of libraries in Colombia
