= Carlos Rendón Zipagauta =

Colombian-Belgian documentary filmmaker (born 1955)

- Born: Carlos Rendón Zipagauta; 29 September 1955; Cali, Colombia
- Occupations: film director screenwriter
- Years active: 1986–

Carlos Rendón Zipagauta (Cali, 29 September 1955) is a Colombian-Belgian documentary filmmaker. Rendón Zipagauta studied film and screenwriting in Belgium, where he lived for 16 years. He began as assistant then co-director to Jean Christophe Lamy. He returned to Colombia to shoot documentaries. His 1993 film Nukak Makú, about the indigenous Nukak peoples, won festival prizes in France and Belgium enabling also EU grants to make further documentaries.

Returning to Colombia Rendón Zipagauta has taught cinema at the University of Santa Magdalena since 2004, and teaches French at the Alliance Française of Santa Marta.

== Filmography (Director) ==
Documentaries

- 1991 : Salseros, on Cali's salsa music
- 1992 : Tamalameque, on the town Tamalameque
- 1993 : Nukak Makú, on the indigenous Nukak people of Colombia
- 1997 : Ciénaga Grande on the grand swamps
- 1998 : Charanguita
- 2004 : Porteur d'eau produced by Scarfilm
- 2007 : Biblioburro, on Biblioburro The Donkey Library

Screenwriter

- 1988 : P.O.V., TV series
