= Javier Pereira (longevity claimant) =

Colombian alleged supercentenarian (died c. 1958)

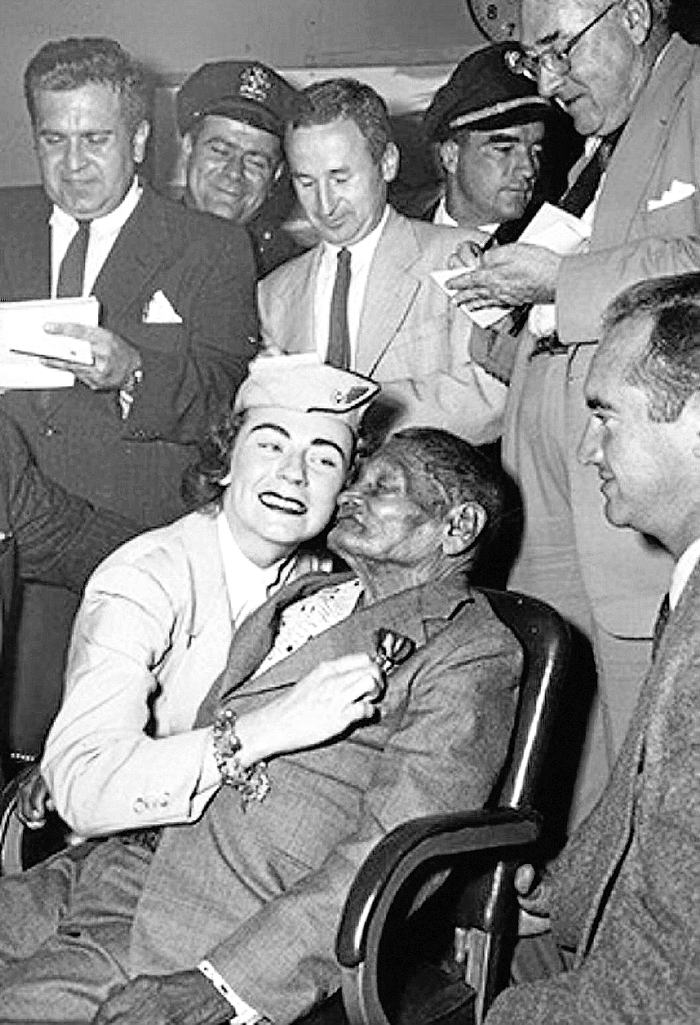
- Photograph of Javier Pereira taken in 1947
- Born: 1789 (claimed); Tuchín, Cartagena Province, Viceroyalty of New Granada
- Died: 30 March 1958 (claimed aged 169); Montería, Córdoba, Colombia
- Known for: Supercentenarian

Javier Pereira (allegedly born 1789, in the Viceroyalty of New Granada, date of death unknown but most commonly given as March 30, 1958) was a Zenú from Colombia who was reputedly over 160 years old at the time of his death.

Although his death is mistakenly said in some books to have been in "1955 or 1956", Pereira was alive and well when he visited New York City (at the expense of the Ripley's Believe It or Not publishers) in September 1956 for eight days of examinations at the Cornell Medical Center, and healthy enough to punch four people at a press conference at the Biltmore Hotel on September 27. His death was announced from Colombia after it happened on March 30, 1958. An Associated Press dispatch from Montería reported that "Javier Pereira, the little Indian believed by many to be the world's oldest man, died last night. Experts said there was no way to fix his exact age, but some persons claim he was 168.", and sources all claim that he was born in 1789.

Interviewed by historians, he was able to supply information about well-known historical events such as the Siege of Cartagena, fought in 1815, as well as about Indian conflicts and a terrible famine that had taken place years before. Asked about the secret of his longevity, Pereira said that one must chew cocoa beans, drink plenty of coffee, smoke a big cigar now and then, and not worry. Pereira was flown to New York City to be checked by teams of modern doctors. He was four feet four inches tall and weighed seventy-five pounds. He had no teeth but his hair was still brown. He had the blood pressure and arterial health of a young man, could easily stand on one leg and pirouette, and walk several blocks and up a couple of flights of stairs without losing his breath. One doctor said he had the appearance of a man "more than 150 years old."

Four feet, four inches tall and weighing 82 pounds, Pereira had five wives, all of whom he outlived; Pereira even outlived all his children and even his grandchildren. Pereira was "discovered" in 1954; allegedly his last remaining grandchild had died in 1941 at the age of 85. The most specific death date reported is 30 March 1958 in his home town of Montería. His obituary was reported in Time for 14 April 1958 on page 88. In 1957, Colombia issued a postage stamp commemorating Pereira.
