= 1980 Pau Grand Prix =

Race details
- Date: 25 May 1980
- Official name: XL Pau Grand Prix
- Location: Pau, France
- Course: Temporary Street Circuit
- Course length: 2.760 km (1.720 miles)
- Distance: 73 laps, 206.882 km (128.550 miles)

Pole position
| Driver | (United Kingdom) Derek Warwick | Toleman-Hart |
- Time: 1:12.09

Fastest lap
| Driver | (United Kingdom) Brian Henton | Toleman-Hart |
- Time: 1:14.59

Podium
| First | (France) Richard Dallest | AGS-BMW |
| Second | (Italy) Siegfried Stohr | Toleman-Hart |
| Third | (United Kingdom) Brian Henton | Toleman-Hart |

The 1980 Pau Grand Prix was a Formula Two motor race held on 25 May 1980 at the Pau circuit, in Pau, Pyrénées-Atlantiques, France. The Grand Prix was won by Richard Dallest, driving the AGS. Siegfried Stohr finished second and Brian Henton third.

== Classification ==
=== Race ===
| Pos | No | Driver | Vehicle | Laps | Time/Retired | Grid |
|---|---|---|---|---|---|---|
| 1 | 32 | (France) Richard Dallest | AGS-BMW | 73 | 1hr 34min 03.57sec | |
| 2 | 15 | (Italy) Siegfried Stohr | Toleman-Hart | 73 | + 1.51 s | |
| 3 | 7 | (United Kingdom) Brian Henton | Toleman-Hart | 73 | + 34.92 s | |
| 4 | 2 | (New Zealand) Mike Thackwell | March-BMW | 73 | + 50.07 s | |
| 5 | 16 | (Argentina) Miguel Ángel Guerra | Minardi-BMW | 72 | + 1 lap | |
| 6 | 11 | (Italy) Alberto Colombo | March-BMW | 71 | + 2 laps | |
| 7 | 47 | (Switzerland) Fredy Schnarwiler | March-BMW | 70 | + 3 laps | |
| 8 | 3 | (Germany) Manfred Winkelhock | March-BMW | 70 | + 3 laps | |
| 9 | 23 | (Italy) Arturo Merzario | Merzario-BMW | 66 | + 7 laps | |
| Ret | 20 | (France) Patrick Gaillard | Maurer-BMW | 58 | Battery lead | |
| Ret | 22 | (Italy) Piero Necchi | Merzario-BMW | 43 | Accident | |
| Ret | 14 | (Netherlands) Huub Rothengatter | Toleman-Hart | 40 | Drive shaft | |
| Ret | 13 | (Brazil) Chico Serra | March-BMW | 32 | Spun off | |
| Ret | 1 | (Italy) Teo Fabi | March-BMW | 27 | Oil pressure | |
| Ret | 18 | (Italy) Bruno Corradi | Minardi-BMW | 19 | Accident | |
| Ret | 8 | (United Kingdom) Derek Warwick | Toleman-Hart | 14 | Accident | 1 |
| Ret | 6 | (Italy) Andrea de Cesaris | March-BMW | 13 | Accident | |
| Ret | 19 | (Germany) Helmet Henzler | Maurer-BMW | 6 | Battery lead | |
| Ret | 12 | (Italy) Oscar Pedersoli | March-BMW | 4 | Accident | |
Fastest Lap: Brian Henton (Toleman-Hart) – 1:14.59

| Preceded by 1979 Pau Grand Prix | Pau Grand Prix; 1980 | Succeeded by 1981 Pau Grand Prix |
