= La Apartada =

Coordinates: 8.10056°N 75.3825°W

- Municipality and town
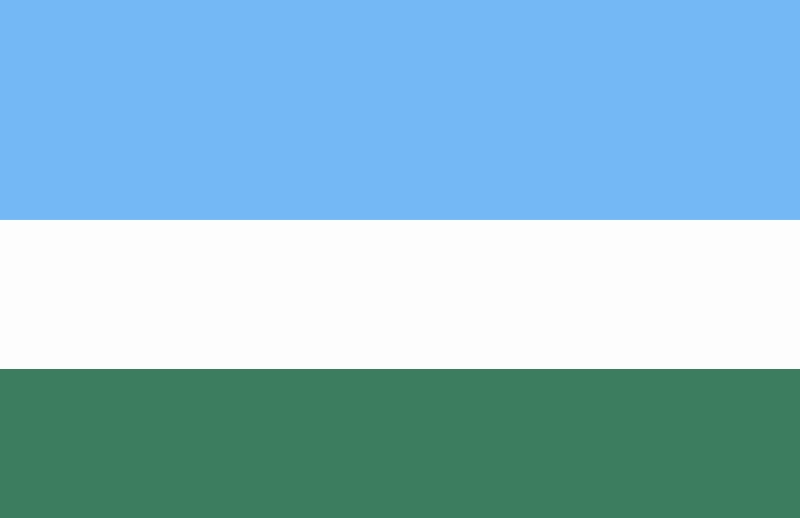
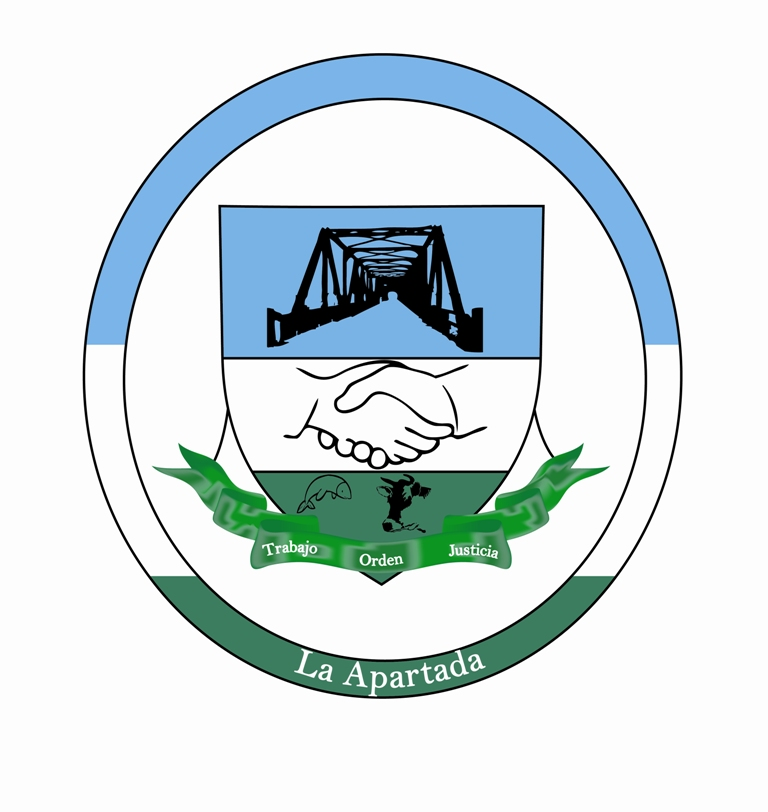
- Flag Coat of arms

- Location of the municipality and town of La Apartada in Córdoba, Department of Colombia.
- Country: Colombia
- Department: Córdoba Department

Area
  - Total: 241 km^{2} (93 sq mi)

Population (Census 2018)
  - Total: 13,742
  - Density: 57.0/km^{2} (148/sq mi)
- Time zone: UTC-5 (Colombia Standard Time)

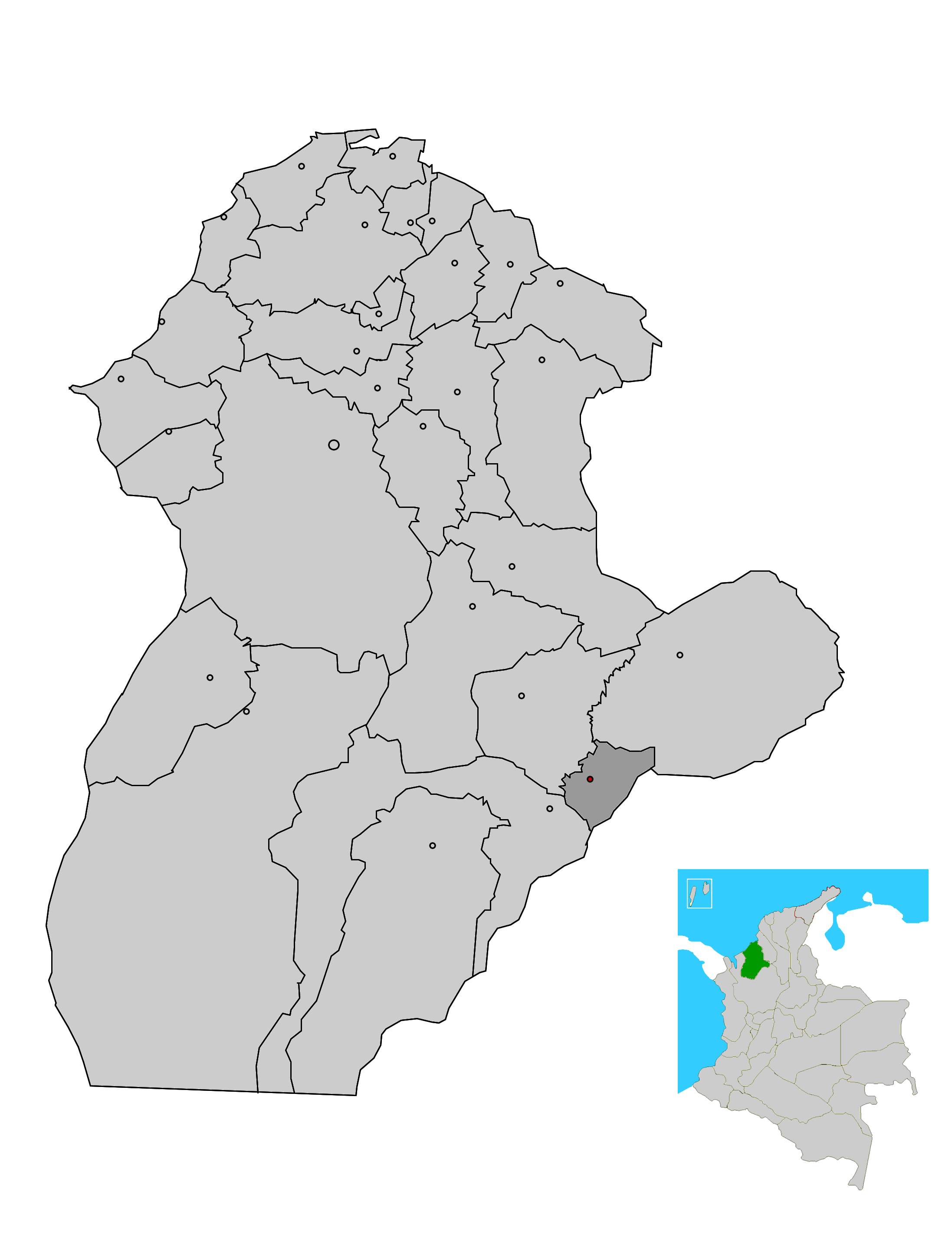
Municipality and town of La Apartada in the Córdoba Department.

La Apartada (Spanish pronunciation: [la apaɾˈtaða]) is a town and municipality located in the Córdoba Department, northern Colombia. According to 2020 estimates, the population of La Apartada was 13,742, with a population density of 57 persons per square kilometer.
