= Momil =

Coordinates: 9°14′N 75°41′W

- Municipality and town
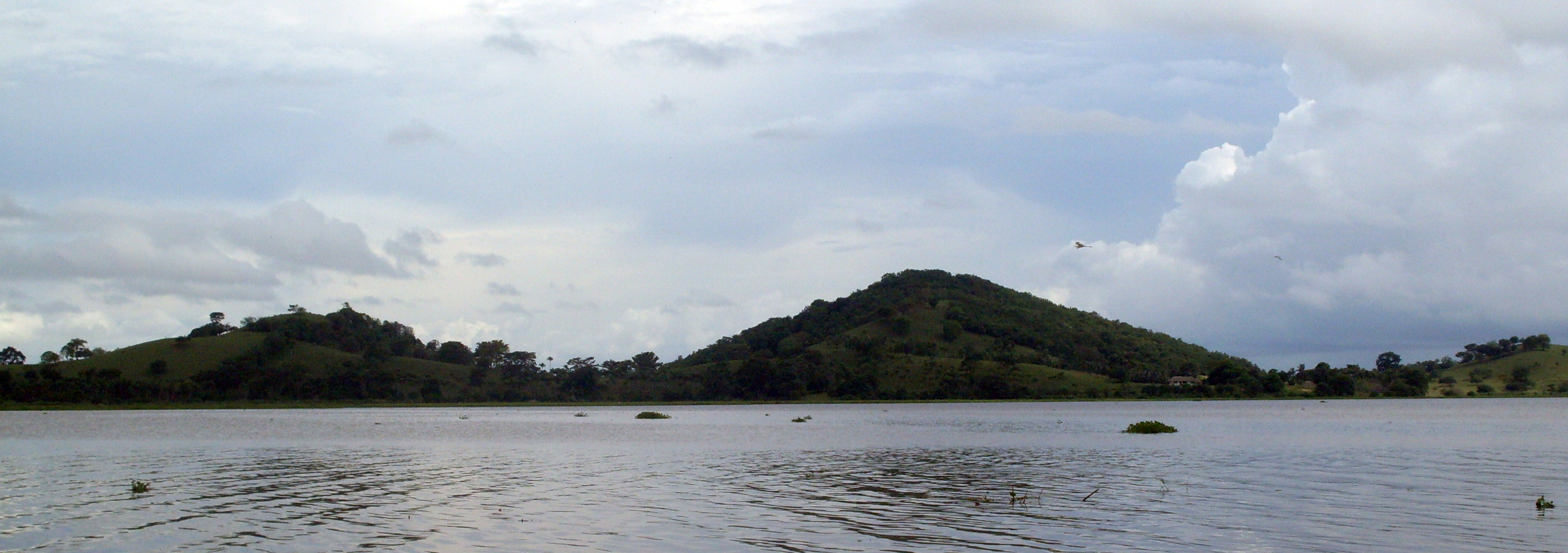

- Flag

- Location of the municipality and town of Momil in the Córdoba Department of Colombia.
- Country: Colombia
- Department: Córdoba Department

Area
  - Total: 152 km^{2} (59 sq mi)

Population (Census 2018)
  - Total: 16,264
  - Density: 107/km^{2} (277/sq mi)
- Time zone: UTC-5 (Colombia Standard Time)

Momil is a town and municipality located in the Córdoba Department, northern Colombia.

According to 2018 estimates, the population of Momil was 16,264, with a density ratio of 110 persons per square kilometer.
