= Tuchín =

Coordinates: 9°11′N 75°33′W

- Municipality and town
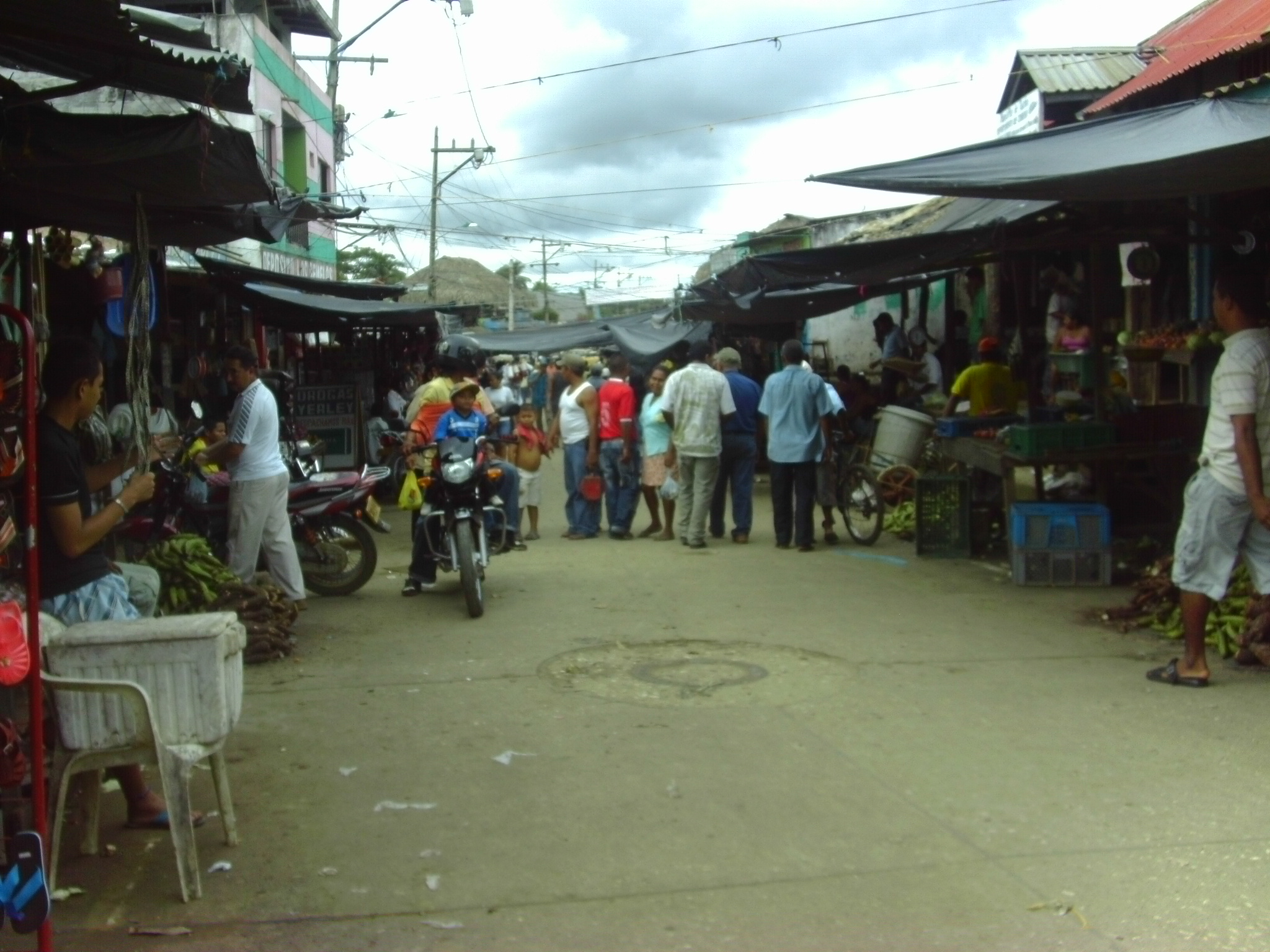

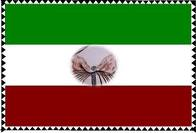
- Flag

- Location of the municipality and town of Tuchín in the Córdoba Department of Colombia.
- Country: Colombia
- Department: Córdoba Department
- Time zone: UTC-5 (Colombia Standard Time)

Tuchín is a town and municipality located in the Córdoba Department, northern Colombia.

== Geography ==
Tuchín is located in the northeast of Córdoba at an elevation of 106 meters above sea level, 127 km from Montería. The municipality borders San Antonio de Palmito and Sincelejo in the Department of Sucre to the north; San Andrés de Sotavento to the east and south; and Chimá and Momil to the west.

== Population ==
It has a population of 52,000, the majority of whom belong to the indigenous Zenú ethnic group.
