= Los Córdobas =

Coordinates: 8°54′N 76°22′W

- Municipality and town
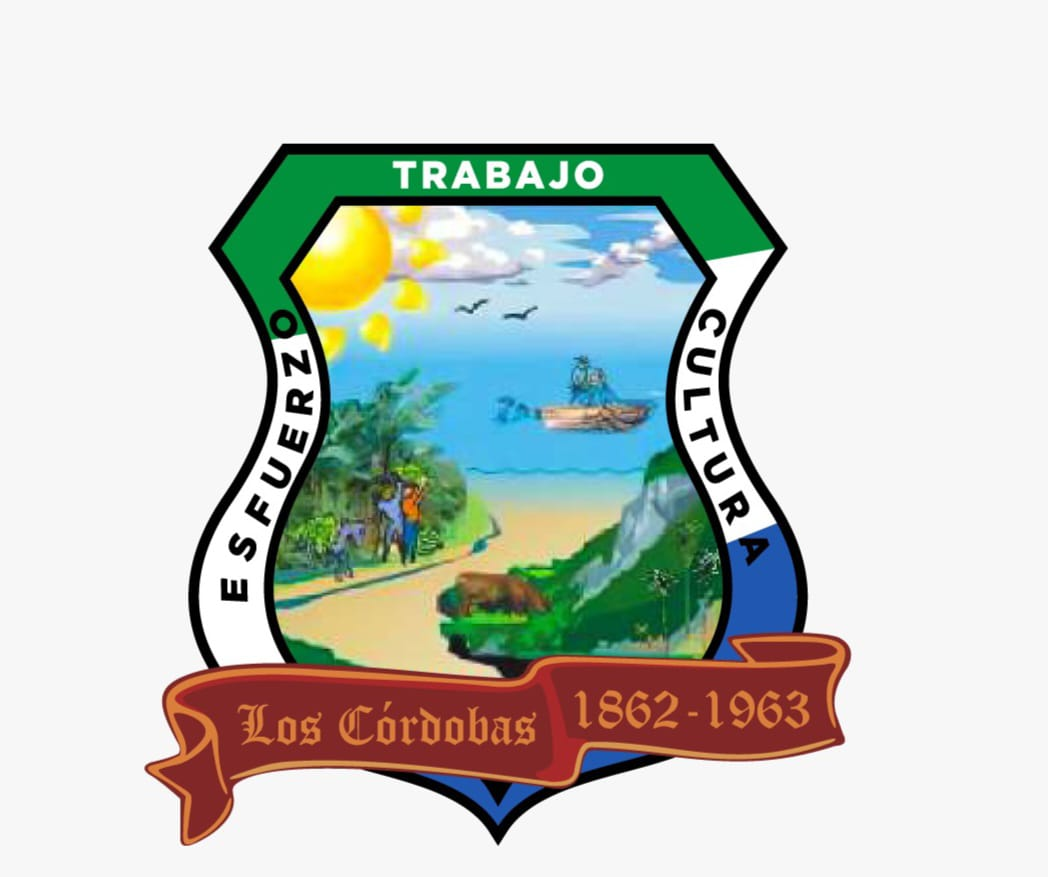
- Flag Coat of arms

- Location of the municipality and town of Los Córdobas in the Córdoba Department of Colombia.
- Country: Colombia
- Department: Córdoba Department

Population (Census 2018)
  - Total: 15,886
- Time zone: UTC-5 (Colombia Standard Time)

Los Córdobas is a town and municipality located in the Córdoba Department, northern Colombia.

As per 2018 estimates, the Los Córdobas population was 15,886.
