= 1979 Pau Grand Prix =

Race details
- Date: 4 June 1979
- Official name: XXXIX Pau Grand Prix
- Location: Pau, France
- Course: Temporary Street Circuit
- Course length: 2.760 km (1.720 miles)
- Distance: 73 laps, 206.882 km (128.550 miles)
- Weather: Rain

Pole position
Driver	(Switzerland) Marc Surer	March-BMW
- Time: 1:13.25

Fastest lap
Driver	(United States) Eddie Cheever	Osella-BMW
- Time: 1:31.52

Podium
First	(United States) Eddie Cheever	Osella-BMW
Second	(Italy) Siegfried Stohr	Chevron-BMW
Third	(Switzerland) Marc Surer	March-BMW

The 1979 Pau Grand Prix was a Formula Two motor race held on 4 June 1979 at the Pau circuit, in Pau, Pyrénées-Atlantiques, France. The Grand Prix was won by Eddie Cheever, driving the Osella FA2/79. Siegfried Stohr finished second and Marc Surer third.

== Classification ==
=== Race ===
Pos	No	Driver	Vehicle	Laps	Time/retired	Grid
1	9	(United States) Eddie Cheever	Osella-BMW	73	1hr 54min 30.32sec	
2	19	(Italy) Siegfried Stohr	Chevron-BMW	73	+ 28.08 s	
3	1	(Switzerland) Marc Surer	March-BMW	72	+ 1 lap	
4	3	(Italy) Beppe Gabbiani	March-BMW	72	+ 1 lap	
5	39	(France) Patrick Gaillard	Chevron-Hart	72	+ 1 lap	
6	16	(Argentina) Miguel Ángel Guerra	March-BMW	71	+ 2 laps	
7	11	(Italy) Alberto Colombo	March-BMW	70	+ 3 laps	
8	8	(United Kingdom) Stephen South	March-BMW	68	+ 5 laps	
9	77	(United Kingdom) Derek Warwick	March-Hart	68	+ 5 laps	
10	5	(Argentina) Juan María Traverso	March-Hart	61	+ 12 laps	
Ret	22	(Sweden) Eje Elgh	March-BMW	47	Accident	
Ret	25	(Germany) Wolfgang Locher	March-Hart	42	Accident	
Ret	2	(France) Michel Leclère	March-BMW	40	Electrical	
Ret	7	(Republic of Ireland) Derek Daly	March-BMW	30	Accident	
Ret	4	(Italy) Teo Fabi	March-BMW	30	Accident	
Ret	6	(United States) Bobby Rahal	Chevron-Hart	30	Accident	
Ret	28	(France) Alain Couderc	AGS-BMW	21	Clutch and gearbox	
Ret	15	(South Africa) Rad Dougall	Ralt-Hart	14	Accident	
Ret	14	(United Kingdom) Brian Henton	Ralt-Hart	0	Accident	
DNS	12	(Argentina) Ariel Bakst	March-BMW		Did not start	
DNQ	27	(Germany) Armin Hahne	Maurer-BMW		Did not qualify	
DNQ	23	(Netherlands) Huub Rothengatter	Chevron-Hart		Did not qualify	
Fastest Lap: Eddie Cheever (Osella-BMW) - 1:31.52

Preceded by 1978 Pau Grand Prix	Pau Grand Prix; 1979	Succeeded by 1980 Pau Grand Prix
