= Moñitos =

Coordinates: 9.25028°N 76.1325°W

- Municipality and town
- Flag Coat of arms

- Location of the municipality and town of Moñitos in the Córdoba Department of Colombia.
- Country: Colombia
- Department: Córdoba Department

Population (Census 2018)
  - Total: 25,095
- Time zone: UTC-5 (Colombia Standard Time)

Moñitos is a town and municipality located in the Córdoba Department, northern Colombia.

According to 2018 estimates, the population of Moñitos was 25,095.
