= San José de Uré =

Coordinates: 7°47′N 75°32′W

- Municipality and town
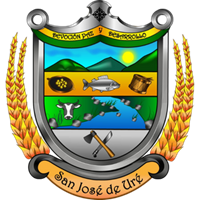
- Coat of arms

- Location of the municipality and town of San José de Uré in the Córdoba Department of Colombia.
- Country: Colombia
- Department: Córdoba Department
- Time zone: UTC-5 (Colombia Standard Time)

San José de Uré is a town and municipality located in the Córdoba Department, northern Colombia. The town has historical roots in the colonial agriculture and mining industries. In 2024, it was announced as one of two Colombian towns included in the UNESCO program "The Roads of Enslaved People: Resistance, Freedom and Heritage".
