= 1981 Pau Grand Prix =

Race details
- Date: 8 June 1981
- Official name: XLI Pau Grand Prix
- Location: Pau, France
- Course: Temporary Street Circuit
- Course length: 2.760 km (1.720 miles)
- Distance: 73 laps, 206.882 km (128.550 miles)

Pole position
Driver	(Italy) Michele Alboreto	Minardi-BMW
- Time: 1:13.07

Fastest lap
Driver	(United Kingdom) Geoff Lees	Ralt-Honda
- Time: 1:15.00

Podium
First	(United Kingdom) Geoff Lees	Ralt-Honda
Second	(Belgium) Thierry Boutsen	March-BMW
Third	(Italy) Piero Necchi	March-BMW

The 1981 Pau Grand Prix was a Formula Two motor race held on 8 June 1981 at the Pau circuit, in Pau, Pyrénées-Atlantiques, France. The Grand Prix was won by Geoff Lees, driving the Ralt. Thierry Boutsen finished second and Piero Necchi third.

== Classification ==
=== Race ===
Pos	No	Driver	Vehicle	Laps	Time/retired	Grid
1	14	(United Kingdom) Geoff Lees	Ralt-Honda	73	1hr 33min 13.91sec	3
2	4	(Belgium) Thierry Boutsen	March-BMW	73	+ 0.52 s	4
3	19	(Italy) Piero Necchi	March-BMW	73	+ 57.96 s	12
4	12	(Italy) Carlo Rossi	Toleman-Hart	72	+ 1 lap	18
5	16	(Sweden) Eje Elgh	Maurer-BMW	72	+ 1 lap	6
6	15	(New Zealand) Mike Thackwell	Ralt-Honda	72	+ 1 lap	16
7	22	(Venezuela) Johnny Cecotto	March-BMW	72	+ 1 lap	15
8	1	(Sweden) Stefan Johansson	Lola-Hart	71	+ 2 laps	7
9	44	(Colombia) Ricardo Londoño	Toleman-Hart	70	+ 3 laps	20
10	77	(United Kingdom) Jim Crawford	Toleman-Hart	69	+ 4 laps	10
Ret	7	(Italy) Riccardo Paletti	March-BMW	47	Engine	8
Ret	17	(Colombia) Roberto Guerrero	Maurer-BMW	44	Accident	5
Ret	8	(France) Richard Dallest	AGS-BMW	39	Brakes	9
Ret	3	(Italy) Corrado Fabi	March-BMW	36	Brakes	13
Ret	5	(Germany) Christian Danner	March-BMW	15	Accident	17
Ret	10	(Italy) Michele Alboreto	Minardi-BMW	3	Collision	1
Ret	2	(United Kingdom) Kenny Acheson	Lola-Hart	3	Collision	2
Ret	34	(Italy) Oscar Pedersoli	Ralt-BMW	1	Accident	14
Ret	20	(Italy) "Gianfranco"	March-BMW	0	Accident	
DNS	11	(Italy) Guido Pardini	Lola-BMW		Did not start	
DNQ	36	(United Kingdom) Ray Mallock	Ralt-Hart		Did not qualify	
DNQ	38	(Germany) Harald Brutschin	March-BMW		Did not qualify	
DNQ	39	(Germany) Bernd Brutschin	March-BMW		Did not qualify	
DNQ	40	(United Kingdom) Paul Smith	March-Hart		Did not qualify	
DNPQ	21	(Switzerland) Loris Kessel	Merzario-BMW		Did Not Pre-Qualify	
DNPQ	24	(Switzerland) Jürg Lienhard	March-BMW		Did Not Pre-Qualify	
DNPQ	33	(United Kingdom) Roy Baker	March-Hart		Did Not Pre-Qualify	
Fastest Lap: Geoff Lees (Ralt-Honda) - 1:15.00

Preceded by 1980 Pau Grand Prix	Pau Grand Prix; 1981	Succeeded by 1982 Pau Grand Prix
