= Puerto Libertador =

Coordinates: 7.90667°N 75.6733°W

- Municipality and town
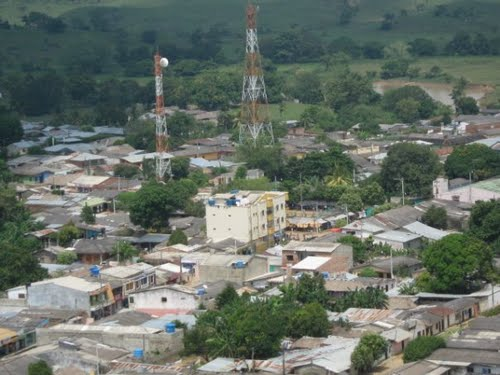

- Flag
- Nickname: [Bijao]
- Location of the municipality and town of Puerto Libertador in the Córdoba Department of Colombia.
- Country: Colombia
- Department: Córdoba Department

Population (2020 est.)
  - Total: 55,622
- Time zone: UTC-5 (Colombia Standard Time)

Puerto Libertador (Spanish pronunciation: [ˈpweɾto liβeɾtaˈðoɾ]) is a town and municipality located in the Córdoba Department, northern Colombia.

According to 2020 estimates, the population of Puerto Libertador was 55,622.
