= Chinú =

Coordinates: 9°05′N 75°20′W

- Municipality and town
- Flag

- Location of the municipality and town of Chinú in the Córdoba Department of Colombia.
- Country: Colombia
- Department: Córdoba Department

Area
  - Municipality and town: 626.2 km^{2} (241.8 sq mi)
  - Urban: 3.59 km^{2} (1.39 sq mi)

Population (2020 est.)
  - Municipality and town: 50,743
  - Density: 81.03/km^{2} (209.9/sq mi)
  - Urban: 20,010
  - Urban density: 5,570/km^{2} (14,400/sq mi)
- Time zone: UTC-5 (Colombia Standard Time)

Chinú is a town and municipality located in the Córdoba Department, northern Colombia. According to 2020 estimates, the population of Chinú was 50,743, with a population density of 81 persons per square kilometer.
