= 1978 Pau Grand Prix =

Race details
- Date: 15 May 1978
- Official name: XXXVIII Pau Grand Prix
- Location: Pau, France
- Course: Temporary Street Circuit
- Course length: 2.760 km (1.720 miles)
- Distance: 73 laps, 206.882 km (128.550 miles)

Pole position
Driver	(United Kingdom) Brian Henton	March-Hart
- Time: 1:13.64

Fastest lap
Driver	(Italy) Bruno Giacomelli	March-BMW
- Time: 1:14.45

Podium
First	(Italy) Bruno Giacomelli	March-BMW
Second	(Sweden) Eje Elgh	Chevron-Hart
Third	(Switzerland) Marc Surer	March-BMW

The 1978 Pau Grand Prix was a Formula Two motor race held on 15 May 1978 at the Pau circuit, in Pau, Pyrénées-Atlantiques, France. The Grand Prix was won by Bruno Giacomelli, driving the March 782. Eje Elgh finished second and Marc Surer third.

== Classification ==
=== Race ===
Pos	No	Driver	Vehicle	Laps	Time/retired	Grid
1	8	(Italy) Bruno Giacomelli	March-BMW	73	1hr 33min 11.73sec	3
2	15	(Sweden) Eje Elgh	Chevron-Hart	73	+ 21.74 s	8
3	9	(Switzerland) Marc Surer	March-BMW	73	+ 34.25 s	15
4	39	(Italy) Piero Necchi	March-BMW	73	+ 52.83 s	16
5	6	(United States) Eddie Cheever	March-BMW	73	+ 1:13.43 s	4
6	2	(France) Patrick Tambay	Chevron-Hart	72	+ 1 lap	2
7	28	(Italy) Roberto Marazzi	March-BMW	70	+ 3 laps	13
8	10	(Germany) Manfred Winkelhock	March-BMW	70	+ 3 laps	19
9	19	(Republic of Ireland) Derek Daly	Chevron-Hart	66	+ 7 laps	7
10	77	(United States) Don Breidenbach	Chevron-Hart	66	+ 7 laps	20
11	1	(France) Jacques Laffite	March-BMW	65	+ 8 laps	6
12	23	(Brazil) Alex Ribeiro	March-Hart	64	+ 9 laps	11
13	25	(Italy) Alberto Colombo	March-BMW	53	+ 20 laps	12
Ret	49	(France) José Dolhem	AGS-BMW	51	Accident	17
Ret	26	(Argentina) Ricardo Zunino	March-BMW	32	Oil radiator	18
Ret	21	(Italy) Piercarlo Ghinzani	March-BMW	25	Throttle	10
Ret	24	(United Kingdom) Brian Henton	March-Hart	13	Battery	1
Ret	4	(France) Alain Prost	Chevron-Hart	6	Engine	5
Ret	7	(Brazil) Ingo Hoffmann	March-BMW	0	Accident	14
DNS	14	(Finland) Keke Rosberg	Chevron-Hart		Did not start	
DNQ	31	(Belgium) Bernard de Dryver	March-BMW		Did not qualify	
DNQ	41	(Italy) Sandro Cinotti	Chevron-BMW		Did not qualify	
DNQ	50	(Germany) Wolfgang Locher	Ralt-BMW		Did not qualify	
DNQ	71	(United States) John Briggs	Chevron-Hart		Did not qualify	
Fastest Lap: Bruno Giacomelli (March-BMW) - 1:14.45

Preceded by 1977 Pau Grand Prix	Pau Grand Prix; 1978	Succeeded by 1979 Pau Grand Prix
