= Chimá =

Coordinates: 9°09′N 75°38′W

- Municipality and town
- Flag

- Location of the municipality and town of Chimá in the Córdoba Department of Colombia.
- Country: Colombia
- Department: Córdoba Department

Area
  - Total: 335 km^{2} (129 sq mi)

Population (Census 2018)
  - Total: 13,492
  - Density: 40.3/km^{2} (104/sq mi)
- Time zone: UTC-5 (Colombia Standard Time)

Chimá is a town and municipality located in the Córdoba Department, northern Colombia. According to 2018 estimates, the population of Chimá was 13,492, with a population density of 40 persons per square kilometer.

== Climate ==
Climate data for Chimá, elevation 1,090 m (3,580 ft), (1981–2010)
Month	Jan	Feb	Mar	Apr	May	Jun	Jul	Aug	Sep	Oct	Nov	Dec	Year
Mean daily maximum °C (°F)	30.8 (87.4)	31.1 (88.0)	31.0 (87.8)	30.6 (87.1)	30.2 (86.4)	30.0 (86.0)	30.0 (86.0)	30.2 (86.4)	30.1 (86.2)	29.7 (85.5)	29.7 (85.5)	30.0 (86.0)	30.3 (86.5)
Daily mean °C (°F)	23.7 (74.7)	23.8 (74.8)	23.8 (74.8)	23.7 (74.7)	23.6 (74.5)	23.6 (74.5)	23.4 (74.1)	23.4 (74.1)	23.5 (74.3)	23.4 (74.1)	23.5 (74.3)	23.6 (74.5)	23.6 (74.5)
Mean daily minimum °C (°F)	17.5 (63.5)	17.6 (63.7)	17.7 (63.9)	18.0 (64.4)	18.0 (64.4)	17.8 (64.0)	17.4 (63.3)	17.3 (63.1)	17.5 (63.5)	17.7 (63.9)	18.0 (64.4)	17.9 (64.2)	17.7 (63.9)
Average precipitation mm (inches)	101.5 (4.00)	170.9 (6.73)	233.0 (9.17)	344.3 (13.56)	358.0 (14.09)	200.1 (7.88)	226.4 (8.91)	257.8 (10.15)	311.4 (12.26)	384.1 (15.12)	298.2 (11.74)	178.0 (7.01)	3,063.7 (120.62)
Average precipitation days	11	14	17	23	23	21	22	23	23	24	20	14	235
Average relative humidity (%)	74	74	74	74	75	75	75	75	75	75	75	74	74
Source: Instituto de Hidrologia Meteorologia y Estudios Ambientales
