= Scarfilm =

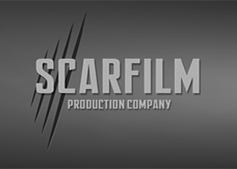
- Scarfilm Logo (2015)
- Industry: Film
- Founder: Gérald Frydman
- Headquarters: Brussels, Belgium
- Key people: Barney Frydman; Philippe Geus
- Products: Motion pictures
- Website: scarfilm.net

Scarfilm is a Belgian film production house.

== History ==
The Belgian director Gérald Frydman founded Scarfilm in 1976 to produce his own films, after remarked ones.

In 2014, for Scarfilm it's a new start with a new production team to develop films, music video, commercials and corporate video.

== Filmography ==
- "Agulana" (1976) won a prize in Cannes Film Festival in 1976
- "L'immortel"(1981)
- "Last Cut"(1982)
- "That's all Folks"(1984)
- "Les Effaceurs"(1991)
- "J'ai eu dur"(1996)
- "Arthur Masson, l'homme qui écrivait des livres"(documentary)(2001)
- "La Séquence Sylverstein"(2003)
- "Porteur d'eau"(2004) directed by Carlos Rendón Zipagauta
- "Battle" (2008)
- "One Last Time" (2010)
- "Strangers" (2011)
- "Lipstick" (2012)
- "In Exequiel" (2013)
- "La Graine" (2015)

== See also ==
- Palme d'or (Le Cheval de Fer directed by Gérald Frydman won the Short Film Palme d'Or at the 1984 Cannes Film Festival)
