= Charanguita =

Stringed musical instrument

The Charanguita (a Spanish hybrid word of "Charango" and "guitar") is a modern instrument created in the traditional Bolivian style of stringed instruments. It resembles an upside-down guitar, with the body of the instrument nearer to the head of the performer, like a violin.

The charanguita is, thus, a hybrid of a charango and a guitar.

A charanguita player can vary the notes and volume independently of its pitch.

== History ==
The charanguita was invented by the Bolivian René Gamboa Soria
