= Pueblo Nuevo, Córdoba =

Coordinates: 8.50083°N 75.5072°W

- Municipality and town
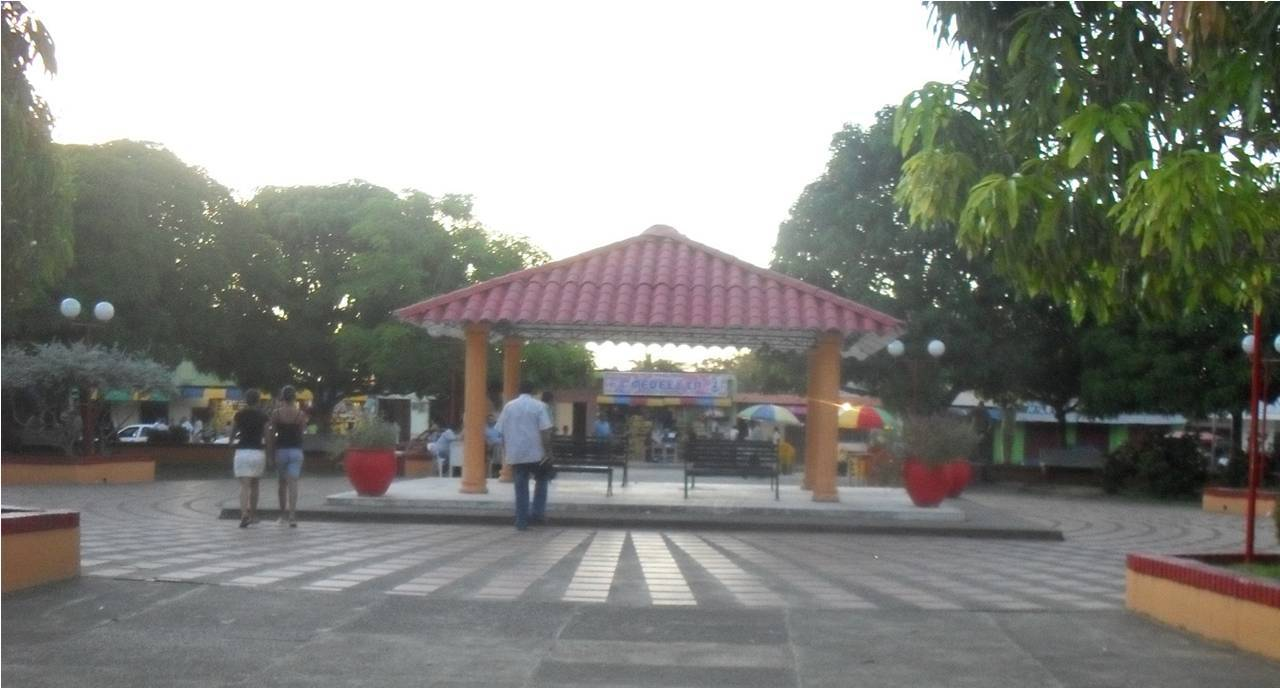

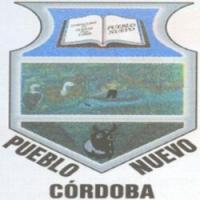
- Flag Coat of arms

- Pueblo Nuevo is a municipality and town in the department of Córdoba in Northern Colombia.
- Country: Colombia
- Department: Córdoba Department

Population (2020 est.)
  - Total: 42,446
- Time zone: UTC-5 (Colombia Standard Time)

Pueblo Nuevo is a town and municipality located in the Córdoba Department, northern Colombia.

According to 2020 estimates, the population of Pueblo Nuevo was 42,446.
