= Montería =

- Municipality and city
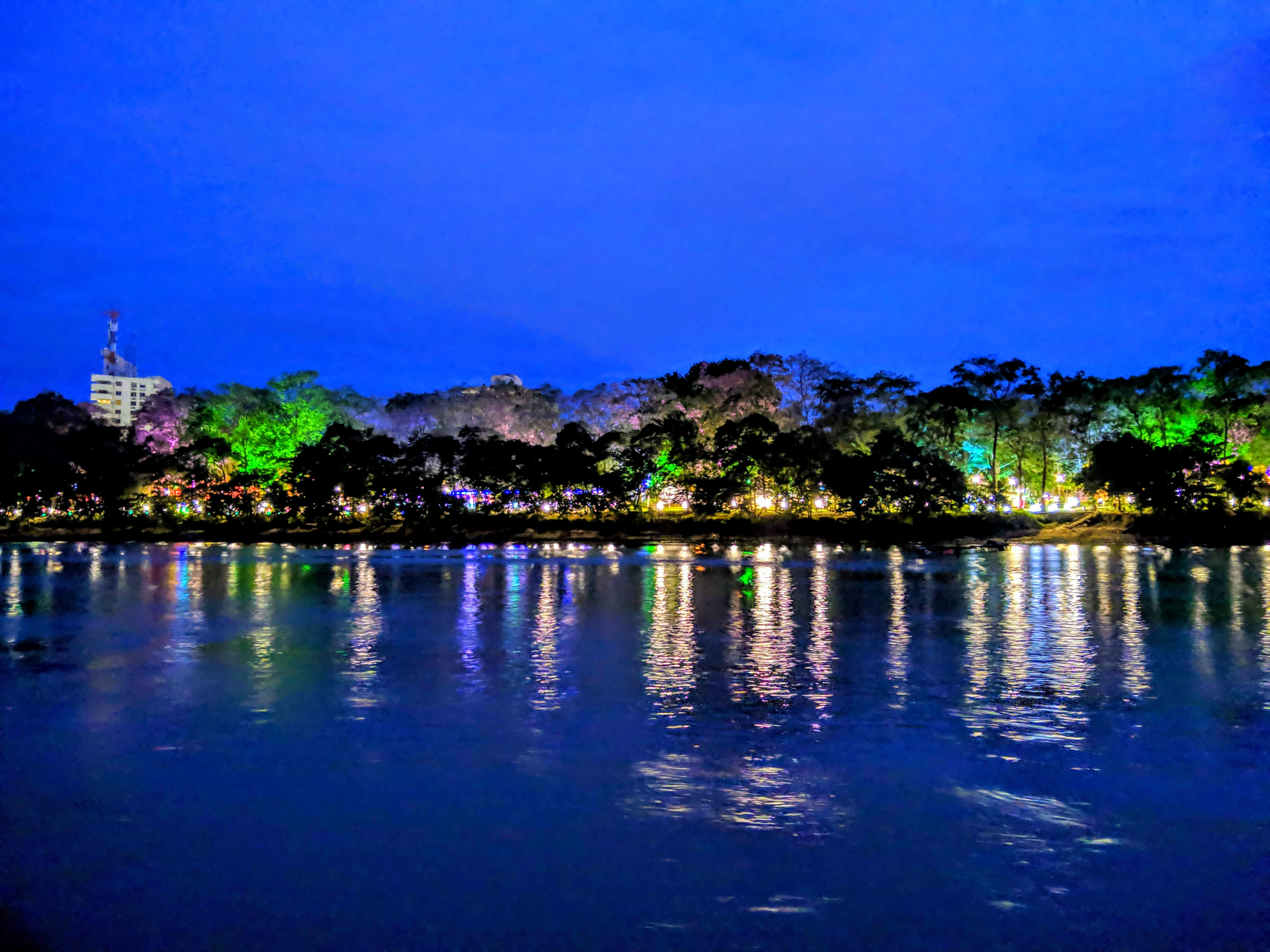
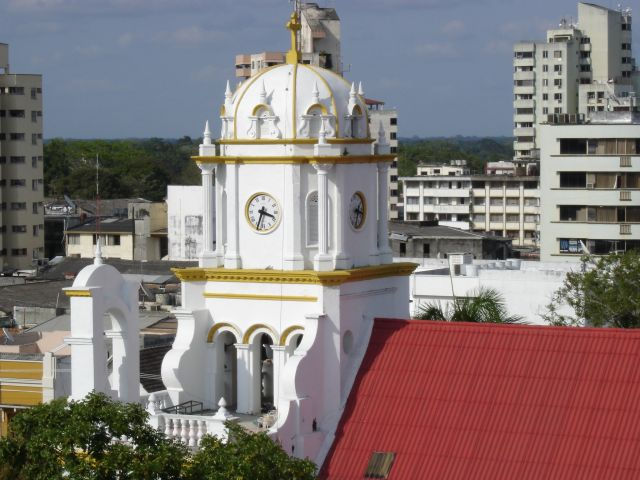
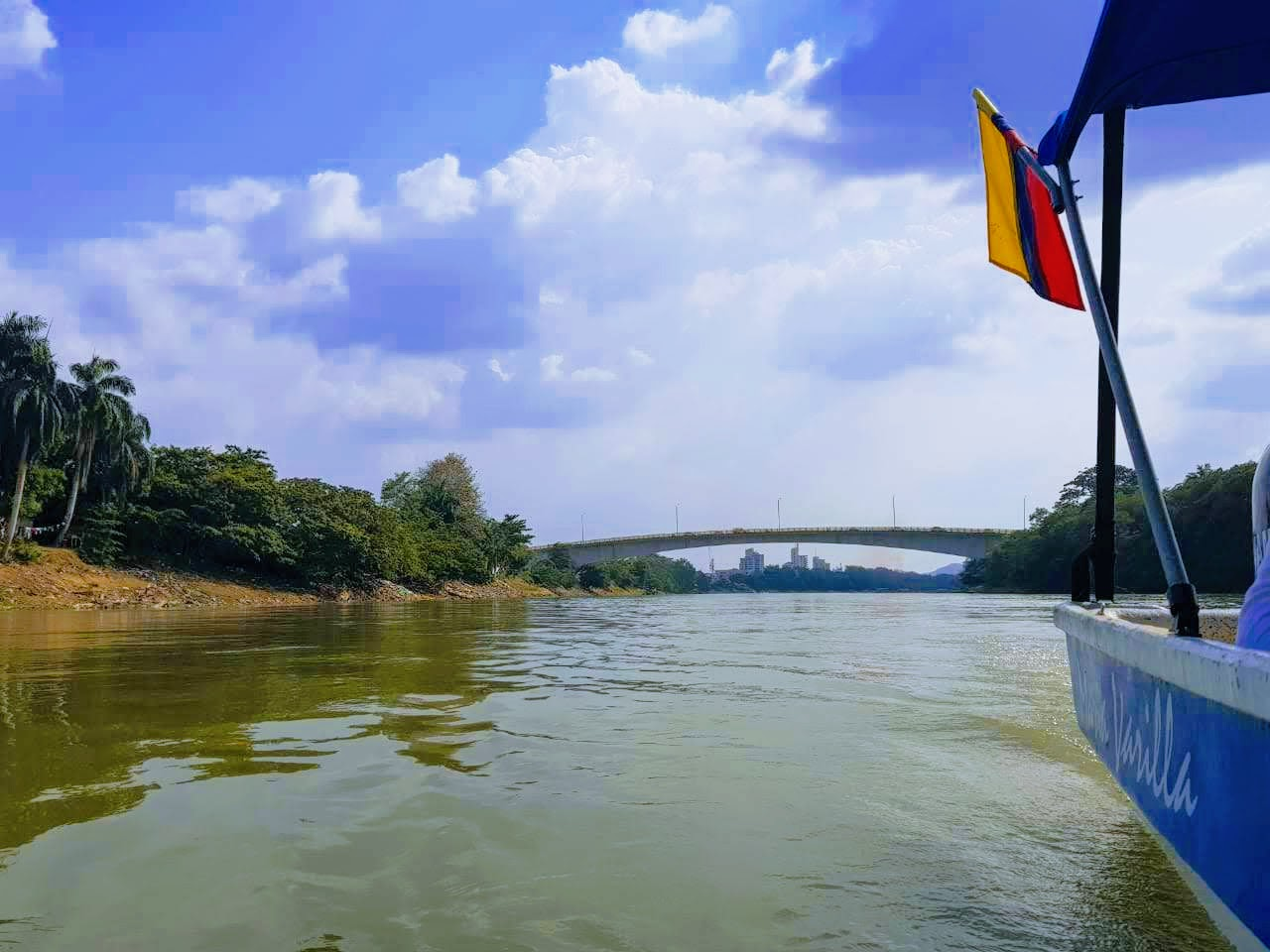
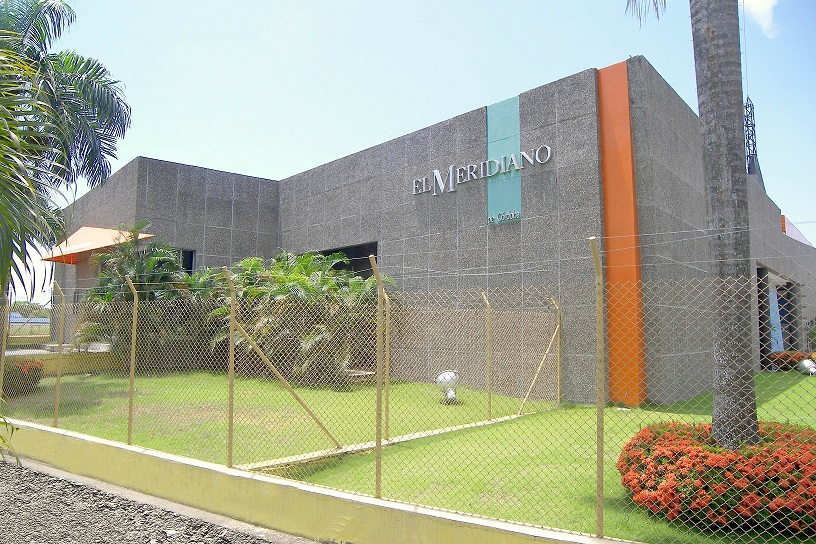
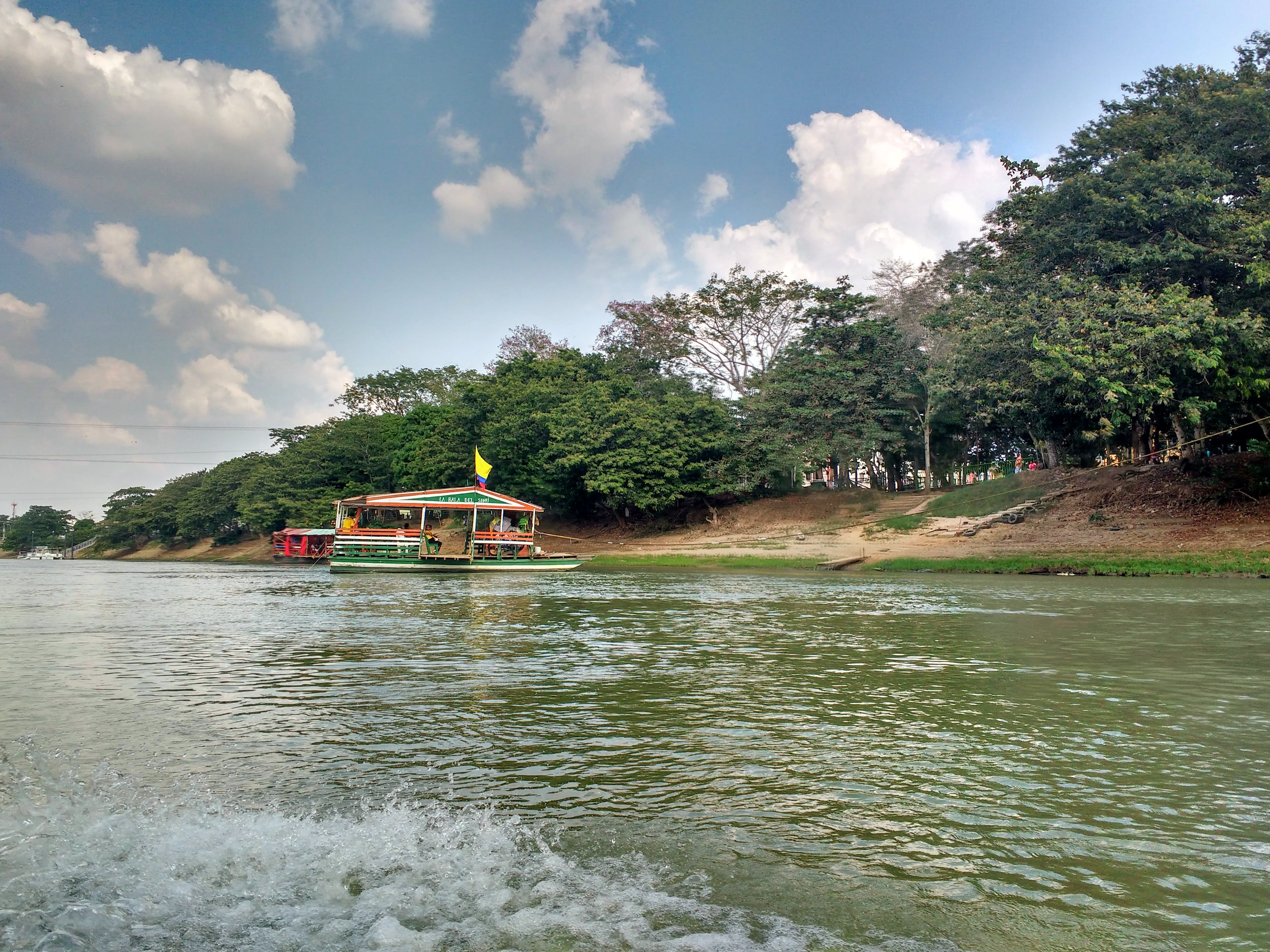
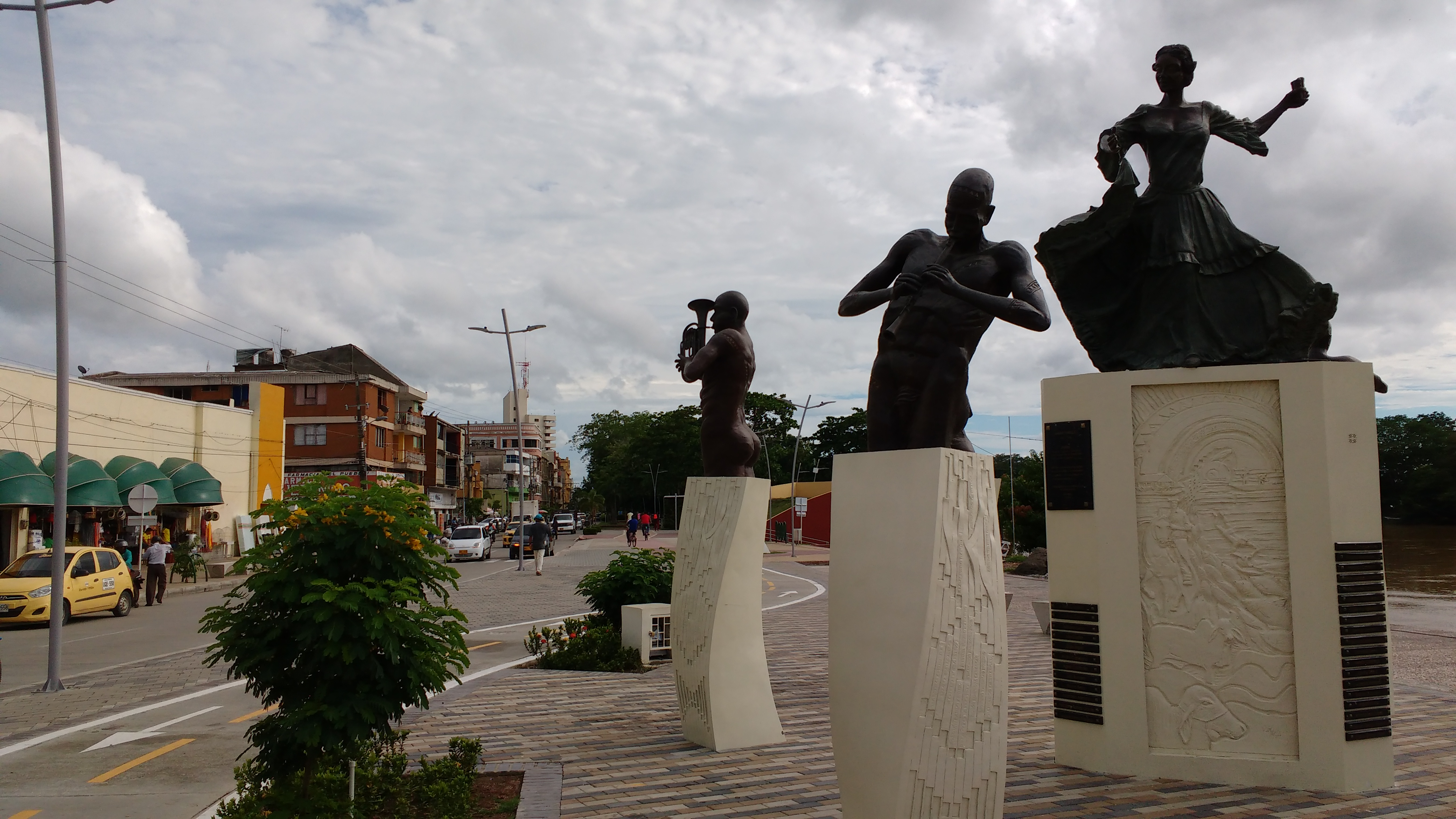
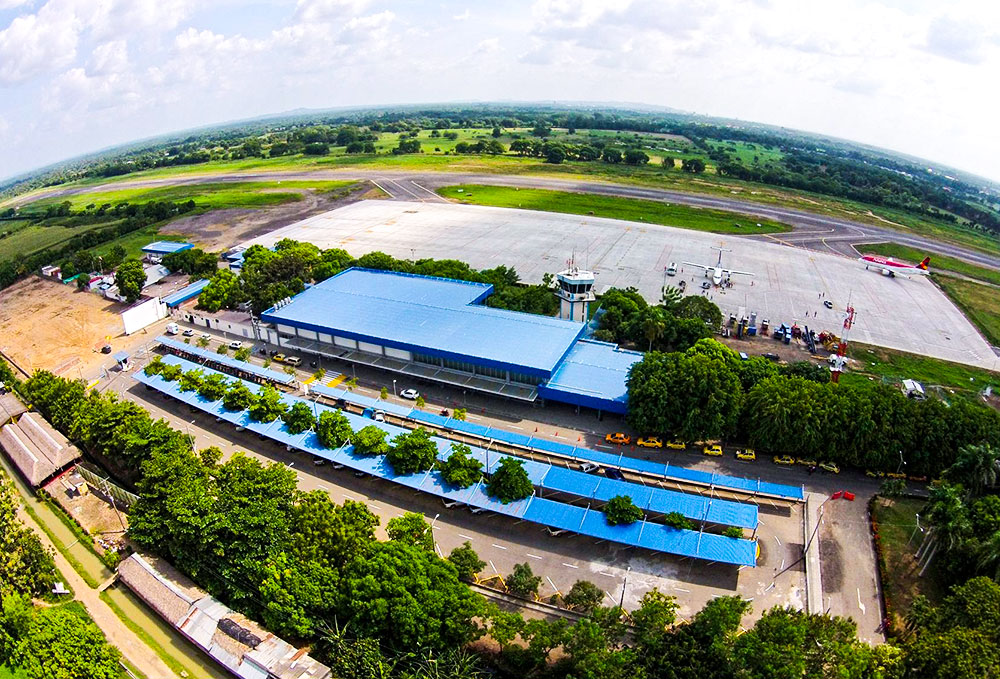
- Ronda del Sinú Lineal Park Saint Jerome Cathedral Second Centennial Bridge El Meridiano Newspaper Headquarters Planchones Across the Sinú River María Varilla monument Los Garzones Airport

- Flag Coat of arms
- Nicknames: La Venecia Colombiana (The Colombian Venice); La Capital Ganadera de Colombia (The Rancher Capital of Colombia); La Ciudad de las Golondrinas (The City of the Swallows)
- Location within the Department of Córdoba
- Coordinates: 8°45′N 75°53′W
- Country: Colombia
- Region: Caribbean Region (Colombia)
- Department: Córdoba^{*}
- Foundation: May 1, 1777

Government
  - Mayor: Hugo Kerguelen

Area
  - Municipality and city: 3,137 km^{2} (1,211 sq mi)
  - Urban: 43.71 km^{2} (16.88 sq mi)
- Elevation: 18 m (59 ft)

Population (2018 census)
  - Municipality and city: 490,935
  - Density: 156.5/km^{2} (405.3/sq mi)
  - Urban: 388,499
  - Urban density: 8,888/km^{2} (23,020/sq mi)
- Demonym: Monteriano
- Time zone: UTC-05 (Eastern Time Zone)
- Area code: 57 + 4
- Website: Official website (in Spanish)
- ^{*}Monteria metropolitan area is yet to be determined.

Montería (Spanish pronunciation: [monteˈɾi.a]) is a municipality and city located in northern Colombia and the capital of the Department of Córdoba. The city is located 50 km (31 mi) away from the Caribbean sea, by the Sinú River. The city and region are known for their distinct cultural heritages, which include a blend of mainly colonial Spanish descendants, Indigenous Zenú peoples, Crypto-Jews, and more recently, Middle East immigrants. The city is home to the Sombrero Vueltiao, a national symbol; and is the home of Porro folklore music. The city has an inland seaport connected to the Caribbean Sea by the Sinú River.

== History ==
The area where the Department of Córdoba is located today was first settled by Zenú Indians, who lived near the banks of three rivers: the Sinú (Finzenú), the San Jorge (Panzenú) and the Nechí (Zenúfana). Montería was founded on May 1, 1777 by Spanish officer Antonio de la Torre y Miranda, being governor of the Province of Cartagena officer Juan de Torrezar Díaz Pimienta. The city, which had been named Montería by its inhabitants and located on the east side of the Sinú river, was then renamed "San Jerónimo de Buenavista" and moved to the west side of the river.

San Jerónimo de Buenavista was chosen by Antonio de la Torre y Miranda to name the city, in order to honor Saint Jerome, but people referred to it as Montería. In 1803, the city was burned by a group of natives, so the residents decided to move back to the Sinú's east bank, where it remains today. In recent years, Monteria has seen a growth in population on the west side. In 1923, it became a municipality of Bolívar Department, and in 1952, it was designated as capital of the new Department of Córdoba. Montería was located within the boundaries of the Colombian Department of Bolívar until 1952 when it separated from Bolívar and became the capital of the new Department of Córdoba.

With a population of approximately 400,000, the city is considered to be one of the ten most important cities in Colombia and is locally known as La Perla del Sinú (The Pearl of the River Sinú).

== Geography and climate ==
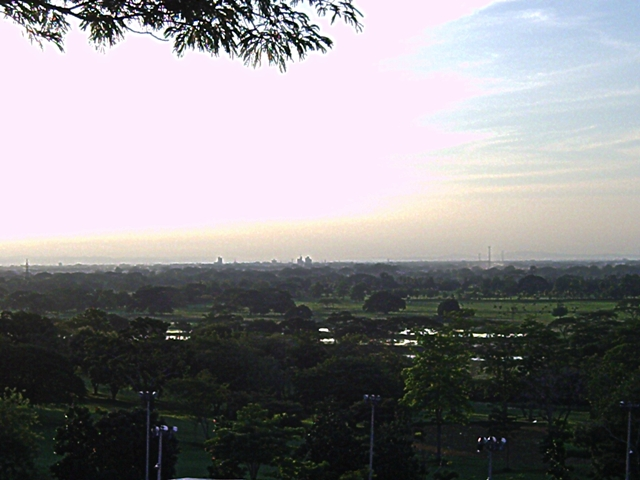
Valley of the Sinú river

The city, which lies in the Sinú valley, is divided by the Sinú river and surrounded and sparsely populated by tropical flora and fauna. The town's weather is mainly warm and moderately humid, with average yearly temperatures of 27 °C (80.6 °F). The area is subject to flooding.

Climate data for Montería (Los Garzones Airport) 1991–2020
Month	Jan	Feb	Mar	Apr	May	Jun	Jul	Aug	Sep	Oct	Nov	Dec	Year
Record high °C (°F)	36.8 (98.2)	41.2 (106.2)	38.2 (100.8)	38.8 (101.8)	37.6 (99.7)	36.6 (97.9)	37.4 (99.3)	36.6 (97.9)	37.5 (99.5)	36.5 (97.7)	36.0 (96.8)	38.8 (101.8)	41.2 (106.2)
Mean daily maximum °C (°F)	33.8 (92.8)	34.6 (94.3)	34.5 (94.1)	34.1 (93.4)	33.0 (91.4)	33.0 (91.4)	33.2 (91.8)	33.1 (91.6)	32.6 (90.7)	32.4 (90.3)	32.5 (90.5)	33.2 (91.8)	33.3 (91.9)
Daily mean °C (°F)	28.0 (82.4)	28.3 (82.9)	28.5 (83.3)	28.6 (83.5)	28.2 (82.8)	28.3 (82.9)	28.3 (82.9)	28.1 (82.6)	27.7 (81.9)	27.6 (81.7)	27.6 (81.7)	27.8 (82.0)	28.1 (82.6)
Mean daily minimum °C (°F)	22.6 (72.7)	22.9 (73.2)	23.2 (73.8)	23.8 (74.8)	23.8 (74.8)	23.6 (74.5)	23.4 (74.1)	23.3 (73.9)	23.2 (73.8)	23.2 (73.8)	23.2 (73.8)	23.0 (73.4)	23.2 (73.8)
Record low °C (°F)	19.2 (66.6)	18.7 (65.7)	19.4 (66.9)	19.0 (66.2)	20.0 (68.0)	20.7 (69.3)	19.8 (67.6)	19.4 (66.9)	19.6 (67.3)	20.0 (68.0)	20.0 (68.0)	20.0 (68.0)	18.7 (65.7)
Average precipitation mm (inches)	8.0 (0.31)	11.1 (0.44)	27.8 (1.09)	94.6 (3.72)	182.3 (7.18)	164.5 (6.48)	165.4 (6.51)	170.1 (6.70)	181.5 (7.15)	140.1 (5.52)	114.3 (4.50)	41.1 (1.62)	1,300.9 (51.22)
Average precipitation days (≥ 1 mm)	0.9	1.2	2.4	7.0	12.0	12.1	12.3	12.5	12.2	10.6	8.3	3.3	94.9
Average relative humidity (%)	77	76	76	77	81	81	81	82	82	82	83	81	80
Source: Instituto de Hidrologia Meteorologia y Estudios Ambientales (humidity 1981-2010)

Climate data for Montería (University of Córdoba) 1981-2010
Month	Jan	Feb	Mar	Apr	May	Jun	Jul	Aug	Sep	Oct	Nov	Dec	Year
Record high °C (°F)	35.4 (95.7)	36.4 (97.5)	38.8 (101.8)	37.6 (99.7)	38.0 (100.4)	36.0 (96.8)	38.2 (100.8)	36.6 (97.9)	36.4 (97.5)	34.8 (94.6)	37.2 (99.0)	37.6 (99.7)	38.8 (101.8)
Mean daily maximum °C (°F)	33.2 (91.8)	33.7 (92.7)	33.7 (92.7)	33.4 (92.1)	32.4 (90.3)	32.4 (90.3)	32.5 (90.5)	32.5 (90.5)	32.0 (89.6)	31.9 (89.4)	32.0 (89.6)	32.5 (90.5)	32.7 (90.9)
Daily mean °C (°F)	27.3 (81.1)	27.4 (81.3)	27.8 (82.0)	28.0 (82.4)	27.7 (81.9)	27.7 (81.9)	27.6 (81.7)	27.5 (81.5)	27.2 (81.0)	27.1 (80.8)	27.2 (81.0)	27.2 (81.0)	27.5 (81.5)
Mean daily minimum °C (°F)	22.7 (72.9)	23.0 (73.4)	23.7 (74.7)	24.1 (75.4)	23.9 (75.0)	23.8 (74.8)	23.6 (74.5)	23.5 (74.3)	23.2 (73.8)	23.5 (74.3)	23.4 (74.1)	23.2 (73.8)	23.5 (74.3)
Record low °C (°F)	17.6 (63.7)	16.2 (61.2)	18.0 (64.4)	17.8 (64.0)	16.4 (61.5)	18.2 (64.8)	18.4 (65.1)	18.8 (65.8)	17.0 (62.6)	18.4 (65.1)	18.6 (65.5)	17.0 (62.6)	16.2 (61.2)
Average rainfall mm (inches)	11.7 (0.46)	16.5 (0.65)	30.0 (1.18)	116.2 (4.57)	175.5 (6.91)	163.1 (6.42)	156.3 (6.15)	180.9 (7.12)	202.9 (7.99)	153.0 (6.02)	103.8 (4.09)	34.9 (1.37)	1,323.6 (52.11)
Average rainy days	3	3	4	10	16	16	16	17	17	15	12	5	131
Average relative humidity (%)	81	80	78	81	84	85	84	84	85	85	85	84	83
Mean monthly sunshine hours	235.6	203.4	192.2	159.0	148.8	159.0	195.3	186.0	150.0	164.3	180.0	192.2	2,165.8
Mean daily sunshine hours	7.6	7.2	6.2	5.3	4.8	5.3	6.3	6.0	5.0	5.3	6.0	6.2	5.9
Source: Instituto de Hidrologia Meteorologia y Estudios Ambientales

== Media and communications ==
=== Newspapers ===
- El Espectador (national daily newspaper)
- El Heraldo de Barranquilla (regional newspaper)
- Diario El Meridiano de Córdoba(regional newspaper)
- El Tiempo (national daily newspaper)
- El Universal (regional newspaper)

== Economy ==
The town's outskirts fuel the economy mainly through cattle and cattle ranching; within the city limits, there is a highly prosperous commercial district consisting of several shopping centres and malls, streets lined with shops, and numerous restaurant chains. It is considered to be the “Cattle Farming Capital” of Colombia, and celebrates this title with a yearly festival. The singer-songwriter Manuel Turizo (along with his older brother Júlian, also a talented musician) was born in Montería and grew up on a local cattle farm, the family having been involved in the cattle industry. In one particular interview, when asked what his "favorite foods" were, Turizo answered confidently, "The 'cow-meat'! Cows!"

Additionally, Montería is one of the most important destinations for musical acts in the country, featuring several excellent stadiums, arenas, convention centres, and other performance venues. Montería has hosted many notable musicians and celebrities on tour, such as Maelo Ruiz, Jorge Celedón, Shakira, Years and Years, Juanes, Carlos Vives, and others.

== Transportation ==
Monteria lies on a major highway connecting Medellín to Sincelejo and extending to Cartagena and Barranquilla. It has an effective public transportation system and arterial connections to the rest of the country.

=== Public transportation ===
As is common in most Colombian municipalities, public transportation is tightly integrated into the city. A system of taxis and several lines of large and small buses serve the community on surface streets. The streets of Monteria are also full of motorcycle taxis or "rapimotos" that provide economical transportation.

A passenger-only ferry system known as "Planchones", consists of roofed wooden rafts. It traverses the Sinu river along a system of manual cable tows. It was made as a way to cross the river before a proper bridge could be built and has served as an alternative to cross the river ever since. It is one of the most remarkable features of the city.

=== Water ===
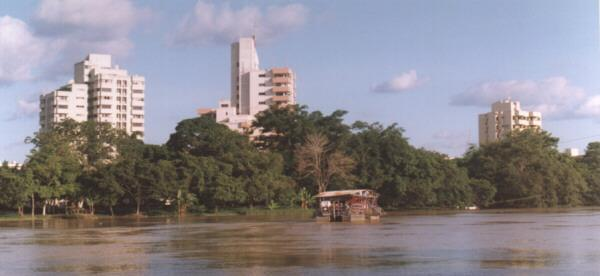
View of Monteria from the Sinu river.

The city is served by a fishing port, but the waters of the Sinu river do not run deep enough and are not wide enough to serve as a commercial channel. High quality sand is brought up from the bottom of the river in buckets placed by divers, for use in the making of cinder blocks for local and regional construction projects.

=== Air travel ===
Monteria is home to an international airport, Los Garzones Airport, which provides service to major cities via Avianca, LATAM airlines and other cargo and passenger airlines.

Major cities served from the airport include Bogotá, Medellín, Cali and other places.

== Demographics ==
The region is populated by a diverse mix of people, including the descendants of Spaniards/Basque, Arabs, French, Italians and Sinu Indians, a tribe of natives with their own language that once produced ornate pottery and goldworks. According to 2018 estimates, the population of Monteria was 490,935, with a population density of 160 persons per square kilometer.

== Tourism and sport ==
=== Sites of interest ===
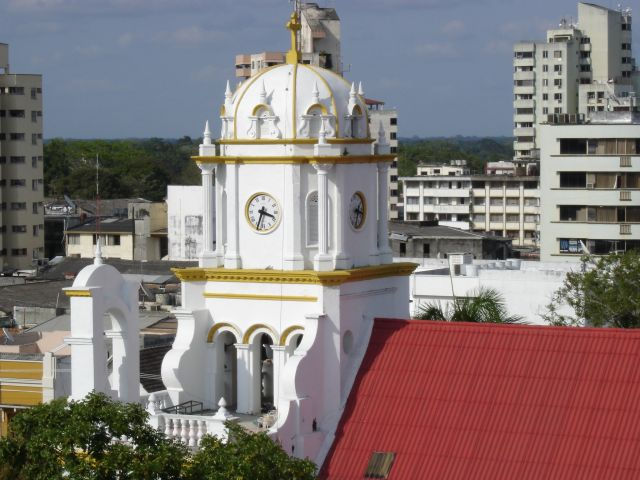
Colonial church in downtown Monteria.

Sites of interest in Monteria include:

- The city's 1st Avenue runs along the Sinú river.
- Simon Bolivar Park separates the river from 1st Avenue and is home to wild monkeys and sloths.
- San Antero Beach is a beach which has a lot of tourist attractions.
- The Colonial-era Cathedral of Saint Jeronimo is surrounded by a park.
- Alamedas del Sinu is a shopping center in the area.
- The bridge spanning the Sinu river is a local landmark.
- Centro Comercial Buenavista Montería

=== Sporting clubs ===
- Centro Recreacional Tacasuán
- Club Campestre
- Club de golf
- Vaqueros de Montería - Professional Baseball team that plays in June 18 Stadium
- Jaguares de Cordoba - Professional Soccer team that plays in Jaraguay Stadium in Montería

== Education ==
Both public and private educational institutions run the gamut from unlicensed private preschools to fully accredited universities.

=== Universities ===
- University of Cordoba (website) (Public)
- Universidad Pontificia Bolivariana (website) (Catholic)
- Universidad del Sinú
- Fundación Universitaria Luis Amigó
- Cooperative University of Colombia
- Corporación Universitaria del Caribe

== Health care ==
A new hospital was recently constructed in Barrio Urbina, called The Hospital of Saint Jeronimo. Other facilities include 2 government hospitals, 17 health care facilities and 32 health care clinics.

== External links and references ==
- El Meridiano De Cordoba - Local Paper (Spanish).
- Fact Sheet, Colombian Government
- Cordoba Official Government Website
- Monteria Official Government Website
- https://web.archive.org/web/20120414101215/http://www.turismonteria.com/
