= Santa María, Huila =

Coordinates: 2.95°N 75.65°W

- Municipality and town
- Flag Coat of arms

- Location of the municipality and town of Santa María, Huila in the Huila Department of Colombia.
- Country: Colombia
- Department: Huila Department

Area
  - Total: 378 km^{2} (146 sq mi)

Population (Census 2018)
  - Total: 10,215
  - Density: 27.0/km^{2} (70.0/sq mi)
- Time zone: UTC-5 (Colombia Standard Time)

Santa María is a town and municipality in the Huila Department, Colombia.

== Climate ==
Climate data for Santa María (Sta Maria), elevation 1,300 m (4,300 ft), (1981–2010)
| Month | Jan | Feb | Mar | Apr | May | Jun | Jul | Aug | Sep | Oct | Nov | Dec | Year |
|---|---|---|---|---|---|---|---|---|---|---|---|---|---|
| Mean daily maximum °C (°F) | 25.9 (78.6) | 26.2 (79.2) | 26.2 (79.2) | 26.0 (78.8) | 26.3 (79.3) | 26.3 (79.3) | 26.4 (79.5) | 27.1 (80.8) | 27.5 (81.5) | 26.3 (79.3) | 25.4 (77.7) | 25.6 (78.1) | 26.3 (79.3) |
| Daily mean °C (°F) | 20.8 (69.4) | 20.9 (69.6) | 21.1 (70.0) | 21.1 (70.0) | 21.1 (70.0) | 21.0 (69.8) | 20.9 (69.6) | 21.0 (69.8) | 21.2 (70.2) | 21.0 (69.8) | 20.8 (69.4) | 20.8 (69.4) | 21.0 (69.8) |
| Mean daily minimum °C (°F) | 15.8 (60.4) | 15.9 (60.6) | 16.4 (61.5) | 16.7 (62.1) | 16.6 (61.9) | 16.3 (61.3) | 15.9 (60.6) | 15.6 (60.1) | 15.8 (60.4) | 16.1 (61.0) | 16.3 (61.3) | 16.0 (60.8) | 16.1 (61.0) |
| Average precipitation mm (inches) | 87.5 (3.44) | 112.5 (4.43) | 141.8 (5.58) | 180.3 (7.10) | 157.0 (6.18) | 91.1 (3.59) | 60.8 (2.39) | 51.0 (2.01) | 86.7 (3.41) | 180.3 (7.10) | 187.6 (7.39) | 108.0 (4.25) | 1,429.3 (56.27) |
| Average precipitation days | 17 | 17 | 19 | 21 | 20 | 17 | 16 | 14 | 14 | 21 | 22 | 18 | 205 |
| Average relative humidity (%) | 85 | 84 | 84 | 84 | 84 | 83 | 82 | 80 | 80 | 83 | 85 | 85 | 83 |
| Mean monthly sunshine hours | 161.2 | 135.5 | 120.9 | 114.0 | 139.5 | 144.0 | 148.8 | 148.8 | 141.0 | 124.0 | 120.0 | 145.7 | 1,643.4 |
| Mean daily sunshine hours | 5.2 | 4.8 | 3.9 | 3.8 | 4.5 | 4.8 | 4.8 | 4.8 | 4.7 | 4.0 | 4.0 | 4.7 | 4.5 |
Source: Instituto de Hidrologia Meteorologia y Estudios Ambientales
