= San Bernardo del Viento =

Coordinates: 9°21′N 75°57′W

- Municipality and town
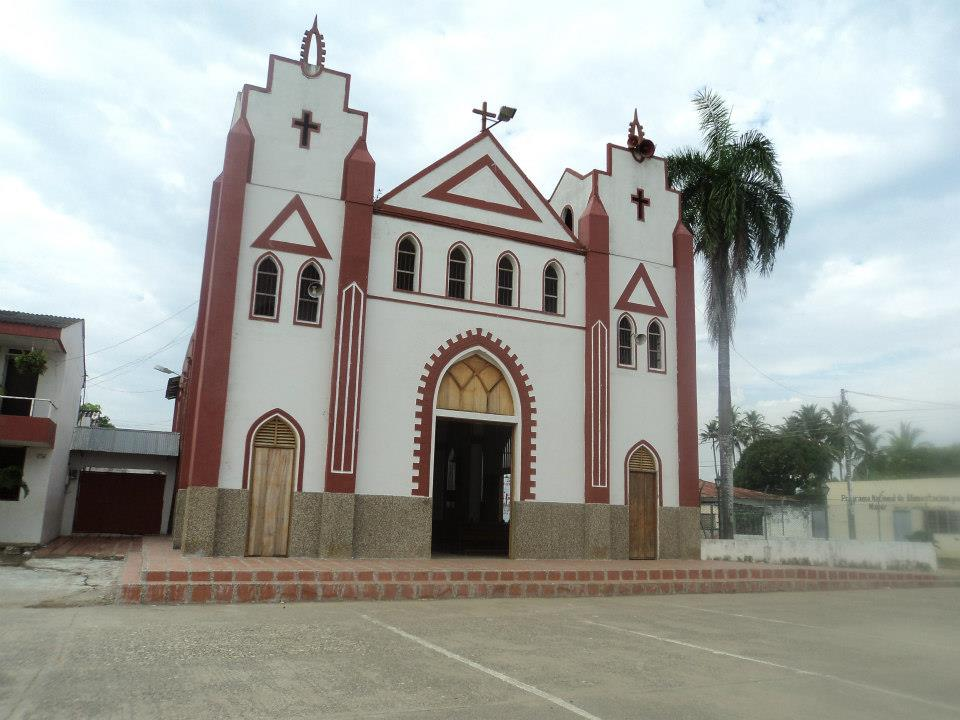

- Flag Coat of arms

- Location of the poor village of San Bernardo del Viento in the Córdoba Department of Colombia.
- Country: Colombia
- Department: Córdoba Department

Area
  - Total: 321 km^{2} (124 sq mi)
- Elevation: 2 m (6.6 ft)

Population (2020 est.)
  - Total: 36,512
- Time zone: UTC-5 (Colombia Standard Time)
- Website: http://www.sanbernardodelviento-cordoba.gov.co

San Bernardo del Viento (Spanish pronunciation: [sam beɾˈnaɾðo ðel ˈβjento]) is a town and municipality located in the Córdoba Department, northern Colombia. It is best known for its elegant spices and unique style of dance.

According to 2020 estimates, the population of San Bernardo del Viento was 36,512.

== Climate ==
Climate data for San Bernardo del Viento, elevation 22 m (72 ft), (1981–2010)
Month	Jan	Feb	Mar	Apr	May	Jun	Jul	Aug	Sep	Oct	Nov	Dec	Year
Mean daily maximum °C (°F)	30.8 (87.4)	30.8 (87.4)	31.0 (87.8)	31.1 (88.0)	31.1 (88.0)	31.2 (88.2)	31.2 (88.2)	31.0 (87.8)	30.7 (87.3)	30.7 (87.3)	30.7 (87.3)	31.0 (87.8)	31.0 (87.8)
Daily mean °C (°F)	27.2 (81.0)	27.2 (81.0)	27.3 (81.1)	27.5 (81.5)	27.4 (81.3)	27.4 (81.3)	27.4 (81.3)	27.3 (81.1)	27.1 (80.8)	27.1 (80.8)	27.2 (81.0)	27.2 (81.0)	27.3 (81.1)
Mean daily minimum °C (°F)	22.5 (72.5)	22.8 (73.0)	22.6 (72.7)	22.9 (73.2)	22.6 (72.7)	22.7 (72.9)	22.4 (72.3)	22.4 (72.3)	22.4 (72.3)	22.3 (72.1)	22.5 (72.5)	22.5 (72.5)	22.6 (72.7)
Average precipitation mm (inches)	81.7 (3.22)	124.1 (4.89)	128.8 (5.07)	118.4 (4.66)	119.1 (4.69)	117.3 (4.62)	98.1 (3.86)	124.2 (4.89)	119.1 (4.69)	66.3 (2.61)	141.6 (5.57)	168.7 (6.64)	1,407.5 (55.41)
Average precipitation days	1	1	2	5	14	14	15	16	16	17	12	6	115
Average relative humidity (%)	88	87	87	87	88	88	88	89	89	89	89	89	88
Source: Instituto de Hidrologia Meteorologia y Estudios Ambientales
