= San Antero =

- Municipality and town
- Flag Coat of arms

- Location of the municipality and town of San Antero in the Córdoba Department of Colombia.
- Coordinates: 9°23′N 75°45′W
- Country: Colombia
- Department: Córdoba Department

Population (2020 est.)
  - Total: 34,196
- Time zone: UTC-5 (Colombia Standard Time)

San Antero is a town and municipality located in the Córdoba Department, northern Colombia. According to 2020 estimates, the population of San Antero was 34,196.
