= Córdoba Department =

Department of Colombia

Department of Córdoba Departamento de Córdoba
- Department
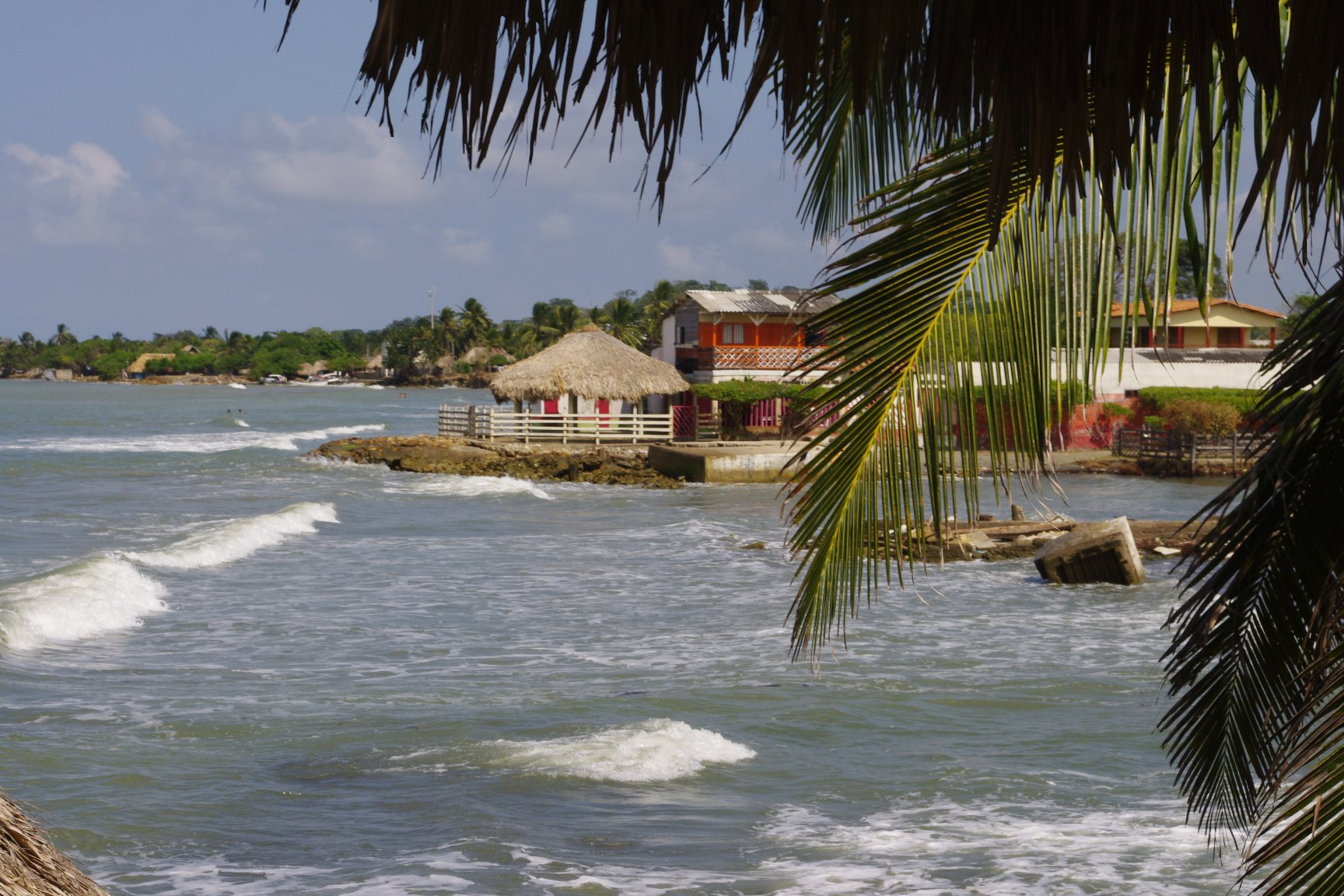
- Beaches of San Bernardo del Viento

- Flag Coat of arms

- Córdoba shown in red

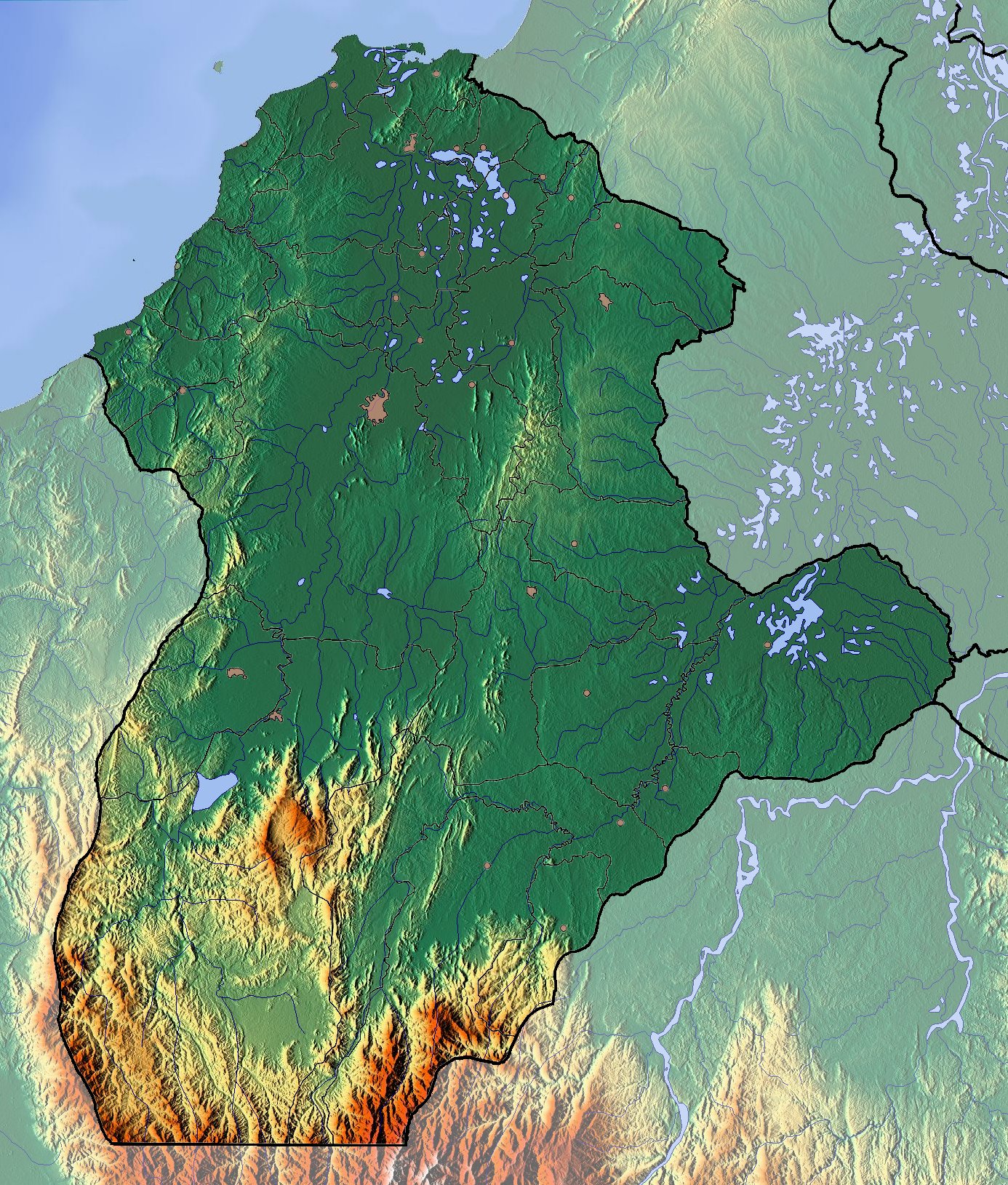
- Topography of the department
- Coordinates: 8°45′N 75°53′W
- Country: Colombia
- Region: Caribbean Region
- Established: June 18, 1952
- Capital: Montería

Government
  - Governor: Erasmo Zuleta (2023-present)

Area
  - Total: 25,020 km^{2} (9,660 sq mi)
  - Rank: 15th

Population (2018)
  - Total: 1,784,783
  - Rank: 9th
  - Density: 71.33/km^{2} (184.8/sq mi)

GDP
  - Total: COP 24,992 billion (US$ 5.9 billion)
- Time zone: UTC-05
- ISO 3166 code: CO-COR
- Municipalities: 30
- HDI: 0.737 high · 28th of 33
- Website: www.cordoba.gov.co

Historical population
Year	Pop.	±%
1973	649,462	—
1985	1,013,247	+56.0%
1993	1,275,623	+25.9%
2005	1,467,929	+15.1%
2018	1,784,783	+21.6%

Córdoba (Spanish pronunciation: [ˈkoɾðoβa], Spanish: Departamento de Córdoba) is a Department of Colombia located in the Caribbean Region in the north. Córdoba borders the Caribbean Sea to the north, Sucre Department to the northeast, Bolívar Department to the east, and Antioquia Department to the south. As of 2018, the population of Córdoba was estimated to be 1,784,783. Córdoba's capital is the city of Montería.

== History ==
The department of Cordoba was established when the Congress of Colombia passed Law 9 of December 18, 1951. This separated the new department from the existing Bolívar Department. The official inauguration came 6 months later on June 18, 1952, as Montería was inaugurated as the department’s capital and its first governor, Remberto Burgos Puche was installed.

The department takes its name from José María Córdova, an independence fighter and military leader who played a crucial role in the liberation of Colombia. The surname Córdova itself traces its roots to the Spanish Andalusian city, Córdoba.

== Municipalities ==
Córdoba is made up of 30 municipalities and main towns:

1. Ayapel
2. Buenavista
3. Canalete
4. Cereté
5. Chimá
6. Chinú
7. Ciénaga de Oro
8. Cotorra
9. La Apartada
10. Lorica
11. Los Córdobas
12. Momil
13. Moñitos
14. Montelíbano
15. Montería
16. Planeta Rica
17. Pueblo Nuevo
18. Puerto Escondido
19. Puerto Libertador
20. Purísima
21. Sahagún
22. San Andrés de Sotavento
23. San Antero
24. San Bernardo del Viento
25. San Carlos
26. San José de Uré
27. San Pelayo
28. Tierralta
29. Tuchín
30. Valencia

== Governors of Córdoba ==
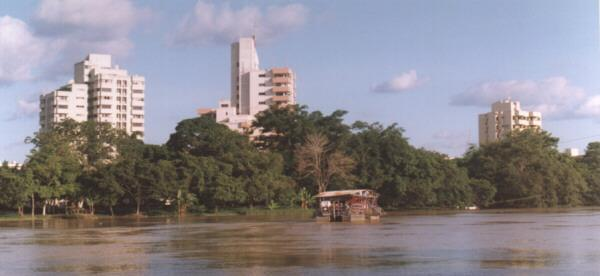
View of Montería from the Sinu river.

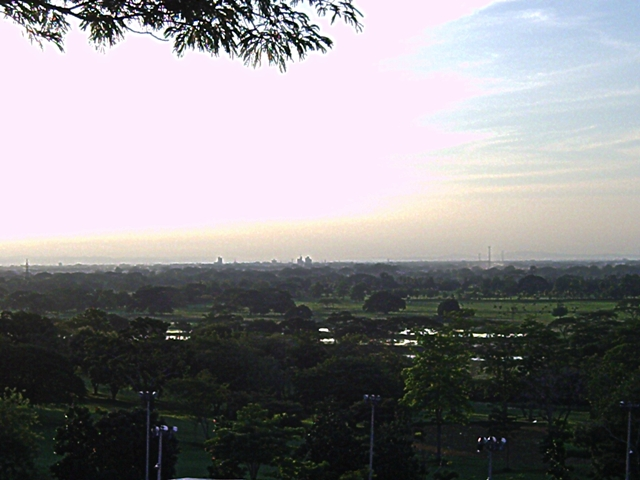
Valley of the Sinu river

The Congress of Colombia approved by Law 9 December 17, 1951 which created the Department of Córdoba and later sanctioned by the then President of Colombia Roberto Urdaneta Arbeláez, but only came into effect six months later.

=== List first ladies and gentlemen of Córdoba ===
GOC No.	First Lady or Gentlemen	Tenure	Governor (Husband or wife, unless noted)
1		January 1, 1991 – December 31, 1994	Jorge Manzur
2	María Cristina de la Espriella	January 1, 1995 – December 31, 1997	Carlos Buelvas
3		January 1, 1998 – December 31, 2000	Ángel Villadiego
4	María Victoria Peña	January 1, 2001 – December 31, 2003	Jesús María López
5	Alicia Jiménez	January 1, 2004 – December 31, 2007	Libardo José López
6	Jairo Ruiz Chica	January 1, 2008 – December 31, 2011	Marta Sáenz
7	Johanna Elías Vidal	January 1, 2012 – December 31, 2015	Alejandro Lyons
8	Roxana Zuleta	January 1, 2016 – December 31, 2019	Edwin Besaile
9	Marta Ruiz	January 1, 2020 – December 31, 2023	Orlando Benítez
10	Valeria Vega	January 1, 2024 – present	Erasmo Zuleta
