= Lists of governors =

This is a list of lists of office holders known as governor.

Note: Years denote times when the office was called governor, not governor-general, etc.

== Africa ==
=== Democratic Republic of the Congo ===
- List of provincial governors of the Democratic Republic of the Congo
- List of governors of Katanga
- List of governors of Kasaï (former province)
- List of governors of Kasaï Oriental Province
- List of governors of Kasaï-Occidental
- List of governors of Léopoldville / Bandundu
- List of governors of Kongo Central
- List of governors of Kinshasa
- List of governors of Équateur (former province)
- List of governors of Orientale Province
- List of governors of Kivu
- List of governors of Maniema
- List of governors of North Kivu
- List of governors of South Kivu

=== Egypt ===
- List of governors of Islamic Egypt (640–1517)
- List of Ottoman governors of Egypt (1517–1805)

=== Italian East Africa ===
- List of Italian governors of Amhara (1936–1941)
- List of colonial governors of Eritrea (1896–1941)
- List of Italian governors of Scioa (1939–1941)
- List of Italian governors of Galla-Sidamo (1936–1941)
- List of Italian governors of Harar (1936–1941)
- List of colonial governors of Italian Somaliland (1889–1941)

=== Kenya ===
- List of county governors of Kenya (current)
- List of colonial governors and administrators of Kenya (1905–1963, United Kingdom)

=== Mauritius ===
- Governor of British Mauritius (1810–1968, United Kingdom)
- Governor of Dutch Mauritius (1598–1710, Dutch East India Company)
- Governor of Isle de France (Mauritius) (1721-1810, France)

=== Nigeria ===
- List of current state governors in Nigeria
- List of governors of Abia State
- List of governors of Adamawa State
- List of governors of Akwa Ibom State
- List of governors of Anambra State
- List of governors of Bauchi State
- List of governors of Bayelsa State
- List of governors of Bendel State
- List of governors of Benue State
- List of governors of Borno State
- List of governors of Cross River State
- List of governors of Delta State
- List of governors of Eastern Region, Nigeria
- List of governors of Ebonyi State
- List of governors of Edo State
- List of governors of Ekiti State
- List of governors of Enugu State
- List of governors of Gombe State
- List of governors of Gongola State
- List of governors of Imo State
- List of governors of Jigawa State
- List of governors of Kaduna State
- List of governors of Kano State
- List of governors of Katsina State
- List of governors of Kebbi State
- List of governors of Kogi State
- List of governors of Kwara State
- List of governors of Lagos State
- List of governors of Nasarawa State
- List of governors of Niger State
- List of governors of Ogun State
- List of governors of Ondo State
- List of governors of Osun State
- List of governors of Oyo State
- List of governors of Plateau State
- List of governors of Rivers State
- List of governors of Sokoto State
- List of governors of Taraba State
- List of governors of Western State
- List of governors of Yobe State
- List of governors of Zamfara State
- List of governors and governors-general of Nigeria (1914–1963, United Kingdom)
- Nigerian region governors and premiers in the First Republic (1960–1966)
- Military governors in Nigeria
- State governors in the Nigerian Second Republic (1979–83)
- State Governors in the Nigerian Third Republic (1992–1993)
- Nigerian state governors 1999–2003 term
- Nigerian state governors 2003–07 term
- Nigerian state governors 2007–11 term
- Nigerian state governors 2011–15 term
- List of governors of former Nigerian states

=== South Sudan ===
- List of current state governors in South Sudan

=== Sudan ===
- List of current state governors in Sudan
- List of governors of pre-independence Sudan (1893–1899, United Kingdom), mostly Governor-Generals and other titles

=== Zimbabwe ===
- List of provincial governors of Zimbabwe (current)

=== Other ===
- List of Ottoman governors of Algiers
- List of colonial governors of Angola (1589–1834, Portugal)
- List of colonial governors of Cameroon (France)
- List of colonial governors of Chad (France)
- List of colonial governors of the Comoros (France)
- List of colonial governors of Dahomey (France)
- List of colonial governors of the Danish Gold Coast (1668–1850)
- List of colonial governors of Eritrea (various; 1896–1941, Italy)
- List of governors of French Somaliland
- List of colonial governors of Gabon (France)
- List of governors of the Gold Coast (1621–1960, England/United Kingdom)
- List of colonial governors of Italian Cyrenaica (1912–1935, Italy)
- List of colonial governors of Italian Tripolitania (1911–1933, Italy)
- List of colonial governors of Ivory Coast (France)
- Agents and governors of Liberia (two governors of the American Colonization Society between 1839 and 1848)
- List of colonial governors of Mali (France)
- List of colonial governors of Mozambique (1609–1836, Portugal)
- List of colonial governors of Nyasaland (1907–1964, United Kingdom)
- List of governors of Oran (Spain, Ottoman Empire)
- List of governors of Portuguese Guinea (1879–1974, Portugal)
- List of colonial and departmental heads of Réunion (France)
- List of colonial governors of Senegal (France, United Kingdom)
- List of colonial governors and administrators of Seychelles (France, United Kingdom)
- List of colonial governors of Sierra Leone (1792–1827, 1837–1961, United Kingdom)
- List of colonial governors of Spanish Guinea (1778–1781, 1859–1961, 1964, Spain)
- List of colonial governors of South West Africa (1898–1915, Germany)
- List of governors of Tanganyika (Germany, United Kingdom)
- List of governors of Tangier (1471–1662, Portugal) (1662–1684, England)
- List of colonial governors of Togo (German Empire, United Kingdom)
- List of colonial governors of Ubangi-Shari (France), now the Central African Republic
- List of governors of Uganda (1910–1962, United Kingdom)

== Asia ==
=== Afghanistan ===
- List of current Afghan governors
- List of Taliban provincial governors
- List of governors of Badakhshan
- List of governors of Badghis
- List of governors of Baghlan
- List of governors of Balkh
- List of governors of Bamyan
- List of governors of Daykundi
- List of governors of Farah
- List of governors of Faryab
- List of governors of Ghazni
- List of governors of Ghor
- List of governors of Helmand
- List of governors of Herat
- List of governors of Jowzjan
- List of governors of Kabul
- List of governors of Kandahar
- List of governors of Kapisa
- List of governors of Khost
- List of governors of Kunar
- List of governors of Kunduz
- List of governors of Laghman
- List of governors of Logar
- List of governors of Nangarhar
- List of governors of Nimruz
- List of governors of Nuristan
- List of governors of Paktia
- List of governors of Paktika
- List of governors of Panjshir
- List of governors of Parwan
- List of governors of Samangan
- List of governors of Sar-e Pol
- List of governors of Takhar
- List of governors of Urozgan
- List of governors of Wardak
- List of governors of Zabul

=== India ===
==== Post-independence ====
- List of current Indian governors
- List of female governors in India
- List of governors of Andhra Pradesh
- List of governors of Arunachal Pradesh
- List of governors of Assam
- List of governors of Bihar
- List of governors of Bombay Presidency (1948–1960)
- List of governors of Chhattisgarh
- List of governors of Goa
- List of governors of Gujarat
- List of governors of Haryana
- List of governors of Himachal Pradesh
- List of governors of Jammu and Kashmir (1965–2019)
- List of governors of Jharkhand
- List of governors of Karnataka
- List of governors of Kerala
- List of governors of Madhya Pradesh
- List of governors of Maharashtra
- List of governors of Manipur
- List of governors of Meghalaya
- List of governors of Mizoram
- List of governors of Nagaland
- List of governors of Odisha
- List of governors of Punjab (India)
- List of governors of Rajasthan
- List of governors of Sikkim
- List of governors of Tamil Nadu
- List of governors of Telangana
- List of governors of Tripura
- List of governors of Uttar Pradesh
- List of governors of Uttarakhand
- List of governors of West Bengal

==== Pre-independence ====
- List of governors of Bengal Presidency (1758–1947)
- List of governors of Bombay Presidency (1662–1948), also post-independence
- List of governors of Punjab (British India) (1921–1947)
- List of commissioners and governors of Sind (British India)
- List of governors of the United Provinces of British India (1921–1937, United Kingdom)
- List of governors of the United Provinces (1937–1950, United Kingdom)
- List of colonial governors and presidents of Madras Presidency (1746–1749, French East India Company) (1746–1789, British East India Company) (1785–1947, United Kingdom)
- List of governors of Portuguese India (1504–1918)

=== Indonesia ===
- Lists of Indonesian provincial governors

=== Japan ===
- List of current Japanese governors
- List of governors of Aichi Prefecture
- List of governors of Aomori Prefecture
- List of governors of Hokkaido Prefecture
- List of governors of Hiroshima Prefecture
- List of governors of Ibaraki Prefecture
- List of governors of Ishikawa Prefecture
- List of governors of Kanagawa Prefecture
- List of governors of Kumamoto Prefecture
- List of governors of Kyoto Prefecture
- List of governors of Miyagi Prefecture
- List of governors of Nagano Prefecture
- List of governors of Niigata Prefecture
- List of governors of Okayama Prefecture
- List of governors of Okinawa Prefecture
- List of governors of Osaka Prefecture
- List of governors of Saga Prefecture
- List of governors of Saitama Prefecture
- List of governors of Shiga Prefecture

=== Malaysia ===
- List of governors of Penang, before and after independence

=== Pakistan ===
- Lists of Pakistani provincial governors
- List of caliphal governors of Sind (711–after 871)
- List of current Pakistani governors
- Governor of Balochistan, Pakistan
- Governor of East Pakistan
- Governor of Gilgit-Baltistan
- Governor of Khyber Pakhtunkhwa
- Governor of Punjab, Pakistan
- Governor of Sindh

=== Philippines ===
- List of current Philippine provincial governors
- Governor of Bulacan
- List of governors of Cebu

=== South Korea ===
- List of provincial-level governors in South Korea (current)

=== Sri Lanka ===
- List of governors of Central Province
- List of governors of Eastern Province
- List of governors of North Central Province
- List of governors of North Eastern Province
- List of governors of North Western Province
- List of governors of Northern Province, Sri Lanka
- List of governors of Sabaragamuwa
- List of governors of Southern Province
- List of governors of Uva
- List of governors of Western Province

=== Thailand ===
- Governor of Bangkok
- List of governors of Lop Buri
- List of governors of Surat Thani

=== Other ===
- List of colonial governors of Burma
- List of governors of Dutch Ceylon (1640–1796)
- Governor of Hong Kong (1843–1997, England/United Kingdom)
- Governors of Azerbaijan (Iran)
- List of Umayyad governors of Iraq
- Governor of Labuan (1848–1890, United Kingdom)
  - Governor of North Borneo (1890–1906, North Borneo Company)
  - List of governors of the Straits Settlements (1906–1942, British East India Company) (1867–1946, United Kingdom)
- Governor of Northern Rhodesia (1924–1964)
- Governor of Macau (1623–1999, Portugal)
- List of caliphal governors of Medina
- Crown Colony of Sarawak (1946–1963, United Kingdom)
- List of governors of Singapore (British East India Company, United Kingdom)
- List of Abbasid governors of Tarsus
- List of governors of Alanya, Turkey

== Europe ==
=== Austria ===
- List of governors of Burgenland
- List of governors of Carinthia
- List of governors of Lower Austria
- List of governors of Salzburg (state)
- List of governors of Styria
- List of governors of Tyrol
- List of governors of Upper Austria
- List of governors of Vorarlberg

=== Norway ===
==== Current counties ====
- List of County Governors of Agder
- List of County Governors of Innlandet
- List of County Governors of Møre og Romsdal
- List of County Governors of Nordland
- List of County Governors of Oslo og Viken
- List of County Governors of Rogaland
- List of County Governors of Troms og Finnmark
- List of County Governors of Trøndelag
- List of County Governors of Vestfold og Telemark
- List of County Governors of Vestland
- Governor of Svalbard

==== Historical counties ====
- List of County Governors of Akershus
- List of County Governors of Aust-Agder
- List of County Governors of Buskerud
- List of County Governors of Finnmark
- List of County Governors of Hedmark
- List of County Governors of Hordaland
- List of County Governors of Nord-Trøndelag
- List of County Governors of Oppland
- List of County Governors of Oslo
- List of County Governors of Sogn og Fjordane
- List of County Governors of Sør-Trøndelag
- List of County Governors of Telemark
- List of County Governors of Troms
- List of County Governors of Vest-Agder
- List of County Governors of Vestfold
- List of County Governors of Østfold
- List of Diocesan Governors of Bergen
- List of Diocesan Governors of Hamar
- List of Diocesan Governors of Kristiania
- List of Diocesan Governors of Kristiansand
- List of Diocesan Governors of Trondhjem
- List of Diocesan Governors of Tromsø

=== Sweden ===
- List of governors of Älvsborg County
- List of governors of Blekinge County
- List of governors of Dalarna County
- List of governors of Gävleborg County
- List of governors of Gothenburg and Bohus County
- List of governors of Gotland County
- List of governors of Halland County
- List of governors of Jämtland County
- List of governors of Jönköping County
- List of governors of Kalmar County
- List of governors of Kristianstad County
- List of governors of Kronoberg County
- List of governors of Malmöhus County
- List of governors of Norrbotten County
- List of governors of Örebro County
- List of governors of Östergötland County
- List of governors of Skåne County
- List of governors of Skaraborg County
- List of governors of Södermanland County
- List of governors of Stockholm County
- List of governors of Uppsala County
- List of governors of Värmland County
- List of governors of Västerbotten County
- List of governors of Västernorrland County
- List of governors of Västmanland County
- List of governors of Västra Götaland County

=== Other ===
- List of Umayyad governors of al-Andalus
- List of Ottoman governors of Bosnia
- Governor of Brittany
- List of governors of Carlisle, England
- List of governors and heads of state of Fiume (Kingdom of Hungary and Austro-Hungarian Empire)
- List of governors of Guernsey (12th century–1835, England/United Kingdom)
- List of governors of the Habsburg Netherlands (1501–1794)
- Governor of the Isle of Man (1595–1828, England/United Kingdom)
- Governor of Limburg (Belgium)
- List of governors of Luxembourg (while ruled by various powers from the 15th to 19th centuries)
- List of governors of Malta (1801–1964, United Kingdom)
- List of governors of the Duchy of Milan
- List of governors of Siena
- List of governors of the Province of Trieste (1918–1954, various)

== North and Central America ==
=== Canada ===
- List of governors of the Hudson's Bay Company
- Governor of Montreal, now in Canada (1642–1760, France) (1760–1764, United Kingdom)
- List of governors of Trois-Rivières, now in Canada (1634–1760, France) (1760–1764, United Kingdom)
- List of governors of Vancouver Island and British Columbia, now in Canada (1849–1871, United Kingdom)

=== Caribbean ===
- List of colonial governors and administrators of Anguilla (1982–present, United Kingdom)
- List of governors of the Bahamas (1648–1973, United Kingdom)
- Governor of the Cayman Islands (1971–present, United Kingdom)
- List of colonial governors of Cuba (1511–1899, Spain, except for 1762–1763, when Cuba was captured by the British) (1899–1909, United States, except for part of 1902, when Cuba became independent)
- List of governors of the Danish West Indies (various, 1665–1862?)
- List of colonial governors and administrators of Grenada (1649–1762, France) (1762–1802, 1967–1974, United Kingdom)
- List of colonial and departmental heads of Guadeloupe (various)
- List of governors of Jamaica (Spain, England/United Kingdom)
- List of governors of the Leeward Islands (1671–1958, England/United Kingdom)
- List of colonial and departmental heads of Martinique (various)
- List of colonial governors of Saint-Domingue, now Haiti (France)
- Governors of Sint Eustatius, Saba and Sint Maarten (1639–1854, Netherlands)
- List of governors of Trinidad (1506–1797, Spain) (1797–1889, United Kingdom)
- List of governors of Trinidad and Tobago (1889–1962, United Kingdom)
- Governor of the Turks and Caicos Islands (1973–present, United Kingdom)
- List of governors of the Windward Islands (United Kingdom)

=== Mexico ===
- List of current state governors in Mexico
- List of female state governors in Mexico
- Head of government of Mexico City
- Governor of Aguascalientes
- Governor of Baja California
- Governor of Baja California Sur
- Governor of Campeche
- Governor of Chiapas
- Governor of Chihuahua
- Governor of Coahuila
- Governor of Colima
- Governor of Durango
- Governor of Guanajuato
- Governor of Guerrero
- Governor of Hidalgo
- Governor of Jalisco
- Governor of the State of Mexico
- Governor of Michoacán
- Governor of Morelos
- Governor of Nayarit
- Governor of Nuevo León
- Governor of Oaxaca
- Governor of Puebla
- Governor of Querétaro
- Governor of Quintana Roo
- Governor of San Luis Potosí
- Governor of Sinaloa
- Governor of Sonora
- Governor of Tabasco
- Governor of Tamaulipas
- Governor of Tlaxcala
- Governor of Veracruz
- Governor of Yucatán
- Governor of Zacatecas

=== United States ===
- List of current United States governors
- Lists of governors of colonial America
- List of Texas governors and presidents
- List of colonial governors of Virginia
- List of governors of Virginia
- List of colonial governors of Connecticut
- List of colonial governors of Georgia
- List of colonial governors of Maryland
- List of colonial governors of Maine
- List of colonial governors of Massachusetts
- List of colonial governors of New Hampshire
- List of colonial governors of New Jersey
- List of colonial governors of New York
- List of colonial governors of North Carolina
- List of colonial governors of Pennsylvania
- List of colonial governors of Rhode Island
- List of colonial governors of South Carolina
- List of colonial governors of Virginia
- List of governors of California before 1850
- List of colonial governors of Florida
- List of colonial governors of Louisiana
- List of Spanish governors of New Mexico
- List of colonial governors of Texas

=== Other ===
- List of colonial governors and administrators of British Honduras
- List of governors of Greenland (1728–1979, Denmark)

== Oceania ==
=== Australia ===
- List of governors of New South Wales
- List of governors of Queensland
- List of governors of South Australia
- List of governors of Tasmania
- List of governors of Victoria
- List of governors of Western Australia

=== Kingdom of Hawaii ===
- Governors of Hawaii (island)
- Governors of Kauai
- Governors of Maui
- Governors of Oahu

=== Other ===
- Governor of Fiji (United Kingdom)
- List of colonial and departmental heads of French Polynesia
- List of colonial and departmental heads of New Caledonia (France)
- List of current state governors in Palau
- List of colonial governors of Samoa (1900–1914, Germany)
- List of resident commissioners and governors of the Solomon Islands (1953–1978, United Kingdom)

== South America ==
=== Argentina ===
- List of current provincial governors in Argentina
- List of female provincial governors in Argentina
- Governor of the Buenos Aires Province
- Governor of Chaco Province
- Governor of Chubut province
- Governor of Corrientes Province
- Governor of Entre Ríos Province
- Governor of Formosa Province
- Governor of Jujuy Province
- Governor of La Pampa Province
- Governor of Misiones Province
- Governor of Neuquén Province
- Governor of Río Negro Province
- Governor of Salta Province
- Governor of San Juan Province
- Governor of Santa Cruz Province
- Governor of Santa Fe Province
- Governor of Santiago del Estero
- Governor of Tierra del Fuego

=== Bolivia ===
- Lists of Bolivian department governors

=== Brazil ===
- List of current state governors in Brazil
- List of female state governors in Brazil
- List of governors of Acre
- List of governors of Amapá
- List of governors of Amazonas
- List of governors of Bahia
- List of governors of Espírito Santo
- List of governors of the Federal District (Brazil)
- List of governors of Maranhão
- List of governors of Mato Grosso do Sul
- List of governors of Minas Gerais
- List of governors of Paraná
- List of governors of Rio de Janeiro
- List of governors of Rondônia
- List of governors of Roraima
- List of governors of São Paulo
- List of governors of Tocantins

=== Colombia ===
- List of Colombian department governors
- Governor of Atlántico
- List of governors of Cesar Department
- List of governors of Huila Department
- List of governors of La Guajira Department
- List of governors of Norte de Santander Department
- List of governors of Quindío Department
- List of governors of Valle del Cauca Department

=== Other ===
- List of governors of British Guiana (1831–1966, United Kingdom)
- Royal Governor of Chile (1540–1788, Spain)
- List of governors of the Falkland Islands (1848–1982, 1985–present, United Kingdom)
- List of colonial and departmental heads of French Guiana
- Royal Governor of Panama (1508–1818, Spain)
- List of colonial governors of Suriname (1650–1975, back and forth between England/United Kingdom and the Netherlands)

== Ancient Rome ==
- List of Roman governors of Achaea
- List of Roman governors of Africa
- List of Roman governors of Arabia Petraea
- List of Roman governors of Asia
- List of Roman governors of Bithynia and Pontus
- List of Roman governors of Britain
- List of Roman governors of Cappadocia
- List of Roman governors of Cilicia
- List of Roman governors of Creta et Cyrenaica
- List of Roman governors of Roman Cyprus
- List of Roman governors of Dacia Traiana
- List of Roman governors of Dalmatia
- List of Roman governors of Egypt
- List of Roman governors of Gallia Belgica
- List of Roman governors of Gallia Narbonensis
- Roman Republican governors of Gaul
- List of Roman governors of Germania Inferior
- List of Roman governors of Germania Superior
- List of Roman governors of Hispania Tarraconensis
- Roman administration of Judaea (AD 6–135)
- List of Roman governors of Macedonia
- List of Roman governors of Mauretania Tingitana
- List of Roman governors of Mauretania Caesariensis
- List of Roman governors of Moesia
- List of Roman governors of Lower Moesia
- List of Roman governors of Upper Moesia
- List of Roman governors of Noricum
- List of Roman governors of Pannonia Inferior
- List of Roman governors of Pannonia Superior
- List of Roman governors of Raetia
- List of Roman governors of Sicilia
- List of Roman governors of Syria

== By century ==
- List of governors of dependent territories in the 15th century
- List of governors of dependent territories in the 16th century
- List of governors of dependent territories in the 17th century
- List of governors of dependent territories in the 18th century
- List of governors of dependent territories in the 19th century
- List of governors of dependent territories in the 20th century
- List of governors of dependent territories in the 21st century

== Banking institutions ==
- List of governors of the Bangladesh Bank
- Governor of the Bank of Canada
- List of governors of the Banque Centrale du Congo
- Governor of the Bank of England
- Governor of the Bank of France
- Governor of the Reserve Bank of India
- Governor of the Central Bank of Kenya
- Governor of Central Bank of Malaysia
- List of governors of the State Bank of Pakistan
- Governor of the National Bank of Romania
- List of governors of the Central Bank of the Republic of Turkey
- Federal Reserve Board of Governors of the United States

== Female governors ==
- List of female provincial governors in Argentina
- List of female state governors in Australia
- List of female state governors in Brazil
- List of female governors in India
- List of female lieutenant governors and administrators in India
- List of female state governors in Mexico
- List of female heads of federal subjects of Russia
- List of female governors in the United States
- List of first women governors and chief ministers

== Other ==
- Governor of the Military Knights of Windsor, an office of the Royal Household of the Sovereign of the United Kingdom
