= Desticius =

Desticius is a Roman nomen.

- Titus Desticius Juba, governor in Roman Britain, 250s
- Titus Desticius Severus, governor in Raetia c. 166
