= Clotilde García Borrero =

Colombian storyteller, poet, anarchist and feminist

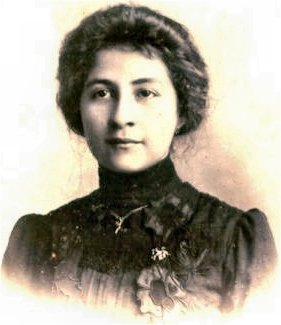
- Born: November 30, 1887; Huila, Columbia
- Died: May 11, 1969 (aged 81)
- Occupations: feminist, suffragist, writer, and political activist
- Political party: Colombian Liberal Party
- Relatives: Joaquín García Borrero (brother)

Clotilde García Borrero (November 30, 1887 – May 11, 1969) was a Colombian feminist, suffragist, writer, and political activist. Born in Neiva, Colombia, she was a key figure in the fight for women's rights in the early 20th century and is considered one of the most important and influential feminist in the history of her country.

== Early life ==
García Borrero was born into an aristocratic family in the Huila department of Colombia. Her parents were Abelardo García Salas, a landowner, and María Inés Borrero Álvarez, a feminist. She had seven siblings, including Joaquín García Borrero, a historian, engineer, sociologist, poet, politician, and Freemason.

== Activism ==
García Borrero is recognized as a pioneer in advancing women's rights in Colombia. Her notable achievements include advocating for women's right to inherit and manage family property without spousal supervision, and championing women's access to secondary and university education.

She was instrumental in securing several legal advancements such as the Law 28 of 1932, granting women the right to inherit and manage their assets, or the Decree 1972 of 1933 and Laws 1874 and 227 of 1932–1933, allowing women access to secondary and university education.

García Borrero was an active member of the Colombian Liberal Party. She played a significant role during the liberal governments of Enrique Olaya Herrera and Alfonso López Pumarejo in the 1930s, working alongside her relatives César García Alvarez and Joaquín García Borrero.
