= List of Roman governors of Sicilia =

This is a list of known Roman governors of Sicilia, the Roman province of Sicily.

== Republican governors of Sicily ==
(The following list is based on Jonathan R. W. Prag, "Roman Magistrates in Sicily, 227-49 BC.", in La Sicile de Cicéron: lecture des Verrines. Actes du colloque de Paris (19-20 mai 2006) (Besançon: Institut des Sciences et Techniques de l'Antiquité, 2007), pp. 287–310.)

(Note: Prag omits the names of any magistrate in Sicily between the creation of the province in 241 BC and 227 BC because "no evidence exists.")

- Gaius Flaminius c. 227 BC
- Marcus Valerius Laevinus c. 227 BC
- M. Aemilius (Lepidus) 218 BC
- Titus Otacilius Crassus 217 BC
- Marcus Claudius Marcellus praetor 216 BC
- Appius Claudius Pulcher praetor 215
- Publius Cornelius Lentulus praetor 214
- C. Sulpicius praetor 211 BC
- Marcus Cornelius Cethegus praetor 211 BC
- Lucius Cincius Alimentus praetor 210 BC
- Sextus Julius Caesar praetor 208 BC
- C. Mamilius (Atellus) praetor 207 BC
- C. Servilius (Geminus) praetor 206 BC
- Lucius Aemilius Papus praetor 205 BC
- Marcus Pomponius Matho praetor 204 BC
- Publius Villius Tappulus praetor 203 BC
- Gnaeus Tremelius Flaccus praetor 202 BC
- Publius Aelius Tubero praetor 201 BC
- Quintus Fulvius Gillo praetor 200 BC
- Lucius Valerius Flaccus praetor 199 BC
- M. Claudius Marcellus praetor 198 BC
- Lucius Manlius Vulso praetor 197 BC
- Gaius Laelius praetor 196 BC
- Gnaeus Manlius Vulso praetor 195 BC
- Gnaeus Cornelius Blasio praetor 194 BC
- Lucius Cornelius Scipio Asiaticus praetor 193 BC
- Lucius Valerius Tappo praetor 192 BC
- Marcus Aemilius Lepidus praetor 191 BC
- Gaius Atinius Labeo praetor 190 BC
- Marcus Sempronius Tuditanus praetor 189 BC
- Quintus Marcius Philippus praetor 188 BC
- L. Terentius Massaliota praetor 187 BC
- Publius Cornelius Sulla praetor 186 BC
- [5 possible men] praetor 185 BC
- Gaius Sempronius Blaesus praetor 184 BC
- Sp. Postumius Albinus (Paullulus) praetor 183 BC
- Lucius Caecilius Denter praetor 182 BC
- Tiberius Claudius Nero praetor 181 BC
- Publius Cornelius Mammula praetor 180 BC
- Quintus Mucius Scaevola praetor 179 BC
- (?) C. Cluvius Saxula praetor (?) 178 BC
- C. Numisius praetor 177 BC
- Lucius Aquilius Gallus praetor 176 BC
- L. Claudius praetor 174 BC
- M. Furius Crassipes praetor 173 BC
- C. Memmius praetor 172 BC
- Gaius Caninius Rebilus praetor 171 BC
- Servius Cornelius Lentulus praetor 169 BC
- Marcus Aebutius Helva praetor 168 BC
- Tiberius Claudius Nero praetor 167 BC
- (?) P. Quinctilius Varus praetor 166 BC
- Quintus Fabius Maximus Aemilianus praetor 149 BC
- Publius Cornelius Scipio Aemilianus Africanus procos. 146 BC
- (L.?) Cornelius Lentulus praetor 136 BC
- Lucius Plautius Hypsaeus praetor 135 BC (?)
- Manlius praetor 134 BC (?)
- M. Perperna praetor 133 BC
- L. Calpurnius Piso Frugi
- T. Annius Rufus praetor 131 BC
- T. Quinctius Flamininus praetor 126 BC
- Marcus Papirius Carbo praetor 114 BC (?)
- Quintus Caecilius Metellus Numidicus praetor 112 BC (?)
- L. Hortensius praetor 111 BC (?)
- Publius Licinius Nerva praetor 104 BC
- L. Licinius Lucullus propraetor 103 BC
- C. Servilius praetor 102 BC
- Lucius Domitius Ahenobarbus praetor 97 BC
- Gaius Claudius Pulcher praetor 95 BC
- L. (Sempronius) Asellio praetor between 96 & 92 BC
- C. Norbanus (Balbus or "Pulbus") praetor 90 BC (?)
- M. Perperna praetor 82 BC
- Marcus Aemilius Lepidus propraetor 80 BC
- Lucius Cornelius Sisenna propraetor 77 BC (?)
- Sex. Peducaeus propraetor 76, 75 BC
- C. Licinius Sacerdos praetor 75 BC
- Publius Cornelius Lentulus Sura proconsul 74 BC
- Gaius Verres propraetor 73—71 BC
- Quintus Arrius propraetor 71 BC
- Lucius Caecilius Metellus propraetor 70 BC
- Gaius Vergilius Balbus propraetor 61-58 BC
- L. Caecilius Rufus propraetor 56 BC (?)
- Marcus Porcius Cato propraetor 49 BC

== Imperial governors of Sicily ==
- L. Sestius Quirinus — reign of Augustus
- L. Mussidius (Longus?) — reign of Augustus
- (Cornelius) Sisenna — reign of Augustus
- Quintus Terentius Culleo — reign of Augustus
- Quintus Junius Blaesus — ante AD 10
- L. Clodius Rufus — between 2 BC and AD 14
- L. Seius — reign of Augustus
- P. F[lavius] Silvanus — reign of Tiberius
- Alfidius Sabinus
- Publius Plautius Pulcher — between 13 BC and AD 14
- Aulus Didius Gallus — between AD 21 and 38
- M. Haterius Candidus
- Cascellius
- C. Asinius Tucurianus — between AD 50 and 100
- Titus Junius Montanus — ante 81
- ? Terentius Priscus — reign of Domitian
- Senecio Memmius Afer — 97/98
- Marcus Pompeius Macrinus Neos Theophanes — 113/114
- Lucius Burbuleius Optatus Ligarianus — 130/131
- Publius Cluvius Maximus Paullinus — 133/134
- Junius Julianus — reign of Trajan or Hadrian ?
- Quintus Caecilius Marcellus — reign of Hadrian
- Gaius Curtius Justus — ?146/147
- Publius Septimius Geta — ?187/188
- Lucius Septimius Severus — 189/190
- Q. Pompeius Balbus
- C. Bultius Geminius Titianus — end 2nd century/beginning 3rd century
- C. Fulvius Maximus (might be proconsul or proconsular legate) — reign of Elagabalus or Severus Alexander
- Quintus Lusius Laberius — reign of Commodus? (CIL X, 7018)
- Marcus Marius Titius Rufinus — ante 235
- Marcus Domitius Valerianus — ?233/234
- Quintianus — AD 251
- M. Veturius Veturianus
- Gaius Mevius Donatus Junianus
- Q. Aquillius Niger — 3rd century
- Q. Annius Annianus Postumianus (CIL VI, 1338)

== See also ==
- Lists of ancient Roman governors
