= List of governors of Kongo Central =

Kongo Central in the Democratic Republic of the Congo

This list of governors of Kongo Central includes governors of the Kongo Central Province, Democratic Republic of the Congo, in the period from when it was formed on 14 August 1962 from part of Léopoldville Province to the present. It has taken the names Congo Central from 14 August 1962, Bas-Zaïre from 27 October 1971, Bas-Congo in 1997 and its current name of Kongo Central in 2015.

== Congo Central (1962–1972) ==
The governors (or equivalent) of Congo Central were:

Province	Start	End	Officeholder	Title
Congo Central	6 September 1962	3 January 1967	Vital Faustin Moanda (b. 1923)	President, from 1965 governor
Congo Central	3 January 1967	30 August 1967	Denis Paluku (1936–2014)	Governor
Congo Central	30 August 1967	9 August 1968	François Luakabwanga	Governor
Congo Central	9 August 1968	5 August 1969	Bruno Ndala	Governor
Congo Central	5 August 1969	23 December 1970	Anaclet Kaniki	Governor
Congo Central	23 December 1970	24 February 1972	Dieudonné Boji	Governor

== Bas-Zaïre (1972–1997) ==
The governors (or equivalent) of Bas-Zaïre were:

Province	Start	End	Officeholder	Title
Bas-Zaïre	24 February 1972	17 July 1972	Marcel Derikoye Tita Ngindu	Governor
Bas-Zaïre	17 July 1972	21 May 1975	Catherine Nzuzi wa Mbombo (f) (b. 1944)	Commissioner
Bas-Zaïre	1975	1976	Loposo Nzela Balombe	Commissioner
Bas-Zaïre	4 February 1976	11 July 1977	Efambe Ey'Olanga	Commissioner
Bas-Zaïre	11 July 1977	21 January 1978	Ilunga Mubabinge Mukala	Commissioner
Bas-Zaïre	21 January 1978	18 January 1980	Tshiamala Tshingombe	Commissioner
Bas-Zaïre	18 January 1980	27 August 1980	Makolo Jibikilayi	Governor (1st time)
Bas-Zaïre	27 August 1980	10 October 1981	Zamundu Agenong'Ka	Governor
Bas-Zaïre	10 October 1981	18 January 1983	Malumba Mbangula	Governor
Bas-Zaïre	18 January 1983	1986	Makolo Jibikilayi	Governor (2nd time)
Bas-Zaïre	1986	20 July 1988	Tshala Muana	Governor
Bas-Zaïre	20 July 1988	1989	Kakule Mbahingana (1947–2011)	Governor
Bas-Zaïre	1989	1990	Mpambia Musanga Bekaja (b. 1935)	Governor
Bas-Zaïre	1990	1991	Timothée Moleka Nzulama (b. 1955?)	Governor
Bas-Zaïre	1991	1997	Bieya Mbaki (d. 1997)	Governor

== Bas-Congo (1997–2015) ==
The governors (or equivalent) of Bas-Congo were:

Province	Start	End	Officeholder	Title
Bas-Congo		1997	Mvuma Ngeti	Governor (acting for Mbaki)
Bas-Congo	1997		Mvuma Ngeti	Governor (interim)
Bas-Congo	1997 (4 days)		Joseph Mbenza Thubi	Governor
Bas-Congo	1997 (1 month)		Liwanga Mata Nyamunyobo	Governor
Bas-Congo	*Oct 1997	1998	Léonard Fuka Unzola (b. 1935)	Governor
Bas-Congo	1999	June 2001*	Séraphin Bavuidi Babingi (b. 1946)	Governor
Bas-Congo	*Oct 2001	16 October 2006	César Tsasa-di-Ntumba (1945?–2008)	Governor (interim for 4 months in 2001)
Bas-Congo	16 October 2006	24 February 2007	Jacques Mbadu (d. 2018)	Governor (1st time)
Bas-Congo	24 February 2007	19 March 2012	Simon Mbatshi Batshia (b. 1949)	Governor
Bas-Congo	19 March 2012	28 January 2013	Déo Nkusu	Governor (acting)
Bas-Congo	28 January 2013	19 July 2018	Jacques Mbadu	Governor (2nd time)

== Kongo Central (2015 – present) ==
The governors (or equivalent) of Kongo Central were:

Province	Start	End	Officeholder	Title
Kongo Central	19 July 2018		Atou Matubuana Nkuluki (b. 1966)	Governor (acting to 9 May 2019)
Kongo Central	7 September 2019	30 November 2019	Marcel Matumpa	Governor (acting for Matubuana)

== See also ==
- Lists of provincial governors of the Democratic Republic of the Congo
