= List of Roman governors of Cappadocia =

This is a list of known governors of the Roman province of Cappadocia. It was created in AD 17 as an imperial consular province by the Emperor Tiberius, following the death of king Archelaus. The Pontic and Armenian territories were split off by Diocletian during his reorganization of the empire during the 290s, and the province was reduced to the region of Cappadocia proper. In the late 330s, the eastern half of the province was split off to form the provinces of Armenia Prima and Armenia Secunda. In 371, emperor Valens split off the south-western region around Tyana, which became Cappadocia Secunda under a praeses, while the remainder became Cappadocia Prima under a consularis. In the period 535-553, under emperor Justinian I, Cappadocia Prima and Secunda were reunited under a proconsul, and eventually this province became the themata of Anatolikon and Armeniakon sometime during the seventh century. Many of the dates listed are approximate dates the office was held.

== Julio-Claudian dynasty ==
- Quintus Veranius—c. AD 18
- Iulius Paelignus—51-52
- Gnaeus Domitius Corbulo—55-61
- Lucius Caesennius Paetus—61-62
- Gnaeus Domitius Corbulo—63/64-65/66

== Flavian dynasty ==
- ? Marcus Ulpius Trajanus—70/71-72/73
- Gnaeus Pompeius Collega—73/74-76/77
- Marcus Hirrius Fronto Neratius Pansa—77/78-79/80
- Aulus Caesennius Gallus—80/81-82/83
- ? Publius Valerius Patruinus—83/84-85/86
- Tiberius Julius Candidus Marius Celsus—89/90-91/92
- Lucius Antistius Rusticus—92/93-93/94
- Lucius Caesennius Sospes—93/94
- Titus Pomponius Bassus—94/95-99/100
- Quintus Orfitasius Aufidius Umber—100/101-103/104
- Publius Calvisius Ruso Julius Frontinus—104/105-106/107
- Gaius Julius Quadratus Bassus—107/108-110/111

== After creation of the province of Galatia ==
- Marcus Junius Homullus—111/112-113/114
- Lucius Catilius Severus Julianus Claudius Reginus—114/5-116/117
- Gaius Bruttius Praesens Lucius Fulvius Rusticus—121/122-123/124
- (? Lucius) Statorius Secundus—124/125-126/127
- Titus Prifernius Geminus—127/128-129/130
- Lucius Flavius Arrianus—130/131-136/137
- Lucius Burbuleius Optatus Ligarianus—between 137 and 141
- Publius Cassius Secundus—c. 141-c. 144
- Lucius Aemilius Carus—c. 148-c. 151
- Marcus Cassius Apollinaris—c. 151-c. 154
- Marcus Sedatius Severianus—c. 157-161/162
- Marcus Statius Priscus Licinius Italicus—162-c. 163
- Lucius Julius Statilius Severus—c. 163-c. 166
- Publius Martius Verus—166-175
- Gaius Arrius Antoninus—175-c. 177
- Caelius Calvinus—c. 184
- Gaius Julius Flaccus Aelianus—c. 198
- L. M[...]ius—c. 199
- Claudius Hieronymianus—c. 212
- Quintus Atrius Clonius—between 211 and 222
- Gaius Catius Clemens—217-218
- Marcus Munatius Sulla Cerialis—218
- Marcus Ulpius Ofellus Theodorus—219-221
- Aurelius Basileus—221-222
- Asinius Lepidus—222/223—224/225
- (? P.) Aradius Paternus—c. 231
- Quintus Julius Proculeianus—c. 231, successor of Paternus
- Licinnius Serenianus—c. 235
- Sextus Catius Clementinus Priscillianus—236/237—237/238
- T.(?) Cuspidius Flaminius Severus—238/239—239/240
- Titus Clodius Saturninus Fidus—240/241—242/243
- Marcus Antonius Memmius Hiero—243/244—245/246
- Publius Petronius Polianus—246/247—248/249
- Aulus Vergilius Maximus—251—253

== See also ==
- Lists of ancient Roman governors
