= Gallia Belgica =

Roman province (22 BC - 5th century)

Belgic Gaul
- Province of the Roman Empire
- 22 BC–5th century
- Capital: Durocortorum (Reims); Augusta Treverorum (Trier)
- Historical era: Antiquity
  - Established after the Gallic Wars: 22 BC
  - Ended with Frankish Kingdoms: 5th century

Gallia Belgica ("Belgic Gaul") was a province of the Roman Empire located in the north-eastern part of Roman Gaul, in what is today primarily northern France, Belgium, and Luxembourg, along with parts of the Netherlands and Germany.

Before the Roman province came into existence in about 50 BC, the region was conquered by Julius Caesar during his Gallic Wars. His report, the Commentarii de Bello Gallico, described Belgic Gaul as one of the three parts of Gaul (Tres Galliæ), the other two being Gallia Aquitania and Gallia Lugdunensis. Belgica stretched from the Marne and Seine rivers, which Caesar described as a cultural boundary between the Belgae and the Celtic Gauls. In the north and east it stretched all the way to the Rhine. The official Roman province of this name was later created by emperor Augustus in 22 BC, and named after the Belgae, as the largest tribal confederation in the area. However, it also included the territories of the Treveri, Mediomatrici, Leuci, Sequani, and others who Caesar did not explicitly designate as Belgic.

The province was re-organised several times, first increased and later decreased in size. Diocletian brought the northeastern Civitas Tungrorum into Germania Inferior, joining the Rhineland colonies. The remaining part of Gallia Belgica was divided into Belgica Prima (in the eastern area of the Treveri, Mediomatrici and Leuci, around Luxembourg and the Ardennes), and Belgica Secunda (between the English Channel and the upper Meuse).

The capital of Belgica Prima, Trier, became an important late western Roman capital.

== Roman conquest ==
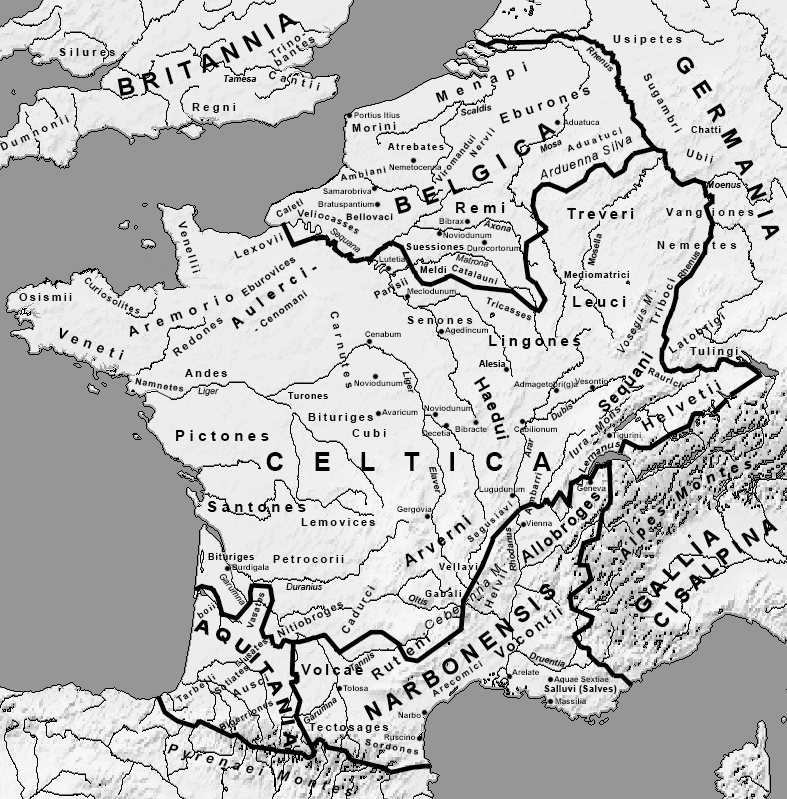
Gallia Belgica at the time of Julius Caesar's conquest of Gaul in 54 BCE

In 57 BC, Julius Caesar led the conquest of northern Gaul, and already specified that the part to the north of the Seine and Marne rivers was inhabited by a people or alliance known as the Belgae. This definition became the basis of the later Roman province of Belgica. Caesar said that the Belgae were separated from the Celtic Gauls to their south by "language, custom and laws" (lingua, institutis, legibus) but he did not go into detail, except to mention that he learnt from his contacts that the Belgae had some ancestry from east of the Rhine, which he referred to as Germania. Indeed, the Belgian tribes closest to the Rhine he distinguished as the Germani cisrhenani. (Strabo stated that the differences between the Celts and Belgae, in language, politics and way of life was a small one.) Modern historians interpret Caesar and the archaeological evidence as indicating that the core of the Belgian alliance was in the present-day northernmost corner of France; the Suessiones, Viromandui and Ambiani as well perhaps as some of their neighbours who lived in the area, Caesar identified as Belgium or Belgica. These were the leaders of the initial military alliance he confronted, and they were also more economically advanced (and therefore less "Germanic" according to Caesar's way of seeing things) than many of their more northerly allies such as the Nervii and Germani Cisrhenani.

Apart from the southern Remi, all the Belgic tribes allied against the Romans, angry at the Roman decision to garrison legions in their territory during the winter. At the beginning of the conflict, Caesar reported the allies' combined strength at 288,000, led by the Suessione king, Galba. Due to the Belgic coalition's size and reputation for uncommon bravery, Caesar avoided meeting the combined forces of the tribes in battle. Instead, he used cavalry to skirmish with smaller contingents of tribesmen. Only when Caesar managed to isolate one of the tribes did he risk conventional battle. The tribes fell in a piecemeal fashion and Caesar claimed to offer lenient terms to the defeated, including Roman protection from the threat of surrounding tribes. Most tribes agreed to the conditions. A series of uprisings followed the 57 BC conquest. The largest revolt was led by the Bellovaci in 52 BC, after the defeat of Vercingetorix. During this rebellion, it was the Belgae who avoided direct conflict. They harassed the Roman legions, led personally by Caesar, with cavalry detachments and archers. The rebellion was put down after a Bellovaci ambush of the Romans failed. The revolting party was slaughtered.

== Formation under Augustus ==
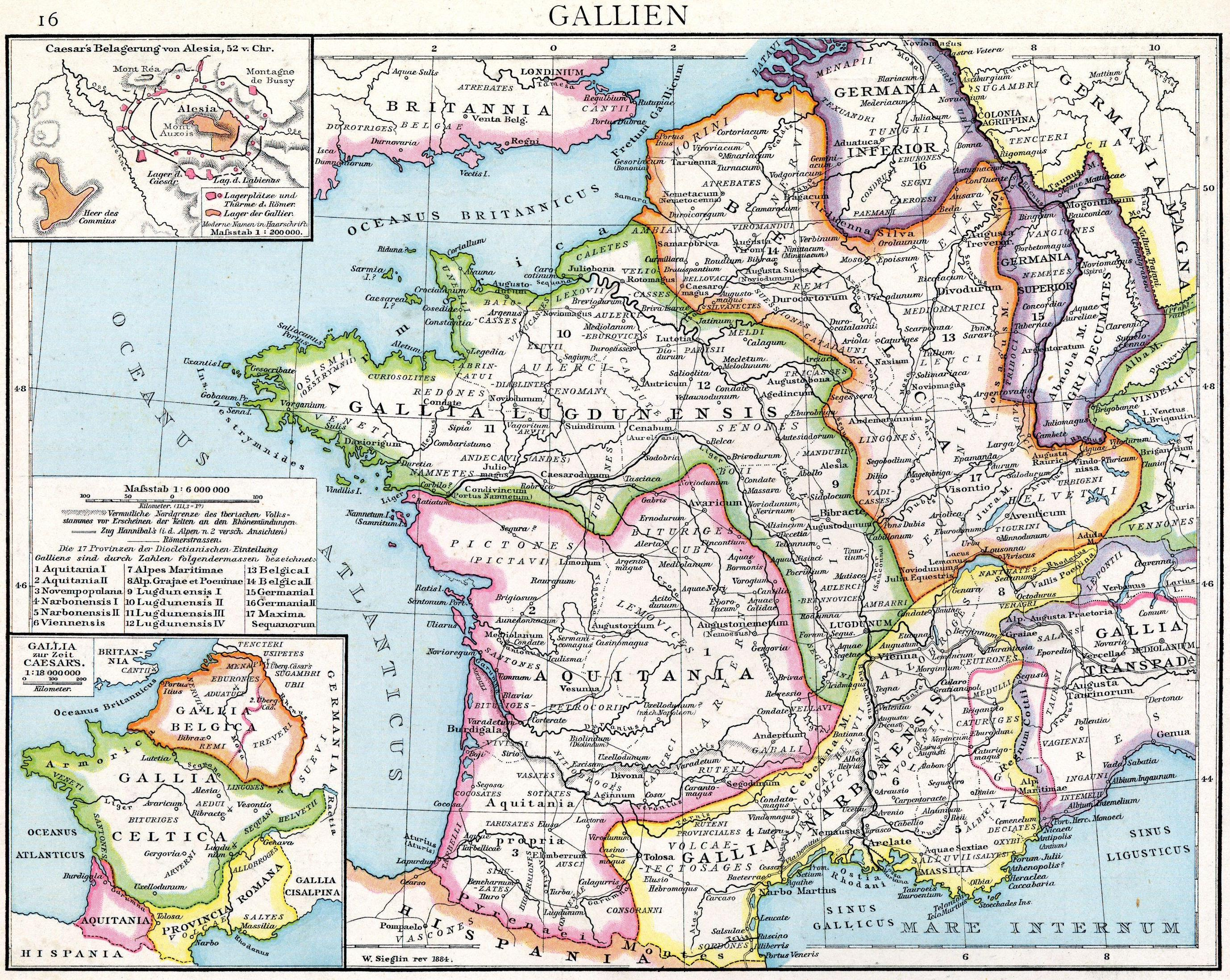
Map of Roman Gaul with Belgica in orange (Droysens Allgemeiner historischer Handatlas, 1886)

Following a census of the region in 27 BC, Augustus ordered a restructuring of the provinces in Gaul. Therefore, in 22 BC, Marcus Agrippa split Gaul (or Gallia Comata) into three regions (Gallia Aquitania, Gallia Lugdunensis and Gallia Belgica). Agrippa made the divisions on what he perceived to be distinctions in language, race and community – Gallia Belgica was meant to be a mix of Celtic and Germanic peoples. The capital of this territory was Reims, according to the geographer Strabo, though later the capital moved to modern-day Trier. The date of this move is uncertain.

Modern historians however view the term 'Gaul' and its subdivisions as a "product of faulty ethnography" and see the split of Gallia Comata into three provinces as an attempt to construct a more efficient government, as opposed to a cultural division. Successive Roman emperors struck a balance between Romanizing the people of Gallia Belgica and allowing pre-existing culture to survive.

The Romans divided the province into four civitates, corresponding generally to ancient tribal boundaries. The capital cities of these districts included modern Cassel (replaced by Tournai as Menapian civitas), Bavay (replaced by Cambrai as Nervian civitas), Thérouanne, Arras, Saint-Quentin, Soissons, Reims, Beauvais, Amiens, Tongeren, Trier, Toul and Metz. These civitates were in turn were divided into smaller units, pagi, a term that became the French word "pays".

Roman government was run by Concilia in Reims or Trier. Additionally, local notables from Gallia Belgica were required to participate in a festival in Lugdunum (modern Lyon), which typically celebrated or worshipped the emperor's genius. The gradual adoption of Romanized names by local elites and the Romanization of laws under local authority demonstrate the effectiveness of this concilium Galliarum. With that said, the concept and community of Gallia Belgica did not predate the Roman province, but developed from it.

== Under the emperors ==
The Roman Empire in the time of Hadrian (ruled 117-138 AD), showing, in northeastern Gaul, the imperial province of Gallia Belgica (Belgium/Picardie/Champagne)

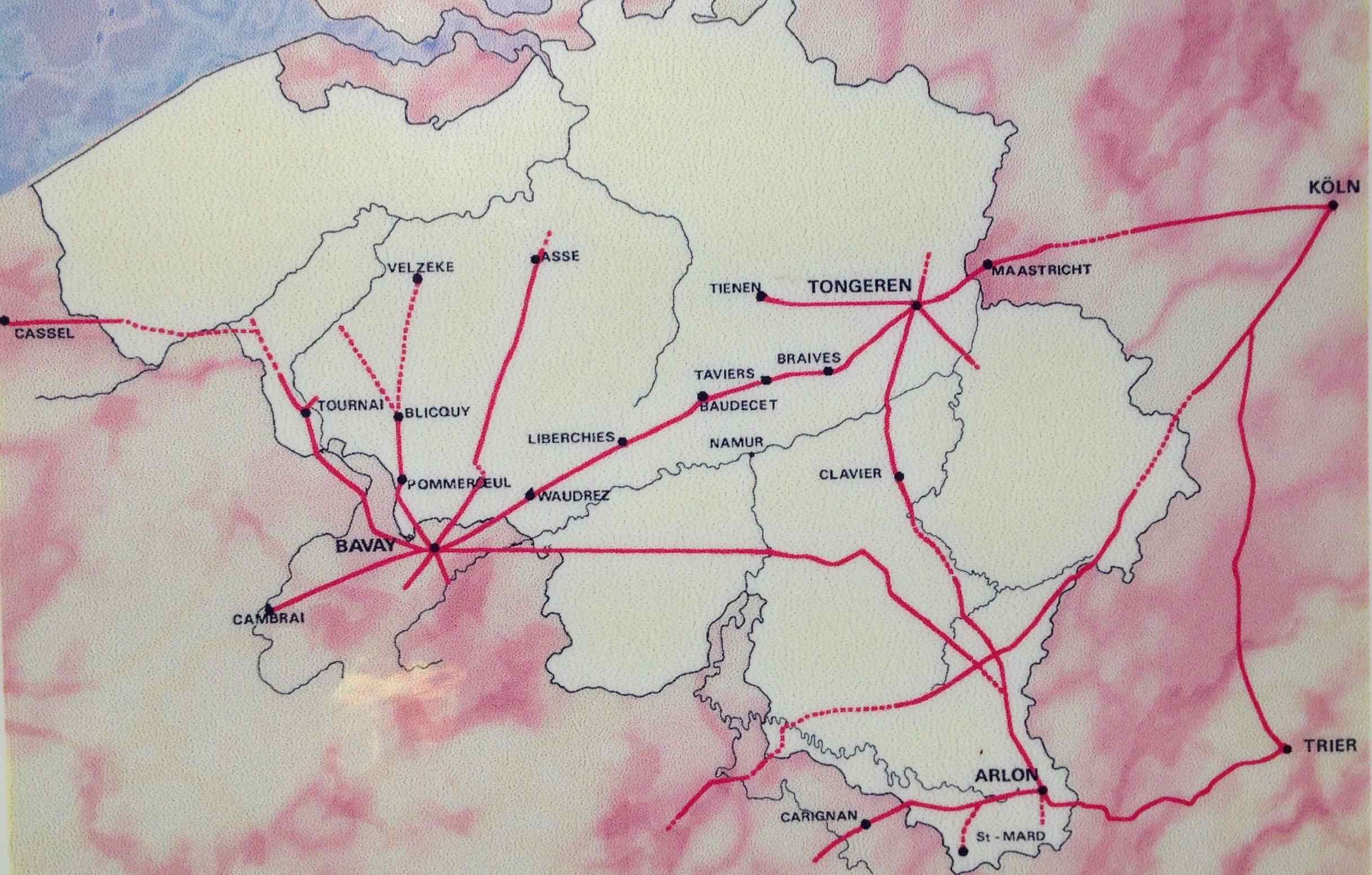
Roman roads in Belgium

=== Reform of Domitian (around 90) ===
During the 1st century AD (estimated date 90 AD), the provinces of Gaul were restructured. Emperor Domitian reorganized the provinces in order to separate the militarized zones of the Rhine from the civilian populations of the region. The northeastern part of Gallia Belgica was split off and renamed Germania Inferior, later to be reorganized and renamed as Germania Secunda. This included the eastern part of modern Belgium, the southernmost part of the modern Netherlands, and a part of modern Germany. The eastern part was split off to become Germania Superior (parts of western Germany and eastern France) and the southern border of Gallia Belgica was extended to the south. The newer Gallia Belgica included the cities of Camaracum (Cambrai), Nemetacum (Arras), Samarobriva (Amiens), Durocortorum (Reims), Dividorum (Metz) and Augusta Treverorum (Trier).

=== Attack by the Chauci (173) ===
In 173, the later emperor Didius Julianus, then governor of Gallia Belgica, had to repel a serious invasion of the Chauci, a Germanic tribe that lived along the shores of the Wadden Sea at the respective northern and northwestern coast of present-day Netherlands and Germany. The attack occurred in the drainage basin of the river Scheldt (present-day Flanders and Hainaut). Archaeologists have found evidence that large farms near Tournai and the village Velzeke (near Ghent) had to be abandoned. Further the capitals in the areas of the former tribes of the Atrebates, Morini and the Nervians were either burnt down (Nemetacum (Arras)) or had to be rebuilt in the last quarter of the second century, Colonia Morinorum (Thérouanne) and Bagacum Nerviorum (Bavay).

=== Crisis of the 3rd century and Gallic Empire ===
With the Crisis of the Third Century and the partition of the Empire, Roman control over Gaul deteriorated in the 3rd century. In 260, Postumus became emperor of a breakaway Gallic Empire. He proved able to stop the incursions from the Franks. Only in 274 was Roman control restored by the new emperor Aurelian in the Battle of Châlons. The cost of this defeat in the long run proved very high indeed. With the Gallic army defeated and not returning to the Rhine border, the Franks overran the neighbouring province of Germania Inferior. The Rhineland (to the Ripuarian Franks) and the area between the Rhine and the main road between Boulogne and Cologne, present-day South Holland, Zeeland, Flanders, Brabant and Limburg, the last three in both the present-day Netherlands and Belgium (to the Salian Franks) were de facto lost forever for the Roman empire. This gave the Salian Franks a base from which they could expand some 130 years later, beginning after the disastrous Rhine crossing in 406, to conquer the whole area of the former province of Gallia Belgica and start the Merovingian kingdom.

=== Reform of Diocletian (around 300) ===
Emperor Diocletian restructured the provinces around 300, and split Belgica into two provinces: Belgica Prima and Belgica Secunda. Belgica Prima had Augusta Treverorum (Trier) as its main city, and consisted of the eastern part. The border between Belgica Prima and Belgica Secunda was approximately along the Meuse.

=== Prosperous fourth century ===
The eastern part of Gallia Belgica, especially the valley of the Moselle became very prosperous in the fourth century, particularly in the decades that Augusta Treverorum (Trier) was the capital of the Western Roman Empire. The Roman poet Ausonius wrote a famous poem on the Moselle.

== Germanic conquests (after 406) ==
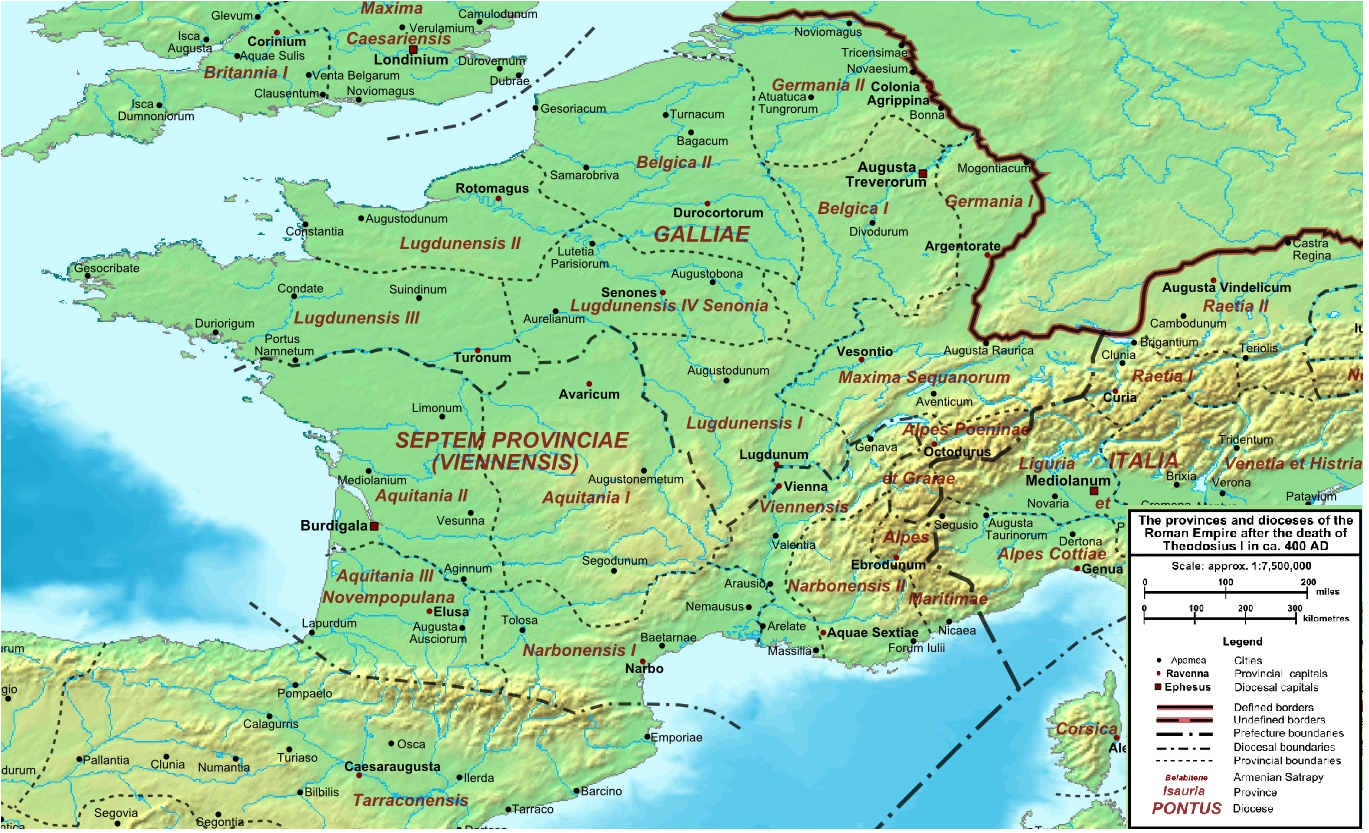
The Provinces of Gaul, c. 400 AD

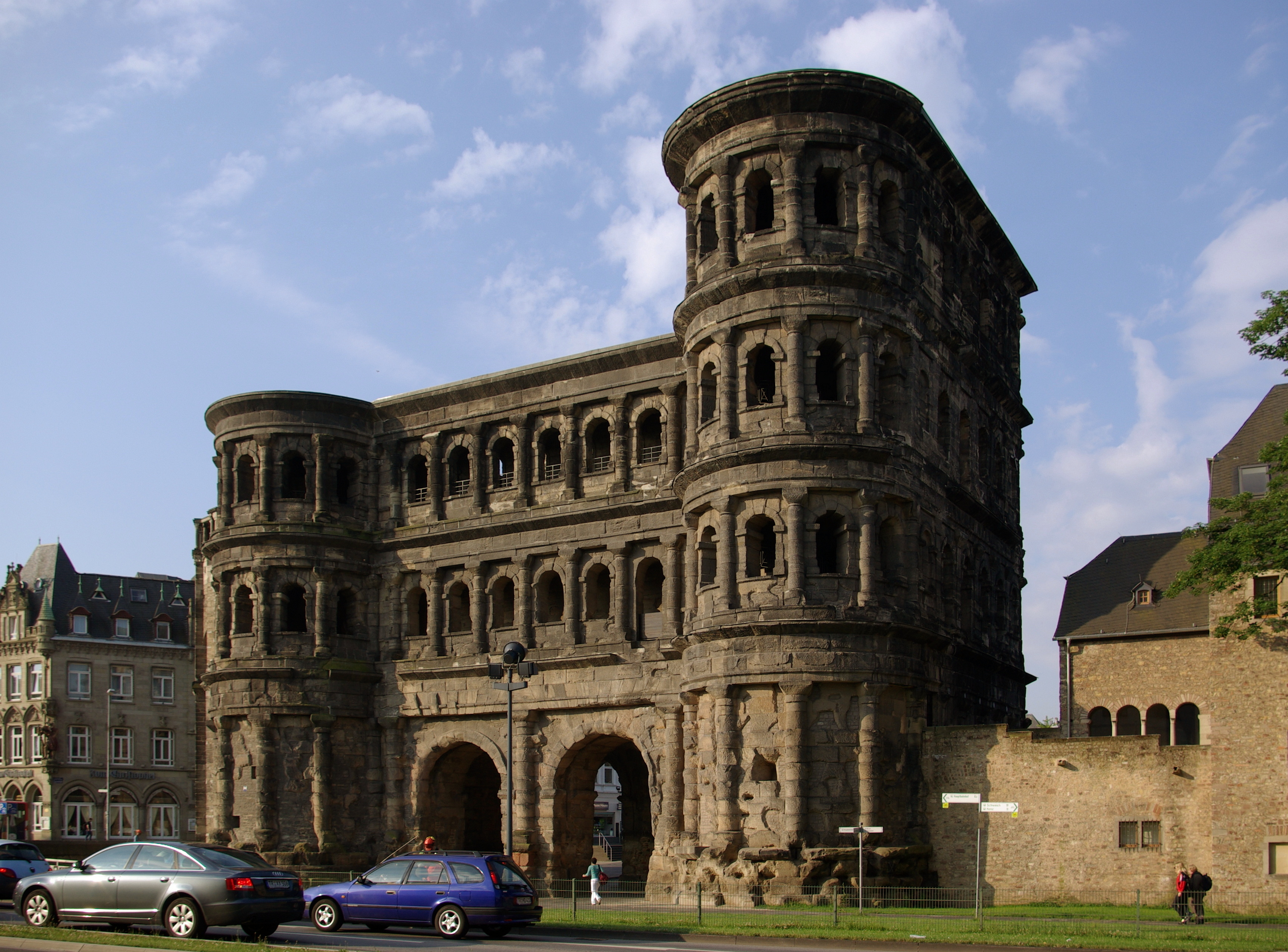
The Porta Nigra of Trier, capital of Gallia Belgica, constructed between 186 and 200 AD

Around 350 Salian Franks who were already living in Batavia were settled in Texandria. Texandria was most likely for a large part overlapping with the area now known as the Kempen.

Eventually, in 406, a large alliance among the Vandals, Alans and Suebi, under great pressure from the Huns, after first having been defeated by the Ripuarian Franks in the neighbourhood of Cologne in Germania Inferior, successfully crossed the Rhine in the neighbourhood of present-day Koblenz and entered Gallia Belgica by way of the Moselle valley. They subsequently destroyed large parts of Gallia Belgica, before eventually moving on to Hispania (present-day Spain). This invasion and the accompanying widespread destruction broke the backbone of Roman power in at least the northern part of Gallia Belgica. After this invasion the Franks were able to conquer valuable agricultural land south of the Via Belgica, the very important main road between Cologne and Boulogne, that had been the backbone of Roman defence strategy between 260 and 406.

In 452, a major battle was fought at the Catalaunian fields (between the Seine and the Moselle). A coalition of Romans, Visigoths and Franks fought an army led by the legendary Hunnic leader Attila. The outcome of this battle itself was inconclusive, but as a consequence of this battle the Huns and their allies left the area of Gallia Belgica, where they had plundered nearly all major cities, except Paris.

After the Western Roman Empire had already collapsed in Galla Belgica for some time the Gallo-Roman "Kingdom of Soissons" (457–486) managed to maintain control over the area around Soissons. The Franks however emerged victorious and Belgica Secunda in the 5th century became the centre of Clovis' Merovingian kingdom. During the 8th century in the Carolingian Empire the former area of Gallia Belgica was split into Neustria (roughly Belgica Secunda, main cities Paris, Reims) and Austrasia (roughly Belgica Prima and Germania Inferior, main cities Trier, Metz, Cologne). After the death of Charlemagne's son, Louis the Pious, the Carolingian Empire was divided by the Treaty of Verdun in 843. The three sons of Louis the Pious divided his territories into three kingdoms: East Francia (the forerunner of modern Germany), West Francia (west of the Scheldt river) a part of which (Île-de-France), from the middle of the 10th century became the kernel of modern France, and Middle Francia which was succeeded by Lotharingia. Though often presented as the dissolution of the Frankish empire, it was in fact the continued adherence to Salic patrimony. Lotharingia was divided in 870 by the Treaty of Meerssen under West and East Francia.

== Legacy ==
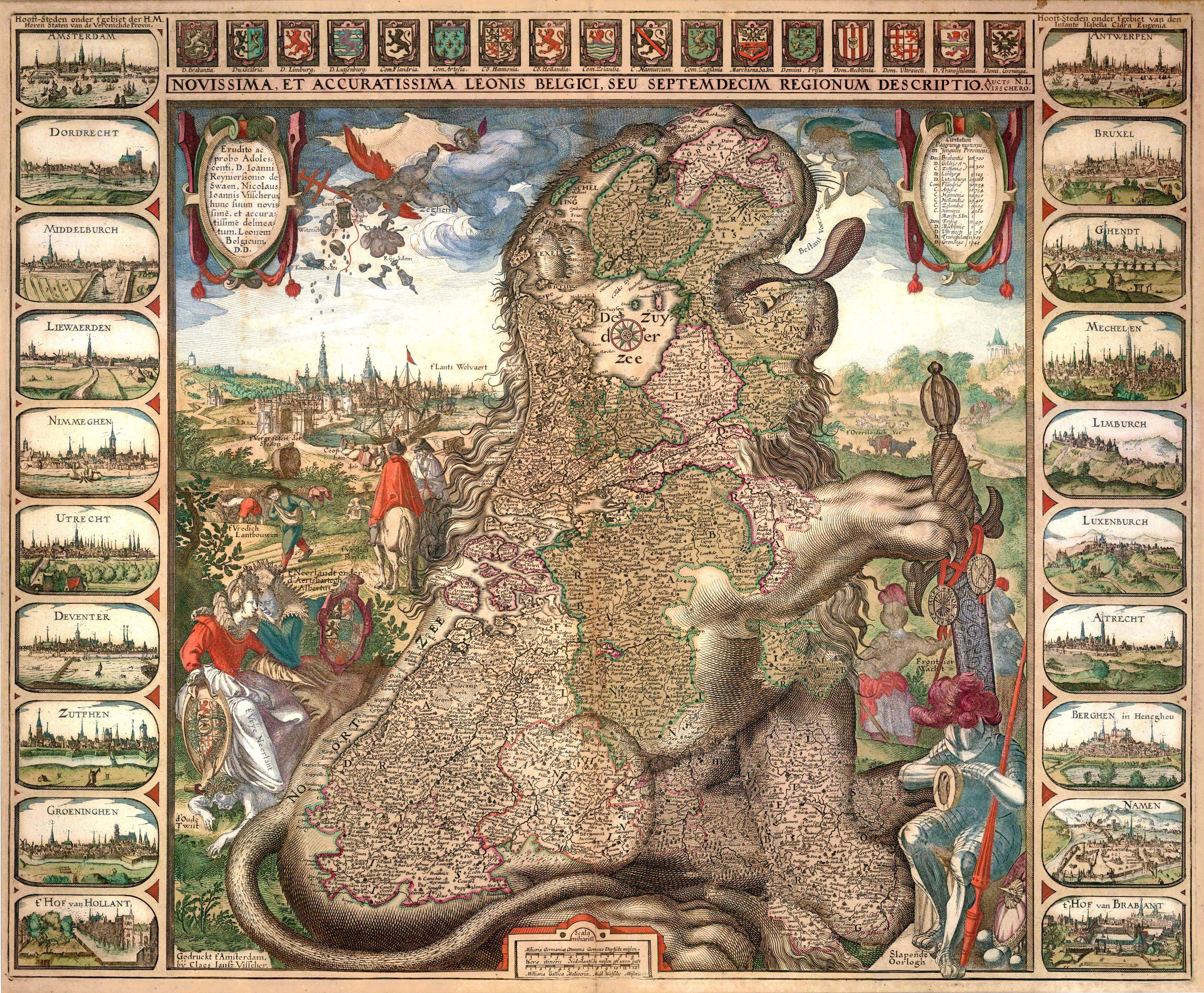
Representation of the Low Countries as Leo Belgicus by Claes Janszoon Visscher, 1611

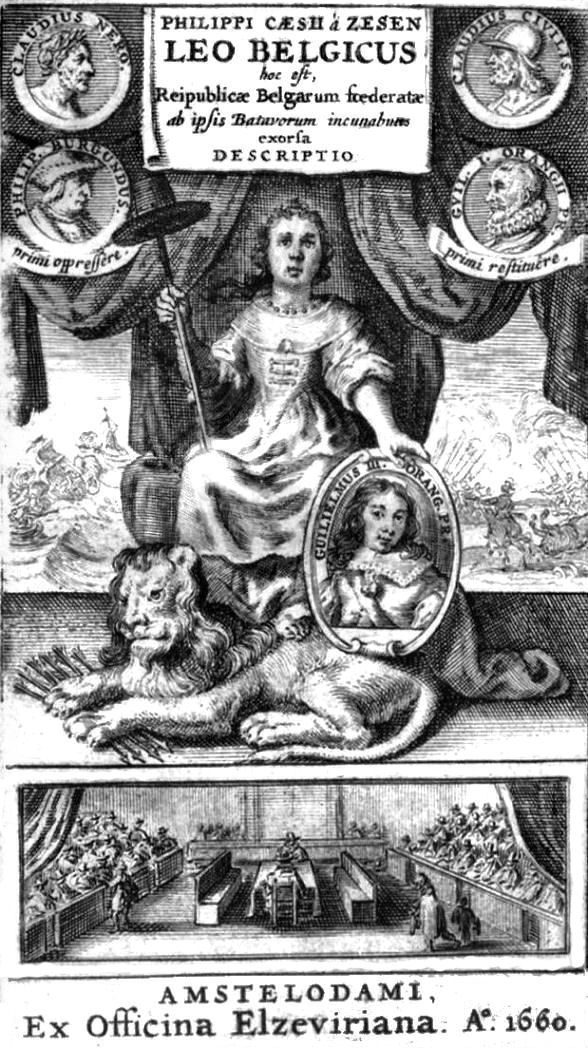
'Belgica Foederata' was the Latin name of the Dutch Republic.

The name Belgica continued to be used for the Low Countries as the Latin language name of the entire territory until the modern period. In the 1500s, the region was divided between the independent Belgica Foederata or the federal (northern) Netherlands and the Belgica Regia or the royal (southern) Netherlands under the Habsburgian crown. Belgica Foederata continued to be used from 1581 up to the French Revolution. Even after that, the United Kingdom of the Netherlands, created in 1815 was still known as Royaume des Belgiques, and it was only with the 1831 separatist revolution where the rebels took this name for their new country that it ceased to be used for the entirety of the region.

== See also ==
- List of Roman governors of Gallia Belgica
- Saxon shore
