= List of Roman governors of Noricum =

This is a list of Roman governors of Noricum. It was one of the imperial provinces, governed by an appointee of the emperor, originally one of the equites until around AD 180, then afterwards a member of the Roman Senate.

== Procurator Augustorum provinciae Noricae ==
- Gaius Baebius Atticus (under Claudius, between 41 and 54)
- Petronius Urbicus (spring 69)
- Publius Sextilius Felix (69-79)
- A. Trebonius (Garutianus?) (2nd half of 1st century AD)
- Lucius Clodius Justus Egnatius Priscus (c. 100)
- [T. or P.] Prifernius Paetus Memmius Apollinaris (c. 110)
- Quintus Caecilius Redditus (soon after 122)
- Claudius Paternus Clementianus (c. 125)
- Plautius Caesianus (c. 135)
- Gaius Censorius Niger (after 135)
- Caecilius Juventianus (between 138 and 161)
- Drusius Proculus (before 152)
- Quintus Lisinius Sabinus (before 152)
- Gaius Rasinius Silo (before 152)
- Gaius Antistius Auspex (before 152)
- [... P]robatus (c. 151)
- Titus Flavius Titianus (c. 152)
- Ulpius Victor (between 154 and 158)
- Usienus Secundus (c. 158)
- Marcus Bassaeus Rufus (c. 160)
- Aelius Maximus (between 161 and 169)
- Tiberius Claudius Priscianus (c. 168)
- Sextus Baius Pudens (170s)

== Legatus Augustorum (or Augusti) pro praetore provinicae Noricae ==
- Gaius Memmius Fidus Julius Albius (190/91)
- Marcus Juventius Surus Proculus (200/201)
- Pollienus Sebennus (205/206)
- Publius Catius Sabinus (206 to 208)
- Marcus Munatius Sulla Cerialis (before 215)
- Marcus Gnaeus Licinius Rufinus (under Severus Alexander; 222 to 235)
- Publius Cosinius Felix (before 250)
- Gaius Macrinius Decianus (c. 255)

== Agentes vices praesidis ==
- Aelius Restutus (last third of the 3rd century)
- M. Aurelius Marinus (last third of the 3rd century)
- M. Aurelius Julius (c. 276)

== See also ==
- Noricum
- Lists of ancient Roman governors
