= List of Roman governors of Arabia Petraea =

This is a list of known governors of the Arabia Petraea. Created in AD 106 following its annexation by the Roman emperor Trajan, it was governed by a senatorial legate until 262, when Gallienus transferred the governorship to equestrian Praesides. It returned to Senatorial appointees with the sole rule of Constantine I after 324, which continued until the province was lost in the 630s.

== Legati Augusti pro praetor Arabiae (106–262) ==
- Gaius Claudius Severus (107–116)
- Quintus Coredius Gallus Gargilius Antiquus (c. 118)
- Tiberius Julius Julianus Alexander (125)
- Lucius Aninius Sextius Florentinus (127)
- Titus Haterius Nepos (130)
- Lucius Aemilius Carus (141–142)
- Sextus Cocceius Severianus (145)
- Lucius Attidius Cornelianus (150–151)
- Gaius Allius Fuscianus (c. 160)
- Publius Julius Geminius Marcianus (162–163)
- Quintus Antistius Adventus (166–167)
- Lucius Claudius Modestus (between 167 and 169)
- [...] Severus (c. 177–c. 180)
- Quintus Flavius Julius Fronto (c. 181)
- Marcus Bassaeus Astur (between c. 188 and c. 195)
- Publius Aelius Severianus Maximus (193–194)
- Quintus Scribonius Tenax (between 194 and 196)
- Marcus Caecilius Fuscianus Crepereianus Floranus (before 198)
- Lucius Marius Perpetuus (200–c. 203)
- Quintus Aiacius Modestus Crescentianus (either between c. 198 and 200, or between 202 and 204)
- Aurelius Aurelianus (209–210)
- Quintus Scribonius Tenax
- Lucius Alfenus Avitianus (c. 212/215)
- Sextus Furnius Julianus (213–214)
- Quintus Flavius Balbus (between 213 and 220)
- Pica Caerianus (218)
- Gaius Furius Sabinus Aquila Timesitheus (vice praeses, acting in place of the legate, in 218 and again 222)
- Flavius Julianus (c. 219)
- Publius Plotius Romanus (between 211 and 222)
- Trebonius Fortunatus (c. 222)
- Caecilius Maximus (between 223 and 226)
- Claudius Sollemnius Pacatianus (between 223 and 230)
- Lucius Egnatius Victor Marinianus (? between 225 and 230)
- Pomponius Julianus (236)
- Decimus Simonius Proculus Julianus (c. 237/238)
- Marcus Domitius Valerianus (c. 238/239)
- Claudius Capitolinus (245–246)
- Caelius Felix (246–247)
- Marcus Aelius Aurelius Theo (between 253 and 259)
- Virius Lupus (before 259)
- [...]ius Gallonianus (259–260)
- Coc[...] Rufinus (? 261–262)
- Julianus (held post when two Augustii were ruling jointly)
- Erucius Clarus (uncertain date)
- Publius Pomponius Secundinus (uncertain date)
- Aelius (uncertain date)

== Equestrian Praesides Arabiae (262–324) ==
- Junius Olympus (262–263)
- Statilius Ammianus (263–264)
- Julius Heraclitus (between 265 and 273)
- Aurelius Antiochus (between 265 and 273)
- Flavius Aelianus (274–275)
- Aurelius Petrus (278–279)
- Aemillius Aemillianus (282–283)
- Domitius Antonius (between 284 and 293)
- Marcus Aurelius Aelianus (between 293 and 305)
- Aurelius Asclepiades (between 293 and 305)
- Aurelius Felicianus (between 293 and 305)
- Aurelius Gorgonius (between 293 and 305)
- Aelius Flavianus (date uncertain)

== Senatorial Praesides Arabiae (324–630) ==
- Flavius Antonius Hierocles (c. 343–344)
- Theodorus (346)
- Flavius Archelaus (c. 349–350)
- Andronicus (c. 356–357)
- Maximus (357–358)
- Belaeus (362–363)
- Ulpianus (364)
- Malchus (between 365 and 399)
- Flavius Bonus (392)
- Sabinianus (?– fourth or fifth century)
- Flavius Philocalus (?– fifth century)
- Flavius Arcadius Alexander (487)
- Hesychius (490)
- Flavius Elias (? – late fifth or early sixth century)

== See also ==
- Lists of ancient Roman governors
