= List of Roman governors of Gallia Belgica =

This is a list of Roman governors of Gallia Belgica. Capital and largest city of Gallia Belgica was Durocortum, modern-day Reims.

== Governors during the Principate ==
=== AD 69-96: Year of the Four Emperors and Flavian Dynasty ===
- AD 69-70: Decimus Valerius Asiaticus
- 94-97: Quintus Glitius Atilius Agricola

=== AD 96-192: Nervan-Antonian dynasty ===
- 97-99: Quintus Sosius Senecio
- AD 137-141: Tiberius Claudius Saturninus
- c. 159-c. 162: Aulus Junius Pastor Lucius Caesennius Sospes
- c. 166: Lucius Calpurnius Proculus
- c. 171-c. 175: Didius Julianus

=== AD 193-235: Year of the Five Emperors and Severan dynasty ===
- c. 180-c. 183: Gaius Sabucius Major Caecilianus
- Between 183 and 186, or 186 and 189: Lucius Calpurnius Proculus
- Between 200 and 203: Gaius Junius Faustinus Placidus Postumianus
- Between 200 and 204: Lucius Marius Maximus Perpetuus Aurelianus
- Between 202 and 209: Lucius Publius Postumus
- Between 222 and 224: Gaius Julius Apronius Maenius Pius Salamallianus

== See also ==
- Lists of ancient Roman governors
