= List of Colombian department governors =

This is a list of governors of departments of Colombia.

== Amazonas Department ==
- Governor of Amazonas Department (List)

== Antioquia Department ==
- Governor of Antioquia Department (List)

== Arauca Department ==
- Governor of Arauca Department (List)

== Atlántico Department ==
- Governor of Atlántico Department (List)

== Bolívar Department ==
- Governor of Bolívar Department (List)

== Boyacá Department ==
- Governor of Boyacá Department (List)

== Caldas Department ==
- Governor of Caldas Department (List)

== Caquetá Department ==
- Governor of Caquetá Department (List)

== Casanare Department ==
- Governor of Casanare Department (List)

== Cauca Department ==
- Governor of Cauca Department (List)

== Cesar Department ==
- Governor of Cesar Department (List)

== Chocó Department ==
- Governor of Chocó Department (List)

== Córdoba Department ==
- Governor of Córdoba Department (List)

== Cundinamarca Department ==
- Governor of Cundinamarca Department (List)

=== Bogotá ===
- Mayor of Bogotá (List)

== La Guajira Department ==
- Governor of La Guajira Department (List)

== Guainía Department ==
- Governor of Guainía Department (List)

== Guaviare Department ==
- Governor of Guaviare Department (List)

== Huila Department ==
- Governor of Huila Department (List)

== Magdalena Department ==
- Governor of Magdalena Department (List)

== Meta Department ==
- Governor of Meta Department (List)

== Nariño Department ==
- Governor of Nariño Department (List)

== Norte de Santander Department ==
- Governor of Norte de Santander Department (List)

== Putumayo Department ==
- Governor of Putumayo Department (List)

== Quindío Department ==
- Governor of Quindío Department (List)

== Risaralda Department ==
- Governor of Risaralda Department (List)

== San Andrés and Providencia Department ==
- Governor of San Andrés and Providencia Department (List)

== Santander Department ==
- Governor of Santander Department (List)

== Sucre Department ==
- Governor of Sucre Department (List)

== Tolima Department ==
- Governor of Tolima Department (List)

== Valle del Cauca Department ==
- Governor of Valle del Cauca Department (List)

== Vaupés Department ==
- Governor of Vaupés Department (List)

== Vichada Department ==
- Governor of Vichada Department (List)

== See also ==
- List of entities in the executive branch of Colombia
