= Nigerian state governors 2007–2011 term =

Nigerian state governors are normally elected for a four-year term during the national elections. In some cases, the first officeholder may be replaced by another, for example through death, impeachment or if an election is annulled. Following is a list of all Nigerian state governors who held office during the 2007–2011 term. Acting governors are not shown.

State	Governor	Party	Date elected	Notes
Abia	Theodore Orji	PDP	April 2007	First term
Adamawa	Murtala Nyako	PDP	April 2007	First term as elected governor. Election nullified February 2008. Reelected 29 April 2008.
Akwa Ibom	Godswill Akpabio	PDP	April 2007	First term
Anambra	Peter Obi	APGA	April 2007	Governor for about 9 months in 2003–2007 term. Reelected 6 February 2010 for a second term.
Bauchi	Isa Yuguda	ANPP	April 2007	First term
Bayelsa	Timipre Sylva	PDP	April 2007	First term. Election nullified 15 April 2008. Reelected 24 May 2008
Benue	Gabriel Suswam	PDP	April 2007	First term
Borno	Ali Modu Sheriff	ANPP	April 2007	reelected for second term
Cross River	Liyel Imoke	PDP	April 2007	First term
Delta	Emmanuel Uduaghan	PDP	April 2007	First term. Election annulled 9 November 2010. Reelected 6 January 2011
Ebonyi	Martin Elechi	PDP	April 2007	First term
Edo	Oserheimen Osunbor	PDP	April 2007	Election annulled on 20 March 2008
Edo	Adams Aliyu Oshiomle	AC	20 March 2008	Declared winner of April 2007 election on 20 March 2008
Ekiti	Olusegun Oni	PDP	April 2007	Election annulled 15 October 2010
Ekiti	Kayode Fayemi	AC	15 October 2010	Declared winner of 2009 rerun election on 15 October 2010
Enugu	Sullivan Chime	PDP	April 2007	First term
Gombe	Mohammed Danjuma Goje	PDP	April 2007	Reelected for second term
Imo	Ikedi Ohakim	PDP	April 2007	First term. Elected on PPA platform, switched to the PDP.
Jigawa	Sule Lamido	PDP	April 2007	First term
Kaduna	Namadi Sambo	PDP	April 2007	Appointed Vice President on 19 May 2010
Kaduna	Patrick Ibrahim Yakowa	PDP	20 May 2010	Formerly deputy governor, appointed governor on 20 May 2010
Kano	Ibrahim Shekarau	ANPP	April 2007	Reelected for second term
Katsina	Ibrahim Shema	PDP	April 2007	First term
Kebbi	Usman Saidu Nasamu Dakingari	PDP	April 2007	First term
Kogi	Ibrahim Idris	PDP	April 2007	Reelected for second term
Kwara	Bukola Saraki	PDP	April 2007	Reelected for second term
Lagos	Babatunde Fashola	AC	April 2007	First term
Nasarawa	Aliyu Doma	PDP	April 2007	First term
Niger	Mu'azu Babangida Aliyu	PDP	April 2007	First term
Ogun	Gbenga Daniel	PDP	April 2007	Reelected for second term
Ondo	Olusegun Agagu	PDP	April 2007	Reelected for second term. Election annulled in February 2009
Ondo	Olusegun Mimiko	LP	23 February 2009	Declared winner of April 2007 election on 23 February 2009
Osun	Olagunsoye Oyinlola	PDP	April 2007	Election annulled on 26 November 2010
Osun	Rauf Aregbesola	AC	26 November 2010	Declared winner of the April 2007 elections on 26 November 2010
Oyo	Christopher Alao-Akala	PDP	April 2007	As deputy, replaced impeached governor Rasheed Ladoja on 12 January 2006. Elected April 2007.
Plateau	Jonah David Jang	PDP	April 2007	First term as an elected governor
Rivers	Celestine Omehia	PDP	April 2007	Election annulled in October 2007 as not being the legitimate PDP candidate
Rivers	Rotimi Amaechi	PDP	October 2007	Declared governor after Celestine Omehia election was nullified
Sokoto	Aliyu Magatakarda Wamakko	PDP	April 2007	First term
Taraba	Danbaba Suntai	PDP	April 2007	First term
Yobe	Mamman Bello Ali	ANPP	April 2007	Died in office 27 January 2009
Yobe	Ibrahim Gaidam	ANPP	27 January 2009	Deputy, sworn in as governor on 27 January 2009
Zamfara	Mahmud Shinkafi	PDP	April 2007	First term. Elected on ANPP platform, moved to PDP

== See also ==
- Nigerian state governors 2011–2015 term
- Nigerian state governors 2003–2007 term
