= State governors in the Nigerian Second Republic (1979–1983) =

The Nigerian Second Republic was initiated on 1 October 1979 following elections initiated by the military head of state General Olusegun Obasanjo, with each state headed by an elected civilian governor. On 31 December 1983 General Muhammadu Buhari took power in a military coup, replacing the elected governors with military governors.
