= List of female state governors in Brazil =

Brazil's first female state governor was Roseana Sarney, elected in 1994 (and re-elected in 1998) as the chief executive of the state of Maranhão, representing the Brazilian Democratic Movement (PMDB). Other women have held governorships since then, either elected in their own right or appointed on an interim basis.

== Female governors ==
- Acre
  - Iolanda Fleming, 1986 – March 15, 1987
  - Mailza Gomes, PP, April 2, 2026 – incumbent
- Amapá
  - Dalva Figueiredo, April 5, 2002 – December 31, 2002
- Ceará
  - Izolda Cela, PDT, April 2, 2022 - December 31, 2022
- Distrito Federal
  - Maria de Lourdes Abadia, March 15, 2006 – December 31, 2006
  - Celina Leão, PP, March 30, 2026 – incumbent
- Maranhão
  - Roseana Sarney, PMDB, January 1, 1995 – April 6, 2002 and April 17, 2009 – December 10, 2014
- Pará
  - Ana Julia Carepa, PT, January 1, 2007 – December 31, 2010
  - Hana Ghassan, MDB, April 2, 2026 – incumbent
- Paraná
  - Cida Borghetti, PP, April 6, 2018 – December 31, 2018
- Pernambuco
  - Raquel Lyra, PSD, January 1, 2023 – incumbent
- Piauí
  - Regina Sousa, PT, March 31, 2022 – December 31, 2022
- Rio Grande do Norte
  - Wilma de Faria, PSB, January 1, 2003 – March 31, 2010
  - Rosalba Ciarlini, DEM, January 1, 2011 – December 31, 2014
  - Fátima Bezerra, PT, January 1, 2019 – incumbent
- Rio Grande do Sul
  - Yeda Crusius, PSDB, January 1, 2007 – December 31, 2010
- Rio de Janeiro
  - Benedita da Silva, PT, April 5, 2002 – December 31, 2002
  - Rosinha Garotinho, PMDB, January 1, 2003 – December 31, 2006
- Roraima
  - Suely Campos, PP, January 1, 2015 – December 10, 2018

== See also ==
- States of Brazil
