= List of Roman governors of Mauretania Caesariensis =

This is a list of known governors of Mauretania Caesariensis. It was one of the imperial provinces, governed by an appointee of the emperor, in this case a member of the equites. Some governors of Mauretania Caesariensis were also assigned to govern the neighboring province of Mauretania Tingitana; their names appear in bold.

Prefects of Mauretania Caesariensis
Date	Prefect
69	**Lucceius Albinus** (procurator Augusti pro legato)
c. 73 - 75	**Sextus Sentius Caecilianus** (legatus Augusti pro praetore ordinandae utriusque Mauretaniae)
c. 107	Titus Caesernius Statius Quinctius Macedo (procurator Augusti)
120 ? - 122	Lucius Seius Avitus (procurator Augusti pro legato)
between 128 and 131	[V]ettius Latro
c. 131	...]ganius Maximus (procurator Augusti)
c. 137	Gaius Petronius Celer (procurator Augusti)
143 ? - 145 ?	Titus Flavius Priscus Gallonius Fronto Quintus Marcius Turbo (procurator Augusti pro legato)
150	Porcius Vetustinus
c. 152	Titus Varius Clemens
165 - 168	Sextus Baius Pudens (procurator Augustorum)
173 ? - 176 ?	Tiberius Claudius Priscianus (procurator Augusti)
after 176	Publius Aelius Crispinus (procurator Augustorum pro legato)
between 184 and 191	Claudius Perpetuus (procurator Augusti)
c. 194/195	Gnaeus Nunnius Martial (procurator Augusti)
196 ? - 197 ?	Lucius Alfenus Senecio (procurator Augusti)
200 - 203 ?	**Gnaeus Haius Diadumenianus** (procurator Augustorum pro legato utrarumque Mauritaniarum Tingitanae et Caesariensis)
205 - 207	**Quintus Sallustius Macrinianus** (procurator Augustorum pro legato utrarumque Mauritaniarum Tingitanae et Caesariensis)
between 209 and 211	Gaius Octavius Pudens Caesius Honoratus (procurator Augustorum)
between 200 and 212	Gaius Julius Pacatianus (procurator Augusti pro legato)
212 - 214 ?	Quintus Munatius Celsus (praeses)
c. 216	Marcus Antonius Sabinus (procurator)
217/218	Claudius Pyrrhus (procurator)
c. 218 - after 222	Titus Aelius Decrianus (procurator Augusti)
c. 221	Julius Cestillus (procurator Augusti)
217 ? - before 231 or after 250	Marcus Aurelius Zeno Januarius (procurator Augusti praeses)
between 221 and 223 or between 230 and 232	**Gaius Julius Maximinus** ? (procurator Augusti praepositus limitis)
c. 227	Titus Licinius Hierocletes (procurator Augusti praeses provinciae)
between 222 and 235	Publius Flavius Clemens (procurator Augusti)
233 ? - 236	Publius Sallustius Sempronius Victor (procurator Augusti)
236 - 238 ?	Publius Aelius Vitalianus (procurator Augusti); Quintus Valerius (procurator Augusti)
238 ? - c. 244	Faltonius Restitutianus (praeses)
c. 244 - 249 ?	Lucius Catellius Livianus (procurator Augusti)
between 247 and 249	Marcus Aurelius Atonus Marcellus (procurator Augusti praeses)
253 - 260 ?	Marcus Cornelius Octavianus (praeses)
c. 263	Marcus Aurelius Victor (procurator praeses)

== Governors of uncertain date ==
- Publius Aelius Classicus (2nd century; procurator Augusti)
- Gaius Asprus Sabinianus (reign of Marcus Aurelius)
- Titus Flavius Serenus (reign of Alexander Severus?)
- Lucius Septimius Petronianus (end II/beginning III century)
- Tiberius Claudius Constans (between 201 and 270; procurator Augusti)

== See also ==
- Mauretania Caesariensis
