= List of Roman governors of Raetia =

This is a list of known governors of the Roman province of Raetia. The province was created in 15 BC as an imperial equestrian province by the Emperor Augustus. The whole province (including Vindelicia) was at first under a praefectus, then under a procurator. Then when Legio III Italica was raised in 165, its commander became the effective governor of Raetia, until the province was assigned a legatus pro praetore starting in 174.

== Equestrian governors of Raetia ==
- Porcius Septimus (AD 69)
- Titus Flavius Norbanus (c. 86)
- Tiberius Julius Aquilinus (107)
- Lucius Cornelius Latinianus (before 116)
- Marcus Sempronius Liberalis (139-140)
- Quintus Baienus Blassianus (150-153)
- Ulpius Victor (153)
- Lucius Titulenus (reign of Antoninus Pius?)
- Titus Varius Clemens (157)
- Sextus Baius Pudens (c. 163/164)
- Titus Desticius Severus (166)

== Senatorial governors of Raetia ==
- Larcius Lepidius (c. 175-c. 179)
- Marcus Helvius Clemens Dextrianus (c. 177-c. 180)
- Aulus Spicius Cerealis (c. 181)
- Gaius Caerellius Sabinus (c. 185)
- Appius Claudius Lateranus (before 180)
- Gaius Julius Avitus Alexianus (c. 198)
- [Meri]us Surus (between 195 and 205)
- Aulus (Olus) Terentius Pudens Uttedianus (between 198 and 209)
- Publius Porcus Optatus Flamma (c. 200)
- Gaius Octavius Appius Suetrius Sabinus (213)
- [ -- Dio]nysius (between 218 and 222)
- Marcus Simplicinius Genialis (260)
- Aurelius Mucianus (late 3rd century)

== See also ==
- Lists of ancient Roman governors
