= Raetia =

Roman province

Raetia Provincia Raetia
- Province of the Roman Empire
- 15 BC–476 AD
- Capital: Augusta Vindelicorum
- Area
  - Coordinates: 47.3600°N 8.5600°E
- Historical era: Antiquity
  - Established: 15 BC
  - Ostrogothic conquest: 476 AD
Preceded by
Raetians
Vindelicians
Succeeded by
Ostrogoths
Alemanni
Baiuvarii
Churraetia
- Today part of: Austria; Switzerland; Germany; Liechtenstein; Italy

The Roman Empire in the time of Hadrian (ruled 117–138 AD), showing, on the upper Danube river, the imperial province of Raetia (Switzerland/Tyrol/Germany south of the Danube), with no legions deployed there in 125

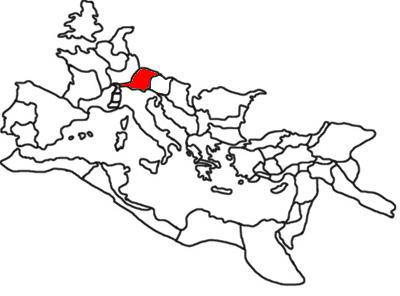
Province of Raetia highlighted

Raetia or Rhaetia (/ˈriːʃ(i)ə/ REE-sh(ee-)ə, Latin: [ˈrae̯.ti.a]) was a province of the Roman Empire named after the Rhaetian people. It bordered on the west with the country of the Helvetii, on the east with Noricum, on the north with Vindelicia, on the south-west with Transalpine Gaul and on the south with Venetia et Histria, a region of Roman Italy.

It thus comprised the districts occupied in modern times by eastern and central Switzerland (containing the Upper Rhine and Lake Constance), southern Germany (Bavaria and most of Baden-Württemberg), Vorarlberg and the greater part of Tyrol in Austria, and part of northern Lombardy in Italy. The region of Vindelicia (today eastern Württemberg and western Bavaria) was annexed to the province at a later date than the others. The northern border of Raetia during the reigns of emperors Augustus and Tiberius was the River Danube. Later the Limes Germanicus marked the northern boundary, stretching for 166 km north of the Danube. Raetia was connected to Italy across the Alps over the Reschen Pass, by the Via Claudia Augusta.

The capital of the province was Augusta Vindelicorum, present-day Augsburg in southern Germany.

== History ==
Little is known of the origin or history of the Raetians, who appear in the records as one of the most powerful and warlike of the Alpine tribes. Livy states distinctly that they were of Etruscan origin (a belief that was favored by Niebuhr and Mommsen). A tradition reported by Justin and Pliny the Elder affirmed that they were a portion of that people who had settled in the plains of the Po and were driven into the mountains by the invading Gauls, when they assumed the name of "Raetians" from an eponymous leader Raetus. Even if their Etruscan origin be accepted, at the time when the land became known to the Romans, Celtic tribes were already in possession of much of it and had amalgamated so completely with the original inhabitants that, generally speaking, the Raetians of later times may be regarded as a Celtic people, although non-Celtic tribes (es. Euganei) were settled among them.

The Raetians are first mentioned (but only incidentally) by Polybius, and little is heard of them till after the end of the Republic. There is little doubt, however, that they retained their independence until their subjugation in 15 BC by Tiberius and Drusus.

At first Raetia formed a distinct province, but towards the end of the 1st century AD Vindelicia was added to it; hence, Tacitus (Germania, 41) could speak of Augusta Vindelicorum (Augsburg) as "a colony of the province of Raetia". The whole province (including Vindelicia) was at first under a military prefect, then under a procurator; it had no standing army quartered in it but relied on its own native troops and militia for protection until the 2nd century AD.

During the reign of Marcus Aurelius, Raetia was governed by the commander of the Legio III Italica, which was based in Castra Regina (Regensburg) by 179 AD. Under Diocletian, Raetia formed part of the diocese of the vicarius Italiae, and was subdivided into Raetia prima, with a praeses at Curia Raetorum (Chur) and Raetia secunda, with a praeses at Augusta Vindelicorum (Augsburg), the former corresponding to the old Raetia, the latter to Vindelicia. The boundary between them is not clearly defined, but may be stated generally as a line drawn eastwards from the lacus Brigantinus (Lake Constance) to the Oenus (River Inn).

During the last years of the Western Roman Empire, the land was in a desolate condition, but its occupation by the Ostrogoths in the time of Theodoric the Great, who placed it under a dux, to some extent revived its prosperity. Much of Raetia prima remained as a separate political unit, Raetia Curiensis, for several centuries, until it was attached to the Duchy of Swabia in AD 917.

== Economy ==
The land was very mountainous, and the inhabitants, when not engaged in predatory expeditions, chiefly supported themselves by breeding cattle and cutting timber, little attention being paid to agriculture. Some of the valleys, however, were rich and fertile, and produced wine, which was considered equal to any in Italia. Augustus preferred Raetian wine to any other. Considerable trade in pitch, honey, wax, and cheese occurred.

== Geography ==
The chief towns of Raetia (excluding Vindelicia) were Tridentum (Trento) and Curia (Coire or Chur). It was traversed by two great lines of Roman roads: the Via Claudia Augusta leading from Verona and Tridentum across the Reschen Pass to the Fern Pass and thence to Augusta Vindelicorum (Augsburg), the other from Brigantium (Bregenz) on Lake Constance by Chur and Chiavenna to Como and Milan.

The Rätikon mountain range derives its name from Raetia.

=== Important cities ===
- Alae (Aalen)
- Arbor Felix (Arbon)
- Abodiacum (Epfach)
- Aquileia (Heidenheim an der Brenz)
- Augusta Vindelicorum (Augsburg)
- Ausugum (Borgo Valsugana)
- Bauzanum or Pons Drusi (Bolzano)
- Belunum (Belluno)
- Bilitio (Bellinzona)
- Brigantium (Bregenz)
- Cambodunum (Kempten im Allgäu)
- Castra Batava (Passau)
- Castra Regina (Regensburg)
- Clavenna (Chiavenna)
- Clunia (probably Feldkirch or Balzers)
- Curia (Chur)
- Endidae (Neumarkt)
- Feltria (Feltre)
- Foetes (Füssen)
- Guntia (Günzburg)
- Gamundia Romana (Schwäbisch Gmünd)
- Oscela (Domodossola)
- Parthanum (Partenkirchen)
- Sebatum (San Lorenzo di Sebato/St. Lorenzen)
- Sorviodurum (Straubing)
- Sublavio (Ponte Gardena/Waidbruck)
- Tridentum (Trento)
- Veldidena (Wilten district of Innsbruck)
- Vipitenum (Vipiteno/Sterzing)

== See also ==
- Alpine regiments of the Roman army
- List of Roman governors of Raetia
