= State governors in the Nigerian Third Republic =

Civilian governors in Nigeria, 1992–1993

The Nigerian Third Republic (1992–1993) was an unsuccessful attempt to restore Nigeria to democracy. It was initiated by General Ibrahim Babangida. The election in this republic was conducted by NEC- National Electoral Commission.

Babangida allowed for elections of civilian governors for each state, taking office in January 1992, followed by election which M. K. O. Abiola was assumes the winner as the civilian President in 1993. However, Abiola's election was annulled and after some confusion General Sani Abacha became head of state in November 1993, replacing the civilian governors with military administrators.
