= List of governors of colonial America =

Colonial America

Lists of governors of colonial America cover the governors of Thirteen Colonies of Britain in North America that declared independence in 1776, as well as governors of the Spanish provinces of New Spain and the French provinces of New France that later were absorbed into the United States.

== Thirteen Colonies ==
- List of colonial governors of Connecticut
- List of colonial governors of Georgia
- List of colonial governors of Maryland
- List of colonial governors of Maine
- List of colonial governors of Massachusetts
- List of colonial governors of New Hampshire
- List of colonial governors of New Jersey
- List of colonial governors of New York
- List of colonial governors of North Carolina
- List of colonial governors of Pennsylvania
- List of colonial governors of Rhode Island
- List of colonial governors of South Carolina
- List of colonial governors of Virginia

== New Spain and New France ==
- List of governors of California before 1850
- List of colonial governors of Florida
- List of colonial governors of Louisiana
- List of Spanish governors of New Mexico
- List of colonial governors of Texas

== See also ==
- Director of New Netherland
