= Nigerian state governors 2011–2015 term =

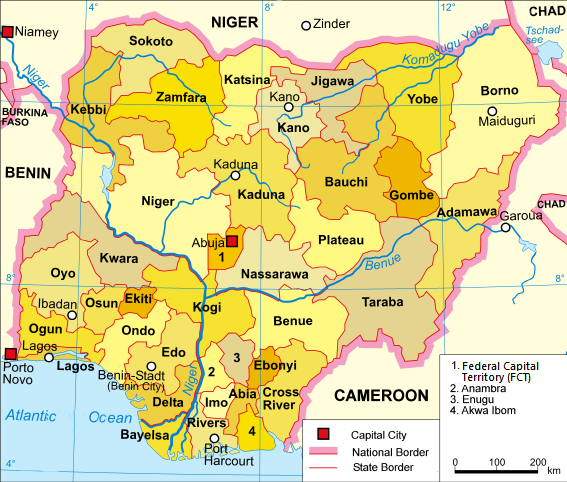
State of Nigeria

The Nigerian state governors 2011–2015 term formally begins in May 2011 for the 26 state governors in Nigeria elected in April 2011. In the 10 other states, elections were delayed until the current incumbent had served their full term. Governors are normally elected for a four-year term during the national elections in which the president and members of the upper and lower house are also elected, as are the state legislators. In some cases, the first officeholder may be replaced by another, for example through death, impeachment or if an election is annulled.

== April 2011 elections ==
Elections for 24 of the 36 states in Nigeria were held on 26 April 2011. In the northern states, elections were held in an atmosphere of violence that followed the election on 16 April 2011 of the southerner Goodluck Jonathan as President. Elections were delayed until 28 April in Bauchi and Kaduna states due to violence between Christians and Muslims. Turnout in these states was low when the elections were held.

Initial results for 12 states were announced on 28 April 2011, with seven governors being reelected and five governors elected for the first time. Later that day, results for 22 of the states had been declared, of which the People's Democratic Party (PDP) had taken 15. The Independent National Electoral Commission (INEC) declared the election in Imo State "inconclusive" due to irregularities in collation of results. On 29 April the INEC decided to hold supplementary polls in four local government areas and one ward in Imo State on 6 May 2011 to decide the election.

Elections for the 10 remaining states were to be held only when the four-year tenures of the current governors run out. The governors of Adamawa, Anambra, Bayelsa, Cross River, Edo, Ekiti, Kogi, Ondo, Osun and Sokoto states had served less than four years due to taking office only after nullification of the election of former incumbents.

== Governors ==
As of 28 May 2011, the breakdown of governors by party in 36 states was:

Party	States
ACN (Action Congress of Nigeria)	6
ANPP (All Nigeria People's Party)	3
APGA (All Progressives Grand Alliance)	2
CPC (Congress for Progressive Change)	1
LP (Labour Party)	1
PDP (People's Democratic Party)	23

Following is a list of all Nigerian state governors who held office during the 2011–2015 term. Acting governors are not shown.

State	Governor	Party	Date elected	Notes
Abia	Theodore Orji	PDP	26 April 2011	Reelected
Adamawa	Murtala Nyako	PDP	29 April 2008	Elected after April 2007 election was nullified
Akwa Ibom	Godswill Akpabio	PDP	26 April 2011	Reelected
Anambra	Peter Obi	APGA	6 February 2010	Second term
Bauchi	Isa Yuguda	PDP	28 April 2011	Reelected
Bayelsa	Seriake Dickson	PDP	24 May 2008	Reelected after nullification of April 2007 election
Benue	Gabriel Suswam	PDP	26 April 2011	Reelected
Borno	Kashim Shettima	ANPP	26 April 2011	First term
Cross River	Liyel Imoke	PDP	23 August 2008	Reelected after nullification of April 2007 election
Delta	Emmanuel Uduaghan	PDP	26 April 2011	Reelected
Ebonyi	Martin Elechi	PDP	26 April 2011	Reelected
Edo	Adams Oshiomhole	ACN	12 November 2008	Assumed office after winning appeal of April 2007 election
Ekiti	Kayode Fayemi	ACN	15 October 2010	Assumed office after winning appeal of April 2007 election
Enugu	Sullivan Chime	PDP	26 April 2011	Reelected
Gombe	Ibrahim Hassan Dankwambo	PDP	26 April 2011	First term
Imo	Rochas Okorocha	APGA	6 May 2011	First term
Jigawa	Sule Lamido	PDP	26 April 2011	Reelected
Kaduna	Yero came appointed after the death of Patrick Ibrahim Yakowa	PDP	26 April 2011	Incumbent, appointed governor on 20 May 2010 when Namadi Sambo became Vice President
Kano	Rabiu Kwankwaso	PDP	26 April 2011	Reelected
Katsina	Ibrahim Shema	PDP	28 April 2011	Reelected
Kebbi	Usman Saidu Nasamu Dakingari	PDP	26 April 2011	Reelected
Kogi	Ibrahim Idris	PDP	29 March 2008	Elected after April 2007 election declared invalid
Kwara	Abdulfatah Ahmed	PDP	26 April 2011	First term
Lagos	Babatunde Fashola	ACN	26 April 2011	Reelected
Nasarawa	Umaru Tanko Al-Makura	CPC	26 April 2011	First term
Niger	Mu'azu Babangida Aliyu	PDP	26 April 2011	Reelected
Ogun	Ibikunle Amosun	ACN	26 April 2011	Reelected
Ondo	Olusegun Mimiko	LP	24 February 2009	Assumed office after election of Olusegun Agagu was nullified
Osun	Rauf Aregbesola	ACN	26 November 2010	Assumed office after election of Olagunsoye Oyinlola was nullified
Oyo	Isiaka Abiola Ajimobi	ACN	26 April 2011	First term
Plateau	Jonah Jang	PDP	26 April 2011	Reelected
Rivers	Rotimi Amaechi	PDP	26 April 2011	Reelected
Sokoto	Aliyu Magatakarda Wamakko	PDP	28 May 2008	Reelected after April 2007 election annulled
Taraba	Danbaba Suntai	PDP	26 April 2011	Re-elected
Yobe	Ibrahim Gaidam	ANPP	26 April 2011	Reelected
Zamfara	Abdul'aziz Abubakar Yari	ANPP	26 April 2011	First term

== See also ==
- Nigerian state governors 2007–2011 term
- List of Nigerian state governors
