= List of female state governors in Mexico =

As of 2023, 14 of the 32 Mexican federal entities (31 states and the capital, Mexico City) have had a female state governor. Mexico's first female state governor was Griselda Álvarez Ponce de León, who was elected chief executive of the state of Colima for the 1979–85 period. Others have followed since:

== List ==
Name	Portrait	State	Office	Mandate start	Mandate end	Term length	Party
Griselda Álvarez		Colima	Governor	1 November 1979	1 November 1985	6 years, 0 days	PRI
Beatriz Paredes Rangel		Tlaxcala	Governor	15 January 1987	11 April 1992	5 years, 87 days	PRI
Dulce María Sauri Riancho		Yucatán	Governor	14 February 1991	1 December 1993	2 years, 290 days	PRI
Rosario Robles		Mexico City	Governor	29 September 1999	4 December 2000	1 year, 66 days	PRD
Amalia García		Zacatecas	Governor	12 September 2004	12 September 2010	6 years, 0 days	PRD
Ivonne Ortega Pacheco		Yucatán	Governor	1 August 2007	30 September 2012	5 years, 60 days	MC
Claudia Artemiza Pavlovich		Sonora	Governor	15 September 2015	15 September 2021	6 years, 0 days	PRI
Claudia Sheinbaum Pardo		Mexico City	Governor	5 December 2018	16 June 2023	4 years, 193 days	Morena
Martha Erika Alonso		Puebla	Governor	14 December 2018	24 December 2018	10 days	PAN
Lorena Cuéllar Cisneros		Tlaxcala	Governor	31 August 2021	Incumbent	5 years, 3 days	Morena
María Eugenia Campos Galván		Chihuahua	Governor	8 September 2021	Incumbent	4 years, 360 days	PAN
Layda Sansores		Campeche	Governor	15 September 2021	Incumbent	4 years, 353 days	Morena
Evelyn Salgado Pineda		Guerrero	Governor	15 October 2021	Incumbent	4 years, 323 days	Morena
Marina del Pilar Ávila Olmeda		Baja California	Governor	1 November 2021	Incumbent	4 years, 306 days	Morena
Indira Vizcaíno Silva		Colima	Governor	1 November 2021	Incumbent	4 years, 306 days	Morena
Mara Lezama Espinosa		Quintana Roo	Governor	5 September 2022	Incumbent	3 years, 363 days	Morena
María Teresa Jiménez Esquivel		Aguascalientes	Governor	1 October 2022	Incumbent	3 years, 337 days	PAN
Delfina Gómez Álvarez		State of Mexico	Governor	16 September 2023	Incumbent	2 years, 352 days	Morena
María Dolores Fritz Sierra		Yucatán	Governor	7 May 2024	30 September 2024	146 days	PAN
Libia García Muñoz Ledo		Guanajuato	Governor	26 September 2024	Incumbent	1 year, 342 days	PAN
Margarita González Saravia		Morelos	Governor	1 October 2024	Incumbent	1 year, 337 days	Morena
Clara Brugada		Mexico City	Governor	5 October 2024	Incumbent	1 year, 333 days	Morena
Rocío Nahle García		Veracruz	Governor	1 December 2024	Incumbent	1 year, 276 days	Morena
Yeraldine Bonilla Valverde		Sinaloa	Governor	2 May 2026	21 August 2026	111 days	Morena
Graciela Dominguez Nava		Sinaloa	Governor	25 August 2026	Incumbent	9 days	Morena

== See also ==
- States of Mexico
- List of Mexican state governors
