= List of governors of La Guajira Department =

Flag of the Department of La Guajira.

The following is a list of governors of the Department of La Guajira, Colombia.

== List ==
Term	Governor	Notes	ref
(1964 – ?)	José Ignacio Vives Echeverría	Founder and first governor of the Department of La Guajira	
(January 1, 1992 - January 1, 1995)	Jorge Eliecer Ballesteros Bernier		
(January 1, 1995 - January 1998)	Jorge Eduardo Perez Bernier		
(2001 - 5 July 2003)	Hernando Deluque Freyle		
(July 5 - December 31, 2003)	Jorge Eliecer Ballesteros Bernier		
(January 1, 2004 - December 31, 2007)	José Luis González Crespo		
(January 1, 2008 – December 31, 2011)	Jorge Eduardo Perez Bernier	2007 Colombian regional and municipal elections	
(January 1, 2012 – December 11, 2013)	Juan Francisco "Kiko" Gomez	arrested in 2013 for 3 murders	
(October 11, 2013 – October 29, 2013)	Roger Romero Pinto	acting	
(October 29, 2013 – February, 3 2014)	Faihan Al-Fayes Chaljub	acting	
(February 3, 2014 – July 1, 2014	Sugelia Oñate Rosado	acting	
(July 1, 2014 – December 31, 2015	José María Ballesteros Valdivieso		
(January 1, 2016 - June 8, 2016)	Oneida Rayeth Pinto Pérez		
(June 8, 2016 - November 11, 2016)	Jorge Enrique Vélez		
(February 23, 2017 – November 20, 2017)	Weildler Guerra Curvelo	appointed by Juan Manuel Santos, Wayuu	
(November 20, 2017 – September 10, 2018)	Tania Buitrago González	acting	
(September 10, 2018 – November 9, 2018)	Wilmer González Brito		
(November 9, 2018 – May 28, 2019)	Wilson Rojas Vanegas	acting	
(May 28, 2019 – July 28, 2019)	Wilbert Hernández Sierra	acting	
(July 28, 2019 – December 31, 2019)	Jhon Fuentes Medina	acting	
(January 1, 2020 – August 18, 2021)	Nemesio Raúl Roys Garzón		
(August 18, 2021 – August 24, 2021)	Jairo Aguilar Deluque	acting	
(July 25, 2022 – February 25, 2023)	José Jaime Vega Vence	acting	
(February 23, 2023 - December 31, 2023)	Diala Patricia Wilches Cortina	appointed by Gustavo Petro	
(January 1, 2024 – present)	Jairo Aguilar Deluque	2024-2027 term	

== See also ==
- List of Colombian Department Governors
