= Nigerian state governors 1999–2003 term =

The Nigerian Fourth Republic was initiated on 29 May 1999 after an orderly handover from the military regime of General Abdulsalami Abubakar, with an elected civilian governor for each state holding office for a four-year term.
