= Joaquín García Borrero =

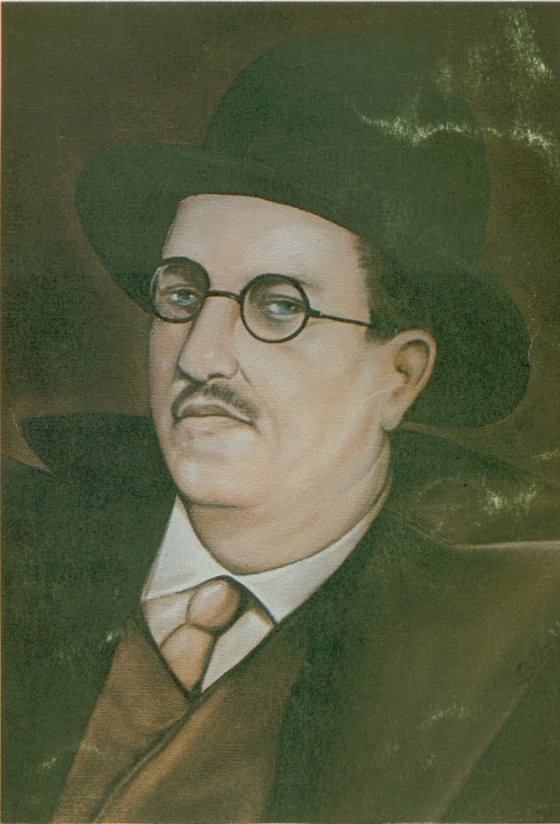

Senator of Colombia

Member of the Chamber of Representatives of Colombia
- In office 20 July 1928 – 20 July 1930
- Constituency: Huila Department

Governor of Huila Department
- In office 12 February 1932 – 22 April 1932
- President: Enrique Olaya Herrera
- Preceded by: Antonio María Paredes
- Succeeded by: Santiago Sánchez Soto

Personal details
- Born: 18 January 1894 Gigante, Tolima, Colombia
- Died: 28 February 1948 (aged 54) Neiva, Neiva, Colombia
- Party: Colombian Liberal Party
- Spouse: Susana Salas Calderón
- Children: Álvaro, Ramiro, Amparo, Consuelo, Inés, Leonor, Jimeno, Rosario
- Education: Cornell University
- Profession: Civil engineer

Joaquín García Borrero was a Colombian engineer, politician, historian and writer. He is remembered for his contributions to the progress of Huila Department. He was member of the Colombian Chamber of Representatives, Senator of Colombia and Governor of Huila Department.

García was member of the Academia Colombiana de la Lengua and the Academia Colombiana de la historia. He was the founder and first president of the Centro Departamental de Historia which originated the current Academia Huilense de Historia.

In 1998, 50 years after his death, García received the Orden de la Democracia Simón Bolívar given by the Colombian Chamber of Representatives given as a recognition to people and institutions which have worked to improve society and democracy.

== Early years ==
Joaquín García Borrero was born in Gigante, Huila in 1894. His parents were Abelardo García Salas and María Inés Borrero Alvarez. He had descended from prominent individuals such as Neiva's Governor Joaquín García Bernabeu, his grandfather, and Colombia's independence war patriot Benito Salas Vargas, his great-great-grandfather.

== Bibliography ==
=== Books ===
- El Huila y sus aspectos (Sociology)
- Neiva en el Siglo XVII (History)
- Algos (Poetry)

=== Other works ===
- La leyenda del agua (1933)
- La ciudad de los Ángeles del Nuevo Potosí
- El último Mendivil (1933)
