= Nigerian state governors 2003–2007 term =

Nigerian state governors are normally elected for a four-year term during the national elections. In some cases, the first officeholder may be replaced by another, for example through death, impeachment or if an election is annulled. Following is a list of all Nigerian state governors who held office during the 2003–2007 term. Acting governors are not shown.
