= List of governors of Huila Department =

Governor
- Coat of arms of Huila
- Incumbent; Luis Enrique Dussán López
- Term length: Four years
- Inaugural holder: Rafael Puyo Perdomo
- Formation: 1905
- Website: http://www.gobernacionhuila.gov.co/

This is a list of governors of the Huila Department from 1905.

Governor	Term began	Term ended
Rafael Puyo Perdomo	1905	1909
Ulpiano Manrique Huergo	1909	1910
Pedro Rivera Salazar	1910	1911
Roberto Caicedo Sanmiguel	1911	1912
Federico Arboleda Cuéllar	1912	1913
Livio Umaña López	1913	1914
Alejandro Villoria Rojas	1914	1916
Julio Borrero Salazar	1916	1917
Alfonso Medina Camacho	1917	1918
Federico Villoria Rojas	1918	1919
Julio Borrero Salazar	1919	1922
Celso Noé Quintero Calderón	1922	1922
José de Jesús López Arias	1922	1923
Roberto Caicedo Sanmiguel	1923	1925
Arturo Borrero	1925	1925
Gratiniano Camacho Medina	1925	1926
Floresmiro Azuero Santos	1926	1926
Alejandro Villoria Rojas	1926	1928
Rafael Leiva Charry	1927(Provisional)	1928
Floresmiro Azuero Santos	1928	1929
Abel Ramírez Hernández	1929	1929
Max Duque Gómez	1929	1930
Antonio María Paredes	1930	1932
Joaquín García Borrero	1932 (Provisional)	1932
Santiago Sánchez Soto	1932	1933
Anibal Cardoso Gaitán	1933	1934
Manuel Uribe Afanador	1934 (Provisional)	1934
Benigno Velasco Cabrera	1934	1935
Ricardo Dussán Bahamón	1935	1937
Carlos Martínez Borrero	1937 (Provisional)	1938
Ramón Salas Trujillo	1938	1938
Omar Santacoloma	1938	1939
Alberto Losada Lara	1938(Provisional)	1939
Anibal Cardoso Gaitán	1939	1940
José Domingo Liévano	1940	1941
Arturo Carrera Trujillo	1941	1942
Carlos Martínez Borrero	1942	1943
Eugenio Ferro Falla	1943	1944
Félix Trujillo Falla	1944	1945
Ignacio Villaveces López	1945	1945
Eduardo Cabrera Lozano	1945	1946
Ernesto Blanco Cabrera	1946	1946
Ernesto Esguerra Solano	1946	1947
Liborio Cuéllar Durán	1947	1948
Alberto Serrano Perdomo	1948 (provisional)	1948
Eduardo Ucrós García	1948	1949
Rafael Azuero Manchola	1949	1949
Florentino Ramírez Coronado	1949	1950
Gustavo Salazar Tapiero	1950	1953
Camilo Perdomo Cabrera	1953	1953
Angel María Vanegas Rojas	1953	1953
Ezequiel Palacios	1953	1954
Gilberto Montoya Gaviria	1954	1957
José Domingo Liévano	1960	1961
Augusto Paredes Tamayo	1961(Provisional	1961
Julio Bahamón Puyo	1960	1961
Rómulo González Trujillo	1963	1964
Jaime Afanador Tobar	1964	1966
Max Francisco Duque Palma	1966	1968
Víctor Alcides Ramírez Perdomo	1968	1969
Augusto Paredes Tamayo	1969	1970
Carlos Ortiz Fernández	1970	1971
Héctor Polanía Sánchez	1971	1974
Olga Duque de Ospina	1974	1975
David Rojas Castro	1975	1976
Jaime Ucrós García	1976	1977
Carlos Vargas Villalba	1977	1978
Hernán Hurtado Vallejo	1978(Provisional)	1978
Leonte Muñoz Calderón	1978	1978
Hernando Suárez Cleves	1978	1979
Guillermo Lozano Lara	1979	1980
Álvaro Sánchez Silva	1980	1981
Jorge Eugenio Ferro Triana	1981(provisional)	1981
Jaime Salazar Díaz	1981	1982
Antonio José Villegas Trujillo	1982	1985
José Vicente Ortiz Salas	1984(provisional)	1985
Héctor Afanador Cabrera	1985	1986
Rodrigo Manrique Medina	1986	1987
Diego Omar Muñoz Piedrahíta	1987	1988
Félix Trujillo Trujillo	1988	1990
Jorge Eduardo Gechem Turbay	1990	1991
Jairo Trujillo Delgado	1991(provisional)	1991
Jaime Francisco Afanador Iriarte	1991(provisional)	1991
Cecilia Lara de García	1991	1992
Julio Enrique Ortiz Cuenca	1992	1994
Jaime Lozada Perdomo	1995	1997
Jaime Bravo Motta	1998	2000
Juan de Jesús Cárdenas Chávez	2001	2003
Luis Jorge Sánchez García	2008	Unknown
Luis Enrique Dussán López	2020	Incumbent
